= Fascism =

Far-right authoritarian political ideology

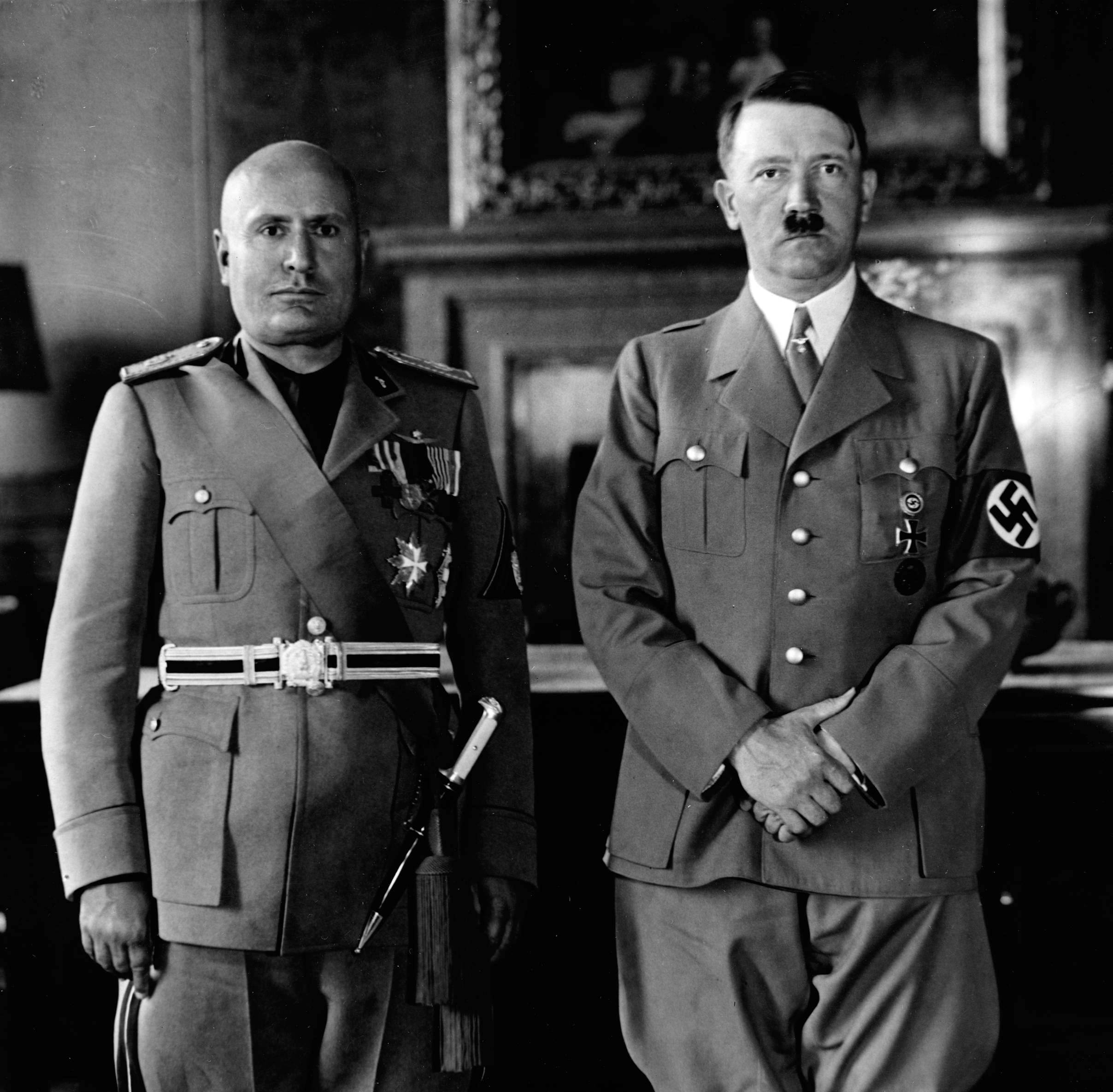
Italy's Duce, Benito Mussolini (left), and Germany's Führer, Adolf Hitler (right), were notable fascist dictators.

Fascism (/ˈfæʃɪzəm/ FASH-iz-əm) is a far-right, authoritarian, and ultranationalist political ideology and movement that rose to prominence in early-20th-century Europe. Fascism is characterized by support for a dictatorial leader, centralized autocracy, militarism, forcible suppression of opposition, belief in a natural social hierarchy, subordination of individual interests for the perceived interest of the nation or race, and strong regimentation of society and the economy. Opposed to communism, democracy, liberalism, pluralism, and socialism, fascism is at the far-right end of the traditional left–right spectrum. What constitutes a precise definition of fascism has been a longrunning and complex debate among scholars and politicians.

The first fascist movements emerged in Italy during World War I before spreading to other European countries, most notably Germany. Fascism also had adherents outside of Europe. Fascists saw World War I as a revolution that brought massive changes to the nature of war, society, the state, and technology. The advent of total war and the mass mobilization of society erased the distinction between civilians and combatants. A military citizenship arose, in which all citizens were involved with the military in some manner. The war resulted in the rise of a powerful state capable of mobilizing millions of people to serve on the front lines, providing logistics to support them, and having unprecedented authority to intervene in the lives of citizens.

Fascism views forms of violence—including political violence, imperialist violence, and war—as means to national rejuvenation. Fascists often advocate for the establishment of a totalitarian one-party state, and for a dirigiste economy, which is a market economy in which the state plays a strong directive role through market intervention with the principal goal of achieving national economic self-sufficiency, or "autarky". Fascism emphasizes both palingenesis—national rebirth or regeneration—and modernity when it is deemed compatible with national rebirth. In promoting the nation's regeneration, fascists seek to purge it of perceived "decadence". Fascism may also centre around an ingroup-outgroup opposition and demonization of "Others", such as various ethnicities, immigrants, nations, races, political opponents of fascist parties, religious groups, and sexual and gender minorities. In the case of Nazism, this involved racial purity and a belief in a master race. Such demonization has motivated fascist regimes to commit massacres, forced sterilizations, deportations, and genocides. During World War II, the genocidal and imperialist ambitions of the fascist regimes of the Axis powers resulted in the murder of millions of people.

Since the end of World War II in 1945, fascism has been largely disgraced, and few parties have openly described themselves as fascist; the term is often used pejoratively by political opponents. The descriptions neo-fascist or post-fascist are sometimes applied to contemporary parties with ideologies similar to, or rooted in, 20th-century fascist movements.

== Etymology ==
The fasces, a symbol of Ancient Rome, was employed in the modern era by various political movements to denote strength through unity.

The Italian term fascismo is derived from fascio, meaning 'bundle of sticks', ultimately from the Latin word fasces. This was the name given to political organizations in Italy known as fasci, groups similar to guilds or syndicates. According to Italian fascist dictator Benito Mussolini's own account, the Fasces of Revolutionary Action were founded in Italy in 1915. In 1919, Mussolini founded the Italian Fasces of Combat in Milan, which became the National Fascist Party two years later. The fascists came to associate the term with the ancient Roman fasces or fascio littorio, a bundle of rods tied around an axe, an ancient Roman symbol of the authority of the civic magistrate, carried by his lictors. The symbolism of the fasces suggested strength through unity: a single rod is easily broken, while the bundle is difficult to break.

Prior to 1914, the fasces symbol was widely employed by various political movements, often of a left-wing, liberal, or republican persuasion. For instance, according to Robert Paxton, "Marianne, symbol of the French Republic, was often portrayed in the nineteenth century carrying the fasces to represent the force of Republican solidarity against her aristocratic and clerical enemies." The symbol often appeared as an architectural motif, for instance on the Sheldonian Theater at Oxford University and on the Lincoln Memorial in Washington, D.C.

== Definitions ==
Historian Ian Kershaw once wrote, "Trying to define 'fascism' is like trying to nail jelly to the wall." Each group described as "fascist" has at least some unique elements, and frequently, definitions of "fascism" have been criticized as either too broad or too narrow. According to many scholars, fascists—especially when they are in power—have historically attacked communism, socialism, and parliamentary liberalism, attracting support primarily from the far-right.

One of the schools of fascism studies understands fascism as a movement based on the myth of national rebirth, called palingenesis. Prominent members of the school include Stanley G. Payne, Roger Griffin, and Roger Eatwell, who defined their theories as the "new consensus". Payne's definition of fascism focuses on three concepts:

1. "Fascist negations" – anti-liberalism, anti-communism, and anti-conservatism.
2. "Fascist goals" – the creation of a nationalist dictatorship to regulate economic structure and to transform social relations within a modern, self-determined culture, and the expansion of the nation into an empire.
3. "Fascist style" – a political aesthetic of romantic symbolism, mass mobilization, a positive view of violence, and promotion of masculinity, youth, and charismatic authoritarian leadership.

Eatwell defines fascism as "an ideology that strives to forge social rebirth based on a holistic-national radical Third Way". Roger Griffin follows the description of Payne, calling fascism "a genuinely revolutionary, trans-class form of anti-liberal, and in the last analysis, anti-conservative nationalism", and adds an emphasis on the "mythic core" of fascism which he defines as a "palingenetic form of populist ultranationalism". According to Griffin, fascism as an ideology includes: "(i) the rebirth myth, (ii) populist ultra-nationalism, and (iii) the myth of decadence". Thus, palingenetic ultranationalism constitutes the minimum, without which a "genuine fascism" is not possible according to Griffin, and fascism draws on ancient and arcane myths of racial, cultural, ethnic, and national origins to develop the fascist "new man"; and acts as a "political religion" seeking to establish a community based on a new culture. Griffin explored this 'mythic' or 'eliminable' core of fascism with his concept of post-fascism to explore the continuation of Nazism in the modern era. Additionally, other historians have applied this minimalist core to explore proto-fascist movements.

While the theories of "new consensus" authors have proven to be very influential, they have also failed to establish a historiographic consensus. These theories have received criticism from other scholars, often for presenting a static and context-isolated "ideal type" (or set of ideas) disregarding the dynamic, contradictory and syncretic nature of fascism and its context. In particular, the critics pointed out the failure to address the contradiction between anti-conservatism and anti-communism, since fascism preserved the latter while achieving power through alliance conservatism, or that the majority of fascists sought to synthesize fascism with traditional religions and cultures instead of replacing them. Griffin's 'minimal' criterion of national rebirth also received criticism as too broad, applicable to non-fascist movements, or arbitrary, not applicable to certain regimes which may be considered fascist, and also as a rework of the 'totalitarian' model of understanding fascism.

Walter Laqueur sees the core tenets of fascism as "self-evident: nationalism; social Darwinism; racialism, the need for leadership, a new aristocracy, and obedience; and the negation of the ideals of the Enlightenment and the French Revolution".

Kershaw argues that the difference between fascism and other forms of right-wing authoritarianism in the interwar period is that the latter generally aimed "to conserve the existing social order", whereas fascism was "revolutionary", seeking to change society and obtain "total commitment" from the population.

In his book How Fascism Works: The Politics of Us and Them (2018), Jason Stanley defined fascism thusly:

[A] cult of the leader who promises national restoration in the face of humiliation brought on by supposed communists, Marxists and minorities and immigrants who are supposedly posing a threat to the character and the history of a nation ... The leader proposes that only he can solve it and all of his political opponents are enemies or traitors.

Cas Mudde and Cristóbal Rovira Kaltwasser argue that although fascism "flirted with populism ... in an attempt to generate mass support", it is better seen as an elitist ideology. They cite in particular its exaltation of the Leader, the race, and the state, rather than the people. They see populism as a "thin-centered ideology" with a "restricted morphology" that necessarily becomes attached to "thick-centered" ideologies such as fascism, liberalism, or socialism. Thus populism can be found as an aspect of many specific ideologies, without necessarily being a defining characteristic of those ideologies. They refer to the combination of populism, authoritarianism and ultranationalism as "a marriage of convenience".

Robert Paxton says:

[Fascism is] a form of political behavior marked by obsessive preoccupation with community decline, humiliation, or victimhood and by compensatory cults of unity, energy, and purity, in which a mass-based party of committed nationalist militants, working in uneasy but effective collaboration with traditional elites, abandons democratic liberties and pursues with redemptive violence and without ethical or legal restraints goals of internal cleansing and external expansion.

Umberto Eco lists fourteen "features that are typical of what [he] would like to call 'Ur-Fascism', or 'Eternal Fascism'. These features cannot be organized into a system; many of them contradict each other, and are also typical of other kinds of despotism or fanaticism. But it is enough that one of them be present to allow fascism to coagulate around it." Historian John Lukacs argues that there is no such thing as generic fascism. He claims that Nazism and communism are essentially manifestations of populism, and that states such as Nazi Germany and Fascist Italy are more different from each other than they are similar.

Historian Emilio Gentile has defined fascism thusly:

[A] modern political phenomenon, revolutionary, anti-liberal, and anti-Marxist, organized in a militia party with a totalitarian conception of politics and the state, an activist and anti-theoretical ideology, with a mythical, virilistic and anti-hedonistic foundation, sacralized as a secular religion, which affirms the absolute primacy of the nation, understood as an ethnically homogeneous organic community, hierarchically organized in a corporate state, with a bellicose vocation to the politics of greatness, power, and conquest aimed at creating a new order and a new civilization.

Historian and cultural critic Ruth Ben-Ghiat has described fascism as "the original phase of authoritarianism, along with early communism, when a population has undergone huge dislocations or they perceive that there's been changes in society that are very rapid, too rapid for their taste".

Racism was a key feature of German fascism, for which the Holocaust was a high priority. According to The Historiography of Genocide, "In dealing with the Holocaust, it is the consensus of historians that Nazi Germany targeted Jews as a race, not as a religious group." Several historians, such as Umberto Eco, Kevin Passmore, and Moyra Grant, stress racism as a characteristic component of German fascism. Historian Robert Soucy stated, "Hitler envisioned the ideal German society as a Volksgemeinschaft, a racially unified and hierarchically organized body in which the interests of individuals would be strictly subordinate to those of the nation, or Volk." Kershaw noted that common factors of fascism included "the 'cleansing' of all those deemed not to belong—foreigners, ethnic minorities, 'undesirables'"—and belief in its own nation's superiority, even if it was not biological racism like in Nazism. Fascist philosophies vary by application, but remain distinct by one theoretical commonality: all traditionally fall into the far-right sector of any political spectrum, catalyzed by afflicted class identities over conventional social inequities.

=== Position on the political spectrum ===
Scholars place fascism on the far right of the political spectrum. Such scholarship focuses on its social conservatism and its authoritarian means of opposing egalitarianism. Roderick Stackelberg places fascism—including Nazism, which he says is "a radical variant of fascism"—on the political right by explaining: "The more a person deems absolute equality among all people to be a desirable condition, the further left he or she will be on the ideological spectrum. The more a person considers inequality to be unavoidable or even desirable, the further to the right he or she will be."

Fascism's origins are complex and include many seemingly contradictory viewpoints, ultimately centered on a mythos of national rebirth from decadence. Fascism was founded during World War I by Italian national syndicalists who drew upon both left-wing organizational tactics and right-wing political views. Italian fascism gravitated to the right in the early 1920s. A major element of fascist ideology that has been deemed to be far right is its stated goal to promote the right of a supposedly superior people to dominate, while purging society of supposedly inferior elements.

Mussolini and Giovanni Gentile described their ideology as right-wing in the political essay The Doctrine of Fascism (1932), stating: "We are free to believe that this is the century of authority, a century tending to the 'right,' a fascist century." Mussolini stated that fascism's position on the political spectrum was not a serious issue for fascists: "[F]ascism, sitting on the right, could also have sat on the mountain of the center. ... These words in any case do not have a fixed and unchanged meaning: they do have a variable subject to location, time and spirit. We don't give a damn about these empty terminologies and we despise those who are terrorized by these words."

Major Italian groups politically on the right, especially rich landowners and big business, feared an uprising by groups on the left, such as sharecroppers and labour unions. They welcomed fascism and supported its violent suppression of opponents on the left. The accommodation of the political right into the Italian Fascist movement in the early 1920s created internal factions within the movement. The "fascist left" included Michele Bianchi, Giuseppe Bottai, Angelo Oliviero Olivetti, Sergio Panunzio, and Edmondo Rossoni, who were committed to advancing national syndicalism as a replacement for parliamentary liberalism in order to modernize the economy and advance the interests of workers and the common people. The "fascist right" included members of the paramilitary Blackshirts and former members of the Italian Nationalist Association (ANI). The Blackshirts wanted to establish fascism as a complete dictatorship, while the former ANI members, including Alfredo Rocco, sought to institute an authoritarian corporatist state to replace the liberal state in Italy while retaining the existing elites. Upon accommodating the political right, there arose a group of monarchist fascists who sought to use fascism to create an absolute monarchy under King Victor Emmanuel III of Italy.

A number of post-World War II fascist movements described themselves as a "third position", outside the traditional political spectrum. Falange Española de las JONS leader José Antonio Primo de Rivera said: "[B]asically the Right stands for the maintenance of an economic structure, albeit an unjust one, while the Left stands for the attempt to subvert that economic structure, even though the subversion thereof would entail the destruction of much that was worthwhile."

=== Fascist as a pejorative ===
The term fascist has been used as a pejorative, regarding varying movements across the far right of the political spectrum. The anti-fascist and socialist George Orwell suggested in 1944 that the term had been used to denigrate diverse positions "in internal politics". Orwell said that while fascism is "a political and economic system" that was inconvenient to define, "as used, the word 'Fascism' is almost entirely meaningless. ... almost any English person would accept 'bully' as a synonym for 'Fascist'". University of Wales historian Richard Griffiths wrote in 2000 that "fascism" is the "most misused, and over-used word, of our times". Fascist is sometimes applied to post-World War II organizations and ways of thinking that academics more commonly term neo-fascist.

Despite fascist movements' history of anti-communism, Communist states have sometimes been referred to as fascist, typically as an insult. It has been applied to Marxist–Leninist regimes in Cuba under Fidel Castro and Vietnam under Ho Chi Minh. Chinese Marxists used the term to denounce the Soviet Union during the Sino-Soviet split, and the Soviets used the term to denounce Chinese Marxists, in addition to social democracy, coining a new term in social fascism. In the United States, Herbert Matthews of The New York Times asked in 1946: "Should we now place Stalinist Russia in the same category as Hitlerite Germany? Should we say that she is Fascist?" J. Edgar Hoover, longtime FBI director and ardent anti-communist, wrote extensively of red fascism. The Ku Klux Klan of the 1920s has sometimes been called fascist. Historian Peter Amann states that, "Undeniably, the Klan had some traits in common with European fascism—chauvinism, racism, a mystique of violence, an affirmation of a certain kind of archaic traditionalism—yet their differences were fundamental ... [the KKK] never envisioned a change of political or economic system."

== History ==
=== Fin de siècle era and lead up to World War I (1880–1914) ===
The historian Zeev Sternhell has traced the ideological roots of fascism back to the 1880s and in particular to the fin de siècle theme of that time. The theme was based on a revolt against materialism, rationalism, positivism, bourgeois society, and democracy. The fin-de-siècle generation supported emotionalism, irrationalism, subjectivism, and vitalism. They regarded civilization as being in crisis, and as requiring a massive and total solution. Their intellectual school considered the individual as only one part of the larger collectivity, which should not be viewed as a numerical sum of atomized individuals. They condemned the rationalistic, liberal individualism of society and the dissolution of social links in bourgeois society.

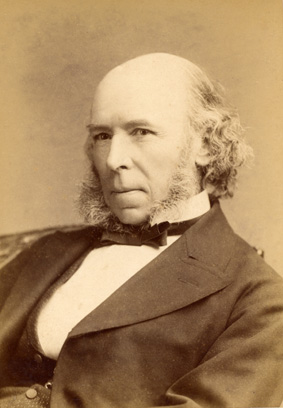
Herbert Spencer, the social Darwinist who coined the phrase "survival of the fittest".

The fin-de-siècle outlook was influenced by various intellectual developments, including Darwinian biology, Gesamtkunstwerk, Arthur de Gobineau's racialism, Gustave Le Bon's psychology, and the philosophies of Friedrich Nietzsche, Fyodor Dostoyevsky, and Henri Bergson. Social Darwinism, which gained widespread acceptance, made no distinction between physical and social life, and viewed the human condition as an unceasing struggle to achieve the survival of the fittest. It challenged positivism's claim of deliberate and rational choice as the determining behaviour of humans, with social Darwinism focusing on heredity, race, and environment. Its emphasis on biogroup identity and the role of organic relations within societies fostered the legitimacy and appeal of nationalism. New theories of social and political psychology rejected the notion of human behaviour being governed by rational choice and instead claimed that emotion was more influential in political issues than reason. Nietzsche's concept of the Übermensch and his advocacy of the will to power as a primordial instinct, were major influences upon many of the fin-de-siècle generation. Bergson's claim of the existence of an élan vital, or vital instinct, centred upon free choice and rejected the processes of materialism and determinism; this challenged Marxism.

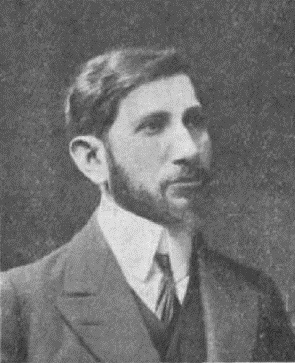
Charles Maurras

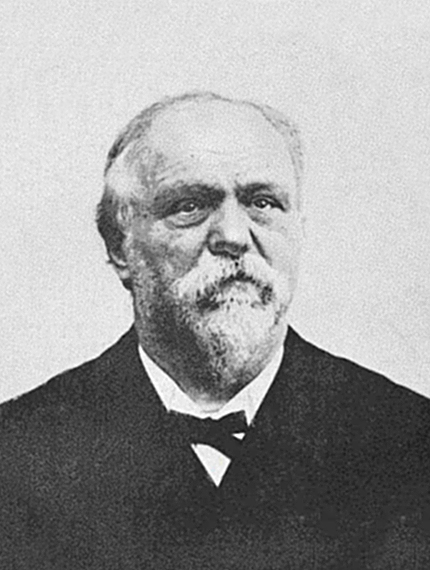
Georges Sorel

French nationalist and reactionary monarchist Charles Maurras influenced fascism. Maurras promoted what he called integral nationalism, which called for the organic unity of a nation, and insisted that a powerful monarch was an ideal leader of a nation. Maurras claimed that a powerful monarch was a personified sovereign who could exercise authority to unite a nation's people. Fascists idealized Maurras' integral nationalism, but modified into a modernized revolutionary form - devoid of Maurras' monarchism.

French revolutionary syndicalist Georges Sorel (1847-1922) promoted the legitimacy of political violence in his work Reflections on Violence (1908) and in other works in which he advocated radical syndicalist action to achieve a revolution to overthrow capitalism and the bourgeoisie through a general strike. In Reflections on Violence, Sorel emphasized need for a revolutionary political religion. By 1909, after the failure of a syndicalist general strike in France, Sorel and his supporters abandoned the radical left and went to the radical right, where they sought to merge militant Catholicism and French patriotism with their views—advocating anti-republican Christian French patriots as ideal revolutionaries. Sorel began to support reactionary Maurrassian nationalism beginning in 1909, and this influenced his works. Maurras held interest in merging his nationalist ideals with Sorelian syndicalism as a means to confront democracy.

The fusion of Maurrassian nationalism and Sorelian syndicalism influenced radical Italian nationalist Enrico Corradini (1865-1931). Corradini spoke of the need for a nationalist-syndicalist movement, led by elitist aristocrats and anti-democrats who shared a revolutionary syndicalist commitment to direct action and a willingness to fight. Corradini spoke of Italy as being a "proletarian nation" that needed to pursue imperialism in order to challenge the "plutocratic" French and British. Corradini's views were part of a wider set of perceptions within the right-wing Italian Nationalist Association (ANI, founded in 1910), which claimed that Italy's economic backwardness was caused by corruption in its political class, liberalism, and division caused by "ignoble socialism".

The ANI had ties and influence among conservatives, Catholics, and the business community. Italian national syndicalists held a common set of principles: the rejection of bourgeois values, democracy, liberalism, Marxism, internationalism, and pacifism, and the promotion of heroism, vitalism, and violence. The ANI claimed that liberal democracy was no longer compatible with the modern world, and advocated a strong state and imperialism. They believed that humans are naturally predatory, and that nations are in a constant struggle in which only the strongest would survive.

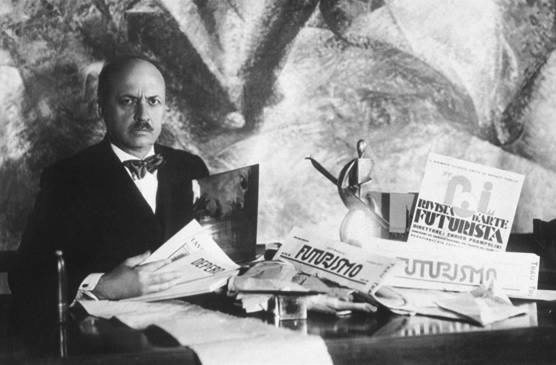
Filippo Tommaso Marinetti, Italian modernist author of the Futurist Manifesto (1909) and later the co-author of the Fascist Manifesto (1919)

Futurism was both an artistic-cultural movement and initially a political movement in Italy led by Filippo Tommaso Marinetti (1876-1944) who wrote the Manifesto of Futurism (1908), that championed the causes of modernism, action, and political violence as necessary elements of politics while denouncing liberalism and parliamentary politics. Futurism influenced fascism in its emphasis on recognizing the virile nature of violent action and war as necessities of modern civilization.

=== World War I and its aftermath (1914–1929) ===
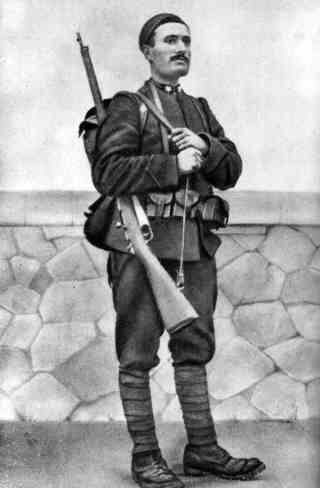
Benito Mussolini in 1917 as an Italian soldier in World War I

At the outbreak of World War I in August 1914, the Italian political left became severely split over its position on the war. The Italian Socialist Party (PSI) opposed the war but a number of Italian revolutionary syndicalists supported war against Germany and Austria-Hungary on the grounds that their reactionary regimes had to be defeated to ensure the success of socialism. Angelo Oliviero Olivetti formed a pro-interventionist fascio called the Revolutionary Fasces of International Action in October 1914. Benito Mussolini upon being expelled from his position as chief editor of the PSI's newspaper Avanti! for his anti-German stance, joined the interventionist cause in a separate fascio. The term "fascism" was first used in 1915 by members of Mussolini's movement, the Fasces of Revolutionary Action.

The first meeting of the Fasces of Revolutionary Action was held on 24 January 1915 when Mussolini declared that it was necessary for Europe to resolve its national problems—including national borders—of Italy and elsewhere "for the ideals of justice and liberty for which oppressed peoples must acquire the right to belong to those national communities from which they descended". Attempts to hold mass meetings were ineffective and the organization was regularly harassed by government authorities and socialists.

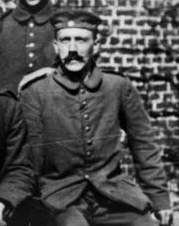
Adolf Hitler as a German soldier in World War I

Similar political ideas arose in Germany after the outbreak of the war. German sociologist Johann Plenge spoke of the rise of a "National Socialism" in Germany within what he termed the "ideas of 1914" that were a declaration of war against the "ideas of 1789" (the French Revolution). According to Plenge, the "ideas of 1789"—such as the rights of man, democracy, individualism and liberalism—were being rejected in favor of "the ideas of 1914" that included "German values" of duty, discipline, law and order. Plenge believed that racial solidarity (Volksgemeinschaft) would replace class division and that "racial comrades" would unite to create a socialist society in the struggle of "proletarian" Germany against "capitalist" Britain.

==== Impact of World War I ====
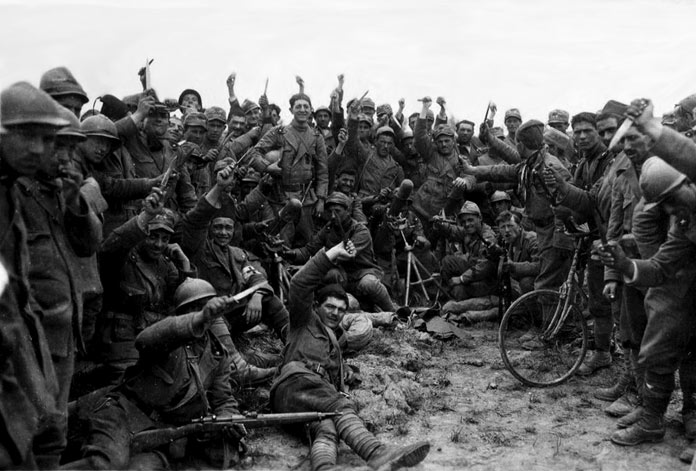
Members of Italy's Arditi corps, shown here in 1918 holding daggers, a symbol of their group. They were formed in 1917 as groups of soldiers trained for dangerous missions, characterized by a refusal to surrender and a willingness to fight to the death. They inspired the Italian Fascist movement.

Fascists viewed World War I as bringing revolutionary changes in the nature of war, society, the state and technology, as the advent of total war and mass mobilization had broken down the distinction between civilian and combatant, as civilians had become a critical part in economic production for the war effort and thus arose a "military citizenship" in which all citizens were involved to the military in some manner during the war. World War I had resulted in the rise of a powerful state capable of mobilizing millions of people to serve on the front lines or provide economic production and logistics to support those on the front lines, as well as having unprecedented authority to intervene in the lives of citizens. Fascists viewed technological developments of weaponry and the state's total mobilization of its population in the war as symbolizing the beginning of a new era fusing state power with mass politics, technology and particularly the mobilizing myth that they contended had triumphed over the myth of progress and the era of liberalism.

==== Impact of Revolutions of 1917–1923 ====
The October Revolution of 1917, in which Bolshevik communists led by Vladimir Lenin seized power in Russia and later established the Soviet Union, greatly influenced the development of fascism. In 1917, Mussolini, as leader of the Fasces of Revolutionary Action, praised the October Revolution, but later he became unimpressed with Lenin, regarding him as merely a new version of Tsar Nicholas II. The fascists presented themselves as anti-communists and as especially opposed to the Marxists; after World War I, fascists commonly campaigned on anti-Marxist agendas and used the fear of a communist revolution. In 1919, Mussolini consolidated control over the fascist movement, known as Sansepolcrismo, with the founding of the Italian Fasces of Combat.

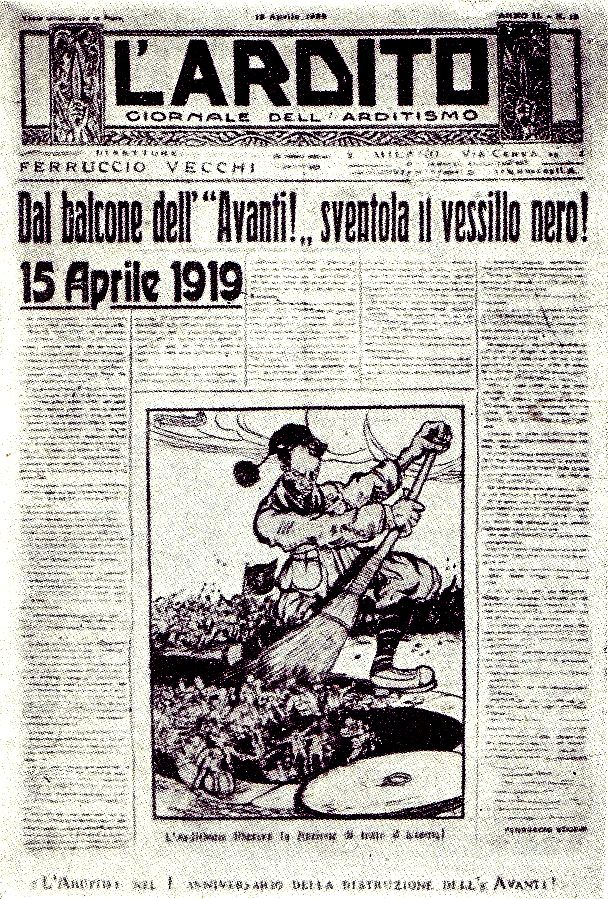
The newspaper L'Ardito celebrating an anniversary of the first attack of squadristi, the fascist militias, on the socialist newspaper Avanti! – during the Biennio Rosso (1919–1920) and Revolutions of 1917–1923

Paxton writes that fascists profited from the failure of Lenin's plan to launch the world socialist revolution, which attempted to take form during the broader period of Revolutions of 1917–1923. The socialist project competed with the liberal and conservative ones. Liberal ideas regarding rebuilding Europe and the world were summarized in Woodrow Wilson's Fourteen Points, proposing a harmony of equal nations; the conservatives sought to make military force the base for the new order ruled by great powers. None of them were realized completely: the revolution was not suppressed only in the former Russian Empire (Russian Civil War) while being defeated in Germany (Revolution of 1918–1919) and Hungary (Revolution of 1918–1920), but the class struggle continued in Europe; the realization of Wilson's plan took a direction closer to conservatism and resulted in the hierarchy of small nations and the victorious Allied states; the Allied conservatism tried to suppress the formal Central Powers but led to revanchism. The failure of the three opened a window for a new project offered by fascists, drawing on their frustrations: they promised to overcome class struggle with authoritarian nationalism and purging the "alien" and the "impure", a world of great powers, but with greatness determined "not only by military might, but by the fervour and unity of their populations", and rejected peace in favour of the decisive victory over the weaker ones. Other than that, since the socialist struggle continued and threatened to follow the success of the Russian Revolution, primarily middle and upper classes sought a decisive answer to it which at the same time would deal with the crisis of liberal institutions – such as parliament, market and school. In Italy, this crisis reached its highest during the Biennio Rosso of 1919–1920, the peak of the socialist activities including massive land seizures and strikes and socialists becoming elected as mayors and parliament members, which led to the rise of fear of a revolution among the middle and conservative classes.

Andreas Umland argues that despite the hostility and opposite attitudes to private property, there are similarities between fascism and Bolshevism, the variant of Marxist communism of Lenin and his followers, including that both were elitist and, according to him, revolutionary movements which shared similar leadership principles, showed contempt for bourgeois values, and had totalitarian ambitions. He says that in practice both have commonly emphasized revolutionary action, proletarian nation theories, and party-armies; both established one-party dictatorships as achieving power. Nevertheless, as he writes, anti-communism of fascists was one of their expressions of their anti-universalism, along with such right-wing denominators as nationalism and sexism. Later the Nazis would exploit the notion of "Bolshevism", linking it to their antisemitic conspiracy theories. Meanwhile, after the Stalinist transformation of Bolshevism, the latter would, according to Umland, resemble fascism more, as it abrogated universalism and celebrated nationalism.

==== Fascist Manifesto and Charter of Carnaro ====
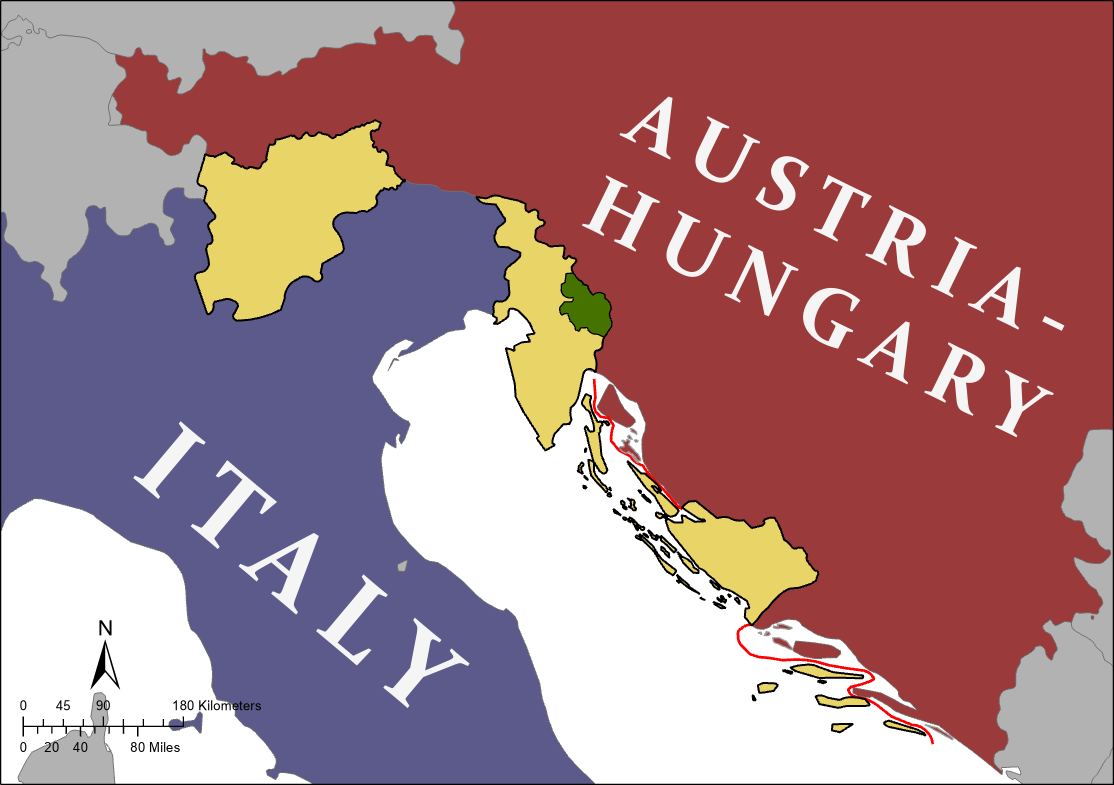
Territories promised to Italy by the Treaty of London (1915): Trentino-Alto Adige, the Julian March and Dalmatia (tan) and the Snežnik Plateau area (green). However, after World War I, while Italy annexed the capital city Zara of Dalmatia the rest of Dalmatia was not assigned to Italy but to Yugoslavia.

In 1919, Alceste De Ambris and futurist movement leader Filippo Tommaso Marinetti created "The Manifesto of the Italian Fasces of Combat". The Fascist Manifesto was presented on 6 June 1919 in the fascist newspaper Il Popolo d'Italia and supported the creation of universal suffrage, including women's suffrage (the latter being realized only partly in late 1925, with all opposition parties banned or disbanded); proportional representation on a regional basis; government representation through a corporatist system of "National Councils" of experts, selected from professionals and tradespeople, elected to represent and hold legislative power over their respective areas, including labour, industry, transportation, public health, and communications, among others; and abolition of the Senate of the Kingdom of Italy. The Fascist Manifesto supported the creation of an eight-hour work day for all workers, a minimum wage, worker representation in industrial management, equal confidence in labour unions as in industrial executives and public servants, reorganization of the transportation sector, revision of the draft law on invalidity insurance, reduction of the retirement age from 65 to 55, a strong progressive tax on capital, confiscation of the property of religious institutions and abolishment of bishoprics, and revision of military contracts to allow the government to seize 85% of profits. It also called for the fulfillment of expansionist aims in the Balkans and other parts of the Mediterranean, the creation of a short-service national militia to serve defensive duties, nationalization of the armaments industry, and a foreign policy designed to be peaceful but also competitive.

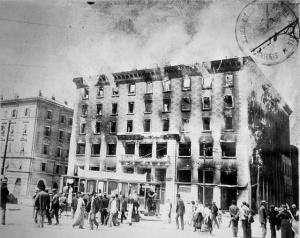
The Slovene Narodni dom ("National Home") in Trieste on fire after being burned by Fascists on 13 July 1920.

The next events that influenced the fascists in Italy were the raid of Fiume by Italian nationalist Gabriele d'Annunzio and the founding of the Charter of Carnaro in 1920. D'Annunzio and De Ambris designed the Charter, which advocated national-syndicalist corporatist productionism alongside D'Annunzio's political views. Many fascists saw the Charter of Carnaro as an ideal constitution for a fascist Italy. This behaviour of aggression towards Yugoslavia and South Slavs was pursued by Italian fascists with their persecution of South Slavs—especially Slovenes and Croats. Italy claimed Fiume on the principle of self-determination, disregarding the 50.4% of its population that were Yugoslavs.

==== Accommodating conservatives ====
In 1920, militant strike activity by industrial workers reached its peak in Italy and 1919 and 1920 were known as the "Red Year" (Biennio Rosso). Mussolini and the fascists took advantage of the situation by allying with industrial businesses and attacking workers and peasants in the name of preserving order and internal peace in Italy.

Fascists identified their primary opponents as the majority of socialists on the left who had opposed intervention in World War I. The fascists and the Italian political right held common ground: both held Marxism in contempt, discounted class consciousness and believed in the rule of elites. The fascists assisted the anti-socialist campaign by allying with the other parties and the conservative right in a mutual effort to destroy the Italian Socialist Party and labour organizations committed to class identity above national identity.

Fascism sought to accommodate Italian conservatives by making major alterations to its political agenda—abandoning its previous populism, republicanism and anticlericalism, adopting policies in support of free enterprise and accepting the Catholic Church and the monarchy as institutions in Italy. To appeal to Italian conservatives, fascism adopted policies such as promoting family values, including policies designed to reduce the number of women in the workforce—limiting the woman's role to that of a mother. The fascists banned literature on birth control and increased penalties for abortion in 1926, declaring both crimes against the state.

Prior to fascism's accommodations to the political right, fascism was a small, urban, northern Italian movement that had about a thousand members. After Fascism's accommodation of the political right, the fascist movement's membership soared to approximately 250,000 by 1921. A 2020 article by Daron Acemoğlu, Giuseppe De Feo, Giacomo De Luca, and Gianluca Russo in the Center for Economic and Policy Research, exploring the link between the threat of socialism and Mussolini's rise to power, found "a strong association between the Red Scare in Italy and the subsequent local support for the Fascist Party in the early 1920s". According to the authors, it was local elites and large landowners who played an important role in boosting Fascist Party activity and support, which did not come from socialists' core supporters but from centre-right voters, as they viewed traditional centre-right parties as ineffective in stopping socialism and so turned to the fascists. In 2003, historian Adrian Lyttelton wrote: "The expansion of Fascism in the rural areas was stimulated and directed by the reaction of the farmers and landowners against the peasant leagues of both Socialists and Catholics."

==== Fascist violence ====
Beginning in 1922, fascist paramilitaries escalated their strategy from one of attacking socialist offices and the homes of socialist leadership figures, to one of violent occupation of cities. The fascists met little serious resistance from authorities and proceeded to take over several northern Italian cities. The fascists attacked the headquarters of socialist and Catholic labour unions in Cremona and imposed forced Italianization upon the German-speaking population of Bolzano. After seizing these cities, the fascists made plans to take Rome.

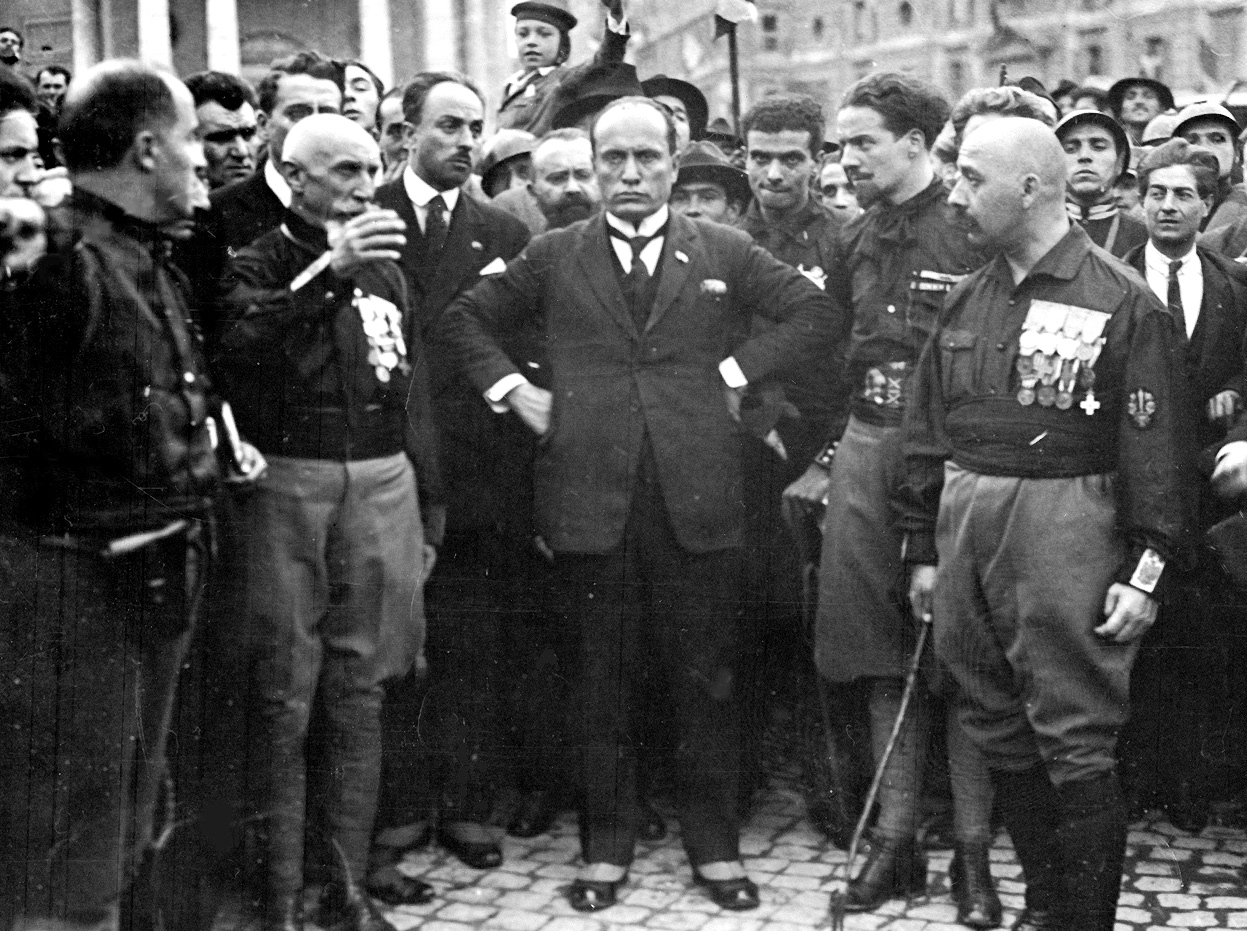
Benito Mussolini with three of the four quadrumvirs during the March on Rome (from left to right: unknown, de Bono, Mussolini, Balbo and de Vecchi)

On 24 October 1922, the Fascist Party held its annual congress in Naples, where Mussolini ordered Blackshirts to take control of public buildings and trains and to converge on three points around Rome. The Fascists managed to seize control of several post offices and trains in northern Italy while the Italian government, led by a left-wing coalition, was internally divided and unable to respond to the Fascist advances. King Victor Emmanuel III of Italy perceived the risk of bloodshed in Rome in response to attempting to disperse the Fascists to be too high. Victor Emmanuel III decided to appoint Mussolini as Prime Minister of Italy and Mussolini arrived in Rome on 30 October to accept the appointment. Fascist propaganda aggrandized this event, known as "March on Rome", as a "seizure" of power because of Fascists' heroic exploits.

=== Fascist Italy ===
==== Mussolini in power ====
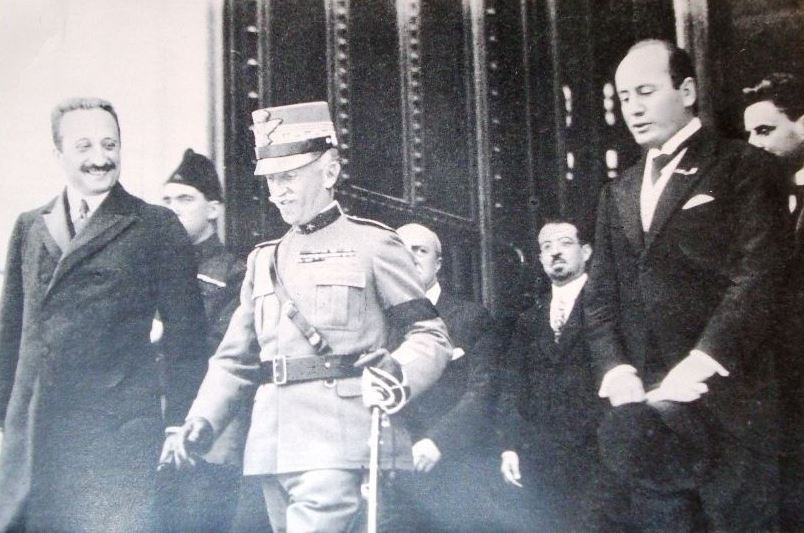
Victor Emmanuel III, King of Italy, with Mussolini.

Upon being appointed Prime Minister of Italy, Mussolini had to form a coalition government because the fascists did not have control over the Italian parliament. Mussolini's coalition government initially pursued economically liberal policies under the direction of liberal finance minister Alberto De Stefani, a member of the center of the National Fascist Party, including balancing the budget through deep cuts to the civil service. Initially, little drastic change in government policy had occurred and repressive police actions were limited.

The fascists began their attempt to entrench fascism in Italy with the Acerbo Law, which guaranteed a plurality of the seats in parliament to any party or coalition list in an election that received 25% or more of the vote. Through considerable fascist violence and intimidation, the list won a majority of the vote, allowing many seats to go to the fascists. In the aftermath of the election, a crisis and political scandal erupted after Socialist Party deputy Giacomo Matteotti was kidnapped and murdered by a Fascist. The liberals and the leftist minority in parliament walked out in protest in what became known as the Aventine Secession. On 3 January 1925, Mussolini addressed the Fascist-dominated Italian parliament and declared that he was personally responsible for what happened, but insisted that he had done nothing wrong. Mussolini proclaimed himself dictator of Italy, assuming full responsibility over the government and announcing the dismissal of parliament. From 1925 to 1929, fascism steadily became entrenched in power: opposition deputies were denied access to parliament, censorship was introduced and a December 1925 decree made Mussolini solely responsible to the King.

==== Corporatist economic system ====
The fascist regime created a corporatist economic system in 1925 with creation of the Palazzo Vidoni Pact, in which the Italian employers' association Confindustria and fascist trade unions agreed to recognize each other as the sole representatives of Italy's employers and employees, excluding non-fascist trade unions. The Fascist regime first created a Ministry of Corporations that organized the Italian economy into 22 sectoral corporations, banned workers' strikes and employers' lock-outs and in 1927 created the Charter of Labour, which established workers' rights and duties and created labour tribunals to arbitrate employer-employee disputes. In practice, the sectoral corporations exercised little independence and were largely controlled by the regime, and the employee organizations were rarely led by employees themselves, but instead by appointed Fascist party members.

==== Aggressive colonial and foreign policies ====
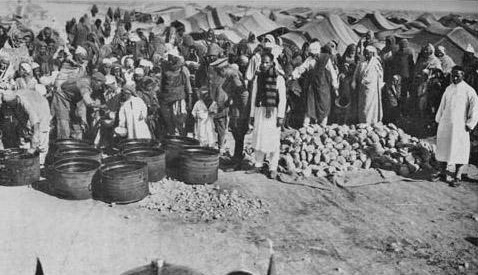
Inmates at the Sid Ahmed el Maghrun concentration camp in Libya during the Second Italo-Senussi War.

Beginning in the 1920s, Fascist Italy pursued an aggressive foreign policy that included ambitions to expand Italian territory. In response to revolt in the Italian colony of Libya, Fascist Italy abandoned previous liberal-era colonial policy of cooperation with local leaders. Instead, claiming that Italians were a superior race to African races and thereby had the right to colonize the "inferior" Africans, it sought to settle 10 to 15 million Italians in Libya. This resulted in an aggressive military campaign known as the Second Italo-Senussi War also known as the Pacification of Libya against natives in Libya, including mass killings, the use of concentration camps and the forced starvation of thousands of people. Italian authorities committed ethnic cleansing by forcibly expelling 100,000 Bedouin Cyrenaicans, half the population of Cyrenaica in Libya, from their settlements that was slated to be given to Italian settlers.

==== Nazi adoption of the Italian model ====
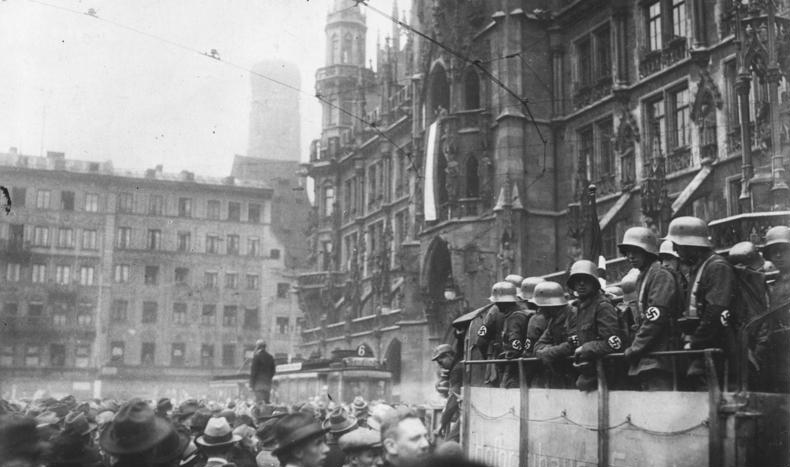
Nazis in Munich during the Beer Hall Putsch in November 1923.

The March on Rome brought fascism international attention. One early admirer of the Italian fascists was Adolf Hitler, who less than a month after the March had begun to model himself and the Nazi Party upon Mussolini and the Fascists. The Nazis, led by Hitler and the German war hero Erich Ludendorff, attempted a "March on Berlin" modeled upon the March on Rome, which resulted in the failed Beer Hall Putsch in Munich in November 1923.

=== International impact of the Great Depression and buildup to World War II ===
==== Spread of fascism outside Italy ====
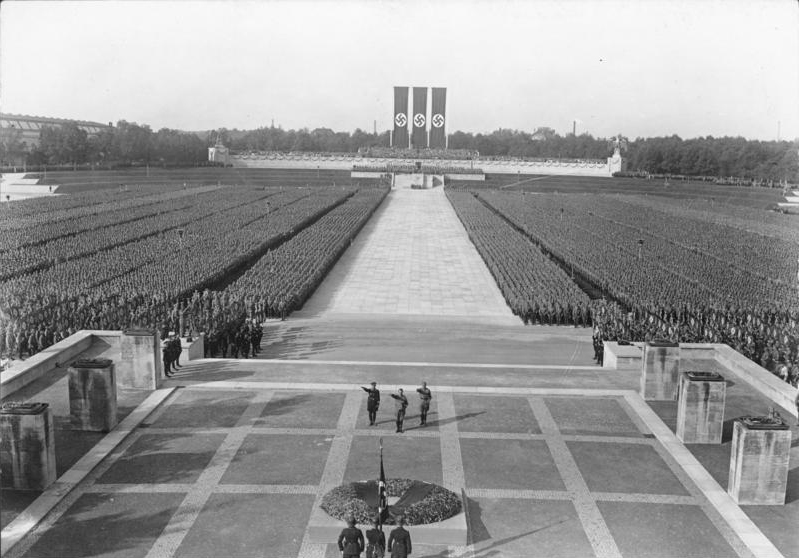
Nazi Party rally in Nuremberg, Germany, in 1934

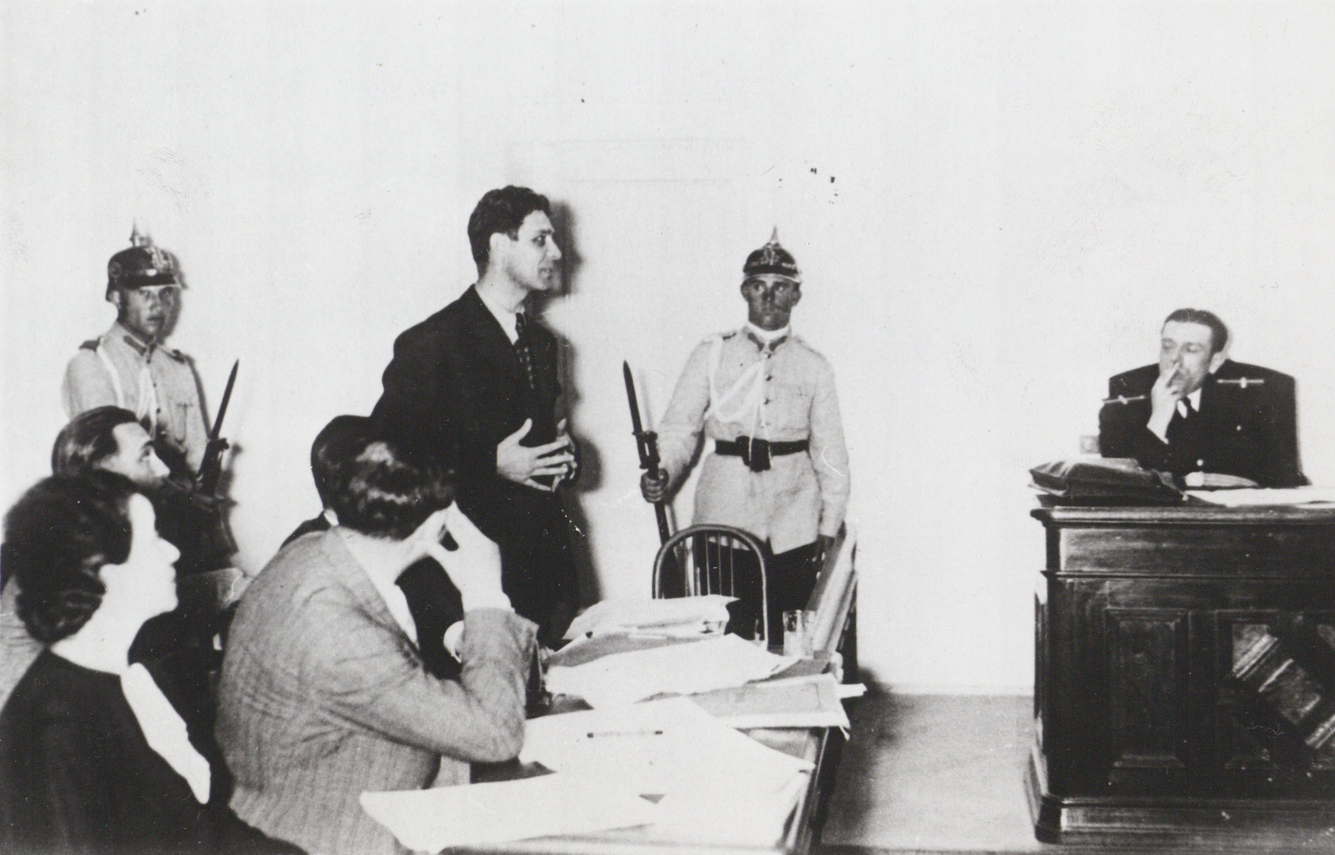
Corneliu Zelea Codreanu, the leader of the Romanian fascist Iron Guard, at the trial organized by the conservative dictatorship of Carol II, 1938

The conditions of economic hardship caused by the Great Depression brought about an international surge of social unrest. Fascist propaganda blamed the problems of the long depression of the 1930s on minorities and scapegoats: "Judeo-Masonic-bolshevik" conspiracies, left-wing internationalism and the presence of immigrants. Europe saw the rise of prominent fascist movements and arguably fascist regimes. Latin America was the continent with fascism most prominent outside of Europe, also experiencing a rise of fascist movements and some of its dictators adopting fascist trappings.

The rise to power of the Nazi Party led by Adolf Hitler was contributed to by the Great Depression in Germany. Hitler seizing power led to the demise of the Weimar Republic and the establishment of the fascist regime, Nazi Germany, under Hitler's leadership. With its establishment in 1933, liberal democracy was dissolved in Germany and the Nazis mobilized the country for war, with expansionist territorial aims against several countries. In the 1930s, the Nazis implemented racial laws that deliberately discriminated against, disenfranchised and persecuted Jews and other racial and minority groups.

There are historians affiliated with what is called the "new consensus" who confine fascism largely to Italy and Germany, as, according to them, only there the regimes were "revolutionary" anti-conservative, while terming the other regimes as para-fascist conservative without the fascist "genuine social revolution". Nevertheless, regimes in Europe, Fascist Italy and Nazi Germany included, often were to varying extents alliances of fascist movements and conservative elites. Germany, where the right (conservatives included) had been more radical before 1933 and Volksgemeinschaft adopted by the Nazis, reached a qualitatively greater fascization under the Nazi rule compared to Italy and the other regimes. A product similar to Fascist Italy was Francoist Spain established in the Spanish Civil War as a compromise between Falangism, a radical social form of fascism, and authoritarian clerical tendencies. In Austria, the February 1934 uprising led to the establishment of the regime called "Austrofascist", a blend of Christian Social and Heimwehr elements.

In some countries, fascist movements failed to seize power, in some due to the opposition from the conservatives. In 1932, Gyula Gömbös was appointed the Prime Minister of the authoritarian Kingdom of Hungary, advancing a fascism stemming out of the 'Szeged Idea' laying in the counter-revolutionary foundation of the Kingdom. But he had to struggle with the conservatives and died before defeating the opposition to him. The fascist Iron Guard in Romania were strong, but met the opposition of the King Carol II, who, after working with a rivalling fascist movement, introduced a dictatorship with fascist trappings. Having overthrown the King with the support of General Ion Antonescu in 1940, the Iron Guard became the only fascist movement outside Germany and Italy to come to power without foreign assistance, but were repressed next year as they revolted. During the 6 February 1934 crisis, six février, France faced the greatest domestic political turmoil since the Dreyfus Affair, when multiple far-right movements approaching Fascism and Nazism to different extents rioted in Paris against the French government resulting in major political violence. Followers of the ideas of this arguably fascist uprising, at least for the contemporaries, continued to destabilize the republic, and it "seemed that the 'spirit' of the six février had finally materialised" into Vichy France in 1940.

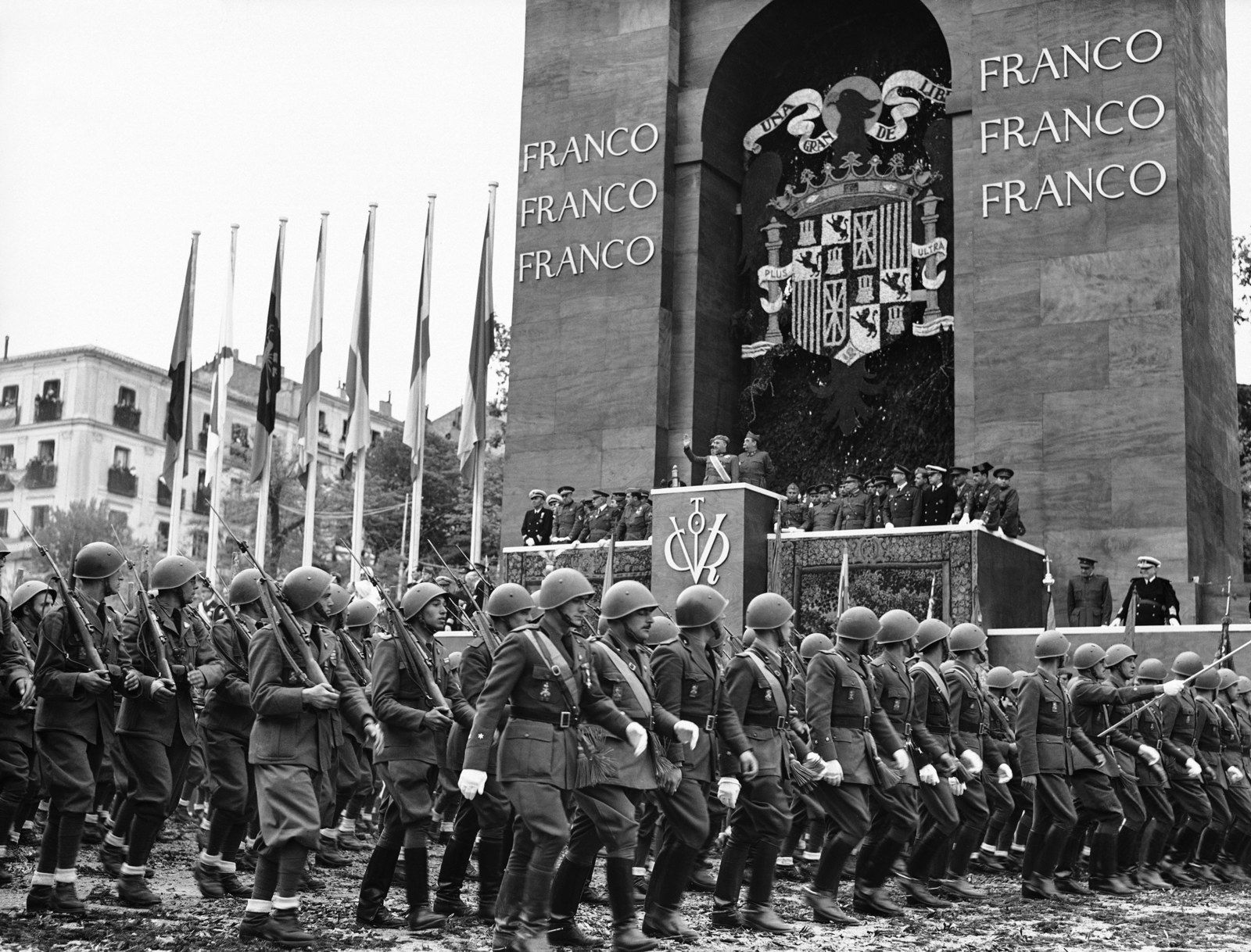
Francisco Franco (at the tribune) performing the Roman salute during the parade celebrating his victory in the Spanish Civil War. Franco headed the FET y de las JONS and became recognized as a fascist leader by contemporaries. Whether it was accurate is subject to historical debate

The Spanish Civil War of 1936–1939 was among the key events in the history of fascism and in the interwar period, altering the corse of world politics and seen as a war of fascism and democracy and eventually as the prelude to World War II. The army led by Francisco Franco allied with Mussolini and Hitler waged a war against the Spanish Republic, democracy and progressive ideas, and Freemasonry. Franco headed the fascist party FET y de las JONS and presented himself and became recognized as a fascist leader, but whether his dictatorship was fascist is subject to historical debate. Those rejecting it (Paxton, "new consensus") emphasize its traditionalism and that power was seized by the officer Franco who co-opted Falangism, not by a mass movement. The counter-arguments (Paul Preston, Julian Casanova, Ferran Gallego) are that Franco's Nacionales acted as a united mass movement, that the Franco-led Nacionales were defined by the radicalization of war, and that the functioning and the ideology of the regime were similar to fascism, to the points of revitalizing the nation through cleansing of war and striving for a "new man". Some historians suggest that regime underwent a fascist phase but gradually moved away from fascism after World War II.

==== Fascist economic policies during the Great Depression ====
During the Great Depression, Mussolini promoted active state intervention in the economy. He denounced the contemporary "supercapitalism" that he claimed began in 1914 as a failure because of its alleged decadence, its support for unlimited consumerism, and its intention to create the "standardization of humankind". Fascist Italy created the Institute for Industrial Reconstruction (IRI), a giant state-owned firm and holding company that provided state funding to failing private enterprises. The IRI was made a permanent institution in Fascist Italy in 1937, pursued fascist policies to create national autarky and had the power to take over private firms to maximize war production. While Hitler's regime only nationalized 500 companies in key industries by the early 1940s, Mussolini declared in 1934, "[t]hree-fourths of Italian economy, industrial and agricultural, is in the hands of the state."

Due to the worldwide depression, Mussolini's government was able to take over most of Italy's largest failing banks, who held controlling interest in many Italian businesses. The IRI reported in early 1934 that they held assets of "48.5 percent of the share capital of Italy", which later included the capital of the banks themselves. Political historian Martin Blinkhorn estimated Italy's scope of state intervention and ownership "greatly surpassed that in Nazi Germany, giving Italy a public sector second only to that of Stalin's Russia". In the late 1930s, Italy enacted manufacturing cartels, tariff barriers, currency restrictions and massive regulation of the economy to attempt to balance payments. Italy's policy of autarky failed to achieve effective economic autonomy. Nazi Germany similarly pursued an economic agenda with the aims of autarky and rearmament and imposed protectionist policies, including forcing the German steel industry to use lower-quality German iron ore rather than superior-quality imported iron.

==== Buildup to World War II ====
In Fascist Italy and Nazi Germany, both Mussolini and Hitler pursued territorial expansionist and interventionist foreign policy agendas from the 1930s through the 1940s culminating in World War II. From 1935 to 1939, Germany and Italy escalated their demands for territorial claims and greater influence in world affairs. Italy invaded Ethiopia in 1935 resulting in its condemnation by the League of Nations and its widespread diplomatic isolation. In 1936, Germany remilitarized the industrial Rhineland, a region that had been ordered demilitarized by the Treaty of Versailles. In 1938, Germany annexed Austria and Italy assisted Germany in resolving the diplomatic crisis between Germany versus Britain and France over claims on Czechoslovakia by arranging the Munich Agreement that gave Germany the Sudetenland and was perceived at the time to have averted a European war. These hopes faded when Czechoslovakia was dissolved by the proclamation of the German client state of Slovakia, followed by the next day of the occupation of the remaining Czech Lands and the proclamation of the German Protectorate of Bohemia and Moravia. At the same time from 1938 to 1939, Italy was demanding territorial and colonial concessions from France and Britain. In 1939, Germany prepared for war with Poland, but attempted to gain territorial concessions from Poland through diplomatic means. The Polish government did not trust Hitler's promises and refused to accept Germany's demands.

=== World War II (1939–1945) ===
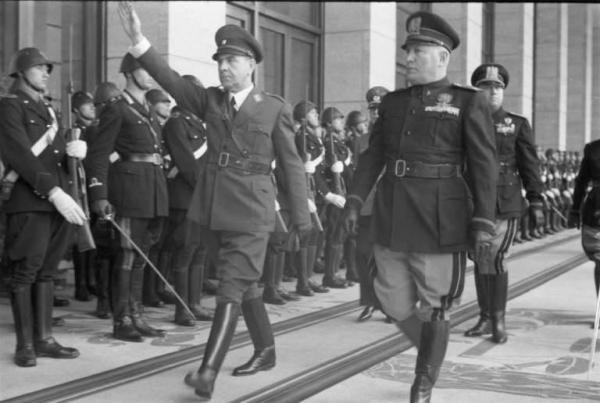
Ante Pavelić, Poglavnik of the Independent State of Croatia (NDH) and leader of the fascist Ustaše, with Mussolini on 18 May 1941 in Rome.

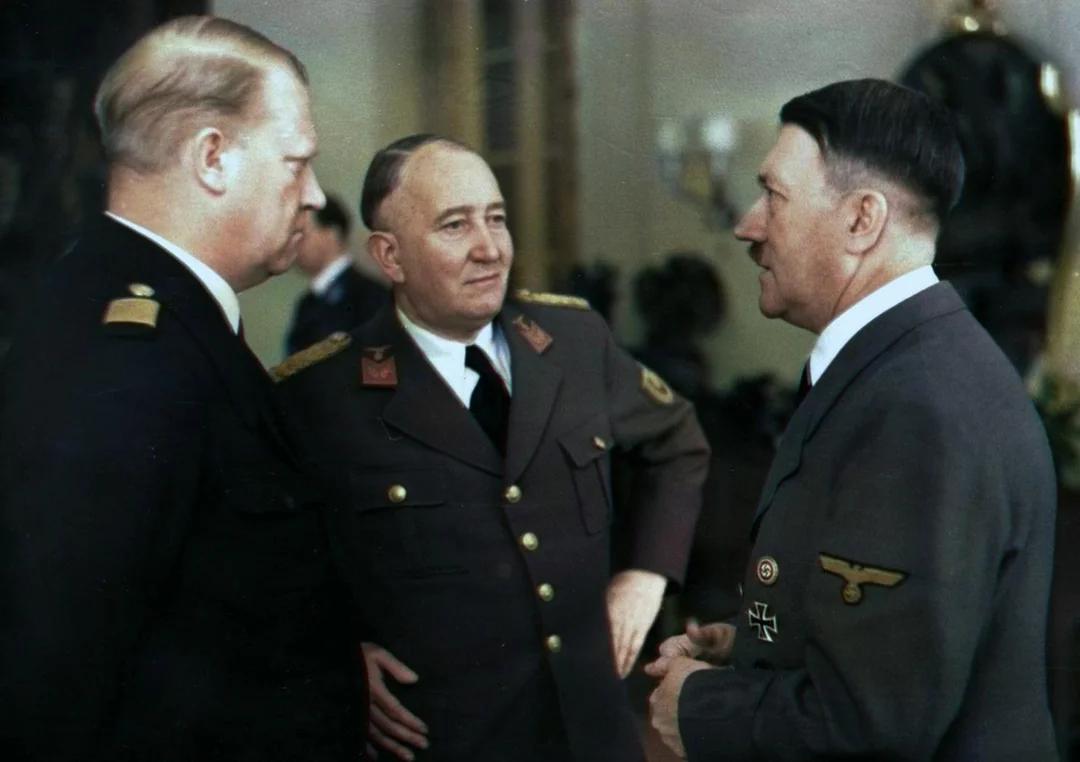
Vidkun Quisling, Prime Minister of the Quisling regime in Norway and leader of the fascist Nasjonal Samling (left) with Hitler on 13 February 1942 in Berlin.

In 1939 Germany invaded Poland, the invasion of Poland was deemed unacceptable by Britain, France and their allies, leading to their mutual declaration of war against Germany and the start of World War II. In 1940, Mussolini led Italy into World War II on the side of the Axis. During World War II, the Axis Powers in Europe led by Nazi Germany participated in the extermination of millions of Jews, Poles, Roma, Sinti and others in the genocide known as the Holocaust. In 1943, after Italy faced multiple military failures, the complete reliance and subordination of Italy to Germany, the Allied invasion of Italy and the corresponding international humiliation, Mussolini was removed as head of government and arrested on the order of King Victor Emmanuel III, who proceeded to dismantle the Fascist state and declared Italy's switching of allegiance to the Allied side. Mussolini was rescued from arrest by German forces and led the German client state, the Italian Social Republic from 1943 to 1945. Nazi Germany faced multiple losses and steady Soviet and Western Allied offensives from 1943 to 1945.

On 28 April 1945, Mussolini was captured and executed by Italian communist partisans. On 30 April 1945, Hitler committed suicide. Shortly afterwards, Germany surrendered and the Nazi regime was systematically dismantled by the occupying Allied powers. An International Military Tribunal was subsequently convened in Nuremberg. Beginning in November 1945 and lasting through 1949, numerous Nazi political, military and economic leaders were tried and convicted of war crimes, with many of the worst offenders being sentenced to death and executed.

=== Post-World War II (1945–2008) ===
The victory of the Allies over the Axis powers in World War II led to the collapse of many fascist regimes in Europe. The Nuremberg Trials convicted several Nazi leaders of crimes against humanity involving the Holocaust. However, there remained several movements and governments that were ideologically related to fascism.

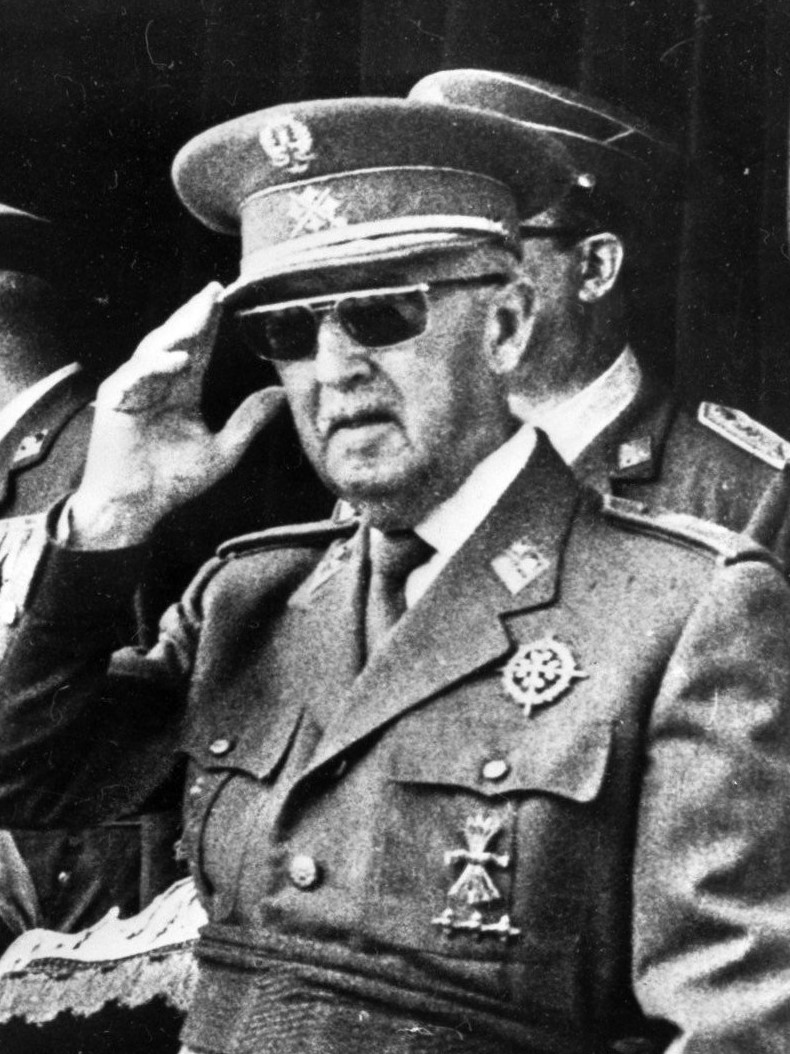
After 1945, Franco was labelled the "last surviving fascist dictator" by the contemporaries, while his regime supported "ratlines" for war criminals and neo-fascist movements in Europe. His regime evolved towards more conventional authoritaritarianism after 1945 by form while keeping its main principles and a "major radical fascist ingredient"

Francoist Spain described above remained formally neutral during World War II, though leaned towards the Axis. After the collapse of Italian Fascism in 1943, Franco shifted towards a more neutrality, while still maintaining relations with the Italian Social Republic, the Nazi-controlled radical fascist puppet state in Italy defeated in 1945. Franco's regime survived 1945, but faced isolation, as the hostile foreign opinion labelled him the "last surviving fascist dictator". After 1943-1945, Francoism underwent certain cosmetic changes and began formally identifying itself rather with Catholicism and anti-communism, but did not alter itself significantly, keeping its base principles. More to it, it continued tying itself to fascism: in 1945, it helped a number of fascists, including war criminals, like Ante Pavelić and Otto Skorzeny, flee Italy and Germany; by 1951, Spain established the ties with the Italian Social Movement (MSI), the party of the surviving Fascists - now, neo-Fascists - and started financing it. Franco's Falange along with the MSI joined the neo-fascist European Social Movement. This cooperation continued even in the 1960s, but by 1953 Spain became a member of the Western bloc of the Cold War, aided by the US and enjoying recognition for anti-communism. While Falangists remained loyal to the regime, the radical ideas were gradually marginalized, while the form of the regime moved towards more conventional authoritaritarianism - but it remained the only regime with a "major radical fascist ingredient."

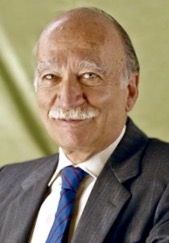
Giorgio Almirante, leader of the Italian Social Movement from 1969 to 1987

The term neo-fascism refers to fascist movements that generally originated after World War II. According to Jean-Yves Camus and Nicolas Lebourg, the neo-fascist ideology emerged in 1942, after Nazi Germany invaded the USSR and decided to reorient its propaganda on a Europeanist ground. In Italy, the Italian Social Movement led by Giorgio Almirante was a major neo-fascist movement that transformed itself into a self-described "post-fascist" movement called the National Alliance (AN), which has been an ally of Silvio Berlusconi's Forza Italia for a decade. In 2008, AN joined Forza Italia in Berlusconi's new party The People of Freedom, but in 2012 a group of politicians split from The People of Freedom, refounding the party with the name Brothers of Italy. In Germany, various neo-Nazi movements have been formed and banned in accordance with Germany's constitutional law which forbids Nazism. The National Democratic Party of Germany (NPD) is widely considered a neo-Nazi party, although the party does not publicly identify itself as such.

=== Contemporary fascism (2008–present) ===
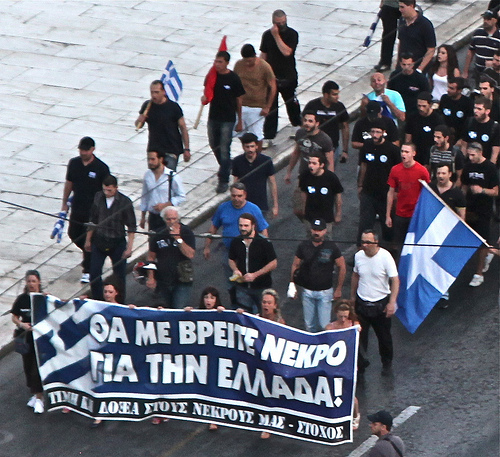
Golden Dawn demonstration in Greece in 2012

Since the Great Recession of 2008, fascism has seen an international surge in popularity, alongside closely associated phenomena like xenophobia, antisemitism, authoritarianism and euroskepticism.

==== Greece ====
After the onset of the Great Recession and economic crisis in Greece, a movement known as the Golden Dawn, widely considered a neo-Nazi party, soared in support out of obscurity and won seats in Greece's parliament, espousing a staunch hostility towards minorities, illegal immigrants and refugees. In 2013, after the murder of an anti-fascist musician by a person with links to Golden Dawn, the Greek government ordered the arrest of Golden Dawn's leader Nikolaos Michaloliakos and other members on charges related to being associated with a criminal organization. On 7 October 2020, Athens Appeals Court announced verdicts for 68 defendants, including the party's political leadership. Nikolaos Michaloliakos and six other prominent members and former members of parliament (MPs) were found guilty of running a criminal organization. Guilty verdicts were delivered on charges of murder, attempted murder, and violent attacks on immigrants and left-wing political opponents.

==== Russia ====
Since the crackdown on the opposition in Russia under Vladimir Putin and the following 2022 Russian invasion of Ukraine, justified by Putin's claims that Ukraine is fascist and ruled by "Nazis", Russia has been described as fascist increasingly more often. The American historian and political scientist Alexander J. Motyl wrote that "a reconsideration of the" "applicability" of the term 'fascist' "to Russia is definitely in order." According to him, Russian fascism has the following characteristics:

- An undemocratic political system, different from both traditional authoritarianism and totalitarianism;
- Statism and hypernationalism;
- A hypermasculine cult of the supreme leader (emphasis on his courage, militancy and physical prowess);
- General popular support for the regime and its leader.

In 2022, the Yale historian Timothy Snyder stated that "Putin's regime is ... the world center of fascism" and wrote an article entitled "We Should Say It: Russia Is Fascist".

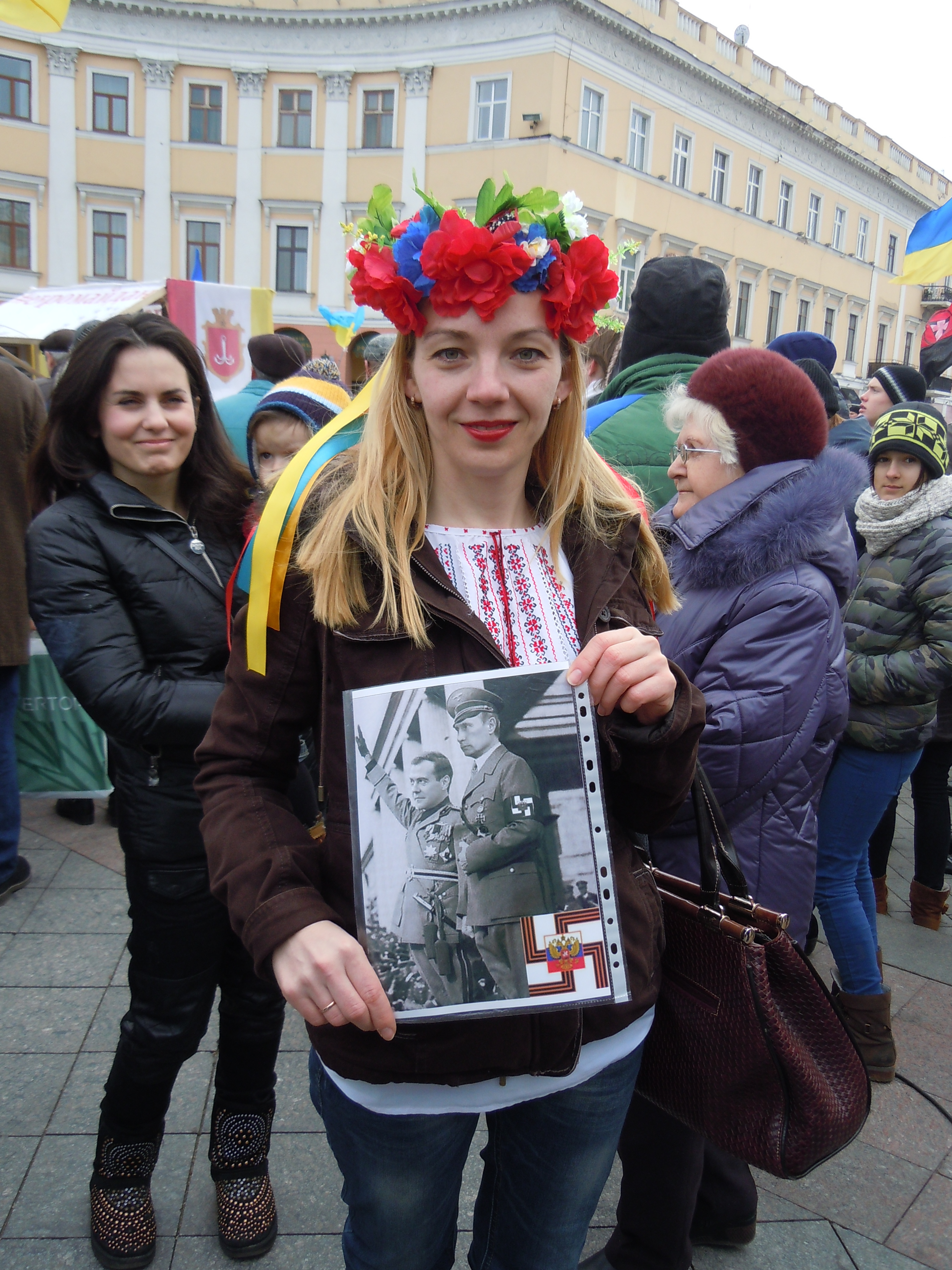
Protester against the Russian government, holding an image portraying Dmitry Medvedev and Vladimir Putin as Nazis with a swastika made of colours of the Ribbon of Saint George and a Russian coat of arms in the centre (Odesa, 2014)

Such definitions raised criticism from analysts who disagreed. The French political scientist Marlène Laruelle wrote in The Washington Quarterly in 2022 that "applying the "fascism" label ... to the entirety of the Russian state or society short-circuits our ability to construct a more complex and differentiated picture." In Is Russia Fascist? (2021) she wrote that the accusation of "fascism" has evolved into a strategic narrative of the existing world order where the moral high ground might be asserted through branding ideological rivals as fascists, regardless of their real ideals or deeds; and that Russia does it in regards to Ukraine. The experts on fascism questioned by Radio Free Europe/Radio Liberty - the "new consensus" historians Payne ad Griffin (see above), also Sheri Berman and Andreas Umland - said that while Russia is repressive and authoritarian, it cannot be classified as a fascist state for various reasons, including Russia's government being "more reactionary than revolutionary." Griffin compared Putinism to the World War II Empire of Japan, saying that both "emulated fascism in many ways, but [were] not fascist": according to Griffin, Putin as a reactionary wants "to recreate a modified version of the Soviet Union" as opposed to a "revolutionary" "new order" and a new system and works similarly to Viktor Orban's 'illiberal' Hungary. Similarly, Payne said that while Putinism "forms the nearest analogue to fascism found in a major country since that time," it's "more a revival of the creed of Tsar Nicholas I in the 19th century that emphasized 'Orthodoxy, autocracy, and nationality' than one resembling the revolutionary, modernizing regimes of Hitler and Mussolini." Umland contrasted Putin to 'genuine fascists' like Vladimir Zhirinovsky and Aleksandr Dugin, who "describe in their writings a completely new Russia", but served as "mere attributes of Putin's political system." Finally, according to Maria Snegovaya and Berman, Putinism lacks "a vision of the future" and fascist mass mobilization.

==== United States ====
While initially composed of distinctive movements, in the 21st century, many U.S. Neo-Nazi groups have moved towards more decentralized organization and online social networks with a terroristic focus. After the election of Donald Trump, fascist groups began coalescing around his right-wing populism to take advantage of it. In 2017, the Unite the Right rally saw marchers come together from a variety of far-right groups and movements, including members of the alt-right, neo-Confederates, neo-fascists, white nationalists, neo-Nazis, Klansmen, and far-right militias. Around this period, a number of prominent fascist groups were also founded, including the Proud Boys and Patriot Front.

== Tenets ==
Robert Paxton finds that even though fascism "maintained the existing regime of property and social hierarchy", it cannot be considered "simply a more muscular form of conservatism" because "fascism in power did carry out some changes profound enough to be called 'revolutionary'". These transformations "often set fascists into conflict with conservatives rooted in families, churches, social rank, and property". Paxton argues:

fascism redrew the frontiers between private and public, sharply diminishing what had once been untouchably private. It changed the practice of citizenship from the enjoyment of constitutional rights and duties to participation in mass ceremonies of affirmation and conformity. It reconfigured relations between the individual and the collectivity, so that an individual had no rights outside community interest. It expanded the powers of the executive—party and state—in a bid for total control. Finally, it unleashed aggressive emotions hitherto known in Europe only during war or social revolution.

=== Ultranationalism ===
Ultranationalism, combined with the myth of national rebirth, is a key foundation of fascism. Robert Paxton argues that "a passionate nationalism" is the basis of fascism, combined with "a conspiratorial and Manichean view of history" which holds, "the chosen people have been weakened by political parties, social classes, unassimilable minorities, spoiled rentiers, and rationalist thinkers." Roger Griffin identifies the core of fascism as being palingenetic ultranationalism.

The fascist view of a nation is of a single organic entity that binds people together by their ancestry and is a natural unifying force of people. Fascism seeks to solve economic, political, and social problems by achieving a millenarian national rebirth, exalting the nation or race above all else and promoting cults of unity, strength, and purity. European fascist movements typically espouse a racist conception of non-Europeans being inferior to Europeans. Beyond this, European fascists have not held a unified set of racial views. Historically, most fascists promoted imperialism, although there have been several fascist movements that were uninterested in the pursuit of new imperial ambitions. For example, Nazism and Italian Fascism were expansionist and irredentist. Falangism in Spain envisioned the worldwide unification of Spanish-speaking peoples (Hispanidad). British Fascism was non-interventionist, though it did embrace the British Empire.

=== Totalitarianism ===
Fascism promotes the establishment of a totalitarian state. It opposes liberal democracy, rejects multi-party systems, and typically supports a one-party state. Mussolini's The Doctrine of Fascism (1932), partly ghostwritten by philosopher Giovanni Gentile, who Mussolini described as "the philosopher of Fascism", states: "The Fascist conception of the State is all-embracing; outside of it no human or spiritual values can exist, much less have value. Thus understood, Fascism is totalitarian, and the Fascist State—a synthesis and a unit inclusive of all values—interprets, develops, and potentiates the whole life of a people."

Fascist states pursued policies of social indoctrination through propaganda in education and the media, and regulation of the production of educational and media materials. Education was designed to glorify the fascist movement and inform students of its historical and political importance to the nation. It attempted to purge ideas that were not consistent with the beliefs of the fascist movement and to teach students to be obedient to the state.

=== Economy ===
Historians and other scholars disagree on the question of whether a specifically fascist type of economic policy can be said to exist. David Baker argues that there is an identifiable economic system in fascism that is distinct from those advocated by other ideologies, comprising essential characteristics that fascist nations shared. Payne, Paxton, Sternhell et al. argue that while fascist economies share some similarities, there is no distinctive form of fascist economic organization. Gerald Feldman and Timothy Mason argue that fascism is distinguished by an absence of coherent economic ideology and a lack of serious economic thinking. They state that the decisions taken by fascist leaders cannot be explained within a logical economic framework.

Fascists presented their views as an alternative to both international socialism and free-market economics. While fascism opposed mainstream socialism, fascists sometimes regarded their movement as a type of nationalist "socialism" to highlight their commitment to nationalism, describing it as national solidarity and unity. Fascism had a complex relationship with capitalism, both supporting and opposing different aspects of it at different times and in different countries. In general, fascists held an instrumental view of capitalism, regarding it as a tool that may be useful or not, depending on circumstances. Fascist governments typically established close connections between big business and the state, and business was expected to serve the interests of the government. Economic self-sufficiency, known as autarky, was a major goal of most fascist governments.

Fascist governments advocated for the resolution of domestic class conflict within a nation in order to guarantee national unity. This would be done through the state's mediating relations between the classes (contrary to the views of classical liberal–inspired capitalists). While fascism was opposed to domestic class conflict, it held that bourgeois–proletarian conflict existed primarily in international conflict between proletarian nations and bourgeois nations. Fascism condemned what it viewed as widespread character traits that it associated with the typical bourgeois mentality that it opposed, such as materialism, crassness, cowardice, and the inability to comprehend the heroic ideal of the fascist "warrior"; and associations with liberalism, individualism, and parliamentarianism. From 1914, Enrico Corradini developed the idea of "proletarian nations", defining proletarian as being one and the same with producers, a productivist perspective that associated all people deemed productive, including entrepreneurs, technicians, workers and soldiers as being proletarian. Mussolini adopted this view in his description of the proletarian character.

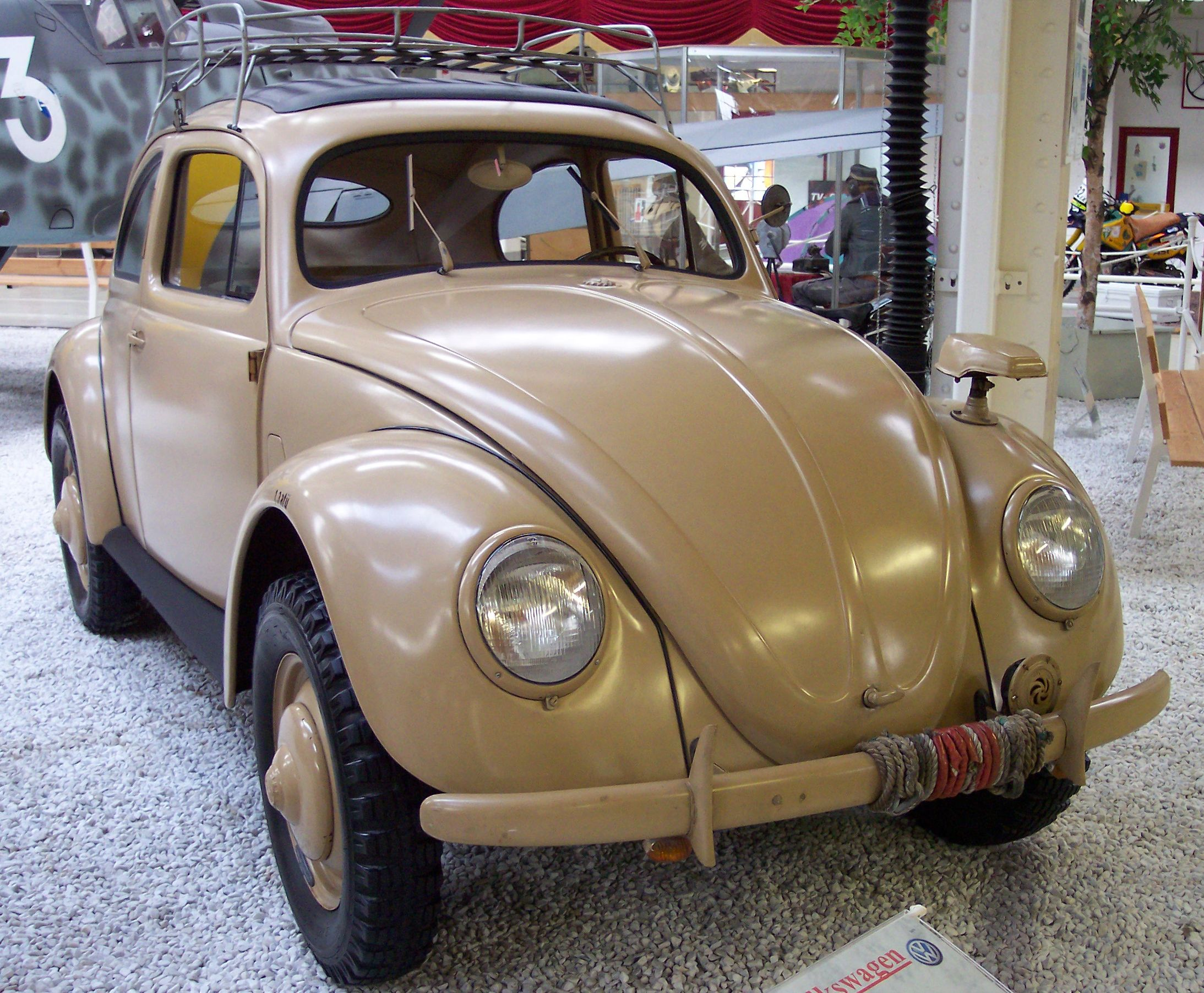
The need for a people's car (Volkswagen in German), its concept and its functional objectives were formulated by Adolf Hitler.

Because productivism was key to creating a strong nationalist state, it criticized internationalist and Marxist socialism, advocating instead to represent a type of nationalist productivist socialism. Nevertheless, while condemning parasitical capitalism, it was willing to accommodate productivist capitalism within it so long as it supported the nationalist objective. The role of productivism was derived from Henri de Saint Simon, whose ideas inspired the creation of utopian socialism and influenced other ideologies that stressed solidarity rather than class war and whose conception of productive people in the economy included both productive workers and productive bosses to challenge the influence of the aristocracy and unproductive financial speculators. Saint Simon's vision combined the traditionalist right-wing criticisms of the French Revolution with a left-wing belief in the need for association or collaboration of productive people in society. Whereas Marxism condemned capitalism as a system of exploitative property relations, fascism saw the nature of the control of credit and money in the contemporary capitalist system as abusive.

Unlike Marxism, fascism did not see class conflict between the Marxist-defined proletariat and the bourgeoisie as a given or as an engine of historical materialism. Instead, it viewed workers and productive capitalists in common as productive people who were in conflict with parasitic elements in society, including corrupt political parties, corrupt financial capital, and feeble people. Fascist leaders such as Mussolini and Hitler spoke of the need to create a new managerial elite led by engineers and captains of industry—but free from the parasitic leadership of industries. Hitler stated that the Nazi Party supported bodenständigen Kapitalismus ("productive capitalism") that was based upon profit earned from one's own labour, but condemned unproductive capitalism or loan capitalism, which derived profit from speculation.

Fascist economics supported a state-controlled economy that accepted a mix of private and public ownership over the means of production. Economic planning was applied to both the public and private sectors, and the prosperity of private enterprise depended on its acceptance of synchronizing itself with the economic goals of the state. Fascist economic ideology supported the profit motive but emphasized that industries must uphold the national interest as superior to private profit.

While fascism accepted the importance of material wealth and power, it condemned materialism, which was identified as being present in both communism and capitalism, and criticized materialism for lacking acknowledgment of the role of the spirit. In particular, fascists criticized capitalism, not because of its competitive nature nor support of private property, which fascists supported—but due to its materialism, individualism, alleged bourgeois decadence and alleged indifference to the nation. Fascism denounced Marxism for its advocacy of materialist internationalist class identity, which fascists regarded as an attack upon the emotional and spiritual bonds of the nation and a threat to the achievement of genuine national solidarity.

In discussing the spread of fascism beyond Italy, historian Philip Morgan states:

Since the Depression was a crisis of laissez-faire capitalism and its political counterpart, parliamentary democracy, fascism could pose as the 'third-way' alternative between capitalism and Bolshevism, the model of a new European 'civilization.' As Mussolini typically put it in early 1934, 'from 1929 ... fascism has become a universal phenomenon ... The dominant forces of the 19th century, democracy, socialism, [and] liberalism have been exhausted ... the new political and economic forms of the twentieth-century are fascist'.

Fascists criticized egalitarianism as preserving the weak and instead promoted social Darwinist views and policies. They were in principle opposed to the idea of social welfare, arguing that it "encouraged the preservation of the degenerate and the feeble". The Nazi Party condemned the welfare system of the Weimar Republic, as well as private charity and philanthropy, for supporting people whom they regarded as racially inferior and weak and who should have been weeded out in the process of natural selection. Nevertheless, faced with the mass unemployment and poverty of the Great Depression, the Nazis found it necessary to set up charitable institutions to help racially pure Germans in order to maintain popular support while arguing that this represented "racial self-help" and not indiscriminate charity or universal social welfare. Thus, Nazi programs such as the Winter Relief of the German People and the broader National Socialist People's Welfare (NSV) were organized as quasi-private institutions, officially relying on private donations from Germans to help others of their race—although in practice those who refused to donate could face severe consequences. Unlike the social welfare institutions of the Weimar Republic and the Christian charities, the NSV distributed assistance on explicitly racial grounds. It provided support only to those who were "racially sound, capable of and willing to work, politically reliable, and willing and able to reproduce". Non-Aryans were excluded, as well as the "work-shy", "asocials" and the "hereditarily ill". Under these conditions, by 1939, over 17 million Germans had obtained assistance from the NSV, and the agency "projected a powerful image of caring and support" for "those who were judged to have got into difficulties through no fault of their own". Yet the organization was "feared and disliked among society's poorest" because it resorted to intrusive questioning and monitoring to judge who was worthy of support.

=== Direct action ===
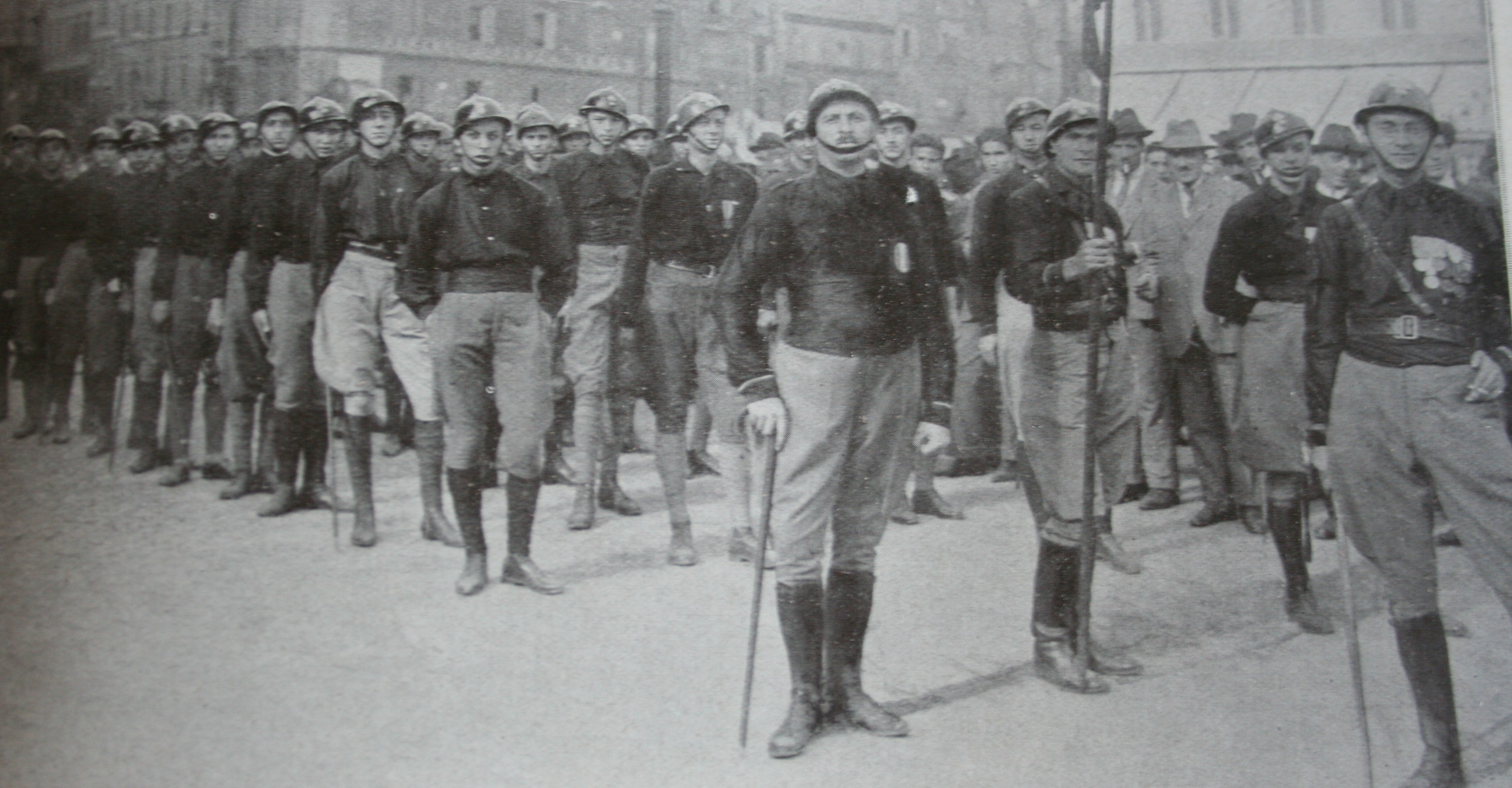
Fascist Blackshirts during the March on Rome in October 1922.

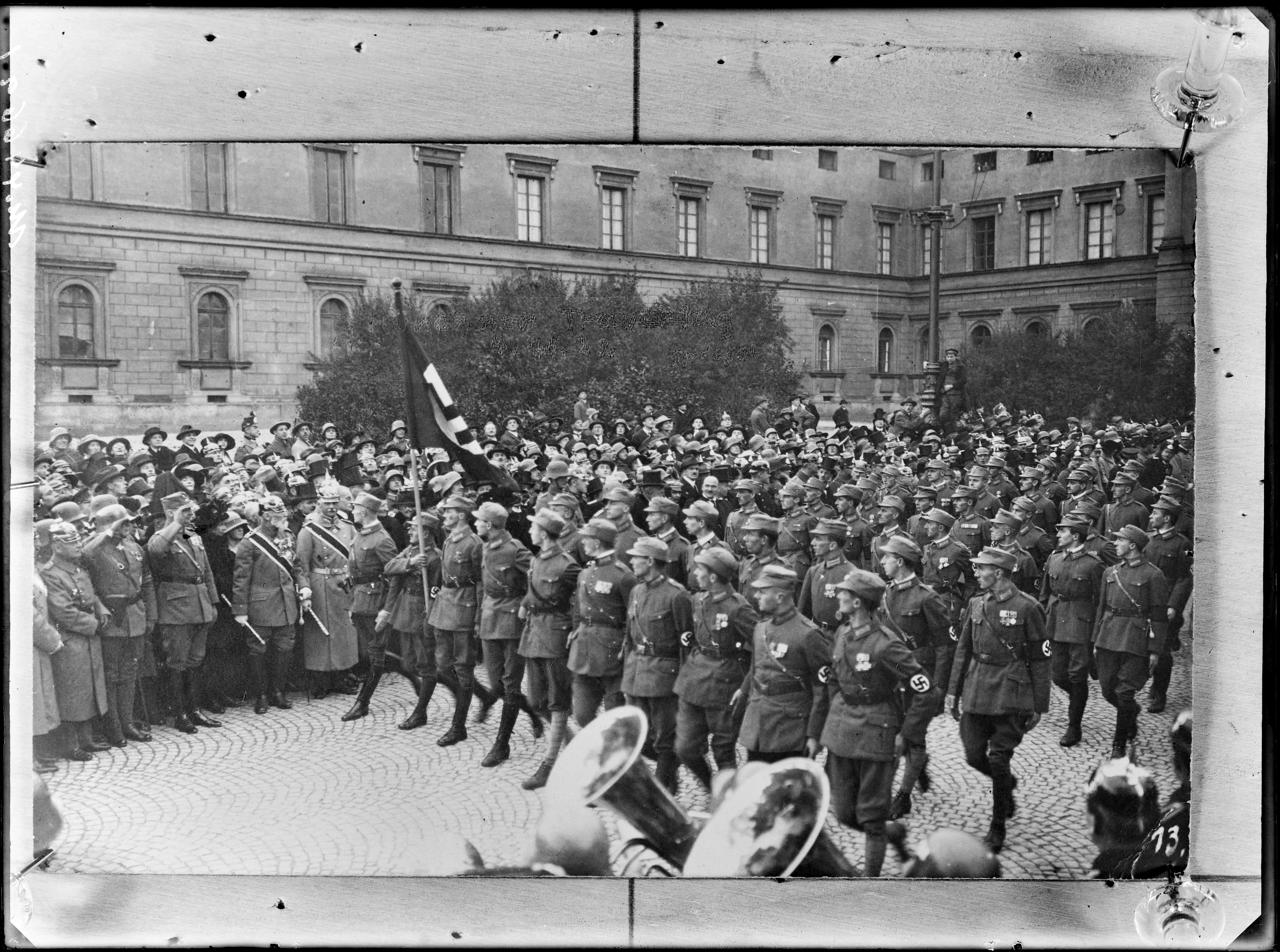
Nazi Sturmabteilung members marching on 4 November 1923 days before the Beer Hall Putsch.

Fascism emphasizes direct action, including supporting the legitimacy of political violence, as a core part of its politics. Fascism views violent action as a necessity in politics that fascism identifies as being an "endless struggle"; this emphasis on the use of political violence means that most fascist parties have also created their own party militias (e.g. the National Fascist Party's Blackshirts and the Nazi Party's Sturmabteilung (commonly known as the Brownshirts). The basis of fascism's support of violent action in politics is connected to social Darwinism. Fascist movements have commonly held social Darwinist views of nations, races, and societies. They say that nations and races must purge themselves of socially and biologically weak or degenerate people while simultaneously promoting the creation of strong people in order to survive in a world defined by perpetual national and racial conflict.

=== Age and gender roles ===
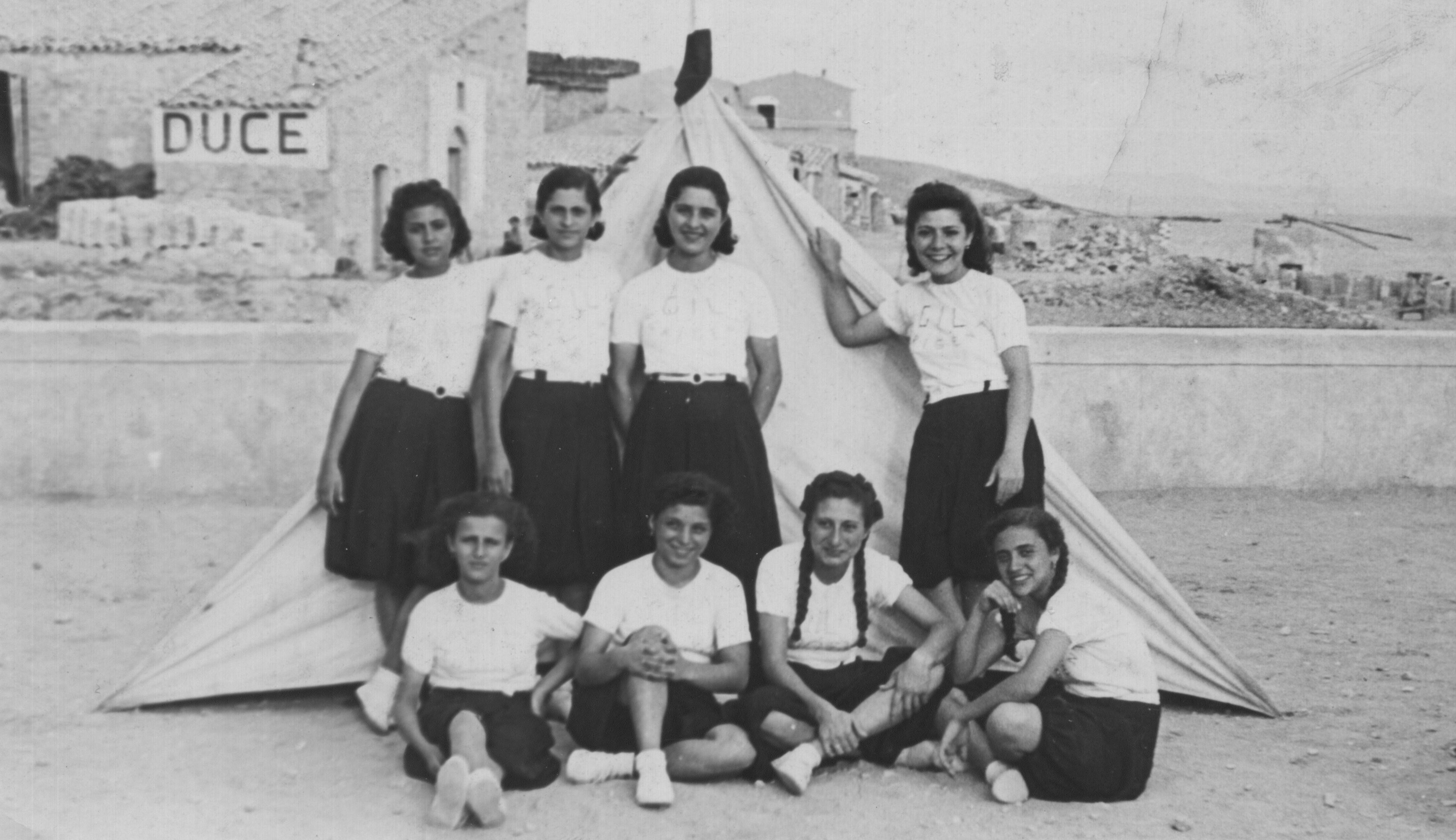
Members of the Piccole Italiane, an organization for girls within the National Fascist Party in Italy

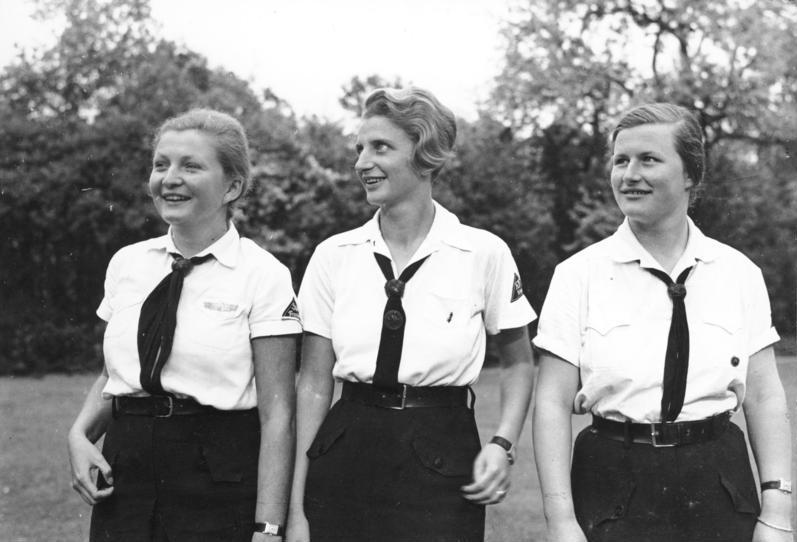
Members of the League of German Girls, an organization for girls within the Nazi Party in Germany

Fascism emphasizes youth both in a physical sense of age and a spiritual sense as related to virility and commitment to action. The Italian Fascists' political anthem was called Giovinezza ("The Youth"). Fascism identifies the physical age period of youth as a critical time for the moral development of people who will affect society. Walter Laqueur argues "[t]he corollaries of the cult of war and physical danger were the cult of brutality, strength, and sexuality ... [fascism is] a true counter-civilization: rejecting the sophisticated rationalist humanism of Old Europe, fascism sets up as its ideal the primitive instincts and primal emotions of the barbarian."

Italian fascism pursued what it called "moral hygiene" of youth, particularly regarding sexuality. Fascist Italy promoted what it considered normal sexual behaviour in youth while denouncing what it considered deviant sexual behaviour. It condemned pornography, most forms of birth control and contraceptive devices (with the exception of the condom), homosexuality and prostitution as deviant sexual behaviour. However, enforcement of laws opposed to such practices was erratic, and authorities often looked the other way. Fascist Italy regarded the promotion of male sexual excitation before puberty as the cause of criminality amongst male youth, declared homosexuality a social disease and pursued an aggressive campaign to reduce prostitution of young women.

Mussolini perceived women's primary role as primarily child bearers, while that of men as warriors, once saying: "War is to man what maternity is to the woman." In an effort to increase birth rates, the Italian Fascist government gave financial incentives to women who raised large families and initiated policies intended to reduce the number of women employed. Italian Fascism called for women to be honoured as "reproducers of the nation", and the Italian Fascist government held ritual ceremonies to celebrate women's role as such within the Italian nation. In 1934, Mussolini declared that employment of women was a "major aspect of the thorny problem of unemployment" and that for women, working was "incompatible with childbearing"; Mussolini went on to say that the solution to unemployment for men was the "exodus of women from the work force".

The German Nazi government strongly encouraged women to stay at home to bear children and keep house. This policy was reinforced by bestowing the Cross of Honor of the German Mother on women bearing four or more children. The unemployment rate was cut substantially, mostly through arms production and sending women home so that men could take their jobs. Nazi propaganda sometimes promoted premarital and extramarital sexual relations, unwed motherhood and divorce, but at other times the Nazis opposed such behaviour.

The Nazis decriminalized abortion in cases where fetuses had hereditary defects or were of a race the government disapproved of, while the abortion of healthy pure German, Aryan fetuses remained strictly forbidden. For non-Aryans, abortion was often compulsory. Their eugenics program also stemmed from the "progressive biomedical model" of Weimar Germany. In 1935, Nazi Germany expanded the legality of abortion by amending its eugenics law to promote abortion for women with hereditary disorders. The law allowed abortion if a woman gave her permission and the fetus was not yet viable and for purposes of so-called racial hygiene.

The Nazis said that homosexuality was degenerate, effeminate, perverted, and undermined masculinity because it did not produce children. They considered homosexuality curable through therapy, citing modern scientism and the study of sexology. Open homosexuals were interned in Nazi concentration camps.

=== Palingenesis and modernism ===
Fascism emphasizes both palingenesis (national rebirth or re-creation) and modernism. In particular, fascism's nationalism has been identified as having a palingenetic character. Fascism promotes the nation's regeneration and purging it of decadence. Fascism accepts forms of modernism that it deems promote national regeneration while rejecting forms of modernism regarded as antithetical to national regeneration. Fascism aestheticized modern technology and its association with speed, power, and violence. Fascism admired advances in the economy in the early 20th century, particularly Fordism and scientific management. Fascist modernism has been recognized as inspired or developed by various figures—such as Filippo Tommaso Marinetti, Ernst Jünger, Gottfried Benn, Louis-Ferdinand Céline, Knut Hamsun, Ezra Pound and Wyndham Lewis.

In Italy, such modernist influence was exemplified by Marinetti, who advocated a palingenetic modernist society that condemned liberal-bourgeois values of tradition and psychology while promoting a technological-martial religion of national renewal that emphasized militant nationalism. In Germany, it was exemplified by Jünger who was influenced by his observation of the technological warfare during World War I and claimed that a new social class had been created that he described as the "warrior-worker"; Like Marinetti, Jünger emphasized the revolutionary capacities of technology. He emphasized an "organic construction" between humans and machines as a liberating and regenerative force that challenged liberal democracy, conceptions of individual autonomy, bourgeois nihilism, and decadence. He conceived of a society based on a totalitarian concept of "total mobilization" of such disciplined warrior-workers.

== Criticism ==
Fascist parties were closely contested by anti-fascist movements from the political centre and left wing throughout the Interwar period. The defeat of the Axis powers in World War II and subsequent revelation of the crimes against humanity committed during the Holocaust by Germany have led to an almost universal condemnation of both past and present forms of fascism in the modern era. "Fascism" is today used across the political spectrum as a pejorative or byword for perceived authoritarianism and other forms of political evil.

=== Anti-democratic and tyrannical ===
Hitler and Spanish dictator Francisco Franco in the Meeting at Hendaye, on 23 October 1940

One of the most common and strongest criticisms of fascism is that it is a tyranny. Fascism is deliberately and entirely non-democratic and anti-democratic.

Fascism's extreme authoritarianism and nationalism often manifest as a belief in racial purity or a master race, usually blended with some variant of racism or discrimination against a demonized "Other", such as Jews, homosexuals, transgender people, ethnic minorities, or immigrants. These ideas have motivated fascist regimes to commit massacres, forced sterilizations, deportations, and genocides. During World War II, the genocidal and imperialist ambitions of the fascist Axis powers resulted in the murder of millions of people. Federico Finchelstein wrote that fascism

...encompassed totalitarianism, state terrorism, imperialism, racism and, in the German case, the most radical genocide of the last century: the Holocaust. Fascism, in its many forms, did not hesitate to kill its own citizens as well as its colonial subjects in its search for ideological and political closure. Millions of civilians perished on a global scale during the apogee of fascist ideologies in Europe and beyond.

=== Unprincipled opportunism of Mussolini ===
Some critics of Italian fascism have said that much of the ideology was merely a by-product of unprincipled opportunism by Mussolini and that he changed his political stances merely to bolster his personal ambitions while he disguised them as being purposeful to the public. Richard Washburn Child, the American ambassador to Italy who worked with Mussolini and became his friend and admirer, defended Mussolini's opportunistic behaviour by writing:

Opportunist is a term of reproach used to brand men who fit themselves to conditions for the reasons of self-interest. Mussolini, as I have learned to know him, is an opportunist in the sense that he believed that mankind itself must be fitted to changing conditions rather than to fixed theories, no matter how many hopes and prayers have been expended on theories and programmes.

Child quoted Mussolini as saying: "The sanctity of an ism is not in the ism; it has no sanctity beyond its power to do, to work, to succeed in practice. It may have succeeded yesterday and fail to-morrow. Failed yesterday and succeed to-morrow. The machine, first of all, must run!"

Some have criticized Mussolini's actions during the outbreak of World War I as opportunistic for seeming to suddenly abandon Marxist egalitarian internationalism for non-egalitarian nationalism and note, to that effect, that upon Mussolini endorsing Italy's intervention in the war against Germany and Austria-Hungary, he and the new fascist movement received financial support from Italian and foreign sources, such as Ansaldo (an armaments firm) and other companies as well as the British Security Service MI5. Some, including Mussolini's socialist opponents at the time, have noted that regardless of the financial support he accepted for his pro-interventionist stance, Mussolini was free to write whatever he wished in his newspaper Il Popolo d'Italia without prior sanctioning from his financial backers. Furthermore, the major source of financial support that Mussolini and the fascist movement received in World War I was from France and is widely believed to have been French socialists who supported the French government's war against Germany and who sent support to Italian socialists who wanted Italian intervention on France's side.

Mussolini’s transformation away from Marxism into what eventually became fascism began prior to World War I, as Mussolini had grown increasingly pessimistic about Marxism and egalitarianism while becoming increasingly supportive of figures who opposed egalitarianism, such as Friedrich Nietzsche. By 1902, Mussolini was studying Georges Sorel, Nietzsche and Vilfredo Pareto. Sorel's emphasis on the need for overthrowing decadent liberal democracy and capitalism by the use of violence, direct action, general strikes and neo-Machiavellian appeals to emotion impressed Mussolini deeply. Mussolini's use of Nietzsche made him a highly unorthodox socialist, due to Nietzsche's promotion of elitism and anti-egalitarian views. Prior to World War I, Mussolini's writings over time indicated that he had abandoned the Marxism and egalitarianism that he had previously supported in favour of Nietzsche's übermensch concept and anti-egalitarianism. In 1908, Mussolini wrote a short essay called "Philosophy of Strength" based on his Nietzschean influence, in which Mussolini openly spoke fondly of the ramifications of an impending war in Europe in challenging both religion and nihilism: "[A] new kind of free spirit will come, strengthened by the war, ... a spirit equipped with a kind of sublime perversity, ... a new free spirit will triumph over God and over Nothing."

=== Ideological dishonesty ===
Fascism has been criticized for being ideologically dishonest. Major examples of ideological dishonesty have been identified in Italian fascism's changing relationship with German Nazism. Fascist Italy's official foreign policy positions commonly used rhetorical ideological hyperbole to justify its actions, although during Dino Grandi's tenure as Italy's foreign minister the country engaged in realpolitik free of such fascist hyperbole. Italian fascism's stance towards German Nazism fluctuated from support from the late 1920s to 1934, when it celebrated Hitler's rise to power and Mussolini's first meeting with Hitler in 1934; to opposition from 1934 to 1936 after the assassination of Italy's allied leader in Austria, Engelbert Dollfuss, by Austrian Nazis; and again back to support after 1936, when Germany was the only significant power that did not denounce Italy's invasion and occupation of Ethiopia.

After antagonism exploded between Nazi Germany and Fascist Italy over the assassination of Austrian Chancellor Dollfuss in 1934, Mussolini and Italian fascists denounced and ridiculed Nazism's racial theories, particularly by denouncing its Nordicism, while promoting Mediterraneanism. Mussolini himself responded to Nordicists' claims of Italy being divided into Nordic and Mediterranean racial areas due to Germanic invasions of Northern Italy by claiming that while Germanic tribes such as the Lombards took control of Italy after the fall of Ancient Rome, they arrived in small numbers (about 8,000) and quickly assimilated into Roman culture and spoke the Latin language within fifty years. Italian fascism was influenced by the tradition of Italian nationalists scornfully looking down upon Nordicists' claims and taking pride in comparing the age and sophistication of ancient Roman civilization as well as the classical revival in the Renaissance to that of Nordic societies that Italian nationalists described as "newcomers" to civilization in comparison. At the height of antagonism between the Nazis and Italian fascists over race, Mussolini claimed that the Germans themselves were not a pure race and noted with irony that the Nazi theory of German racial superiority was based on the theories of non-German foreigners, such as Frenchman Arthur de Gobineau. After the tension in German-Italian relations diminished during the late 1930s, Italian fascism sought to harmonize its ideology with German Nazism and combined Nordicist and Mediterranean racial theories, noting that Italians were members of the Aryan race, composed of a mixed Nordic-Mediterranean subtype.

In 1938, Mussolini declared upon Italy's adoption of antisemitic laws that Italian fascism had always been antisemitic. However, Italian fascism did not endorse antisemitism until the late 1930s when Mussolini feared alienating antisemitic Nazi Germany, whose power and influence were growing in Europe. Prior to that period, there had been notable Jewish Italians who had been senior Italian fascist officials, including Margherita Sarfatti, who had also been Mussolini's mistress. Also contrary to Mussolini's claim in 1938, only a small number of Italian fascists were staunchly antisemitic (such as Roberto Farinacci and Giuseppe Preziosi), while others such as Italo Balbo, who came from Ferrara, which had one of Italy's largest Jewish communities, were disgusted by the antisemitic laws and opposed them. Fascism scholar Mark Neocleous notes that while Italian fascism did not have a clear commitment to antisemitism, there were occasional antisemitic statements issued prior to 1938, such as Mussolini in 1919 declaring that the Jewish bankers in London and New York were connected by race to the Russian Bolsheviks and that eight percent of the Russian Bolsheviks were Jews.

=== Anti-fascism ===
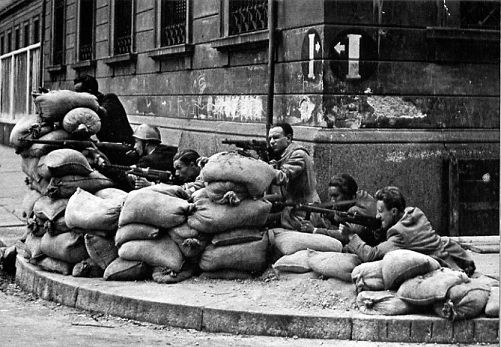
Italian partisans in Milan during the final insurrection leading to the liberation of Italy in April 1945

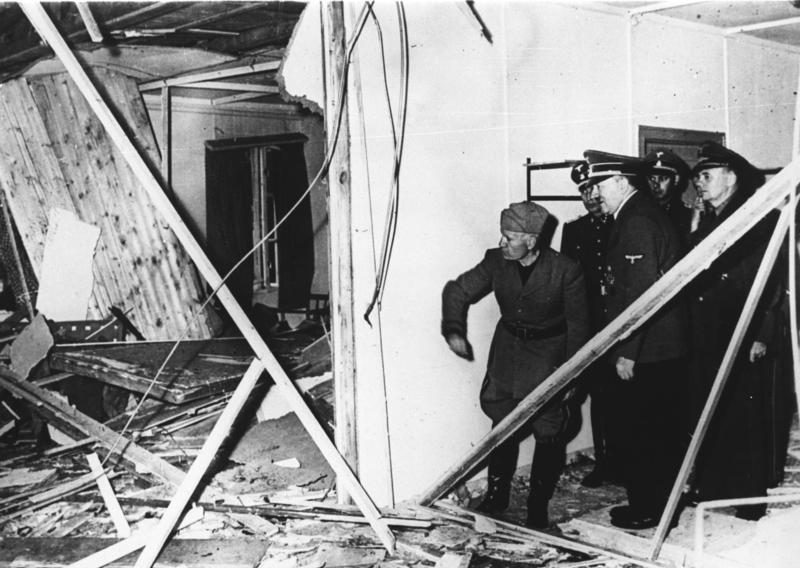
Hitler with Mussolini at the site of the 20 July Plot, an attempted bombing assassination of Hitler by dissident German military officers that took place in 1944.

Anti-fascism is a political movement in opposition to fascist ideologies, groups and individuals. Beginning in European countries in the 1920s, it was at its most significant shortly before and during World War II. During the war, the Axis powers were opposed by many countries forming the Allies, and by dozens of resistance movements worldwide. Anti-fascism has been an element of movements across the political spectrum and holding many different political positions such as anarchism, communism, pacifism, republicanism, social democracy, socialism and syndicalism as well as centrist, conservative, liberal and nationalist viewpoints.

Organization against fascism began around 1920. Fascism became the state ideology of Italy in 1922 and of Germany in 1933, spurring a large increase in anti-fascist action, including German resistance to Nazism and the Italian resistance movement. Anti-fascism was a major aspect of the Spanish Civil War, which foreshadowed World War II.

Before World War II, the West had not taken seriously the threat of fascism, and anti-fascism was sometimes associated with communism. However, the outbreak of World War II greatly changed Western perceptions, and fascism was seen as an existential threat by not only the communist Soviet Union but also by the liberal-democratic United States and United Kingdom. The Axis Powers of World War II were generally fascist, and the fight against them was characterized in anti-fascist terms. Resistance during World War II to fascism occurred in every occupied country, and came from across the ideological spectrum. The defeat of the Axis powers generally ended fascism as a state ideology.

After World War II, the anti-fascist movement continued to be active in places where organized fascism continued or re-emerged. Modern antifa politics in the United States and Britain can be traced to opposition to the infiltration of the American and British punk scenes by white power skinheads in the 1970s and 1980s. From the late 1980s, the squatter scene and autonomism movement in West Germany were important in an upswing of antifa in Germany. There was a further increase in antifascism following the increase in neo-Nazism in Germany after the fall of the Berlin Wall. In the 21st century, this greatly increased in prominence as a response to the resurgence of the radical right, especially after the 2016 election of Donald Trump.

== See also ==
- Anti-fascism – Opposition to fascism
- Authoritarianism – Political system
- Autocracy – Government where an individual holds absolute power
- Criticism of fascism – Criticism of the fascist political ideology
- Dictatorship – Autocratic form of government
- Far-right politics – Political alignment in the right-wing spectrum
- Fascism and ideology – History of fascist ideology
- Fascist culture – Culture associated with fascism
- History of fascism
- Institutional racism – Racial discrimination as a policy within a society or organisation
- Nationalism – Ideology that holds the nation and state should be congruent
- Right-wing politics – Political ideologies favouring social orders
- Totalitarianism – Extreme form of authoritarianism and a theoretical concept
- Ultranationalism – Extreme form of nationalism

== Bibliography ==
=== Primary sources ===
- Hoover, Calvin B. (March 1935). "The Paths of Economic Change: Contrasting Tendencies in the Modern World". The American Economic Review. 25 (1): 13–20.. Supplement, Papers and Proceedings of the Forty-Seventh Annual Meeting of the American Economic Association.
- Hoover, J. Edgar (1947). "Testimony before the House Un-American Activities Committee". Archived from the original on 23 July 2010.
- Mussolini, Benito (2006) [1928]. My Autobiography with The Political and Social Doctrine of Fascism. Mineloa, NY: Dover Publications. ISBN 978-0-486-44777-3.
- Mussolini, Benito (2002) [1934]. Gregor, Anthony James (ed.). Origins and Doctrine of Fascism. New Brunswick (US); London: Transaction Publishers. ISBN 978-0-7658-0130-2.
- Mussolini, Benito (1935). Fascism: Doctrine and Institutions. Rome: Ardita Publishers.
- Mussolini, Benito (1998). My Rise And Fall. Da Capo Press. ISBN 978-0-306-80864-7.
- Orwell, George (29 December 2019) [26 March 1944]. "What is Fascism?". Tribune., republished in The Collected Essays, Journalism and Letters of George Orwell. 1968.

=== Secondary sources ===
- Acemoğlu, Daron; De Feo, Giuseppe; De Luca, Giacomo; Russo, Gianluca (28 October 2020). "Revisiting the rise of Italian fascism". Center for Economic and Policy Research. Archived from the original on 14 August 2021.
- Adler, Les K.; Paterson, Thomas G. (April 1970). "Red Fascism: The Merger of Nazi Germany and Soviet Russia in the American Image of Totalitarianism, 1930's–1950's". The American Historical Review. 75 (4): 1046–1064. doi:10.2307/1852269. JSTOR 1852269.
- Ahmida, Ali Abdullatif (1994). The Making of Modern Libya: State Formation, Colonization, and Resistance, 1830–1922. Albany, New York: State University of New York Press.
- Alpert, Michael (2019). Franco and the Condor Legion: The Spanish Civil War in the Air. Bloomsbury Publishing. ISBN 978-1-78673-563-8.
- Amann, Peter H. (1986). "A 'Dog in the Nighttime' Problem: American Fascism in the 1930s". The History Teacher. 19 (4): 559–584. doi:10.2307/493879. ISSN 0018-2745. JSTOR 493879.
- Antliff, Mark (2007). Avant-Garde Fascism: The Mobilization of Myth, Art, and Culture in France, 1909–1939. Duke University Press.
- Arnot, Margaret; Usborne, Cornelie (1999). Gender and Crime in Modern Europe. New York: Routledge. ISBN 978-1-85728-745-5. OCLC 249726924.
- Baker, David (June 2006). "The political economy of fascism: Myth or reality, or myth and reality?". New Political Economy. 11 (2): 227–250. doi:10.1080/13563460600655581. S2CID 155046186.
- Balhorn, Loren (15 August 2017). "The Lost History of Antifa". Jacobin. Archived from the original on 14 April 2025.
- Baranski, Zygmunt G.; West, Rebecca J. (2001). The Cambridge Companion to Modern Italian Culture. Cambridge University Press. ISBN 978-0-521-55982-9 – via Google Books.
- Bar On, Bat-Ami (7 January 2020). "But Is It Fascism?". Journal of Social Philosophy. 50 (4). Wiley: 407–424. doi:10.1111/josp.12322.
- Bastow, Steve; Martin, James (2003). Third Way Discourse: European Ideologies in the Twentieth Century. Edinburgh University Press.
- Beauchamp, Zack (8 June 2020). "Antifa, explained". Vox. Archived from the original on 6 May 2025.
- Beinart, Peter (6 August 2017). "The Rise of the Violent Left". The Atlantic. Archived from the original on 6 May 2025.
- Benewick, Robert (1972). The Fascist Movement in Britain (Revised ed.). London: Allen Lane. ISBN 0713903414. S2CID 159244065.
- Berend, Iván T. (2016). An Economic History of Twentieth-Century Europe: Economic Regimes from Laissez-Faire to Globalization. Cambridge University Press.
- Berger, Ronald J. (2025). "Fascism, American Style: Toward a Sociology of the Fascist Moment". Sociological Focus. 58 (2): 177–194. doi:10.1080/00380237.2025.2466003.
- Berghaus, Günter (2000). Fascism and Theatre: Comparative Studies on the Aesthetics and Politics of Performance. Berkeley and Los Angeles, CA: University of California Press.
- Bianchi, Gianfranco (1963). 25 Luglio: crollo di un regime [July 25: Collapse of a Regime] (in Italian). Milano: Mursia.
- Blinkhorn, Martin (2003). Fascists and Conservatives: The Radical Right and the Establishment in Twentieth-Century Europe. Routledge. ISBN 978-1-134-99712-1 – via Google Books.
- Blinkhorn, Martin (2006). Mussolini and Fascist Italy (3rd ed.). New York: Routledge. ISBN 978-1-134-50572-2 – via Google Books.
- Bloxham, Donald; Moses, A. Dirk (2010). Bloxham, Donald; Moses, A. Dirk (eds.). The Oxford Handbook of Genocide Studies. Oxford, England: Oxford University Press. doi:10.1093/oxfordhb/9780199232116.001.0001. ISBN 9780199232116.
- Bollas, Christopher (1993). Being a Character: Psychoanalysis and Self-Experience. Routledge. ISBN 978-0-415-08815-2.
- Boesche, Roger (2010). Theories of Tyranny: From Plato to Arendt. Penn State Press. ISBN 978-0-271-04405-7 – via Google Books.
- Bogel-Burroughs, Nicholas; Garcia, Sandra E. (28 September 2020). "What Is Antifa, the Movement Trump Wants to Declare a Terror Group?". The New York Times. ISSN 0362-4331. Archived from the original on 5 April 2025.
- Borsella, Cristogianni; Caso, Adolph (2007). Fascist Italy: A Concise Historical Narrative. Wellesley, Massachusetts: Branden Books. ISBN 978-0828321556.
- Brennan, T. Corey (2022). The fasces: a history of ancient Rome's most dangerous political symbol. Oxford University Press. ISBN 978-0-19-764488-1.
- Brennan, T. Corey (16 July 2023). "The Fasces: Ancient Rome's Most Dangerous Political Symbol". Antigone Journal. Archived from the original on 20 March 2025.
- Breuilly, John (1994). Nationalism and the State. University of Chicago Press.
- Burgwyn, H. James (1997). Italian Foreign Policy in the Interwar Period, 1918–1940. Greenwood Publishing Group. ISBN 978-0275948771.
- Camus, Jean-Yves; Lebourg, Nicolas (20 March 2017). Far-Right Politics in Europe. Harvard University Press. ISBN 978-0-674-97153-0 – via Google Books.
- Cardoza, Anthony L. (2006). Benito Mussolini: the First Fascist. Pearson Longman.
- Carroll, David (1998). French Literary Fascism: Nationalism, Anti-Semitism, and the Ideology of Culture. Princeton University Press. ISBN 978-0-691-05846-7 – via Google Books.
- Cecchi de Rossi, Martina (20 December 2012). "Dal Centrodestra nazionale ai Fratelli d'Italia: Giorgia Meloni e Guido Crosetto vicini a Ignazio La Russa" [From the National Center-Right to the Brothers of Italy: Giorgia Meloni and Guido Crosetto are close to Ignazio La Russa.]. HuffPost (in Italian). Archived from the original on 4 December 2024.
- Cesarani, David (2016). Final Solution: The Fate of the Jews 1933–1949. St. Martin's Press. ISBN 978-0-230-76891-8.
- Chomsky, Noam (2003). Hegemony or survival: America's quest for global dominance. Henry Holt and Company. ISBN 0-8050-7400-7.
- Clarke, Paul Barry; Foweraker, Joe (2001). Encyclopedia of Democratic Thought. Routledge.
- Coalson, Robert (9 April 2022). "Nasty, Repressive, Aggressive – Yes. But Is Russia Fascist? Experts Say 'No.'". Radio Free Europe/Radio Liberty. Archived from the original on 23 July 2023.
- Conway III, Lucian Gideon; Zubrod, Alivia; Chan, Linus; McFarland, James D.; Van de Vliert, Evert (8 February 2023). "Is the myth of left-wing authoritarianism itself a myth?". Frontiers in Psychology. 13 1041391. doi:10.3389/fpsyg.2022.1041391. ISSN 1664-1078. PMC 9944136. PMID 36846476.
- Copsey, Nigel (2008). Contemporary British Fascism: The British National Party and the Quest for Legitimacy (second ed.). London and New York: Routledge. ISBN 978-0-230-57437-3.
- ——— (2023). "Afterword: "Are you a communist? No, I am an anti-fascist."". In Pirjevec, Jože; Pelikan, Egon; Ramet, Sabrina P. (eds.). Anti-Fascism in European History: From the 1920s to Today. Central European University Press. pp. 269–280. ISBN 978-963-386-658-0.
- Corner, Paul (2012). The Fascist Party and Popular Opinion in Mussolini's Italy. Oxford, England, UK: Oxford University Press. ISBN 9780191741753.
- Corni, Gustavo (26 August 2015). "Fascism and the Radical Right". International Encyclopedia of the First World War. Archived from the original on 1 April 2025.
- Corvaja, Santi; Miller, Robert L. (2008). Hitler & Mussolini: The Secret Meetings. New York: Enigma Books. ISBN 9781929631421.
- Cruz, Gabriel A.; Sawyer, Patrick (2021). "A Safe Space for the White Race: An Interrogation of White Nationalist Propaganda on College Campuses". In Jovanovic, Spoma (ed.). Expression in Contested Public Spaces: Free Speech and Civic Engagement. Lexington Books. ISBN 978-1-7936-3094-0.
- Cucchetti, Humberto (2012). "Lecturas e interpretaciones sobre los orígenes del peronismo: ¿nacional-populismo o adaptación fascista?" [Readings and interpretations on the origins of Peronism: national-populism or fascist adaptation?]. Studia Historica. Contemporary History (in Spanish). 30. Universidad de Salamanca: 151–171. ISSN 0213-2087. Archived from the original on 10 March 2025.
- Davidson, Eugene (2004). The Unmaking of Adolf Hitler. Columbia, Missouri: University of Missouri Press.
- Davies, Peter; Lynch, Derek, eds. (2002). The Routledge Companion to Fascism and the Far Right. Routledge. ISBN 978-1-134-60952-9 – via Google Books.
- De Felice, Renzo (1996). Mussolini. L'Alleato. 1: L'Italia in guerra II: Crisi e agonia del regime [Mussolini. The Ally. 1: Italy at War II: The Crisis and Agony of the Regime] (in Italian) (2nd ed.). Torino: Einaudi. ISBN 8-8061-9569-7.
- De Grand, Alexander J. (1995). Fascist Italy and Nazi Germany.
- ——— (2000). Italian Fascism: its Origins and Development (3rd ed.). University of Nebraska Press.
- Deletant, D. (2006). Hitler's Forgotten Ally: Ion Antonescu and his Regime, Romania 1940–1944. Springer. ISBN 9780230502093 – via Google Books.
- Delzel, Charles F., ed. (1970). Mediterranean Fascism 1919–1945. Harper Rowe.
- Deutsch, Sandra McGee (2009). "Fascism, Neo-Fascism, or Post-Fascism? Chile, 1945–1988". Diálogos-Revista do Departamento de História e do Programa de Pós-Graduação Em História. 13 (1): 19–44.
- Durham, Martin (25 June 1998). Women and Fascism. Routledge. ISBN 978-0415122801.
- Early, John, ed. (16 May 2018). "3 Militia Groups Connected to Unite the Right Rally Settle Lawsuits". nbc29.com. WVIR-TV. Archived from the original on 14 February 2019.
- Eatwell, Roger (1996). Fascism: A History. New York: Allen Lane. ISBN 978-0-7139-9147-5.
- Eco, Umberto (22 June 1995). "Eternal Fascism" – via The Anarchist Library.
- Elazar, Dahlia S. (2001). The Making of Fascism: Class, State, and Counter-Revolution, Italy 1919–1922. Westport, Connecticut: Praeger Publishers.
- Eley, Geoff (2013). Nazism as Fascism: Violence, Ideology, and the Ground of Consent in Germany 1930–1945. London and New York: Routledge. ISBN 978-0-203-69430-5.
- Evans, Richard J. (2005). The Third Reich in Power: 1933–1939. The Penguin Press HC. ISBN 1-59420-074-2.
- Evans, Richard J. (2008). The Third Reich at War. New York: Penguin. ISBN 978-0-14-311671-4.
- Falasca-Zamponi, Simonetta (2000). Fascist Spectacle: The Aesthetics of Power in Mussolini's Italy. Oakland, California: University of California Press. ISBN 978-0-520-22677-7.
- Ferrandi, Maurizio; Obermair, Hannes (2023). Camicie nere in Alto Adige (1921–1928) [Blackshirts in South Tyrol (1921–1928)] (in Italian). Merano: Alphabeta. ISBN 978-88-7223-419-8.
- Finchelstein, Federico (20 August 2008). "On Fascist Ideology". Constellations. 15 (3). Wiley: 320–331. doi:10.1111/j.1467-8675.2008.00494.x. ISSN 1351-0487.
- ——— (2010). Transatlantic Fascism: Ideology, Violence, and the Sacred in Argentina and Italy, 1919-1945. Duke University Press. doi:10.1515/9780822391555. ISBN 978-0-8223-9155-5.
- Friedlander, Henry (1995). The origins of Nazi genocide: from euthanasia to the final solution. Chapel Hill, North Carolina: University of North Carolina Press. ISBN 978-0-8078-4675-9. OCLC 60191622.
- Friedman, Jonathan C. (2011). The Routledge History of the Holocaust. Routledge.
- Galasso, Norberto (2003). "Peronismo y Liberación Nacional" [Peronism and National Liberation]. Apuntes para otra historia [Notes for another story] (in Spanish). ISSN 1667-1635.
- Gallagher, Tom (2005). Theft of a Nation: Romania Since Communism. C. Hurst & Co. Publishers. ISBN 9781850657163 – via Google Books.
- Gallo, Max (1974). Spain under Franco: A History. Translated by Stewart, Sean. E. P. Dutton & Company. ISBN 0-525-20750-3.
- García, Hugo (November 2016). "Transnational History: A New Paradigm for Anti-Fascist Studies?". Contemporary European History. 25 (4): 563–572. doi:10.1017/S0960777316000382. ISSN 0960-7773.
- Gentile, Emilio (2002). Fascismo: Storia e interpretazione [Fascism: History and interpretation] (in Italian). Editori Laterza. ISBN 978-88-581-0916-8 – via Google Books.
- Gentile, Emilio (2003). The Struggle for Modernity: Nationalism, Futurism, and Fascism. Westport, Connecticut: Praeger Publishers.
- Gentile, Emilio (2005). The Origins of Fascist Ideology, 1918–1925: The First Complete Study of the Origins of Italian Fascism. New York: Enigma Books. ISBN 978-1-929631-18-6.
- Giaccaria, Paolo; Minca, Claudio, eds. (2016). Hitler's Geographies: The Spatialities of the Third Reich. Chicago: University of Chicago Press. ISBN 978-0-226-27442-3.
- Gillette, Aaron (2001). Racial Theories in Fascist Italy. London; New York: Routledge.
- Giuffrida, Angela (12 June 2023). "Berlusconi's death poses challenge for his party and for Meloni". The Guardian. Archived from the original on 15 January 2024.
- Goldstein, Erik; Lukes, Igor (1999). The Munich Crisis, 1938: Prelude to World War II. New York. ISBN 9781136328398.
- Golomb, Jacob; Wistrich, Robert S. (2002). Nietzsche, Godfather of Fascism? On the Uses and Abuses of a Philosophy. Princeton, New Jersey: Princeton University Press.
- Goodwin, Matthew J. (2011). New British Fascism: Rise of the British National Party. London and New York: Routledge. ISBN 978-0-415-46500-7.
- Gori, Gigliola (2004). Italian Fascism and the Female Body: Submissive Women and Strong Mothers. Oxfordshire; New York: Routledge.
- Grandi, Dino (1983). De Felice, Renzo (ed.). Il 25 Luglio 40 anni dopo [July 25th 40 years later] (in Italian) (3rd ed.). Bologna: Il Mulino. ISBN 8-8150-0331-2.
- Grant, Moyra (2003). Key Ideas in Politics. Nelson Thornes. ISBN 978-0-7487-7096-0 – via Google Books.
- Grčić, Joseph (2000). Ethics and Political Theory. Lanham, Maryland: University of America, Inc.
- Gregor, Anthony James (April 1974). "Fascism and Modernization: Some Addenda". World Politics. 26 (3). Johns Hopkins University Press: 370–384. doi:10.2307/2009935. JSTOR 2009935.
- ——— (1979). Young Mussolini and the Intellectual Origins of Fascism. Berkeley and Los Angeles, California; London: University of California Press. ISBN 978-0-520-03799-1.
- ——— (2005). Mussolini's Intellectuals: Fascist Social and Political Thought. Princeton University Press. ISBN 978-0-691-12009-6.
- ——— (2009). Phoenix: Fascism in Our Time. New Brunswick: Transaction Press.
- Griffin, Roger (1991). The Nature of Fascism. Palgrave Macmillan. ISBN 978-0-312-07132-5 – via Google Books.
- ——— (1995). Fascism. Oxford, England: Oxford University Press.
- ——— (1996). "Staging the Nation's Rebirth: The Politics and Aesthetics of Performance in the Context of Fascist Studies". In Berghaus, Günter (ed.). Fascism and theater: comparative studies on the aesthetics and politics of performance in Europe, 1925–1945. Providence, RI: Berghahn Books. pp. 11–29. ISBN 978-1571819017 – via Library of Social Science.
- ——— (2003). "The palingenetic core of generic fascist ideology". In Campi, Alessandro (ed.). Che cos'è il fascismo? Interpretazioni e prospettive di ricerche [What is fascism? Interpretations and research perspectives] (PDF) (in Italian). Rome: Ideazione editrice. pp. 97–122. Archived from the original (PDF) on 29 July 2004.
- Griffin, Roger; Feldman, Matthew, eds. (2004). Fascism: Critical Concepts in Political Science. Taylor & Francis.
  - ———; ———, eds. (2004a). The nature of fascism. Vol. 1. Taylor & Francis.
  - ———; ———, eds. (2004c). Fascism and Culture. Vol. 3. London and New York: Routledge.
- Griffin, Roger (2008). Feldman, Matthew (ed.). A Fascist Century. London: Palgrave Macmillan. ISBN 978-0-230-20518-5. OCLC 226357121.
- Griffin, Roger (2013). Fascism, Totalitarianism and Political Religion. Routledge. ISBN 978-1-136-87168-9 – via Google Books.
- Griffiths, Richard (2000). An Intelligent Person's Guide to Fascism. Duckworth. ISBN 978-0-7156-2918-5 – via Internet Archive.
- Gunter, Joel (13 August 2017). "A reckoning in Charlottesville". BBC News. Archived from the original on 5 May 2019.
- Haider, Asad (2021). "Authoritarianism and Ideology". CLCWeb: Comparative Literature and Culture. 23 (1): 1–9. doi:10.7771/1481-4374.4011.
- Hartley, John (2004). Communication, Cultural and Media Studies: The Key Concepts (3rd ed.). Routledge. ISBN 978-0-521-55982-9.
- Hawkins, Mike (1997). Social Darwinism in European and American Thought, 1860–1945: Nature as Model and Nature as Threat. Cambridge: Cambridge University Press.
- Hehn, Paul N. (2005). A Low Dishonest Decade: The Great Powers, Eastern Europe, and the Economic Origins of World War II, 1930–1941. Continuum International Publishing Group. ISBN 0826417612.
- Heineman, Elizabeth D. (2002). "Sexuality and Nazism: The Doubly Unspeakable?". Journal of the History of Sexuality. 11 (1/2): 22–66. doi:10.1353/sex.2002.0006. ISSN 1043-4070. JSTOR 3704551. S2CID 142085835.
- Hirsch, Francine (2020). Soviet Judgment at Nuremberg: A New History of the International Military Tribunal after World War II. Oxford University Press. ISBN 978-0-19-937795-4.
- Ignazi, Piero (2003). Extreme Right Parties in Western Europe. Oxford University Press. doi:10.1093/0198293259.001.0001. ISBN 9780198293255.
- Jablonsky, David (1989). The Nazi Party in dissolution: Hitler and the Verbotzeit, 1923–1925. London; Totowa, NJ: Frank Cass and Company Ltd.
- Jackson, Paul (2023). "Paramilitarism in Fascism and the Radical Right: The Sixth Convention of the International Association of Comparative Fascist Studies (COMFAS)". Fascism. 12 (2): 333–335. doi:10.1163/22116257-bja10065.
- Johnston, Peter (12 April 2013). "The Rule of Law: Symbols of Power". The Keating Center, Oklahoma Wesleyan University. Archived from the original on 30 March 2017.
- Kallis, Aristotle A. (2000). Fascist ideology: territory and expansionism in Italy and Germany, 1922–1945. London: Routledge. ISBN 978-0-415-21612-8 – via Google Books.
- ———, ed. (2003b). The Fascism Reader. London: Routledge.
- ——— (2009). Genocide and Fascism: The Eliminationist Drive in Fascist Europe. London: Routledge. ISBN 978-0-203-44936-3.
- ——— (2011). Genocide and Fascism: The Eliminationist Drive in Fascist Europe. Routledge. ISBN 978-0-415-89027-4.
- ——— (19 October 2020). "'Counter-spurt' but not 'de-civilization': fascism, (un)civility, taboo, and the 'civilizing process'". Journal of Political Ideologies. 26 (1): 3–22. doi:10.1080/13569317.2020.1825278.
- Kedar, Asaf (2010). National Socialism Before Nazism: Friedrich Naumann and Theodor Fritsch, 1890-1914 (PDF) (PhD). University of California, Berkeley. Archived from the original (PDF) on 27 November 2022.
- Kelkar, Kamala (12 August 2017). "Three dead after white nationalist rally in Charlottesville". PBS NewsHour. Archived from the original on 14 May 2018.
- Kershaw, Ian (2000). Hitler, 1889–1936: Hubris. New York; London: W. W. Norton & Company.
- ——— (2008). Hitler: A Biography. New York: W. W. Norton & Company. ISBN 978-0-393-06757-6.
- ——— (2016). To Hell and Back: Europe 1914–1949. New York: Penguin Books. ISBN 978-0-14-310992-1.
- Kington, Tom (13 October 2009). "Recruited by MI5: the name's Mussolini. Benito Mussolini – Documents reveal Italian dictator got start in politics in 1917 with help of £100 weekly wage from MI5". The Guardian. UK. Archived from the original on 19 May 2019.
- Kitchen, Martin (2006). A History of Modern Germany, 1800–2000. Malden, Massaschussetts; Oxford, England; Carlton, Victoria, Australia: Blackwell Publishing, Inc.
- Knaur, Peter (1951). The International Relations of Austria and the Anschluss 1931–1938. University of Wyoming.
- Kochanski, Halik (2012). The Eagle Unbowed: Poland and the Poles in the Second World War. Harvard University Press. ISBN 978-0674284005.
- Lancaster, Guy (26 September 2011). "Genocide and Fascism: The Eliminationist Drive in Fascist Europe". Journal of Genocide Research. 13 (3): 366–369. doi:10.1080/14623528.2011.595586. S2CID 72839243.
- Laqueur, Walter (1978). Fascism: A Reader's Guide: Analyses, Interpretations, Bibliography. University of California Press. ISBN 978-0-520-03642-0 – via Google Books.
- Laqueur, Walter (1997). Fascism: Past, Present, Future. Oxford: Oxford University Press. ISBN 978-0-19-802527-6 – via Google Books.
- Larsen, Stein Ugelvik; Hagtvet, Bernt; Myklebust, Jan Petter, eds. (1984). Who Were the Fascists: Social Roots of European Fascism. Columbia University Press. ISBN 978-82-00-05331-6.
- Larsen, Stein Ugelvik, ed. (2001). Fascism Outside of Europe. New York: Columbia University Press.
- Laruelle, Marlene (2021). Is Russia Fascist?: Unravelling Propaganda East and West. Cornell University Press. ISBN 9781501754135. JSTOR 10.7591/j.ctv16t673d.
- Laruelle, Marlene (2022). "So, Is Russia Fascist Now? Labels and Policy Implications" (PDF). The Washington Quarterly. 45 (2): 149–168. doi:10.1080/0163660X.2022.2090760. S2CID 250566287. Archived (PDF) from the original on 20 July 2022.
- Lim, Jie-Hyun (2012). "Mass Dictatorship – A Transnational Formation of Modernity". Moving the Social. 47: 63–82. doi:10.13154/mts.47.2012.63-81.
- Lorenz, David Alegre (2023). "The New Fascist Man in the 1930s Spain". In Dagnino, Jorge; Feldman, Matthew; Stocker, Paul (eds.). The "New Man" in Radical Right Ideology and Practice, 1919-45. Bloomsbury Publishing. pp. 215–230. ISBN 9781474281119.
- Lowe, Kieth (2014). "European Fascism and its aftermath". In Vertovec, Steven (ed.). Routledge International Handbook of Diversity Studies. Routledge. pp. 159–166. doi:10.4324/9781315747224.CH17 (inactive 1 July 2025). ISBN 9781315747224.
- Lukacs, John (1998). The Hitler of History. New York: Vintage Books. ISBN 978-0-375-70113-9.
- Luža, Radomír (21 September 1975). Austro-German Relations in the Anschluss Era. Princeton University Press. ISBN 978-0-6910-7568-6.
- Lyttelton, Adrian (1973). Italian Fascisms: from Pareto to Gentile. London: Cape.
- Mack Smith, Denis (1983). Mussolini. New York: Vintage Books.
- ——— (1997). Modern Italy: A Political History. Ann Arbor: The University of Michigan Press.
- Marhoefer, Laurie; The Conversation (21 September 2023). "New Research Reveals How the Nazis Targeted Transgender People". Smithsonian. Archived from the original on 15 January 2025.
- McLaren, Angus (1999). Twentieth-Century Sexuality. Blackwell Publishing.
- Mann, Michael (2004). Fascists. Cambridge, England: Cambridge University Press. ISBN 978-0-521-83131-4.
- McDonald, Harmish (1999). Mussolini and Italian Fascism. Nelson Thornes.
- Michael, Savvas (30 September 2013). "The Arrest of the Nazi Gangsters of Golden Dawn in Greece". EEK. Archived from the original on 13 June 2020.
- Millett, Allan R.; Murray, Williamson (2010). Military Effectiveness. Vol. 2 (New ed.). New York: Cambridge University Press. ISBN 978-0521737500.
- Millward, Robert (2007). Private and Public Enterprise in Europe: Energy, Telecommunications and Transport, 1830–1990. Cambridge University Press. ISBN 978-0-521-83524-4 – via Google Books.
- Morgan, Philip (1995). Italian fascism, 1919–1945. The making of the 20th century. Basingstoke, Hampshire: Macmillan Inc. ISBN 978-0-333-53779-4.
- ——— (2003). Fascism in Europe, 1919–1945. London: Routledge. ISBN 978-1-134-74028-4 – via Google Books.
- Motyl, Alexander J. (March 2016). "Putin's Russia as a fascist political system". Communist and Post-Communist Studies. 49 (1): 25–36. doi:10.1016/j.postcomstud.2016.01.002. ISSN 0967-067X. JSTOR 48610431.
- ——— (30 March 2022). "Yes, Putin and Russia are fascist. How they meet the textbook definition". The Conversation. Archived from the original on 3 March 2025.
- Mudde, Cas; Kaltwasser, Cristóbal Rovira (2017). Populism: A Very Short Introduction. Oxford, England: Oxford University Press. ISBN 978-0-19-023487-4.
- Mussolini, Rachele (1977). Mussolini: An Intimate Biography. New York: Pocket Books. Originally published by William Morrow in 1974.
- Nelson, Walter (1967). Small Wonder. Little, Brown & Company.
- Neocleous, Mark (1997). Fascism. Minneapolis, MN: Minnesota University Press.
- Neville, Peter (2004). Mussolini. Oxon, England; New York: Routledge.
- Niewyk, Donald L.; Nicosia, Francis R. (2000). The Columbia Guide to the Holocaust. Columbia University Press. ISBN 978-0-231-52878-8.
- Nolte, Ernst (1965). The Three Faces of Fascism: Action Française, Italian Fascism, National Socialism. Translated by Vennewitz, Leila. London: Weidenfeld & Nicolson.
- O'Brien, Paul (2014). Mussolini in the First World War: The Journalist, the Soldier, the Fascist. Bloomsbury Publishing. ISBN 978-1-84520-558-4 – via Google Books.
- Olechnowicz, Andrzej (2005). "Liberal anti-fascism in the 1930s the case of Sir Ernest Barker". Albion. 36 (4): 636–660. doi:10.2307/4054585. JSTOR 4054585. Archived from the original on 12 March 2025.
- Overy, Richard J. (1994). War and Economy in the Third Reich. Clarendon Press (Oxford University Press). doi:10.1093/acprof:oso/9780198202905.001.0001. ISBN 9780198202905.
- ——— (2005). The Dictators: Hitler's Germany, Stalin's Russia. Penguin. ISBN 978-0140281491.
- Page, Joseph A. (2014). Perón: A biography. Penguin Random House Grupo Editorial Argentina. ISBN 9789500748247.
- Pareene, Alex; Marsh, Laura (29 March 2023). "Who Are You Calling a Fascist?". The New Republic. ISSN 0028-6583. Archived from the original on 29 March 2023.
- Park, Madison (12 August 2017). "Why white nationalists are drawn to Charlottesville". CNN.
- Passmore, Kevin (2002). Fascism: A Very Short Introduction. Oxford: Oxford University Press. ISBN 978-1-5366-6507-9.
- ——— (2003). Women, Gender, and Fascism in Europe, 1919–45. Manchester University Press. ISBN 978-0-7190-6617-7 – via Google Books.
- Pauley, Bruce F. (2003). Hitler, Stalin, and Mussolini: Totalitarianism in the Twentieth Century Italy. Wheeling: Harlan Davidson, Inc.
- Paxton, Robert O. (1998). "The five stages of fascism". Journal of Modern History. 70 (1): 1–23. doi:10.1086/235001. JSTOR 10.1086/235001. S2CID 143862302.
- Paxton, Robert O. (2004). The Anatomy of Fascism (First ed.). New York: Alfred A. Knopf. ISBN 978-1-4000-4094-0.
  - Paxton, Robert O. (2005). The Anatomy of Fascism. New York; Toronto: Random House. ISBN 978-0-307-42812-7.
- Payne, Stanley G. (1973). "25". A History of Spain and Portugal. Vol. 2 (Print ed.). University of Wisconsin Press. Archived from the original on 4 March 2025 – via Library of Iberian Resources Online.
- ——— (1980). Fascism: Comparison and Definition. University of Wisconsin Press. ISBN 978-0-299-08060-0.
- ——— (1992). "Fascism". In Hawkesworth, Mary; Kogan, Maurice (eds.). Encyclopaedia of Government and Politics. Vol. 1. Routledge. pp. 167–178. ISBN 978-0-203-71288-7.
- ——— (1975). "Spanish Fascism in Comparative Perspective". In Turner, Henry Ashby (ed.). Reappraisals of Fascism. New Viewpoints. pp. 142–169. ISBN 978-0531053720.
- ——— (1995). A History of Fascism, 1914–45. Madison, WI: University of Wisconsin Press. ISBN 978-0-299-14874-4. online; also another copy.
- Payne, Stanley G.; Palacios, Jesús (2014). Franco: A Personal and Political Biography (4th ed.). University of Wisconsin Press. ISBN 978-0299302146.
- Peck, Abraham J.; Berenbaum, Michael, eds. (2002). The Holocaust and History: The Known, the Unknown, the Disputed, and the Reexamined. Indiana University Press. ISBN 978-0-253-21529-1.
- Pollard, John (1998). The Fascist Experience in Italy. Routledge. ISBN 978-0415116329.
- Porat, Dina; Stauber, Roni (2002). Antisemitism Worldwide 2000/1. University of Nebraska Press.
- Proctor, Robert E. (1989). Racial Hygiene: Medicine Under the Nazis. Cambridge, Massachusetts: Harvard University Press. ISBN 978-0-674-74578-0. OCLC 20760638.
- Quarantotto, Claudio (1976). Tutti fascisti! [All fascists!] (in Italian). Edizioni del Borghese – via Google Books.
- Quine, Maria Sophia (1996). Population Politics in Twentieth-century Europe: Fascist Dictatorships and Liberal Democracies. Routledge. ISBN 978-0-415-08069-9 – via Google Books.
- Ramswell, Prebble Q. (2017). Euroscepticism and the Rising Threat from the Left and Right: The Concept of Millennial Fascism. Lexington Books. ISBN 978-1-4985-4604-1 – via Google Books.
- Reich, Wilhelm (1970). The Mass Psychology of Fascism. HarperCollins. ISBN 978-0-285-64701-5.
- Rein, Raanan (2015). Los muchachos judíos peronistas: Judeosargentinos y apoyo al Justicialismo [The Peronist Jewish Boys: Judeo-sergeants and support for Justicialism] (in Spanish). Penguin Random House Grupo Editorial Argentina. ISBN 9789500753982.
- Renton, David (1999). Fascism: Theory and Practice. London: Pluto Press.
- Richardson, John E. (2017). British Fascism: A Discourse-Historical Analysis. Stuttgart: Ibidem Press. ISBN 978-3-8382-6491-2.
- Rieber, Alfred J. (2017). "Anti-Fascist Resistance Movements in Europe and Asia During World War II". In Naimark, Norman; Pons, Silvio; Quinn-Judge, Sophie (eds.). The Cambridge History of Communism. Vol. 2: The Socialist Camp and World Power 1941–1960s. Cambridge University Press. pp. 38–62. doi:10.1017/9781316459850. ISBN 9781316459850.
- Rietbergen, P. J. A. N. (2000). A Short History of the Netherlands: From Prehistory to the Present Day (4th ed.). Amersfoort: Bekking. ISBN 90-6109-440-2. OCLC 52849131.
- Rodogno, Davide (2006). Fascism's European empire. Cambridge, England: Cambridge University Press.
- Roel Reyes, Stefan (17 December 2019). "Antebellum Palingenetic Ultranationalism: The Case for including the United States in Comparative Fascist Studies". Fascism. 8 (2). Leiden, Netherlands: Brill: 307–330. doi:10.1163/22116257-00802005. ISSN 2211-6257.
- ——— (24 November 2021). "'Christian Patriots': The Intersection Between Proto-fascism and Clerical Fascism in the Antebellum South". International Journal for History, Culture and Modernity. -1 (aop): 82–110. doi:10.1163/22130624-00219121. ISSN 2213-0624. S2CID 244746966.
- Romero, Ricardo (2015), Perón, Reformismo y nazi fascismo durante la Segunda Guerra Mundial [Perón, Reformism and Nazi fascism during the Second War World] (in Spanish), Departamento de Ciencias Sociales, Colegio nacional de Buenos Aires, UBA, archived from the original on 7 April 2016
- Ross, Alexander Reid (2017). Against the Fascist Creep. Chico, California: AK Press. ISBN 978-1-84935-244-4.
- Samaras, Georgios (26 November 2020). "The end of Golden Dawn: has Greece shown us how to deal with neo-Nazis?". The Conversation. Archived from the original on 2 December 2020.
- Schnapp, Jeffrey Thompson; Sears, Olivia E.; Stampino, Maria G. (2000). A Primer of Italian Fascism. University of Nebraska Press.
- Schori Liang, Christina (2013). "'Nationalism Ensures Peaces': the Foreign and Security Policy of the German Populist Radical Left After Reunification". Europe for the Europeans: The Foreign and Security Policy of the Populist Radical Right. Ashgate Publishing. ISBN 978-1-4094-9825-4. Archived from the original on 15 May 2019.
- Schreiber, Gerhard; Stegemann, Bernd; Vogel, Detlef (1995). Germany and the Second World War: Volume III: The Mediterranean, South-East Europe, and North Africa 1939–1941 (From Italy's Declaration of Non-Belligerence to the Entry of the United States into the War). Oxford University Press.
- Seidman, Michael (2017). Transatlantic Antifascisms: From the Spanish Civil War to the End of World War II. Cambridge University Press. doi:10.1017/CBO9781108278386. ISBN 9781108278386.
- ——— (20 December 2020). "The Rise of Counterrevolutionary Anti-Fascism in the United States from the Munich Conference to the Fall of France". Dictatorships & Democracies: 37–68. doi:10.7238/dd.v0i7.3163.
- Shaffer, Ryan (2018). "Pan-European thought in British fascism: the International Third Position and the Alliance for Peace and Freedom". Patterns of Prejudice. 52 (1): 78–99. doi:10.1080/0031322X.2017.1417191.
- Shenfield, Stephen (2016) [2001]. Russian Fascism: Traditions Tendencies Movements (2nd ed.). New York: Routledge. doi:10.4324/9781315500058. ISBN 9781315500058.
- Shirer, William L. (1960). The Rise and Fall of the Third Reich. New York: Simon & Schuster. LCCN 60-6729.
- Silva, Christianna (6 September 2020). "Fascism Scholar Says U.S. Is 'Losing Its Democratic Status'". NPR. Archived from the original on 7 September 2020.
- Slomp, Hans (2011). Europe, A Political Profile: An American Companion to European Politics. ABC-CLIO. ISBN 978-0-313-39181-1.
- "Neo-Nazi". Southern Poverty Law Center. Archived from the original on 12 February 2021.
- Spektorowski, Alberto; Ireni-Saban, Liza (2013). Politics of Eugenics: Productionism, Population, and National Welfare. Routledge.
- Spielvogel, Jackson J. (2012). Western Civilization. Wadsworth, Cengage Learning.
- Stackelberg, Roderick (1999). Hitler's Germany. Routledge. ISBN 978-0-203-00541-5 – via Google Books.
- Stapley, Garth (14 August 2017). "'This is a huge victory.' Oakdale white supremacist revels after deadly Virginia clash". The Modesto Bee. Archived from the original on 15 August 2017.
- Steiner, Zara (2011). The Triumph of the Dark: European International History, 1933–1939. Oxford University Press. doi:10.1093/acprof:osobl/9780199676095.001.0001. ISBN 9780199676095.
- Strang, G. Bruce (2000). In Dubious Battle: Mussolini's Mentalité and Italian Foreign Policy, 1936–1939 (PDF) (PhD). McMaster University. Archived from the original (PDF) on 22 May 2025.
- Sternhell, Zeev; Sznajder, Mario; Ashéri, Maia (1994) [1989]. The Birth of Fascist Ideology: From Cultural Rebellion to Political Revolution. Translated by Maisei, David. Princeton University Press. ISBN 9780691044866.
- Sternhell, Zeev (1998). "Crisis of Fin-de-siècle Thought". In Griffin, Roger (ed.). International Fascism: Theories, Causes and the New Consensus. London and New York: Bloomsbury Academic. ISBN 978-0340706138.
- Tenorio, Rich (30 September 2023). "Fascism in America: a long history that predates Trump". The Guardian. ISSN 0261-3077. Archived from the original on 12 February 2024.
- Tierney, Helen (1999). Women's studies encyclopedia. Westport, Connecticut: Greenwood Publishing Group. ISBN 978-0-313-31072-0. OCLC 38504469.
- Toniolo, Gianni, ed. (2013). The Oxford Handbook of the Italian Economy Since Unification. Oxford: Oxford University Press.
- Valencia-García, Louie Dean (2018). Antiauthoritarian Youth Culture in Francoist Spain: Clashing with Fascism. Bloomsbury Academic. ISBN 978-1-3500-3849-3.
- Weber, Eugen (1982) [1964]. Varieties of Fascism: Doctrines of Revolution in the Twentieth Century. New York: Van Nostrand Reinhold Company. ISBN 978-0-89874-444-6 – via Google Books. Contains chapters on fascist movements in different countries.
- Weill, Kelly (27 March 2018). "Neo-Confederate League of the South Banned From Armed Protesting in Charlottesville". The Daily Beast.
- Weiss-Wendt, Anton; Krieken, Robert; Cave, Alfred A. (2008). The Historiography of Genocide. New York: Springer. ISBN 978-0-230-29778-4 – via Google Books.
- Welge, Jobst (2007). "Fascist Modernism". In Eysteinsson, Astradur; Liska, Vivian (eds.). Modernism, Volumes 1–2. John Benjamins Publishing.
- "Systemic Transformations and the Drift Toward Fascism in Russia". Wilson Center. 11 February 2008. Archived from the original on 2 September 2023.
- Wistrich, Robert (October 1976). "Leon Trotsky's Theory of Fascism". Journal of Contemporary History. 11 (4). Thousand Oaks, California: SAGE Publishing: 157–184. doi:10.1177/002200947601100409. JSTOR 260195. S2CID 140420352.
- Wodak, Ruth (2020). The Politics of Fear: The Shameless Normalization of Far-Right Discourse. United Kingdom: SAGE Publications. ISBN 978-1-5264-9921-9. LCCN 2020934796.
- Woodley, Daniel (2010). Fascism and Political Theory: Critical Perspectives on Fascist Ideology. London and New York: Routledge. ISBN 978-0-415-47354-5.
- Woolf, Stuart (1981). Fascism in Europe. Methuen. ISBN 978-0-416-30240-0 – via Google Books.
  - ——— (1983). Fascism in Europe (3rd ed.). Taylor & Francis.
- Wootson, Cleve R. Jr. (13 August 2017). "Here's what a neo-Nazi rally looks like in 2017 America". The Washington Post. Archived from the original on 19 July 2019.
- Woshinsky, Oliver (2008). Explaining Politics: Culture, Institutions, and Political Behavior. Oxford, England; New York: Routledge. ISBN 9780415960786.
- Zafirovski, Milan (2008). Modern Free Society and Its Nemesis: Liberty Versus Conservatism in the New Millennium. Lexington Books. ISBN 978-0-7391-1516-9.
- Zimmer, Oliver (2003). Nationalism in Europe, 1890–1940. Studies in European History. London: Palgrave. doi:10.1007/978-1-4039-4388-0. ISBN 978-1-4039-4388-0.
- Zimmerman, Joshua D. (27 June 2005). Jews in Italy Under Fascist and Nazi Rule, 1922–1945. Cambridge University Press. ISBN 978-0-521-84101-6.

=== Tertiary sources ===
- Badie, Bertrand; Berg-Schlosser, Dirk; Morlino, Leonardo (2011). "Fascism". In Badie, Bertrand; Berg-Schlosser, Dirk; Morlino, Leonardo (eds.). International Encyclopedia of Political Science. SAGE Publications. doi:10.4135/9781412994163. ISBN 9781412959636.
- Blamires, Cyprian (2006). World Fascism: A Historical Encyclopedia. Vol. 1. Santa Barbara, CA: ABC-CLIO.
  - Umland, Andreas. "Bolshevism". In Blamires (2006), pp. 95–97.
  - Griffin, Roger. "Community". In Blamires (2006), pp. 140–143.
  - Pollard, John. "Corporatism". In Blamires (2006), pp. 150–151.
  - Morgan, Philip. "Economics". In Blamires (2006), pp. 187–190.
  - Lowe, Sid. "Franco y Bahamonde, General Francisco (1892–1975)". In Blamires (2006), pp. 249–250.
- Blamires, Cyprian (2006b). World Fascism: A Historical Encyclopedia. Vol. 2. Santa Barbara, CA: ABC-CLIO, Inc.
  - Griffin, Roger. "Nationalism". In Blamires (2006b), pp. 451–453.
  - Gentile, Emilio. "Totalitarianism". In Blamires (2006b), pp. 669–672.
- "Fasces". Encyclopedia Britannica. Archived from the original on 7 April 2025.
- "Fascism". Encyclopedia Britannica. 8 January 2008.
- "Fascism". Merriam-Webster Online. Archived from the original on 22 August 2017.
- "Italy: The Fascist Era". Encyclopædia Britannica. Archived from the original on 7 October 2017.
- "Fiume question". Encyclopædia Britannica. Archived from the original on 6 May 2025.
- "Franco's dictatorship". Encyclopædia Britannica. Archived from the original on 17 March 2025.
- "Volksgemeinschaft". Encyclopædia Britannica. 2019. Archived from the original on 31 March 2019.
- "Neofascismo" [Neofascism]. Treccani (in Italian). Enciclopedia Italiana. 31 October 2014. Archived from the original on 6 November 2014.
- "Anti-Jewish Legislation in Prewar Germany". Holocaust Encyclopedia. United States Holocaust Memorial Museum. Archived from the original on 6 May 2025.
- ""Degenerate" Art". Holocaust Encyclopedia. United States Holocaust Memorial Museum. Archived from the original on 26 April 2025.
- "Fascism". Holocaust Encyclopedia. United States Holocaust Memorial Museum. Archived from the original on 28 March 2025.
- "Persecution of Homosexuals in the Third Reich". Holocaust Encyclopedia. United States Holocaust Memorial Museum. Archived from the original on 6 October 2008.
- Staudenmaier, Peter (2004). "Fascism". In Krech III, Shepard; McNeill, John; Merchant, Carolyn (eds.). Encyclopedia of World Environmental History. Routledge. pp. 517–521. ISBN 0-415-93733-7.

=== Further reading ===
- Ahmed, Saladdin (July 2023). "Fascism as an Ideological Form: A Critical Theory". Critical Sociology. 49 (4–5): 669–687. doi:10.1177/08969205221109869. ISSN 0896-9205.
- Albright, Madeleine (2018). Fascism: a warning. London: HarperCollins. ISBN 978-0-00-828227-1. OCLC 1031976003.
- Alcalde, Ángel (May 2020). "The Transnational Consensus: Fascism and Nazism in Current Research". Contemporary European History. 29 (2): 243–252. doi:10.1017/S0960777320000089. ISSN 0960-7773. S2CID 213889043.
- Ben-Ghiat, Ruth (2020). Strongmen: Mussolini to the Present (1st ed.). W.W. Norton & Company. ISBN 978-1-324001546. OCLC 1192304012.
- Berezin, Mabel (30 July 2019). "Fascism and Populism: Are They Useful Categories for Comparative Sociological Analysis?". Annual Review of Sociology. 45 (1): 345–361. doi:10.1146/annurev-soc-073018-022351. ISSN 0360-0572.
- Churchwell, Sarah (22 June 2020). "American Fascism: It Has Happened Here" (PDF). The New York Review of Books. p. 22. ISSN 0028-7504.
- De Felice, Renzo (1977). Interpretations of Fascism. Harvard University Press. ISBN 978-0-674-45962-5.
- De Felice, Renzo (1976). Fascism: An Informal Introduction to Its Theory and Practice. Transaction Books. ISBN 978-0-87855-619-9 – via Google Books.
- Durán, Gil (2026). The Nerd Reich: Silicon Valley Fascism and the War on Democracy. Simon & Schuster. ISBN 978-1668221426.
- Esposito, Fernando; Zentrum Für Zeithistorische Forschung Potsdam (August 2017). "Fascism – Concepts and Theories". Docupedia-Zeitgeschichte. 31. doi:10.14765/ZZF.DOK.2.1111.V1.
- Finchelstein, Federico (2019). From Fascism to populism in history: with a new preface. Oakland, California: University of California Press. ISBN 978-0-520-30935-7.
- Rethinking antifascism: history, memory and political uses, 1922 to the present. New York (N.Y.): Berghahn Books. 2016. ISBN 978-1-78533-138-1.
- Hayes, Paul M. (2016). Fascism. Routledge library editions Racism and fascism. London: Routledge. ISBN 978-1-138-93837-3.
- Illing, Sean (19 September 2018). "How Fascism Works: A Yale philosopher on fascism, truth, and Donald Trump". Vox.
- Joes, Anthony James; Gregor, A. James (2019). Fascism in the contemporary world: ideology, evolution, resurgence. London; New York: Routledge. ISBN 978-0-367-01749-1.
- Kagan, Robert (2020). "This is how fascism comes to America" (PDF). In Ball, Terence; Dagger, Richard; O'Neill, Daniel L (eds.). Ideals and ideologies: a reader (11th ed.). New York: Routledge. pp. 369–371. ISBN 978-0-367-23504-8.
- Klein, Naomi; Taylor, Astra (2026). End Times Fascism: And the Fight for the Living World. Farrar, Straus and Giroux. ISBN 978-0374621384.
- Kuklick, Bruce (2022). Fascism comes to America: a century of obsession in politics and culture. Chicago; London: The University of Chicago Press. ISBN 978-0-226-82146-7.
- Mattei, Clara E. (2022). The Capital Order: How Economists Invented Austerity and Paved the Way to Fascism. University of Chicago Press. ISBN 978-0-226-81839-9.
- McGaughey, Ewan (30 December 2018). "Fascism-lite in America (or The Social Ideal of Donald Trump)". British Journal of American Legal Studies. 7 (2): 291–315. doi:10.2478/bjals-2018-0012. ISSN 2049-4092. S2CID 195842347. SSRN 2773217.
- Riley, Dylan J. (2010). The civic foundations of fascism in Europe: Italy, Spain, and Romania, 1870-1945. Baltimore: Johns Hopkins University Press. ISBN 978-0-8018-9427-5. OCLC 370387631.
- Seldes, George (1935). Sawdust Caesar: The Untold History of Mussolini and Fascism. New York and London: Harper and Brothers.
- Seldes, George (2009) [1943]. Facts and Fascism. New York: In Fact. ISBN 978-0-930852-43-6.
- Stanley, Jason (2024). Erasing history: how fascists rewrite the past to control the future. New York: One Signal Publishers. ISBN 978-1-6680-5691-2. OCLC 1450005012.
- Wiskemann, Elizabeth (December 1967). "The Origins of Fascism". History Today. Vol. 17, no. 12. pp. 812–818.

=== Primary sources ===
- Galeazzo, Ciano (2001). The Ciano Diaries, 1939–1943. Simon Publications. ISBN 978-1-931313-74-2.
- Gentile, Giovanni (1932). The Doctrine of Fascism.
- Goebbels, Joseph (2019). Dalton, Thomas (ed.). Goebbels on the Jews: The Complete Diary Entries – 1923 to 1945.
  - Taylor, Fred, ed. (1983). The Goebbels Diaries 1939–1941.
- Hitler, Adolf (1925). Mein Kampf.
- Mosely, Oswald (1968). My Life. Nelson Publications.
- de Oliveira Salazar, António (1939). Doctrine and Action: Internal and Foreign Policy of the New Portugal, 1928–1939. Faber and Faber.
- de Rivera, José Antonio Primo (1971). Textos de Doctrina Política [Political Doctrine Texts] (in Spanish). Madrid: Delegación Nacional de la Sección Femenina del Movimiento.

=== Secondary sources ===
- Adams, Ian (1993). Political Ideology Today. Manchester, England: Manchester University Press. ISBN 978-0-7190-6020-5.
- Ball, Terence; Bellamy, Richard (2003). The Cambridge History of Twentieth-Century Political Thought. Cambridge University Press. ISBN 978-0-521-56354-3 – via Google Books.
- Ben-Ami, Shlomo (1983). Fascism from Above: The Dictatorship of Primo de Rivera in Spain, 1923–1930. Oxford University Press. ISBN 978-0-19-822596-6 – via Google Books.
- ——— (1995). Salazar's Dictatorship and European Fascism: Problems of Interpretation. Social Science Monographs. ISBN 978-0-88033-968-1 – via Google Books.
- Costa Pinto, Antonio, ed. (2011). Rethinking the Nature of Fascism: Comparative Perspectives. Palgrave Macmillan.
- Pinto, Antonio Costa; Eatwell, Roger; Larsen, Stein Ugelvik, eds. (2014). Charisma and Fascism in Interwar Europe. Routledge. ISBN 978-1317834533.
- Doordan, Dennis P. (1995). In the Shadow of the Fasces: Political Design in Fascist Italy. The MIT Press. ISBN 978-0-299-14874-4.
- Fritzsche, Peter (1990). Rehearsals for Fascism: Populism and Political Mobilization in Weimar Germany. Oxford University Press. ISBN 978-0-19-505780-5.
- ——— (2000). "Revolution from the Right: Fascism"". In Parker, David (ed.). Revolutions and the Revolutionary Tradition in the West 1560–1991. London: Routledge.
- Held, David (1980). Introduction to Critical Theory: Horkheimer to Habermas. University of California Press. ISBN 978-0-520-04175-2.
- Horne, John (2002). State, Society and Mobilization in Europe During the First World War. Cambridge: Cambridge University Press. ISBN 978-0-521-52266-3.
- ——— (April 2003a). "To Expand or Not to Expand? Territory, Generic Fascism and the Quest for an 'Ideal Fatherland'". Journal of Contemporary History. 38 (2): 237–260. doi:10.1177/0022009403038002132. S2CID 159641856.
- Kertzer, David I. (2014). The Pope and Mussolini: The Secret History of Pius XI and the Rise of Fascism in Europe. Oxford University Press. ISBN 978-0-19-871616-7 – via Google Books.
- Kitsikis, Dimitri (2005). Pour une étude scientifique du fascisme [For a scientific study of fascism] (in French). Ars Magna Editions. ISBN 978-2-912164-11-7.
- ——— (2006). Jean-Jacques Rousseau et les origines françaises du fascisme [Jean-Jacques Rousseau and the French origins of fascism] (in French). Ars Magna Editions. ISBN 978-2-912164-46-9.
- Knox, MacGregor (1999). Mussolini unleashed, 1939–1941: Politics and Strategy in Fascist Italy's Last War. Cambridge: Cambridge University Press.
- Laclau, Ernesto (1977). Politics and Ideology in Marxist Theory: Capitalism, Fascism, Populism. Verso Books.
- Lewis, Paul H (2002). Latin Fascist Elites: The Mussolini, Franco, and Salazar Regimes. Greenwood Publishing Group. ISBN 978-0-275-97880-8 – via Google Books.
- Millington, Chris (2019). A History of Fascism in France: From the First World War to the National Front. Bloomsbury. online review.
- Parkins, Wendy (2002). Fashioning the Body Politic: Dress, Gender, Citizenship. Berg Publishers. ISBN 978-1-85973-587-9.
- ——— (1987). The Franco Regime, 1936–1975. University of Wisconsin Press. ISBN 978-0-299-11070-3 – via Google Books.
- ——— (2003). Falange: A History of Spanish Fascism. Textbook Publishers. ISBN 978-0-7581-3445-5. online.
- Rosas, Fernando (2019). Salazar e os Fascismos: Ensaio Breve de História Comparada [Salazar and the Fascisms: Brief Essay on Comparative History] (in Portuguese). Edições Tinta-da-China. ISBN 9789896714840.
- Sauer, Wolfgang (December 1967). "National Socialism: totalitarianism or fascism?". The American Historical Review. 73 (2): 404–424. doi:10.2307/1866167. JSTOR 1866167.
- Sohn-Rethel, Alfred (1978). Economy and Class Structure of German Fascism. London: CSE Bks. ISBN 978-0-906336-00-7.
- Vatikiotis, Panayiotis J (1988). Popular Autocracy in Greece, 1936–1941: A Political Biography of General Ioannis Metaxas. Routledge. ISBN 978-0-7146-4869-9 – via Google Books.
- Webster's II New College Dictionary. Houghton Mifflin Reference Books. 2005. ISBN 978-0-618-39601-6.
- Weiss, John (1967). The Fascist Tradition: Radical Right-Wing Extremism in Modern Europe. New York City: Harper & Row. ASIN B0014D2EN8.
