= List of strikes in Italy =

Throughout the history of Italy, a number of strikes, labour disputes, student strikes, hunger strikes, and other industrial actions have occurred.

== Background ==
A labour strike is a work stoppage caused by the mass refusal of employees to work. This can include wildcat strikes, which are done without union authorisation, and slowdown strikes, where workers reduce their productivity while still carrying out minimal working duties. It is usually a response to employee grievances, such as low pay or poor working conditions. Strikes can also occur to demonstrate solidarity with workers in other workplaces or pressure governments to change policies.

== 19th century ==
- Bava Beccaris massacre
- Fasci Siciliani, from 1889 to 1894 in Sicily.

== 20th century ==
=== 1900s ===
- 1904 Italian general strike, following the killing of several striking miners.

=== 1910s ===
- Red Week
- Biennio Rosso

=== 1920s ===
- 1922 Italian general strike, against fascism.

=== 1940s ===
- 1948 Italian agricultural strikes
- July 1948 Italian general strike, general strike in Italy called by the Italian General Confederation of Labour following an assassination attempt on Palmiro Togliatti.
- 1949 Italian farm strike, 6-week strike by farm workers.
- 1949 Italian general strike, in December.

=== 1950s ===
- 1956 Italian farm strike

=== 1960s ===
- 1964 Italian newspaper strikes, including strikes by printers and by journalists.
- 1968 Lampedusa general strike, general strike in Lampedusa against nuclear waste.
- Hot Autumn

=== 1980s ===
- 1980 Fiat strike, 5-week strike by Fiat autoworkers against layoffs.
- 1982 Capri boatmen's strike, strike by boatmen in Capri, Italy, demanding to receive a share of increases in ticket prices.
- 1982 Jewish strike in Rome, strike by the Jewish community in Rome in protest against a visit by PLO leader Yasser Arafat to Rome where he was met by Italian president Sandro Pertini and Pope John Paul II.
- 1985 Italian journalists' strike

=== 1990s ===
- 1996 Serie A strike, strike by Serie A football players in Italy.
- 1998 Italian dubbers' strike, strike by film dubbing workers in Italy.
- 1998 Roman taxi strike, 10-day strike by taxi drivers in Rome, Italy, against deregulation.

== 21st century ==
=== 2000s ===
- 2000 Italian McDonald's strikes, first strike by McDonald's fast food workers in Italy.

=== 2010s ===
- 2012 European general strike, against austerity.
- 2014 Italian general strike, against labour reforms making it easier to fire workers.

=== 2020s ===
- 2021 Italian taxi strike;
- October 2021 Italian general strike;
- 2024 Milan Stock Exchange strike, the first strike in the history of the Borsa Italiana, in protest over Euronext divestment from Italy.
- 2024 RAI strike, over alleged interference in the public broadcaster by the government of Giorgia Meloni.
