= Left-interventionism =

World War I-era Italian political movement

Left-interventionism was the part of the progressive interventionist movement of various left-wing Italian matrices, such as those of Mazzinian, social reformist, democratic socialist, dissident socialist, reformist socialist, and revolutionary socialist persuasions, that saw in the Great War the historical opportunity for the completion of unification of Italy, and for those who later became part of the Italian fascist movement, such as Benito Mussolini, as the palingenesis of the Italian political system and the organization of the economic, legal, and social system, and therefore a profound change.

A part of left-interventionism joined the nascent fascist movement, while many others went on to become part of the opposition. Left-interventionism was a minority position among socialists, such as the young Palmiro Togliatti, that, in the words of Battista Santhià, distinguished "between the imperialist war and the just national claims against the old imperialisms; they did not consider it right that some Italian provinces should remain under the dominion of a foreign state, moreover a reactionary one."

== History ==
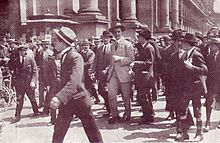
A pro-interventionist demonstration

Left-interventionism (in Italian: interventismo di sinistra) originated from a process of internal self-criticism carried out by a substantial part of the revolutionary syndicalist movement, which, after the failure of Red Week in June 1914, gave rise to a theoretical evolution of its thinking. In the following weeks, Alceste De Ambris declared himself in favour of Italy's entry into the Great War alongside France, a fact that cost him his expulsion from the anarcho-syndicalist trade union Unione Sindacale Italiana (USI). This led first to the simultaneous voluntary expulsion from the USI, headed by Armando Borghi, a neutralist and internationalist anarchist, of the strong Milanese section, led by Filippo Corridoni, and then to the expulsion of all interventionist sections. These went on to join with Futurist interventionism, which was already creating unrest in the squares with Filippo Tommaso Marinetti and Umberto Boccioni.

On 5 October 1914, Angelo Oliviero Olivetti created the Fasci Rivoluzionari d'Azione Interventista, into which all the movements in the area converged, and at the same time a manifesto, a political program supporting left-interventionism, was promoted. The movement aimed to operate a strong critique of the Italian Socialist Party (PSI) and its neutralist position, seeing its failure to support the war as a lack of political perspective and reactionarism toward history in motion. The Great War was seen as a historical opportunity to be exploited, a historical coincidence that could have acted as a catalyst for the revolutionary impulses of the Italian people, which, forged by the wartime experience, or what came to be termed as the trinceocrazia, (Note: The term trinceocrazia (literally "trenchcracy", etymologically "power of the trenches") denotes a mode of governance originated during World War I, in which soldiers' expertise in trench warfare determined their level of influence among the other soldiers.) should become aware of their potential by overthrowing the constituted powers of the state. In conclusion, the left-interventionists argued that if the people could not find within themselves the spark to ignite change, it would have to be an external factor, such as the war itself.

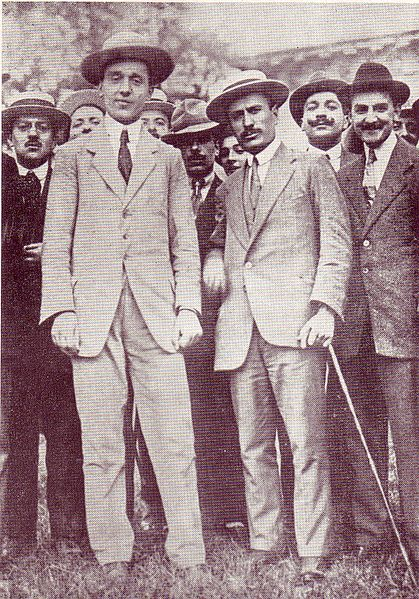
Filippo Corridoni with Benito Mussolini during a 1915 interventionist demonstration in Milan

On 18 October 1914, Benito Mussolini, editor of the PSI's official newspaper Avanti! "Foirward!) and until then a supporter of Italian neutrality as per party directives, published an article on the third page, in which he argued that maintaining the neutral country line would have ghettoized the movement, relegating it to a subordinate position. He proposed arming the people for war; once it was over, they would be turning against the structures of the liberal and bourgeois state, giving rise to a revolution and the triumph of socialism. This cost Mussolini his removal from the newspaper on 20 October 1914, also the date in which the PSI published a manifesto in which it was reiterated its opposition to the conflict, and a few weeks later, on 8 November 1914, the same party reunited in Bologna to unanimously express the position of incompatibility between socialism and war.

On 15 November 1914, less than a month after his removal from the party's newspaper, Mussolini came out with the first copy of a new newspaper he founded, Il Popolo d'Italia ("The People of Italy"), with a strongly interventionist line that earned for himself on 29 November 1914 the expulsion from the PSI because of his provocations against his comrades. On 14 November 1914, in an article entitled "Audacia" ("Audacity"), in the columns of the new newspaper, he had written: "Today — I shout it out loud — anti-war propaganda is the propaganda of cowardice. It has luck because it tickles and exasperates the instinct of individual self-preservation. But for that very reason it is anti-revolutionary propaganda ... And as we resume the march it is up to you, young people of Italy; young people from factories and universities; young in years and young in spirit; young people who belong to the generation to which destiny has committed to make history; it is to you that I launch my cry of good wishes, sure that it will have in your ranks a vast resonance of echoes and sympathies ... 'War'."

Under the influence of Mussolini and Gaetano Salvemini, the then PSI member and university student Antonio Gramsci wrote an article in the socialist weekly of Turin, Il Grido del Popolo ("The Cry of the People"), that was published on 31 October 1914 and entitled "Neutralità attiva e operante" ("Active and Operating Neutrality"), with which he would deviate from the official party line and split the ranks of the young Turin socialists. Gramsci's fellow Turinese socialist Palmiro Togliatti volunteered in the Royal Italian Army. The socialists Salvemini, Leonida Bissolati, and Carlo Rosselli were the voices of the front defined as democratic interventionism; they advocated a democratic alliance between Italy and the populations oppressed by the Austro-Hungarian Empire for reciprocal liberation. Salvemini thought that "Germany's victory over France would be considered as proof of the incapacity of democracy to live freely alongside authoritarian political regimes, and would unleash the damage and shame of a long anti-democratic reaction on all of Europe." Irredentism and the ideals of the Risorgimento expanded in the pages of Salvemini in the columns of L'Unità ("The Unity"), until they coincided with the defense of democratic civilization as opposed to the authoritarian culture personified by the Central Powers. Similar arguments united the socialist brothers Ugo Guido Mondolfo and Rodolfo Mondolfo to the interventionist democratic front.

Mussolini being arrested in Rome on 11 April 1915 after a pro-interventionist rally

Pietro Nenni, a long-time friend of Mussolini and later an anti-fascist and opponent of Mussolini's Fascist Italy, embraced the interventionist battle but from different premises, being at the time a republican. In later years, he recalled: "I agreed with Mussolini in the interventionist battle, even if moved by different premises: for me, of popular, Garibaldine and Mazzini background, that was the last war of the Risorgimento to complete the unification of Italy. For Mussolini it was instead a revolutionary war and an internal political operation for power." In line with his personal views, the young Nenni volunteered and a commemorative photograph of him was reported in Il Popolo d'Italia.

Between 24 and 25 January 1915, the Fasci d'Azione Rivoluzionaria were founded in the presence of Corridoni and Mussolini, among others. It was in this year that numerous left-interventionists were called up, including Corridoni and Mussolini themselves. Corridoni found death in the trenches, assaulting the Austro-Hungarian Army lines on the Carso, while Mussolini, also assigned to the front line, published a daily diary from the front that was later published as book titled Il mio diario di guerra ("My War Diary") in which he would recount life in the war trenches. Back as a civilian, Mussolini abandoned socialism and changed the title of Il Popolo d'Italia from Quotidiano socialista ("Socialist Daily") to Quotidiano dei combattenti e dei produttori ("Daily of the Fighters and Producers").

In his work about Nenni's life, Guido Cerosa saw 24 November 1914, the date of his expulsion from the PSI's Milanese section "for political and moral unworthiness", as the death of Mussolini as a socialist left-interventionist and the beginning of a process that would see him leading the Italian fascist movement. Later in December, Mussolini published an article entitled "Trincerocrazia" ("Trenchcracy"), in which he reclaimed for the veterans of the trenches the right to govern post-war Italy and prefigured the combatants of the Great War as the aristocracy of tomorrow and the central nucleus of a new ruling class. Mussolini's former PSI party members saw him as a traitor who sold out to capitalism for personal ambition.

== Within the broad interventionist movement ==
Left-interventionism was part of the broad interventionist movement that gathered elements of heterogeneous provenance, including anti-Giolittian democrats and liberals invoking the liberation of Trento and Trieste as the culmination of the Risorgimento; nationalists who demanded the affirmation of Italian power and initially identified the enemy in the Entente Powers rather than in the Central Powers; writers headed by Gabriele D'Annunzio, such as the Futurist; socialists and former socialists influenced by revolutionary syndicalism; and refugees from the unredeemed lands, such as Cesare Battisti, among others. Although initially a minority, it played an important part in determining the increasingly widespread mood that in 1915 made it possible for the Kingdom of Italy to enter the war against the will of the majority of the Italian Parliament.

=== List of notable participants ===
- Alberto Acquacalda
- Gabriele D'Annunzio
- Vincenzo Baldazzi
- Cesare Battisti
- Camillo Bellieni
- Michele Bianchi
- Leonida Bissolati
- Ivanoe Bonomi
- Piero Calamandrei
- Filippo Corridoni
- Alceste De Ambris
- Attilio Deffenu
- Aldo Eluisi
- Roberto Farinacci
- Gabriele Foschiatti
- Antonio Gramsci
- Emilio Lussu
- Ercole Miani
- Rodolfo Mondolfo
- Ugo Guido Mondolfo
- Benito Mussolini
- Pietro Nenni
- Vittorio Picelli
- Carlo Rosselli
- Ernesto Rossi
- Gaetano Salvemini
- Nazario Sauro
- Carlo Sforza
- Palmiro Togliatti

== See also ==
- Italian irredentism
- Italian nationalism
- Internationalist–defencist schism
- National Labor Party
