= Fascio Rivoluzionario d'Azione Internazionalista =

Revolutionary Fasces of Internationalist Action Fascio Rivoluzionario d'Azione Internazionalista
- Leader: Alceste de Ambris
- Founder: Filippo Corridoni
- Founded: 4 October 1914; 112 years ago
- Dissolved: 11 December 1914; 111 years ago
- Split from: Unione Sindacale Italiana; Unione Sindacale Milanese; Italian Socialist Party; Defencists
- Merged into: Fasci d'Azione Rivoluzionaria
- Headquarters: Via Eustachi 50, Milan
- Ideology: Left-interventionism; Factions: Revolutionary syndicalism Defencist socialists Progressive nationalism Radical republicanism Anti-germanism
- Political position: Left-wing

The Fascio Rivoluzionario d'Azione Internazionalista (lit. 'Revolutionary Fasces of Internationalist Action'; fig.: 'Revolutionary League of Internationalist Action') was a political movement that advocated Italy's participation in World War I on the side of the Triple Entente against the Central Powers. The movement's manifesto was drawn up on 5 October 1914 by revolutionary syndicalists and left interventionists former members of the Unione Sindacale Italiana. The usefulness of the First World War was asserted as an indispensable historical moment for developing more advanced societies in a political-social sense. The manifesto inspired the formation of the Fasci d'Azione Rivoluzionaria.

== History ==
The nationalist right-wing was not alone in their eagerness for Italian intervention during the Great War. A diverse group of fervent leftists, later known as left interventionists, also emerged in support of the war effort. Among these leftists were middle-class radicals and republicans who held relatively moderate views and were more vocal supporters of intervention from the revolutionary left. A minority of leaders and writers of revolutionary syndicalism had previously supported the war against Turkey in 1911. Despite the Unione Sindacale Italiana (USI) adopting a neutralist resolution in August 1914, syndicalist leaders such as Alceste de Ambris rejected it. They called for intervention on the side of the Entente. This move led the Unione Sindacale Milanese to support the cause. Various syndicalist leaders and key local groups formed a new interventionist organization, the Fascio Rivoluzionario d'Azione Internazionalista, by October.

The term Fascio by the newly formed Fascio Rivoluzionario was common among the Italian left. In fact, it had been a standard practice among various sectors of Italian radicalism since the 1870s. The term was used by trade unions, middle-class radicals, and even reformist peasants to organize various Fasci. The most notable among them were the Fasci Siciliani, which had led a revolt against Sicily's existing political and economic structure during 1892–93. Therefore, the adoption of this nomenclature by the Fascio Rivoluzionario was not surprising.

The leaders of the Fascio Rivoluzionario d'Azione Internazionalista believed that engaging in the war did not mean abandoning the social revolution. They argued that the war would be the most direct way towards revolution. The leaders believed that previous class-based revolts, such as the Parma general strike of 1908 or the Red Week, had failed to mobilize broad support or engage all social forces. Entry into the war could expedite the course by mobilizing all of Italy for the first time, generating massive commitment that could catalyze the entire society. The Entente cause was synonymous with progress and the ultimate revolution against German-Austrian militarism and imperialism, the main obstacles to decisive revolutionary change in Europe. Like the Bolsheviks in Russia, the Italian Socialist Party (PSI) refused to support the war effort due to deep social division and a lack of national integration in Italy.

Benito Mussolini's public opposition to the official Socialist position on 18 October 1914, led to his resignation as Avanti's editor just two days later. In mid-November, he launched a new publication, Il Popolo d'Italia funded by pro-war business interests. Mussolini quickly became the most prominent figure in the Fascio Rivoluzionario after joining in December 1914. His associates were a diverse group, comprising revolutionary syndicalists, new "national syndicalists" like Sergio Panunzio who had abandoned revolutionary syndicalism, various pro-war revolutionary and reformist Socialists, progressive nationalists from the magazine La Voce, and radical republicans. The focus was on mobilizing the masses and involving them in a great national enterprise, eventually leading to a revolution.

On 11 December 1914, Mussolini reorganized the Fascio as the Fasci d'Azione Rivoluzionaria, which was a fusion of Fasci autonomi d’azione rivoluzionaria (which Mussolini created) and the Fascio d'Azione Internazionalista. On 6 January 1915, Il Popolo d'Italia referred to the Fasci d'Azione Rivoluzionaria as the "fascist movement". Simultaneously, Filippo Tommaso Marinetti's avant-garde Futurists, who held the most aggressive pro-war views, formed their own Fasci Politici Futuristi to encourage Italian involvement in the conflict.

== Manifesto ==
In the manifesto, Fascio adherents describe themselves as socialists who fight imperialism in the name of the working class. It is also stated: "Our cause is that of Amilcare Cipriani, of Kropotkine, of James Guillaume, of Vaillant, that of the European revolution against barbarism, authoritarianism, militarism, Germanic feudalism and the Catholic perfidy of Austria." This statement reflects a debate within the anarchist movement at the time; interventionist positions such as those of Alceste de Ambris were supported by anarchist like Kropotkin, but strongly contested by others (e.g., Errico Malatesta) because such positions allegedly gave a political-historical priority to constitutional and liberal democratic ideals of the countries involved in the conflict over the revolutionary perspective.

== Committee ==
The promoting committee was formed by:

- Decio Bacchi
- Michele Bianchi
- Ugo Clerici
- Filippo Corridoni
- Amilcare De Ambris
- Attilio Deffenu
- Aurelio Galassi
- Angelo Oliviero Olivetti
- Decio Papa
- Cesare Rossi
- Silvio Rossi
- Sincero Rugarli
- Libero Tancredi
