= Mondolfo (disambiguation) =

Mondolfo is a comune (municipality) in Italy.

Mondolfo may also refer to:

- Mondolfo Airfield, an abandoned World War II military airfield in Italy
- Rodolfo Mondolfo (1877–1976), an Italian philosopher
- Renato Mondolfo (1918-1992), an Italian philatelist
