= Pietro Ferrero (anarchist) =

Italian anarchist (1892–1922)

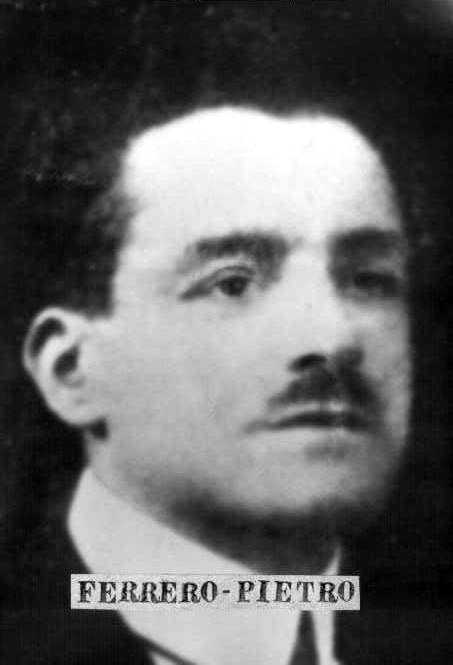
- Born: Grugliasco, 12 May 1892
- Died: Turin, 18 December 1922 (aged 30)
- Cause of death: Tortured and killed by fascists
- Occupations: Anarchist and trade unionist activist

Pietro Ferrero (Grugliasco, 12 May 1892 - Turin, 18 December 1922) was an Italian anarchist and trade unionist. He was assassinated by fascist blackshirts during the 1922 Turin massacre.

== Biography ==
Pietro Ferrero was born in Grugliasco near Turin on 12 May 1892. In 1905 he joined the Social Studies Centre in the Barriera di Milano neighbourhood in Turin, which transformed itself into a Modern School along the principles developed by the Spanish libertarian Francesc Ferrer i Guàrdia. In 1918 he was hired at the Fiat automobile factory.

During World War I Ferrero was active in the General Confederation of Labour (Italian: Confederazione Generale del Lavoro, CGdL) militating in the revolutionary current against the reformist wing of the union. Since 1915 and for the duration of the war, he worked as a militarized worker at the Turin Arsenal, carrying out active propaganda against the participation of workers in the Industrial Mobilization Committees (Italian: Comitato di Mobilitazione Industriale). In 1917, together with anarchist comrades of the Barriera di Milano neighbourhood, he took part in the riots in Turin against the employers and the war.

In 1919 he was elected secretary of the Turin section of the Federation of Metal Workers Employees (Italian: Federazione Impiegati Operai Metallurgici, FIOM). Ferrero, who began collaborating with the journal L'Ordine Nuovo, headed by Antonio Gramsci, from 1919, became one of the most prominent dissidents at FIOM congresses. He was involved in much workplace agitation and many strikes. In April 1920, he was active in the strike against the unilateral decision of Fiat to shift working hours from standard time to daylight saving time leading to the occupation of the factories in September 1920, during the Biennio Rosso.

As a proponent of an intransigent line, Ferrero refused any compromise solution and therefore opposed the decision to hand over occupied factories following the agreement between the employers' federation Confindustria and the General Confederation of Labour at a meeting chaired by Prime Minister Giovanni Giolitti in Rome, which led to the end of the factory occupations. At the national congress of FIOM, convened in Milan from 16 to 21 September 1920 to ratify that agreement, Ferrero fought hard but in vain against the agreement.

On 18 December 1922, he was killed by fascist gangs under the command of Piero Brandimarte during the massacre in Turin. After being tortured, fascists tied Ferrero to a truck and dragged him, presumably still alive, at full speed through the Corso Vittorio Emanuele. After that Ferrero was dumped at the foot of the statue of King Vittorio Emanuele II. His unrecognizable corpse (identified only by a document he was wearing) was found at the foot of the statue.

== See also ==
- Alberto Acquacalda, another Italian anarchist murdered by fascists in 1922
