= Alberto Acquacalda =

Italian anarchist and communist

- Born: 1 August 1898; Ravenna, Romagna, Italy
- Died: 11 August 1921 (aged 23); Lugo, Ravenna, Romagna, Italy
- Cause of death: Assassination
- Political party: Communist Party of Italy
- Other political affiliations: Arditi del Popolo
- Movement: Anti-fascism

Alberto Acquacalda (1 August 1898 – 11 August 1921) was an Italian anarchist and communist. He was a member of the anti-fascist militant group Arditi del Popolo. He was assassinated by fascist blackshirts at the age of 23.

== Biography ==
Ideologically he was educated on Giuseppe Mazzini's ideas and was a "left interventionist". From some notes of the Province of Ravenna (he was filed on 2 August 1921) he was an honest person, well regarded both by the public and within his family. Of higher culture, having attended a technical institute, and being able to advocate for his ideology, he was well known for socializing with anarchists and communists. During Biennio Rosso, he carried out a revolutionary "active propaganda" in the Ravenna area and in January 1921 he joined the Communist Party of Italy. It is specified, again in the filing, that from then on he participated in all party initiatives, demonstrating his organizational and leadership skills. He was appointed instructor and team leader of the Arditi del Popolo of Ravenna.

=== Murder ===
In March 1921 he led Arditi del Popolo in their campaign to face the squadrist offensive in Romagna. Acquacalda died the day after the assassination of Supremo Randi and the fascist establishment in the city of Lugo. He went to the occupied Lugo together with other members of Arditi del Popolo and were forced to stop due to a car breakdown. While being stopped they were recognized by fascists perhaps due to information about their arrival in Lugo having been transmitted to local fascists. They were attacked by blackshirts with sticks, knives and guns and being heavily outnumbered, Acquacalda and his three companions (one of which was Rodolfo Salvagiani) were all wounded. Acquacalda received two stabs and five pistol shots and died at night in Lugo hospital.

== See also ==
- Pietro Ferrero, another Italian anarchist murdered by fascists in 1922
