= Fasci d'Azione Rivoluzionaria =

Leagues of Revolutionary Action Fasci d'Azione Rivoluzionaria
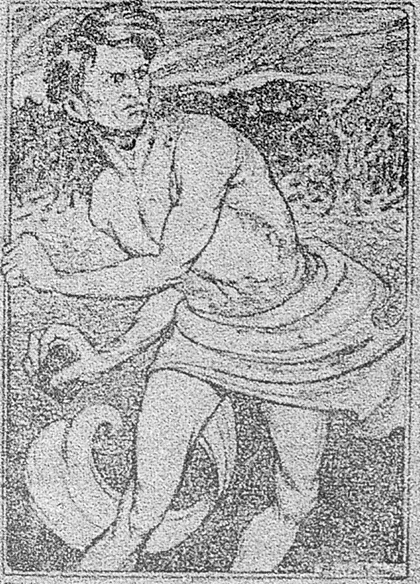
- Leaders: Benito Mussolini; Alceste de Ambris; Angelo Oliviero Olivetti
- Founded: 11 December 1914; 111 years ago
- Dissolved: 1919; 107 years ago
- Split from: USI (interventionist factions); PSI (interventionist factions)
- Preceded by: Fascio Rivoluzionario d'Azione Internazionalista
- Succeeded by: Fasci Italiani di Combattimento
- Ideology: Italian nationalism National syndicalism Republicanism; Left-interventionism; Italian irredentism
- Political position: Left-wing
- Colours: Black

The Fasci d'Azione Rivoluzionaria (English: "Fasces of Revolutionary Action"; fig.: 'Leagues of Revolutionary Action') was an Italian political movement founded in 1914 by Benito Mussolini, and active mainly in 1915. Sponsored by Alceste De Ambris, Mussolini, and Angelo Oliviero Olivetti, it was a pro-war movement aiming to promote Italian entry into World War I. It was connected to the world of revolutionary interventionists and inspired by the programmatic manifesto of the Fascio Rivoluzionario d'Azione Internazionalista, dated 5 October 1914.

The movement achieved its primary goal when Italy declared war on Austria-Hungary in May 1915, and most of the movement's members joined the army. After the war, almost all of them met in 1919 in Piazza San Sepolcro for the foundation of the Fasci Italiani di Combattimento, which preceded the National Fascist Party founded in 1921.

== History ==
The Fasci d'Azione Rivoluzionaria was founded on 11 December 1914 and held its first meeting on 24 January 1915. The First World War had begun in July 1914, but Italy remained neutral, and public opinion as well as the political majority in parliament supported continued neutrality and non-involvement in the war. In this context, the Fasci d'Azione Rivoluzionaria was created as an umbrella organization for pro-war activists led by Benito Mussolini, who were called interventionists because they wished for Italy to intervene in the war.

At the meeting in January 1915, a motion was passed which stated that national problems – including the issue of national borders – needed to be resolved in Italy and elsewhere "for the ideals of justice and liberty for which oppressed peoples must acquire the right to belong to those national communities from which they descended". Mussolini asserted on this occasion that Italy should join the war "for the liberation of the unredeemed peoples of Trentino and Istria", which implied territorial claims over regions inhabited by ethnic Italians. The Fasci d'Azione Rivoluzionaria committed itself to Italian irredentism – the desire to expand the borders of Italy to encompass all ethnic Italians – while also wishing to annex some strategically important territories without an Italian majority, such as South Tyrol.

Benito Mussolini arrested after a political rally in favour of war, in Rome, 11 April 1915

Due to Mussolini's support of Italian intervention in the then-ongoing World War I, he received financial support from Ansaldo (an armaments firm) and other companies, especially from the sugar and electrical industries. He received additional support from government-backed sources in France. Later, in 1917, Mussolini was allegedly also supported by the British Directorate of Military Intelligence, who are claimed to have paid him a £100 weekly wage; this help is said to have been authorised by Sir Samuel Hoare. However, regardless of the financial support he accepted for his pro-interventionist stance, Mussolini's socialist critics noted that Mussolini was free to write whatever he wished in his newspaper Il Popolo d'Italia, without prior sanctioning by his financial backers.

In March 1915, Mussolini declared the movement's irredentist stance towards Trieste, in which he stated that Trieste "must be, and will be Italian through war against the Austrians and, if necessary, against the Slavs". In an article on 6 April 1915, Mussolini addressed the movement's irredentist stance towards Dalmatia, arguing that Italy should not annex all of Dalmatia because claims that it had a majority of Italian speakers were "not a good enough reason to claim exclusive possession of all of Dalmatia". However, he did support Italy annexing a vast section of Dalmatia including its entire archipelago.

The Fasci d'Azione Rivoluzionaria also received ideological influence from members other than Mussolini, such as Giuseppe Prezzolini, who had previously been a member of the Italian Nationalist Association. Prezzolini was impressed by Mussolini, and in late 1914 began to write for Mussolini's newspaper Il Popolo d'Italia. During an interventionist demonstration on 11 April 1915 that was confronted by neutralist PSI members, Italian state police killed one man, an electrician named Innocente Marcora. Both interventionists and neutralists were outraged by the man's death. The Fasci took part in a joint neutralist-interventionist work stoppage for one day on 14 April. In writing about these events, Mussolini referred to his supporters for the first time as "fascists", although he put the word in inverted commas at this time.

Also in April 1915, Mussolini accused Italy's King Victor Emmanuel III of being a pro-German "Philistine", charging him of being "foreign" and allegedly a "neutralist". However, the Italian government was already secretly negotiating the Treaty of London to join the war on the side of the Entente, and in May 1915 the king signed the declaration of war. Most of the members of the Fasci quickly volunteered to join the army and left for the front lines, but Mussolini himself waited until he was conscripted in September 1915; he remained in the army until he was wounded during a training exercise and discharged because of his injuries in June 1917.

== See also ==
- Left-interventionism
- Sansepolcrismo
- Futurist Political Party

== Bibliography ==
- Mauro Canali, Cesare Rossi. Da rivoluzionario a eminenza grigia del fascismo, Il Mulino, Bologna, 1991.
- Luca Leonello Rimbotti, Fascismo rivoluzionario. Il fascismo di sinistra dal sansepolcrismo alla Repubblica Sociale, Passaggio Al Bosco, 2018.
