= 2019 Italian protests =

The 2019 Italian protests was a wave of mass demonstrations and unprecedented wave of massive protest rallies and economic marches led by unions, students and employees demanding the fall of the government of Matteo Salvini and better economic conditions and economic policies to be scrapped. The anti-government movement began in February, in Milan and Turin, protesting economic conditions and began to follow calls for mass demonstrations. Demonstrators marched and chanted using placards and designs, letters, gatherings, meetings and speeches as a tactics to rally and March. Rallying and rallies called for supporters was held weekly in February–March, protesting in their hundreds of thousands with yellow vests and workers used vests of different colours against the governmental policies and in support of Deputy PM Luigi Di Maio. Protesters called for the government, to resign and kept on mounting pressure on government officials. Popular protests consorted of carnivals, parades and chanting, clapping and Union-led slogans depicting the government. In the movement, there was some anarchist-style violence, especially during the strikes in Turin, when anarchist protesters threw projectiles at police. Opposition and street protests to Matteo Salvini continued in Milan, where protesters denounced the right-wing government. Large crowds demanded democratic reforms and the populist government to resign while using balloons, phone lights, candles, flags and ribbons. Rallies led by labour unions and millions of ordinary civilians occurred in May–June and September–October, demanding climate action, fall of government and denouncing far-right policies. Protesters used human chains to link them up and in squares, hundreds of thousands protested with using their arms and making signals and symbols with their arms. Tens of thousands participated in General strikes in Verona and Rome, on the anniversary of the 1922 Italian general strike and campaigned to denounce violence against women. In some cases, chaos erupted when Riot police would fire Tear gas at protesters in towns amid dozens participate in rallies, and demonstrators would be slashed with batons.

== See also ==
- Sardines Movement
