= 2014 Italian general strike =

December 2014 strike in Italy

- Date: 12 December 2014
- Location: Italy

Parties
Italian government led by Matteo Renzi	Italian General Confederation of Labour (CGIL); Italian Labour Union (UIL)

The 2014 Italian general strike was a one-day general strike which took place on 12 December across Italy. Two of the country's largest trade union confederations, the Italian General Confederation of Labour (CGIL) and Italian Labour Union (UIL), participated in the action in an effort to stop a plan put forth by Prime Minister Matteo Renzi to weaken labour laws surrounding the hiring and firing of young workers. The Italian Confederation of Workers' Trade Unions (CISL) did not participate. Thousands of workers stopped work for the day to take part in the action across the country. Public protests were held in most major cities and regions.

In 2011, Italian workers also participated in a general strike against austerity measures proposed by Prime Minister Silvio Berlusconi.

== See also ==
- List of strikes
- 1904 Italian general strike
- 1922 Italian general strike
