= 1922 Turin massacre =

Massacre of unionists by Fascist Italians

Coordinates: 45.0728°N 7.6896°E

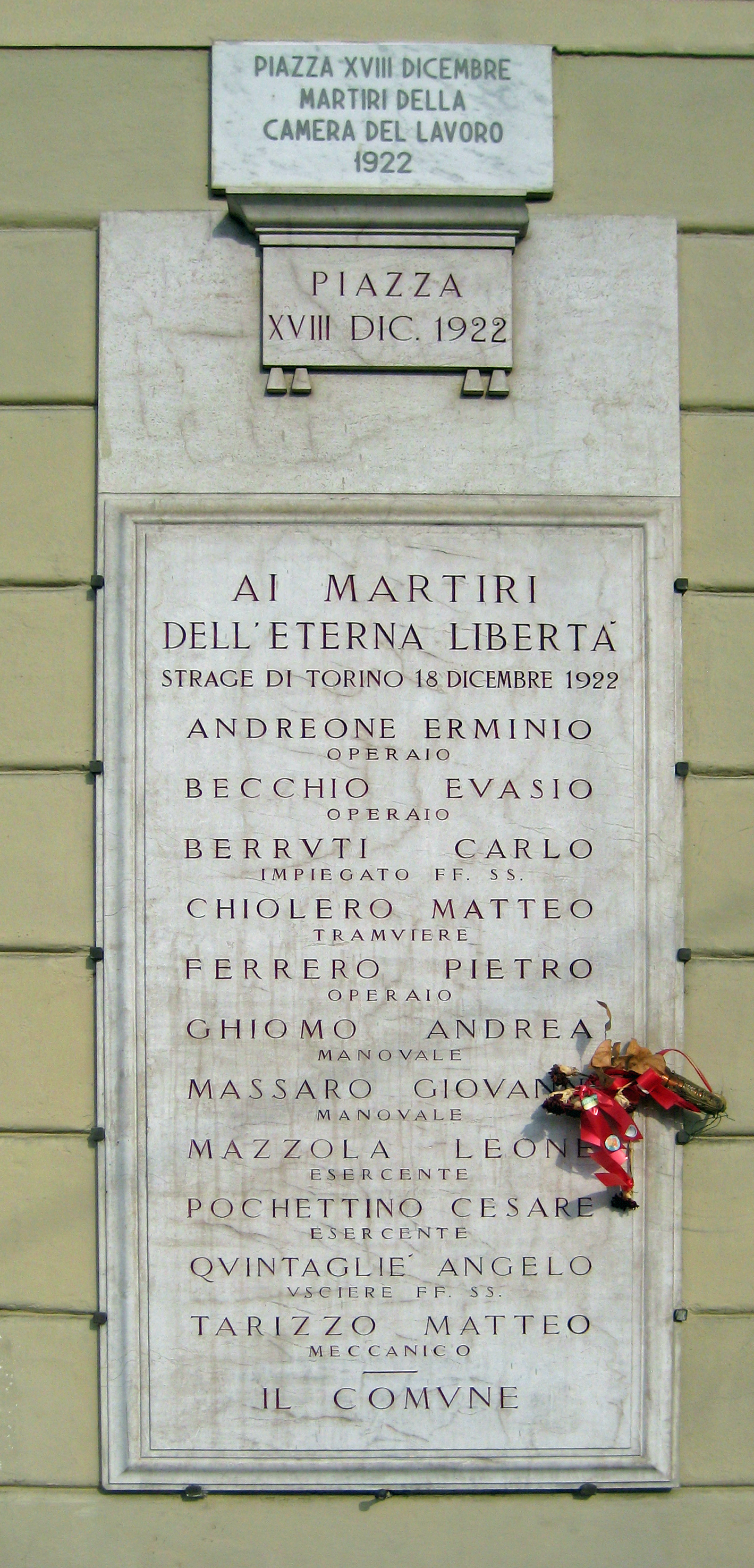
- The plaque remembering the 11 who died was erected in 1946.
- Location: Turin
- Date: 18–20 December 1922
- Target: Communists, atheists, secularists, socialists, members of the local labour movement in Turin
- Attack type: Massacre
- Deaths: 11 killed; 10 seriously wounded
- Perpetrator: Fascist squads led by Piero Brandimarte
- Motive: Anti-communism

The 1922 Turin massacre refers to the attack by Italian fascists against members of a local labour movement in Turin in Italy. Over three days starting on 18 December and ending on 20 December 1922, at least 11 workers and perhaps as many as 24 were killed in a terror campaign to break the resistance to fascism by the labour movement and working class.

== Background ==
After the March on Rome and the appointment of Benito Mussolini as Prime Minister on 29 October 1922 the Turin labour movement kept on offering resistance to Fascism. The residual working class opposition was shown by the ongoing clandestine production and distribution of the Turin-based Communist newspaper L'Ordine Nuovo, headed by Antonio Gramsci, as well as political, factory, and paramilitary organization, including popular uprisings against Fascist encroachment on working-class neighbourhoods and an important factory election victory.

Another important factor was the rivalry between the paramilitary and political leadership of the local Turin fascio. Once in government Mussolini sought to contain the violent excesses of local squadrismo led by Cesare Maria De Vecchi. The Turin's Fascists became increasingly angered by Mussolini's tendency to collude with local economic and political elites and police chiefs in marginalizing the leader of Turinese and Piedmontese squadrismo, De Vecchi and his right-hand man Piero Brandimarte. Fascism's increasingly prominent political position at the national level required stricter discipline from Fascists to prevent disaffection of its more liberal and squeamish backers.

== The massacre ==
The initial pretext for the large-scale offensive against the labour movement in Turin was the killing of two fascists, Giuseppe Dresda and Lucio Bazzani, in the Barriera di Nizza, by the communist militant and tram worker Francesco Prato, on the night of 17–18 December 1922. In revenge, fascists raided and burned down the Camera del lavoro, the trade union headquarters, and attacked two clubs of the Italian Socialist Party. This was followed by the destruction of the Turin-based Communist newspaper L'Ordine Nuovo. A number of the editors were taken to the central park in Turin and were threatened with execution by Fascist squads.

The fascists rounded up communists and trade unionists in the city and executed a number of them in gruesome manners with one victim, Pietro Ferrero, being tied and dragged behind a truck until he died and another victim being bludgeoned to death. Officially, eleven people were killed and ten were seriously wounded by the Fascists. In 1924, Brandimarte declared to the Il Popolo di Roma newspaper that he had chosen 24 "subversives" from his lists and "entrusted them to our best squads to do justice. And justice was done. The dead were 22, because two escaped shooting."

== Aftermath ==
Brandimarte was arrested in May 1945 after the fall of the Fascist regime. He was indicted for the murders in Turin but the case was transferred to Florence. Five years later he was sentenced to 26 years and three months in jail, although he denied having organized the massacre. In April 1952, the Bologna Court of Appeals absolved him because of insufficient evidence. In 1946, a plaque with the names of the 11 victims was on the Piazza 18 dicembre 1922.

== See also ==
- Fascist and anti-Fascist violence in Italy (1919–1926)
