= Fascio =

Italian word

Fascio (Italian: [ˈfaʃʃo]; pl.: fasci) is an Italian word literally meaning 'bundle' or 'sheaf', and figuratively 'league', and which was used in the late 19th century to refer to political groups of many different (and sometimes opposing) orientations. A number of nationalist fasci later evolved into the 20th century Fasci movement, which became known as fascism.

== Origin ==
During the 19th century the bundle of rods, in Latin called fascis and in Italian fascio, came to symbolise strength through unity, the point being that whilst each independent rod was fragile, as a bundle they were strong. By extension, the word fascio came into modern Italian political usage to mean group, union, band or league. It was first used in this sense in the 1870s by groups of revolutionary democrats in Sicily, to describe themselves. The most famous of these groups was the Fasci Siciliani during 1891–94. Thereafter, the word retained revolutionary connotations. It was these connotations which made it attractive, for example, to young nationalists who demanded Italian intervention in World War I. The fasci they formed were scattered over Italy, and it was to one of these spontaneously created groups, devoid of party affiliations, that Benito Mussolini belonged to.

== History ==
=== World War I ===
On 18 August 1914 Italian syndicalist Alceste de Ambris, speaking from the rostrum of the Milanese Syndical Union (USM), began a ferocious attack against neutrality in World War I and urged intervention against German reaction and the necessity of aiding France and the United Kingdom. He equated the war with the French Revolution.

This caused a deep split within the Italian Syndicalist Union (USI). The majority opted for neutrality. The Parma Labor Chamber, the USM, and other radical syndicalists left the USI and on 1 October 1914 founded the Fasci d'Azione rivoluzionaria internazionalista. On October 5 Angelo Oliviero Olivetti published his manifesto in the first issue of a new series of Pagine libere. Benito Mussolini shortly thereafter joined this group and took leadership.

==== Mussolini's split ====
On 11 December 1914 Mussolini started a political group, Fasci d'Azione Rivoluzionaria, which was a fusion of two other movements: the above group, Fasci d'azione rivoluzionaria internazionalista and a previous group he started called the Fasci autonomi d'azione rivoluzionaria.

This new group was also referred to as the Milan fascio, of which Mussolini was the leader. 24 January 1915 was the turning point in the history of the fasci as their leaders met in Milan and formed a national organization.

=== After World War I ===
In 1919, after the war had ended, Mussolini reconstituted the Milan fascio, using the new name Fasci Italiani di Combattimento. Other fasci of the same name were created, with the common goal of opposing all those—including the king and state—whose specific leanings were deemed to be depriving Italy of the fruits of victory in the war. According to H. W. Schneider, the new Milan fascio was formed of roughly the same people who had been members of the older fascio in 1915, but with a new name and a new objective.

=== After World War II ===
In Italy, after World War II, the term fascio is used as a pejorative for neo-fascista.
