= Italian Labour Union (1918–1925) =

- Unione Italiana del Lavoro
- Abbreviation: UIL
- Formation: 9 July 1918
- Dissolved: 1925
- Headquarters: Piazza San Sepolcro, Milan
- Leader: Alceste De Ambris; Edmondo Rossoni; Luigi Ciardi

The Italian Labour Union (Italian: Unione Italiana del Lavoro, UIL) was an Italian national syndicalist trade union, active between 1918 and 1925. It is not to be confused with the current homonymous trade union established in 1950, which has no connection nor continuity with it, if not in the name.

== History ==
The UIL was established on 9 July 1918 by former members of the Unione Sindacale Italiana (USI), who had been expelled from USI's ranks due to their support for Italy's entry into World War I. It absorbed the Comitato sindacale italiano of Alceste De Ambris and the Unione Sindacale Milanese of Edmondo Rossoni. It was established upon a program of "revolutionary conservation" that tried to incorporate class struggle into a national frame.

Its stronghold was among metal workers and peasants in Milan and Parma, but it also held considerable influence among Republican workers in Romagna, workers in La Spezia and employees in Rome. It was distinct from other unions for its anti-collectivist and anti-socialist views and for its support for corporatism. It was originally supportive towards the Fasci Italiani di Combattimento of Benito Mussolini.

However, in 1920, the Fasci abandoned their previous left-wing/syncretic views and turned sharply to the right, causing the UIL to become hostile to it and vice-versa. This caused a split in the union, with a minority (led by Rossoni, Michele Bianchi and Sergio Panunzio) joining the Fasci and the majority (led by Alceste and Amilcare De Ambris) that became strongly hostile toward the Fascist movement.

Following Mussolini's rise to power in 1922, the UIL was subjected to harsh persecution by the new government and eventually merged into the General Confederation of Labour (CGL) in the hope of uniting anti-fascist labour forces. CGL itself was banned by the fascist regime in 1927 and its members forced to go into exile. Amilcare De Ambris would eventually return to Italy and join the Fascist regime, while his brother Alceste would remain an anti-fascist for the remainder of its life.

A trade union of the same name was established in 1950 from a split in the Italian General Confederation of Labour (CGIL), but has no connection to the original UIL.
