= Filippo Corridoni =

Italian trade unionist and syndicalist (1887–1915)

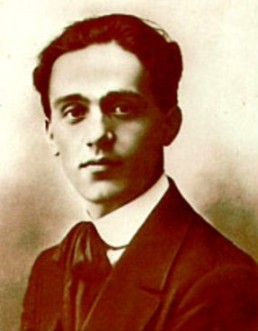
A photo of Corridoni

Filippo Corridoni (19 August 1887 – 23 October 1915) was an Italian trade unionist and syndicalist.

Born in Pausula, today Corridonia, he was a friend of future Italian fascist dictator Benito Mussolini. Between 24 and 25 January 1915, the Fasci d'Azione Rivoluzionaria were founded in the presence of Corridoni and Mussolini, among others. That same year, numerous left-interventionists were called up, including Corridoni and Mussolini themselves. In October 1915, Corridoni died during the Great War, being hit in the head by an Austrian-Hungarian Army bullet at the Trincea delle Frasche ("Trench of the Branches") in San Martino del Carso. Not long before his death, he said: “I will die in a hole, against a rock, or in the fury of an assault; but – if I can – I will fall with my face toward the enemy, as if to go further forward still.”

Between 1914 and 1915, he had been part of the left-interventionism movement that supported the Kingdom of Italy entry into the Great War, and was pictured taking part to a 1915 interventionist demonstration in Milan. This stance costed him, among others, the expulsion from the Unione Sindacale Italiana, whose Milanese section he was leading. These went on to join with Futurist interventionism, which was already creating unrest in the squares with Filippo Tommaso Marinetti and Umberto Boccioni.
