= Angelo Oliviero Olivetti =

Italian politician (1874–1931)

Personal details
- Born: 21 June 1874 Ravenna, Kingdom of Italy
- Died: 17 November 1931 (aged 57) Spoleto, Kingdom of Italy
- Occupation: Lawyer; journalist; political activist

Angelo Oliviero Olivetti (21 June 1874 – 17 November 1931) was an Italian lawyer, journalist, and political activist.

Olivetti was born in Ravenna, Italy. In 1892, while a student at the University of Bologna, he joined the Italian Socialist Party. Following accusations of subversive activity, he fled to Switzerland in 1898. There he eventually met Benito Mussolini. Finding only limited support for his views within the socialist movement, in 1906 he began publishing Pagine Libre, a journal devoted to revolutionary syndicalism. He was expelled from Switzerland in 1912.

On 5 October 1914, Olivetti published the manifesto of the Fascio Rivoluzionario d'Azione Internazionalista. Mussolini shortly thereafter joined and assumed leadership of this Fascio.

In March 1925, Olivetti was one of three Jewish speakers at the Congress of Fascist Culture. He joined the faculty of the University of Perugia in 1931 as professor of political science, and died soon after in Spoleto, Italy, in the same year, from a heart attack.

Revolutionary syndicalists like Olivetti sought to change society while preserving the nation. Mussolini combined this syndicalism with strains of nationalism into his fascism.

== See also ==
- Alceste De Ambris
- Unione Sindacale Italiana
