= Alceste De Ambris =

Italian journalist and activist (1874–1934)

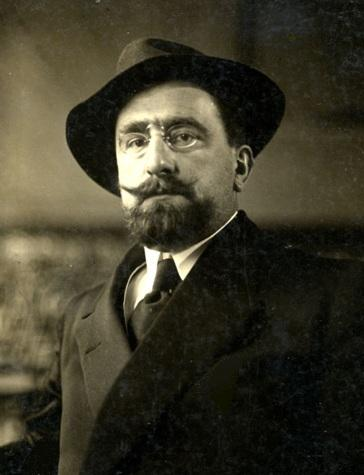
- De Ambris c. 1925–1934

Member of Chamber of Deputies
- In office 27 November 1913 – 19 September 1919
- Constituency: Parma-Modena-Reggio Emilia

Personal details
- Born: 15 September 1874 Licciana Nardi, Italy
- Died: 9 December 1934 (aged 60) Brive, France
- Citizenship: Italian (1874–1926)
- Party: PSI (1892–1914); Fasci (from 1914)

Alceste De Ambris (15 September 1874 – 9 December 1934) was an Italian journalist, socialist activist and syndicalist, considered one of the greatest representatives of revolutionary syndicalism in Italy.

== Early life and involvement with socialism ==
De Ambris was born in Licciana Nardi, a town in the province of Massa-Carrara, as the first of the eight children of Francesco De Ambris and Valeria Ricci. His father was a Mazzinian Republican, and from an early age De Ambris showed an interest in politics. The miserable condition of the Lunigiana workers and their struggles led him to join the socialist movement at the age of 18, becoming a militant and propagandist for the Italian Socialist Party in 1892 and taking part in the formation of numerous socialist circles in his region, especially those in Aulla and La Spezia, of which he was a member.

In 1893, at the age of 19, he enrolled in the law course at the University of Parma and stood out for his participation in the political life of the province, helping to organize the workers movement in the region. De Ambris had some socialist professors at the university and lived in Oltretorrente, the working-class district of Parma. He attended university between 1893 and 1895 but did not graduate because of his political militancy. During this period, he joined the workers and other students of Parma in protests against the Italian colonial wars in Africa, and in 1896 he was targeted by the authorities and accused of defamation in the press.

In 1897, he was called up for compulsory military service in La Spezia, where he tried to desert to join a group of Italian Republicans who went to fight for Greece in the Greco-Turkish War of 1897. De Ambris believed that Greece had established "a community of the free and equal, animated by fraternity and solidarity and capable of sacrifice", representing what he wanted to build in Italy. He used the Greek example in opposition to conservative Italian nationalism, affirming an idea of solidarity with oppressed peoples fighting for freedom. Although some sources claim that De Ambris was arrested for attempted desertion, others claim that he was not punished.

In 1898, he was involved in writing the newspaper La Terra, whose articles denounced the conditions of the peasants of Massa-Carrara, who had almost all their time taken up by work, to which they devoted 10 hours in winter and 15 in summer, on land that was not always fertile. In the same year, a series of popular protests against the rising price of bread took place in Italy. De Ambris was once again called up for military service to suppress the protests, but he did not answer the summons and, to escape arrest, he expatriated clandestinely to France, where he met other Italians fleeing repression. He went to Cannes and then to Marseille, where he worked for a few months in the port and lived with difficulties. The Florence Military Court sentenced him to a year's imprisonment for desertion. De Ambris then left for Brazil.

== His first stay in Brazil and the Avanti! ==
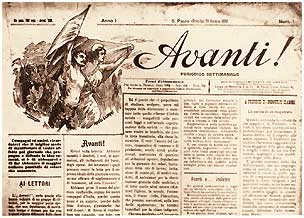
1st edition of Avanti! The periodical was first published in São Paulo on 20 October 1900 and ran until 1919, with some interruptions.

De Ambris arrived in Brazil illegally on a ship from Italy, along with other poor immigrants attracted by the promises of the Brazilian government, which at the time was encouraging European immigration. Alceste initially intended to go to Montevideo, but spent some time in Rio de Janeiro living with his brothers Alfredo and Angelo, who had already been in Brazil since 1894, and was convinced by them to remain in the country. He later settled in São Paulo. Shaken by the torments he saw during the 25-day journey by ship, he decided to study the living and working conditions of the Italian immigrants on the coffee plantations and travelled on one of the trains that took the workers to the plantations, departing from the Hospedaria dos Imigrantes, in Brás, and helped the immigrants to organize themselves into associations and syndicates.

In 1900, he took part in the founding of the socialist newspaper Avanti!, which took its name from its Italian namesake and intended to be an organ at the service of workers and social struggles. The newspaper had a good circulation among the Italian community in São Paulo and, in general, advocated social reforms that could benefit the working class and the formation of workers associations of resistance aimed at improving workers living conditions. Avanti! was one of the first left-wing periodicals to be published in Brazil, and its editors sought to unite their efforts with the various socialist tendencies, so that in the pages of the newspaper there was room for more reformist positions, such as those of Alcebíades Bertolotti, and also for more radical positions, such as those of De Ambris. At the end of September 1901, when the newspaper was about to complete a year in circulation, De Ambris published an article in which he invited workers in Brazil to organize themselves autonomously, claiming that many improvements could be achieved directly through the action and organization of the working class. In the following issue, Bertolotti, in response, argued that workers organizations had the aim of raising wages and improving the lives of the working class, but that this should not lead to the conclusion that economic associations should disregard the role of the state and the party and that workers organizations could not and should not, in a way, exert pressure on them. Despite the polemics, the socialist idea of the need for a trade union for economic struggles and a party for political struggles prevailed in Avanti!. De Ambris himself, at a socialist congress held between 30 May and 2 June 1902, defended electoral action, declaring the need for socialists to register on electoral lists and inviting foreigners to abandon nationalism and become naturalized in order to enjoy the right to vote.

He was also an active member of the Lega Democratica Italiana and the Circolo Socialista Avanti! in the same period, and held several conferences in the city of São Paulo. He also made a number of propaganda trips to the interior of the state, where he helped to found socialist leagues and clubs. On 12 January 1901 Avanti! announced the first efforts to set up a socialist party, and in February, the militants gathered around the newspaper observed with great enthusiasm the strikes that broke out in São Paulo, especially after the strike at the Álvares Penteado textile factory, which spread to other categories. The victory of the strikers at the Penteado textile factory, who were demanding the reinstatement of the old tariff, a reduction in fines and measures to put an end to mistreatment, was seen as a great triumph by the newspaper. De Ambris and Bertolotti, who on behalf of Avanti! acted as intermediaries during the negotiations, went to Brás to tell the strikers about the victory as soon as they heard the news. Avanti! also ran a campaign on behalf of Angelo Longaretti, an Italian peasant who killed the owner of the factory where he worked, Diogo Eugenio Sales, brother of Campos Sales, then President of the Republic of Brazil.

Alceste and his brother Angelo were in São Paulo when they received the news that their mother had died unexpectedly. The editors of Avanti! sent affectionate greetings to both of them. In September 1901, he stepped down as editor of the newspaper, arguing that he wanted to devote more time to propaganda and start work on the Socialist Almanac for 1902, which was published a few months later with texts, portraits and caricatures. This almanac featured an introduction written by De Ambris, a text titled Integral Socialism by the socialist Enrico Ferri, a text on socialism by Estevam Estrella, some poetry and short stories by Giovanni Cena, Raul Pompeia, Edmondo De Amicis and De Ambris himself, titled "La rivolta (scene della vita di fazenda)", which told the story of Angelo Longaretti and the difficulties of rural work, which led this settler to the extreme gesture of murdering the farmer. In 1902, he returned to the management of Avanti! and took part in a socialist congress held between the end of May and the beginning of June that year.

In April 1903, the São Paulo court sentenced him to 4 months and 20 days in prison for defamation through the press against industrialist Nicola Matarazzo. His brother Alfredo, who was a lawyer, defended Alceste during the expulsion process, seeking to have the case reviewed by the Supreme Court in Rio de Janeiro so that the sentence could be overturned. However, given that his conviction for desertion had been amnestied, De Ambris preferred to return to Italy.

== Approximation with revolutionary syndicalism and the Parma strike of 1908 ==
In Brazil, De Ambris became an experienced organizer and a journalist famous for his tenacity and the strength of his polemics. Back in Italy, he went on to hold important positions in syndicalism associations. As soon as he returned, he became secretary of the Chamber of Labor in Savona, Liguria, working mainly with metalworkers. At the end of 1904, he moved from Savona to the secretariat of the National Glassmakers' Federation, based in Livorno, Tuscany, then one of the most militant associations in Italy. Even from a distance, he also coordinated the work of Italian socialists in Brazil and was a correspondent for the newspaper Fanfulla.

During this period, he became close to revolutionary syndicalism, a concept that was gaining strength among the workers and radicalized elements of the Italian Socialist Party, especially after the general strike of 1904, driven by revolutionary syndicalists and radical socialists who were gaining strength in the Parma Chamber of Labor. Commenting on a congress of Italian socialists held in Switzerland in an article for the periodical Fanfulla in 1905, De Ambris noted the strength that this conception was gaining within the Italian Socialist Party. The syndicalist proposals had been defeated, but by a difference of 363 votes against 402 for the reformists. At the end of that year, De Ambris was in Rome and began collaborating with Enrico Leone's Divenire Sociale, La Gioventù Socialista, the organ of the National Socialist Youth Federation, and Il Sindacato Operaio, writing articles that made clear his stance in favor of revolutionary syndicalism, affirming that the trade union was the instrument that would bring about the transformation of society and enable the proletariat to manage power, determining through struggle the transition from the state to the economic organization of the class, and defending the autonomy of syndicates from political parties. For De Ambris, parliamentary socialism had abandoned its proletarian and aggressive character to stagnate in a legalism and "petty bourgeois" humanitarianism with the pretension of representing "general interests", sacrificing the interests of the working class in whose name it had arisen and asserted itself. This process had been going on since 1901, when the Italian Socialist Party began to collaborate with the liberal governments of Giuseppe Zanardelli and Giovanni Giolitti. Revolutionary syndicalism thus appeared as an alternative to reformist socialism.

De Ambris spent a brief period in Bagnone with his father and some of his brothers in 1906, where he gave lectures and collaborated with the newspaper La Terra, which was re-founded that year. He was with his family in Lunigiana when some friends wrote to him in 1907, asking him to take up the post of secretary of the Parma Chamber of Labor. De Ambris enthusiastically accepted the invitation, and in November, he became editor of the periodical L'Internazionale, considered the "great mouthpiece of revolutionary syndicalism". Before his arrival, the Chamber of Labor was still controlled by the reformists, but most of the workers who were part of it had been adopting more radical stances since the 1904 strike. When he took over as general secretary of the organization, the workers movement in the province of Parma was going through a period of crisis, after successive defeats and because of the split between the moderate and radical socialists and between the city and country leagues. The invitation to De Ambris to head the Chamber of Labour was conceived as an attempt to reorganize the movement, given the great prestige he had in the region. Seeking to respond to the workers desire to democratize the unions, De Ambris, as secretary of the Parma Chamber of Labour, tried to create instruments that would guarantee members the possibility of effectively influencing the choices that involved them. Representations and meetings multiplied and referendums were used in the case of the most important decisions, such as whether or not to start a strike. In just a few months, the Chamber's membership grew to 30,000. In addition, De Ambris did his best to avoid political divisions within the union, considering that if the workers considered it useful to launch the organization into the electoral struggle, this decision should be taken unanimously among the workers organized in the Chamber. In 1907, after De Ambris took over as secretary of the Parma Chamber of Labor, the association won some victories over the Agrarian Association, which brought together landowners and tenants in the region.

Under De Ambris's leadership, the Parma Chamber of Labor declared a general strike on 1 May 1908 in response to the owners who were trying to disregard the gains made the previous year, such as the enforcement of contracts, wage increases, better working conditions and the recognition of the right of association. The strike involved around 30,000 workers from various municipalities in the province of Parma. The local bourgeoisie and landowners reacted violently to the movement, clashing with the workers. In the first days of the strike, the Socialist Party, the General Confederation of Labor (CGL) and the National Federation of Agricultural Workers (Federterra) took positions in support of the strikers, but avoided intervening in the conflict. The paralyzed workers, for their part, refused to negotiate with the owners through representatives of the CGL and Federterra, adopting methods of direct action to obtain the improvements and rights they were demanding. After 50 days on strike, the owners hired workers from other regions to replace the strikers. There were clashes around the train station, where some demonstrators tried to prevent the scabs from disembarking. In the working-class district of Oltretorrente, the police clashed with the workers, who declared a general strike. Workers from the countryside also went to the city and there were clashes with the cavalry. The Socialist Party and the CGL tried unsuccessfully to convince the workers not to join the call for a general strike. In the face of the repression that followed the movement, the union headquarters were raided and all those present were arrested. At the end of July, the Agrarian Association made it possible to return to work, and only a few areas remained in turmoil. During this period, De Ambris received the news of the death of his only sister, Irma, at the age of 30.

At the end of the strike, the Parma Royal Prosecutor's Office prosecuted the syndicalists, accusing them of having promoted and attempted an armed insurrection against the state during the strike. De Ambris was accused of being the head of the association and of throwing stones at a policeman from a window. In view of the tension that had built up between workers in the city and the countryside during the months of unrest, the trial was transferred from Parma to Lucca. Among the defense lawyers for the accused syndicalists and workers were Arturo Labriola, Pietro Gori and some socialist deputies. The police themselves, a delegate and a commissioner, ended up defending the strikers, claiming that the movement had no insurrectionary character, but only an economic objective. In May 1909, all the accused were acquitted and released. The prosecuted syndicalists and workers were welcomed with parties in Parma, where people carried portraits of Alceste De Ambris, Giuseppe Garibaldi and Jesus Christ.

== The second time in Brazil and La Scure ==
De Ambris managed to avoid arrest during the repression that followed the Parma strike and left for Switzerland in July 1908. From there, he went to France, where he took part with Edmondo Rossoni, Pulvio Zocchi and Ottavio Dinale in the 10th Congress of the Confédération Générale du Travail (CGT), held in October 1908. He then traveled to Brazil for the second time, invited by Vitaliano Rotellini to run the newspaper La Tribuna Italiana, guaranteeing respect for his ideas and principles. Rotellini sent the money for the voyage, and De Ambris arrived in Brazil at the end of 1908.

De Ambris remained at the helm of La Tribuna Italiana for ten months, receiving criticism from Italian industrialists based in São Paulo and anarchist militants, who denounced his complicity with the "bourgeois press". When Rotellini decided to control De Ambris's direction of the newspaper, he left the paper and, in 1910, founded La Scure, whose first issue came out in April. Noticing the demobilization of the São Paulo workers movement, he gave the newspaper a direction that would bring together all groups with a democratic tendency, who defended the political rights of citizens, freedom to organize and strike, freedom of expression and the press. It declared itself to be the only Italian-language newspaper published in Brazil that was absolutely independent and free of any interest or party ties, criticizing the consular and diplomatic representatives maintained by Italy in Brazil and its institutions, such as the Chamber of Commerce, the Dante Alighieri school and the Colonial Institute, controlled by conservative monarchists.

As well as running La Scure, De Ambris made a series of propaganda trips to the interior of the state of São Paulo, giving talks in Campinas, Ribeirão Preto, Jardinópolis, Sertãozinho, Jaboticabal, Araraquara, São Carlos, Bauru, São Manuel and Botucatu, where he spoke on topics such as mutualism, resistance, cooperation and syndicalism.

In the issue of 21 May 1910 La Scure announced that, for work reasons, De Ambris was going to Rio de Janeiro, where he would only stay for a few weeks. However, he ended up staying in Rio for longer, where he continued to write La Scure and worked at the Havas Information Agency. During his time in Rio, he joined a group of bohemian writers that included Olavo Bilac, and even wrote a novel, which was published in chapters in São Paulo's Avanti!. After his stay in Rio de Janeiro and shaken by the death of his brother Alfredo from yellow fever, De Ambris left for France in 1911.

== Return to Italy, participation in the First World War and Fiume expedition ==
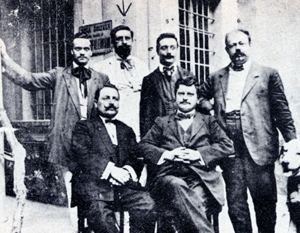
Filippo Corridoni, Alceste De Ambris, Tullio Masotti, Pulvio Zocchi, Alberto Meschi and Giuseppe Di Vittorio, the founders of the Unione Sindacale Italiana (USI) in 1912.

On arriving in Europe, De Ambris was in Lugano, Switzerland, between 1911 and 1912, from where he took over the management of L'Internazionale. Shortly before returning to Italy, he entered into controversy with syndicalists in favor of the Libyan War, in particular Arturo Labriola. While Labriola tried to justify the colonial war as an economic and national necessity, accusing the syndicalists against it of being in agreement with the reformists, De Ambris accused Labriola and the pro-war syndicalists of being in agreement with Prime Minister Giolitti, the king, the bankers, the army and the Vatican. For him, national syndicalism that tried to identify the interests of the proletariat with those of militarism "was already condemned to death". Faced with the controversy caused between pro-war and anti-war syndicalists, a bloc formed with the Parma group that was inclined to split from the CGL and form a new syndicalist body. Although a considerable part of the syndicalism movement considered it important to save the unity of the workers organization, the advocates of separation reached a consensus throughout 1912, which was consummated in November with the creation of the Unione Sindacale Italiana (USI), which was initially joined by 80,000 workers. Alceste De Ambris was one of its leaders.

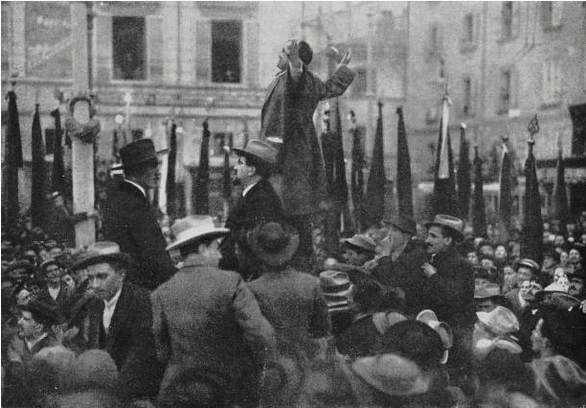
Alceste De Ambris, center, speaking at a socialist rally in Parma in 1913.

In October 1913, he was elected to the Italian parliament by popular plebiscitary vote in the Electoral College of Parma–Reggio Emilia–Modena for the Italian Socialist Party for a term that would last until September 1919. With parliamentary immunity, he was able to return to Italy, where he was welcomed by a crowd in Parma. During his term, he devoted himself above all to syndicalist organization. In 1914, after the death of three anti-militarist demonstrators, insurrections broke out across much of Italy for a week, which became known as "Red Week". In several regions, public buildings were stormed and telegraph and railway lines were sabotaged. Anarchists, communists, socialists, liberals, republicans and syndicalists took part in the unrest. Alceste De Ambris called on the workers of Parma to sell their bicycles and buy revolvers. However, the failure of the movement discouraged De Ambris, who was disillusioned by the unpreparedness of the workers and the revolutionary forces. Regretting the disputes between the various left-wing currents, he began to support a federalist and republican program that could bring together all the progressive forces. His project, however, received criticism from all sides, especially the syndicalists, who saw it as a move away from De Ambris.

With the outbreak of the First World War, the leading group of the USI decided to support the military efforts of the Allies against the Central Powers. De Ambris was one of the most determined supporters of interventionism; he engineered the split within the Milanese Syndical Union (USM) through his 18 August 1914 public speech, arguing that interventionism was in favor of the fundamental freedoms of Western democratic nations, and was followed by Filippo Corridoni. In response to De Ambris broaching the subject of war, Corridoni, who was imprisoned at the time, said: "Yes, the war is a national and revolutionary duty. Yes, we have to want it and wage it, as soon as Italy enters the field..."

As a partisan of national syndicalism, he believed the war to represent an opportunity equal to the impact of the French Revolution, and took his supporters (USM and Parma Labor Chamber) out of the Unione Sindacale Italiana to found the Fasci d'Azione Rivoluzionaria Internazionalista. The manifesto of the new movement attracted Benito Mussolini, who led his own movement, the Fasci Autonomi d'Azione Rivoluzionaria, into a merger that gave birth to Fasci d'Azione Rivoluzionaria. The pro-war leaders and factions ended up abandoning the USI, whose secretariat passed to the anarchist Armando Borghi. In 1918, the syndicalists who had left the USI formed the Unione Italiana del Lavoro (UIL), which aimed to unite workers who wanted to develop their action independently of any political party and taking into account the general conditions of development and freedom in Italy, stating that they should not renounce their homeland, "but conquer it by radically renewing its institutions". This organization was initially supported by De Ambris, and Edmondo Rossoni was its secretary. Many of the UIL's leaders and militants, including Rossoni, converted to fascism. In the same year, in co-authorship with the poet Filippo Tommaso Marinetti he wrote the Manifesto of the Italian Fasces of Combat.

When Italy entered the war, De Ambris enlisted as a volunteer, believing that the conflict could trigger a revolutionary transformation. The Russian Revolution of 1917 seemed to confirm his thesis, and he said that, like Russia, Italy could rid itself of "foreigners, tyrants, the temporal power of the popes" and "carry out all the most daring political and social liberations". At the end of the war, he became close to the poet Gabriele D'Annunzio, accompanying him on the expedition to Fiume. The city was the subject of a dispute between Italy and Yugoslavia, and in September 1919, some rebel military sectors, with some groups of volunteers, under the command of D'Annunzio, occupied Fiume, which was under international control, and declared its annexation to Italy. De Ambris was one of D'Annunzio's political advisors and was responsible for the constitution of Fiume, the so-called Carnaro Charter.

Flag of the Italian Regency of Carnaro, bearing the mythical snake Ouroboros.

De Ambris's text for the constitution of the so-called Italian Regency of Carnaro guaranteed freedoms of thought, the press, assembly, association, civil equality between the sexes, the secular character of the state, universal secret, direct and proportional voting, the possibility of revoking the offices of those invested with public functions, free schools, social security and considered property to be a social function, not an individual right or privilege. All citizens, including women, had to do military service. The regime installed in Fiume was to be a direct democracy based on productive work, with local and functional autonomy as its organic criterion. Another striking feature of the Carta del Carnaro was corporatism. Fiume's constitution stated that all citizens who contributed to the material prosperity and civil development of the Republic through continuous manual and intellectual work were considered productive citizens and had to be compulsorily enrolled in guilds of workers, farmers, merchants, administrators, civil servants, teachers and liberal professionals. The guilds were to have full autonomy in terms of their organization and internal workings. Because of its corporatism, some historians have established a link between the Carta del Carnaro and fascism. However, other researchers see it as a kind of synthesis of the concepts adopted by De Ambris during his socialist and syndicalist activism. The draft constitution was approved by D'Annunzio on 18 March 1920. The English and French workers' organizations saw Fiume's expedition as an imperialist undertaking and called on Italian workers to boycott. The UIL, influenced by De Ambris, however, declared its support for Fiume's enterprise. Other left-wing leaders showed some sympathy for Fiume. Antonio Gramsci, who distrusted D'Annunzio, considered that his movement had appreciable popular elements, and Lenin advised an alliance of the Soviet Union with Carnaro's Italian Regency.

In addition to drafting the Fiume constitution, De Ambris was also the secretary for civil affairs of the Liberation Army Command and was appointed chief of staff of the Dannunzian command on 10 June 1920. He worked to disrupt relations between the Fiume legionnaires and the fascists, seeking the support of the workers movement. After the Treaty of Rapallo and the repression of the Fiume expedition on 24 December 1920, De Ambris tried to keep the former legionaries together, trying to prevent them from falling under fascist and nationalist influence. However, D'Annunzio himself ended up converting to fascism.

== Exile and last years ==
De Ambris had collaborated with Benito Mussolini during the war and for a brief period afterwards. However, he never joined the Fasci di Combattimento and soon took a clearly anti-fascist stance, associating with Arditi del Popolo. With the rise of fascism, De Ambris took part in the clashes between the workers of Parma and Italo Balbo's fascist squads in August 1922. On 20 December 1922 he was violently removed from the streetcar he was on in Genoa, beaten up and taken to the police station, accused of anti-fascist incitement. After this, he went into exile in France, together with his partner Maria, her daughter and her husband. Mussolini still tried to convince him to collaborate with fascism between 1923 and 1924, but De Ambris refused.

In his last exile, he lived in poverty and worked as a bookseller. He soon became involved in the anti-fascist activities carried out by other Italian exiles, taking part in the Lega Italiana dei Diritti dell'Uomo (LIDU), together with Luigi Campolonghi, his long-time companion. The organization dealt with helping new arrivals obtain documents and jobs, as well as helping exiles threatened with expulsion and serving as a forum for discussion. De Ambris also founded the weekly Il Mezzogiorno in Toulouse and was a contributor to the newspaper Il Corriere degli Italiani, where he published various writings against fascism. In 1926, he wrote a brochure in which he commented on the case of the murder of the socialist deputy Giacomo Matteotti, highlighting Mussolini's responsibility for the murder with documents and arguing that "it was shameful to tolerate Italy being governed dictatorially by a murderer and that the disgust aroused by this shame should find the will and the strength to eliminate it". In September of the same year, De Ambris lost his Italian citizenship because of his anti-fascist activities. Between 1927 and 1934, he maintained constant correspondence with his niece Irma. In many of his letters, he wrote under a false name, as he was constantly under surveillance by the fascist government and his correspondence was often intercepted.

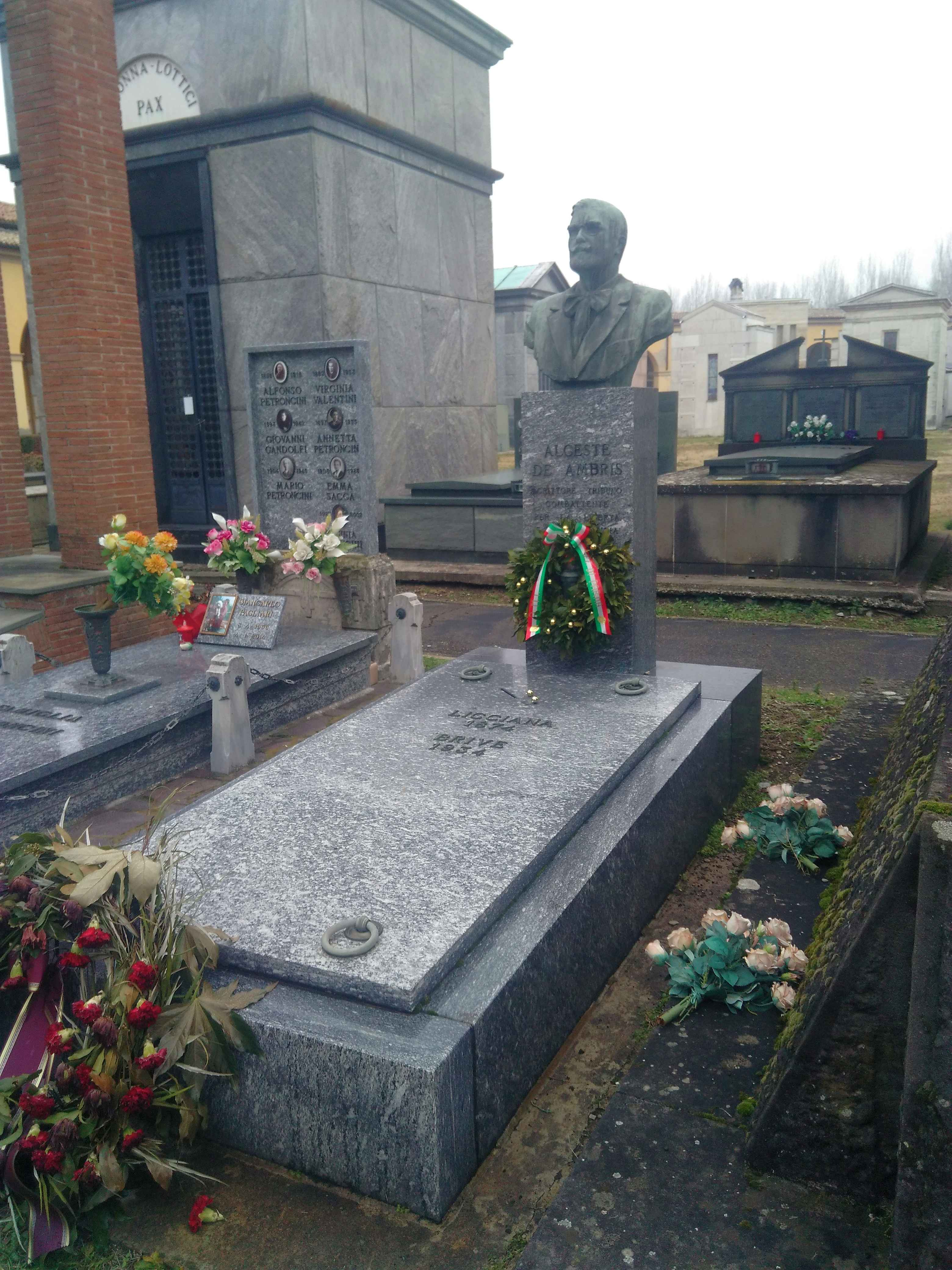
Tomb of Alceste De Ambris.

On 9 December 1934 De Ambris invited a group of friends to his home to discuss a work plan for the LIDU, bringing together anarchists, socialists and Italian republicans in exile. A few hours after the meeting, he died. The Paris newspaper Le Peuple reported his death on 13 December 1934. On the tomb that the Parma workers built for De Ambris in the Brive-la-Gaillarde cemetery, Campolonghi wrote the following epigraph:

Alceste De Ambris. Writer. Orator. Fighter. Heroic conductor of crowds. Licciana 1874 - Brive 1934. He refused comfort and bent over misery to console and redeem it. Born an Italian, he died a citizen of the world. A wandering knight of the ideal, he remained in exile here, where the stone that protects his body cries out in his name love for rebels, hatred for tyrants.

In 1964, his remains were taken from France to the Della Villetta cemetery in Italy, with celebrations being held in the city of Parma, attended by local authorities and syndicalist organizations.

== Works ==
- L'Argentina e L'Emigrazione Italiana (1911)
- La questione di Fiume (1920)
- Filippo Corridoni (profilo) (1922) [Translated into English as Filippo Corridoni, Sunny Lou Publishing, ISBN 978-1-95539-280-8 2025]

== Bibliography ==
- De Felice, Renzo (1966). Sindacalismo rivoluzionario e fiumanesimo nel carteggio De Ambris-D'Annunzio (in Italian). Brescia: Morcelliana.
- Furiozzi, Gian Bagio (1977). Il sindacalismo rivoluzionario italiano (in Italian). Milão: Mursia. ISBN 978-8842593560.
- Gestri, Lorenzo (1977). "Note bibliographiche, appunti provvisori, un testo e un documento per servire ad una biografia di Alceste de Ambris". Cronaca e storia di Val di Magra. VI: 181–232.
- Sereni, Umberto (1979). Il processo ai sindacalisti parmensi (Lucca, aprile-maggio 1909) (in Italian). Lucca: Pacini.
- Toledo, Edilene (2004). Travessias revolucionárias: Idéias e militantes sindicalistas em São Paulo e na Itália (1890-1945). Campinas: Editora UNICAMP. ISBN 9788526806931.
