= Tresigallo =

- Comune
- Comune di Tresigallo
- Coat of arms

- Location within Italy Location within Emilia-Romagna
- Coordinates: 44°49′N 11°54′E
- Country: Italy
- Region: Emilia-Romagna
- Province: Province of Ferrara (FE)

Government
  - Mayor: Maurizio Barbirati

Area
  - Total: 20 km^{2} (7.7 sq mi)
- Elevation: 4 m (13 ft)

Population (31 May 2007)
  - Total: 4,662
  - Density: 230/km^{2} (600/sq mi)
- Time zone: UTC+1 (CET)
  - Summer (DST): UTC+2 (CEST)
- Postal code: 44039
- Dialing code: 0533
- Website: Official website

Tresigallo (Ferrarese: Trasgàl) is an Italian municipality in the province of Ferrara, which is in the region of Emilia-Romagna. It has about 4,700 inhabitants.

Despite its medieval origins, to which only a 16th-century palace (Palazzo Pio) of the House of Este bears witness today, it was transformed by the Fascist Minister of Agriculture Edmondo Rossoni, who was born in Tresigallo in 1884. From his ministry in Rome, he developed and supervised the new village map, completely rebuilding it as a utopian city from 1927 to 1934. Two axes were drawn across the town in order to link the main aspects of everyday life: on the horizontal axis there was the Church (spirituality) and the Balilla House, a youth center, renamed Casa della G.I.L (Gioventù Italiana del Littorio); on the vertical axis there was the civic centre (everyday life) and the cemetery (memory).

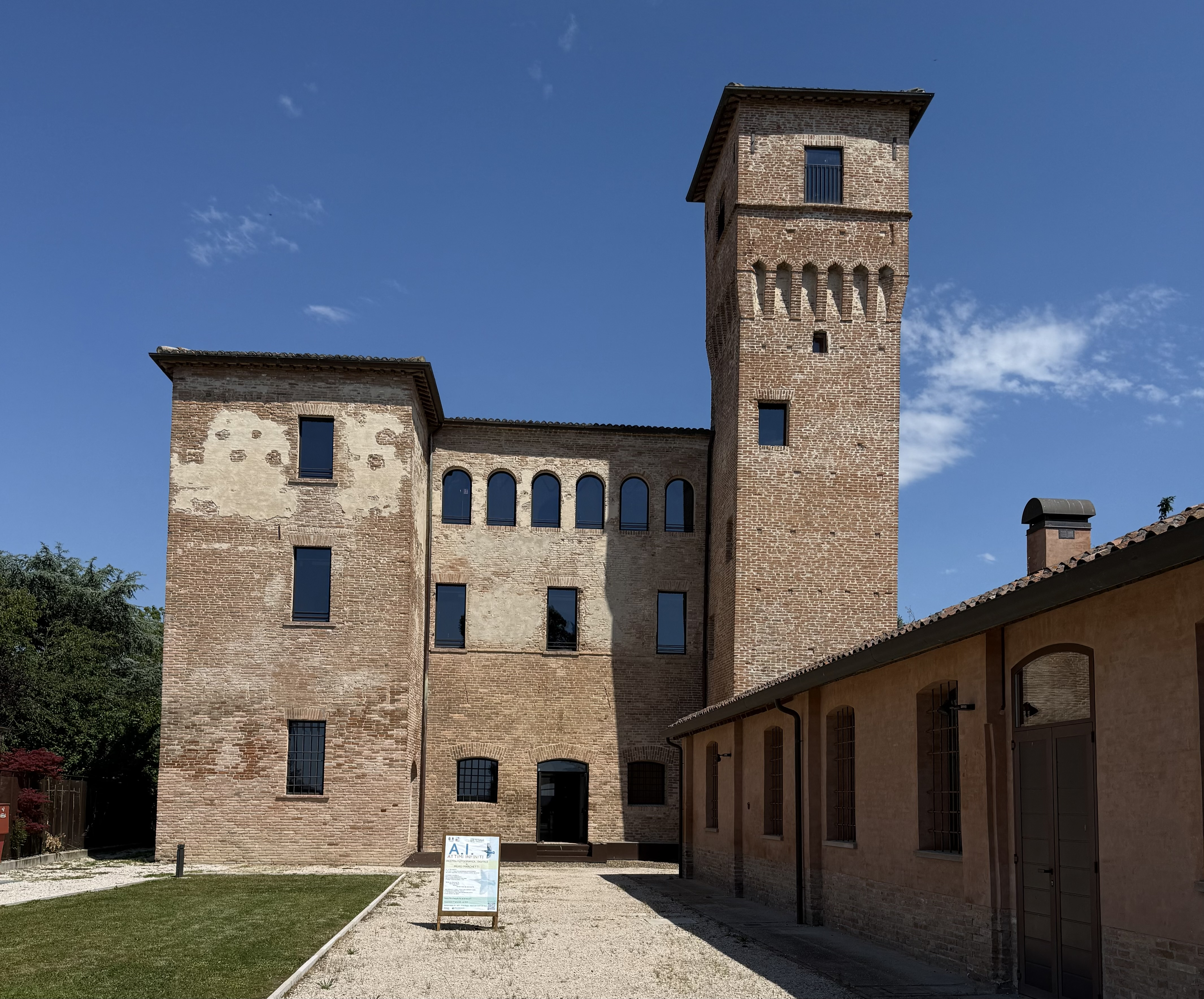
Palazzo Pio

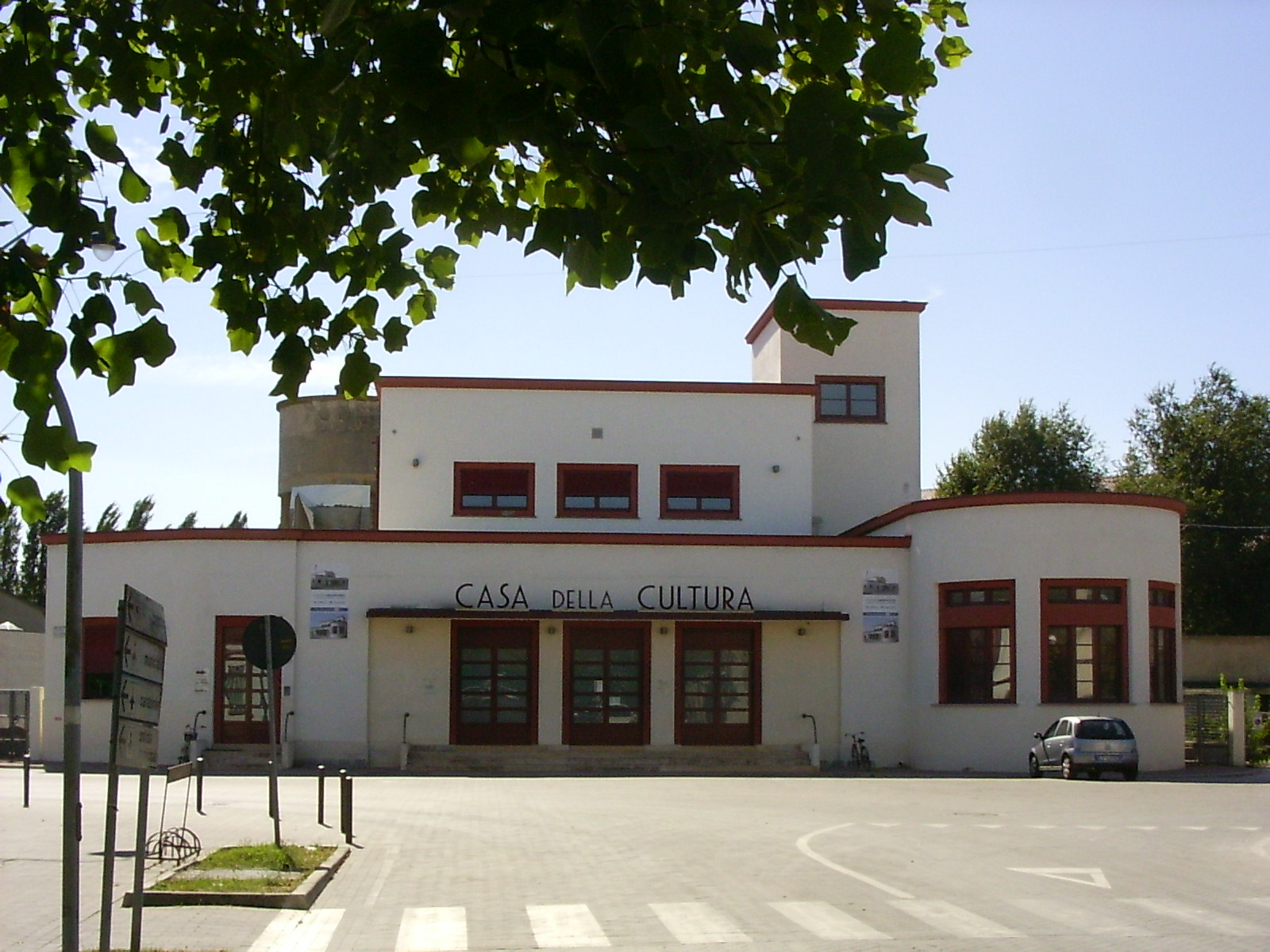
House of Culture

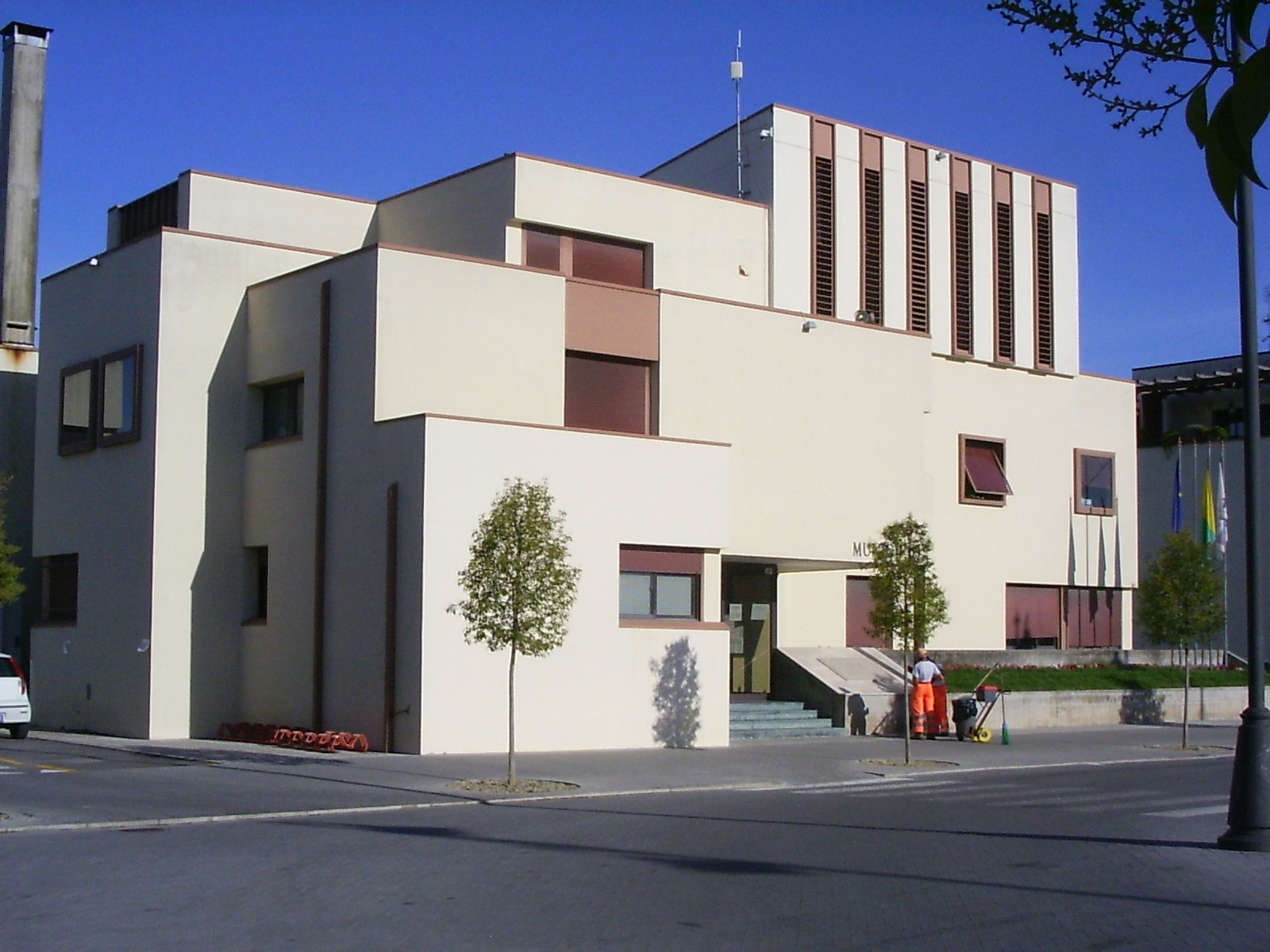
Town hall

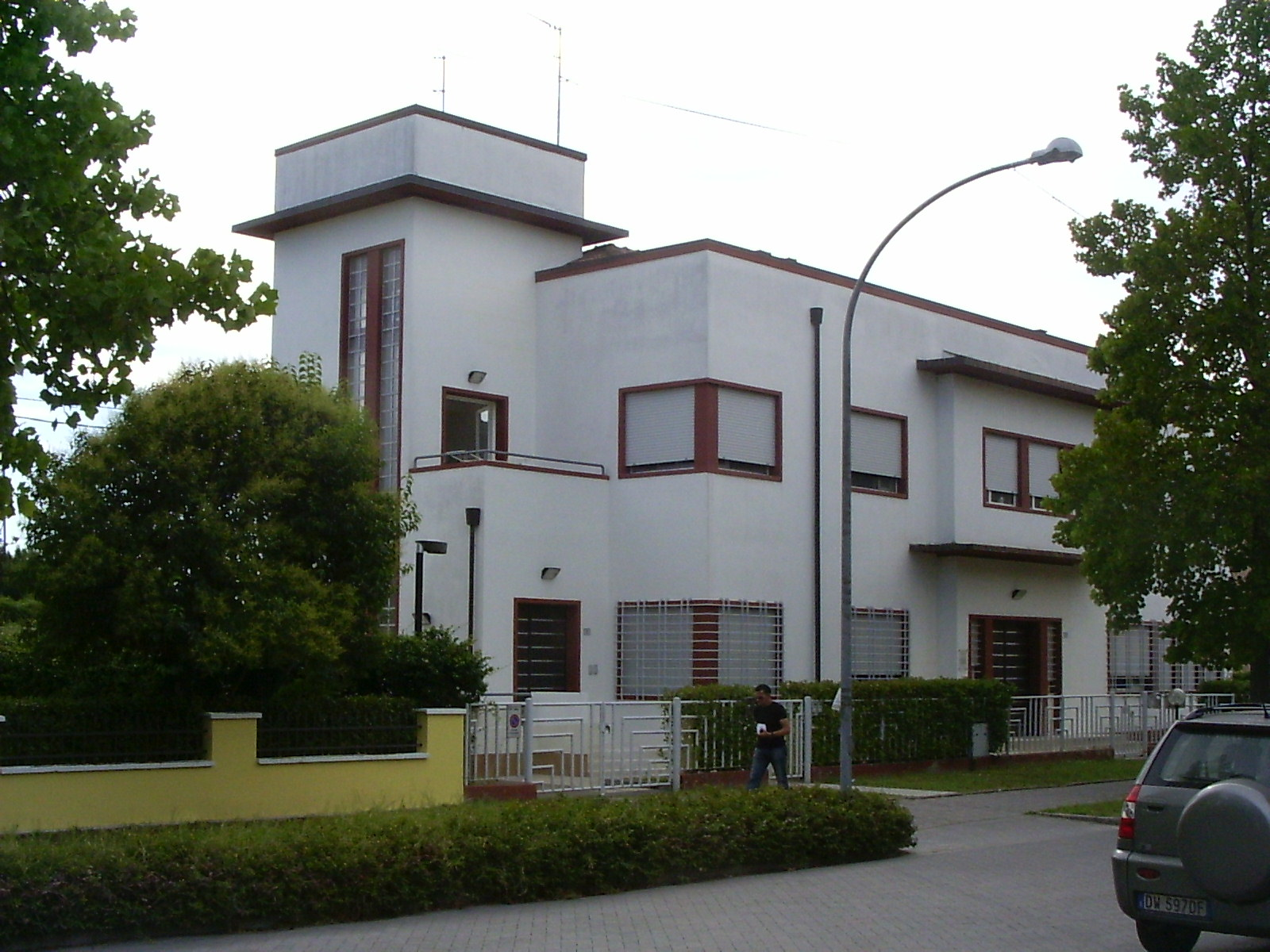
Former police

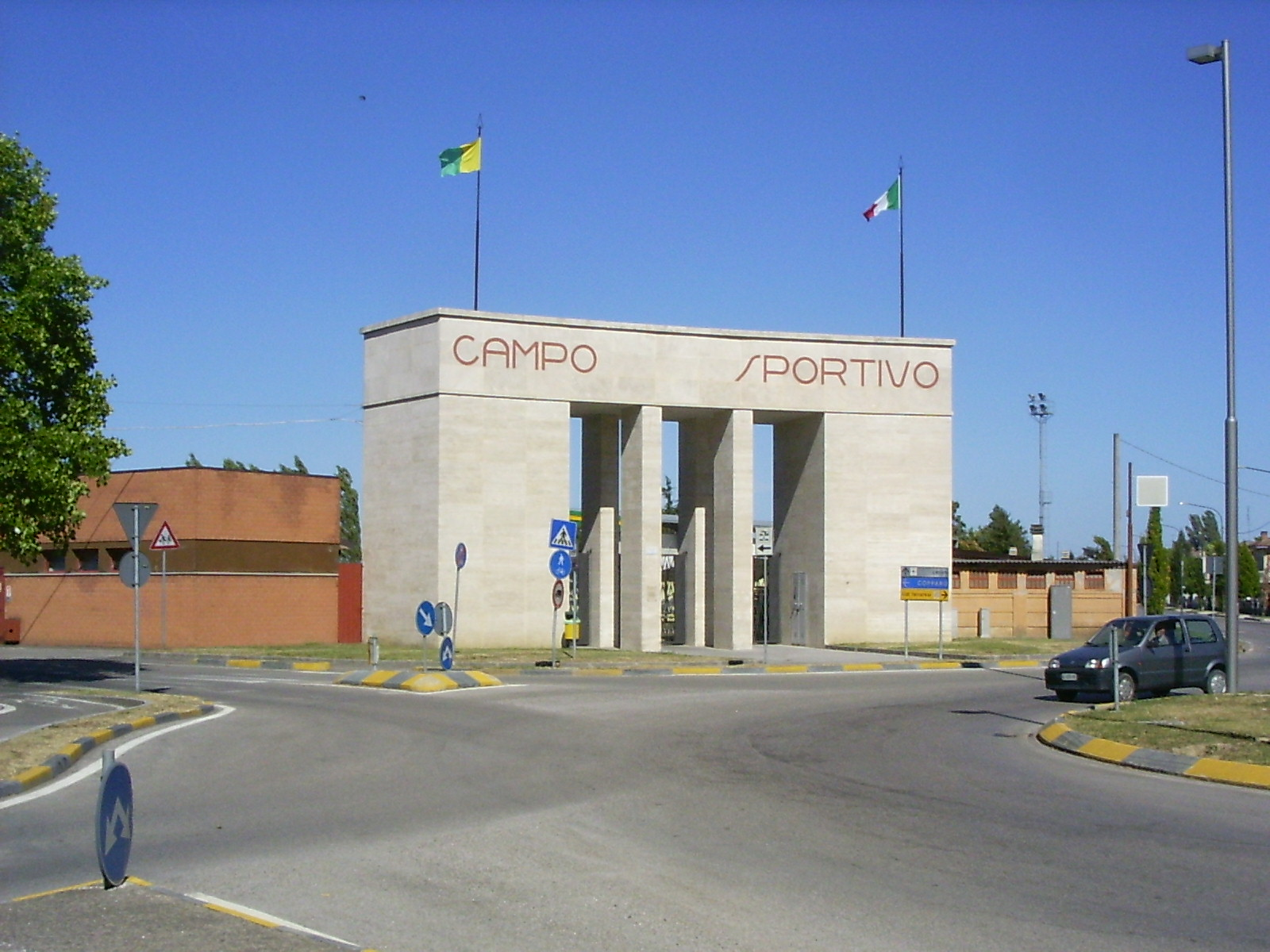
Entrance to the sports complex

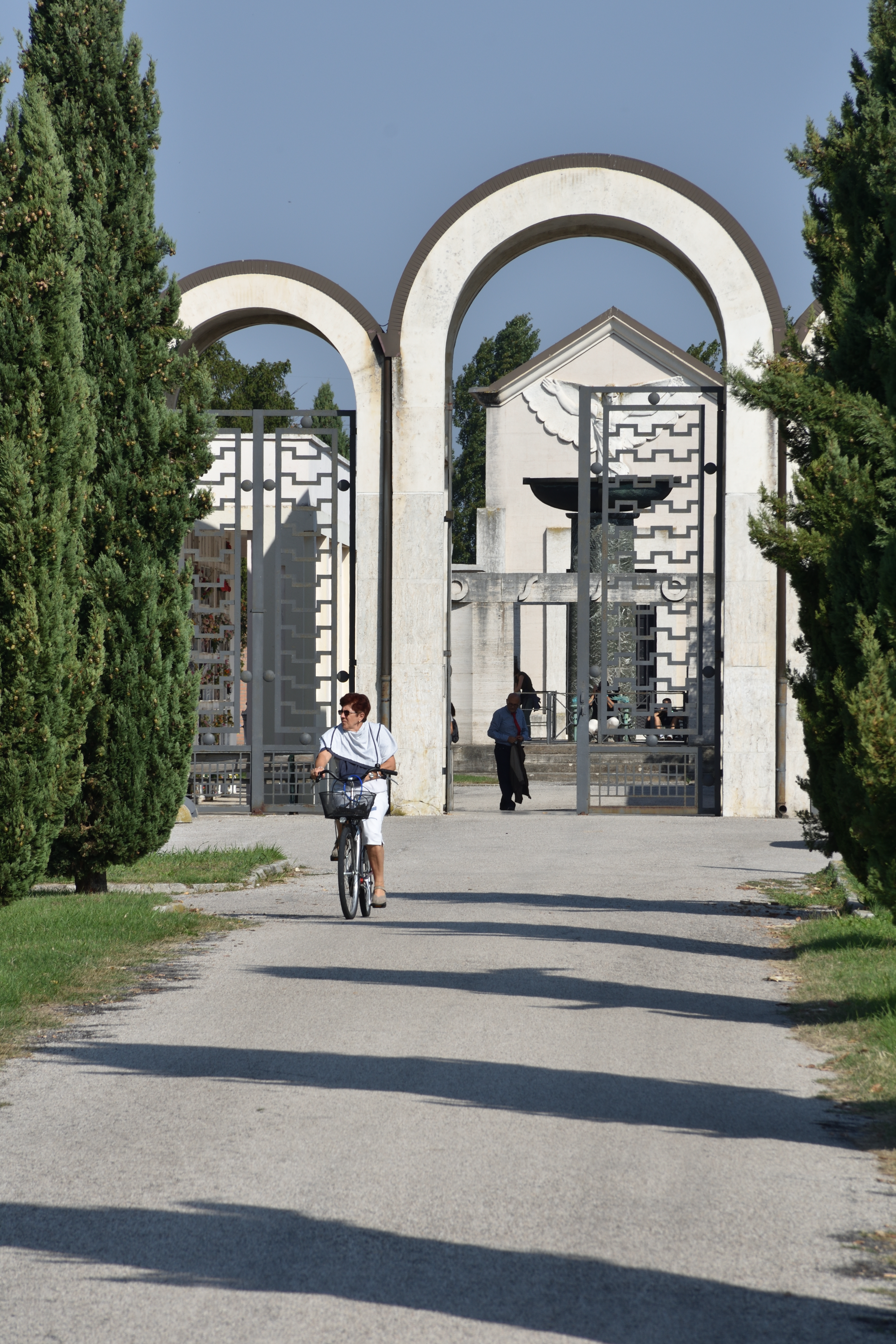
Cemetery
