= Renato Mondolfo =

Italian philatelist

- Born: 10 February 1918
- Died: 2 February 1992 (aged 73)

Renato Mondolfo (10 February 1918 - 2 February 1992) was an Italian philatelist who signed the Roll of Distinguished Philatelists in 1984.
