= Edmondo Rossoni =

Italian politician (1884–1965)

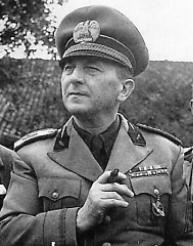

Minister of Agriculture and Forestry
- In office January 24, 1935 – October 31, 1939
- Prime Minister: Benito Mussolini
- Preceded by: Giacomo Acerbo
- Succeeded by: Giuseppe Tassinari

Member of the Italian Chamber of Deputies
- In office May 24, 1924 – August 5, 1943
- Constituency: At-large

Personal details
- Born: May 6, 1884 Tresigallo, Italy
- Died: June 8, 1965 (aged 81) Rome, Italy
- Party: PSI (1903–1915); FIC (1915–1921); PNF (1921–1943)
- Profession: Trade unionist, journalist

Edmondo Rossoni (May 6, 1884 – June 8, 1965) was a revolutionary syndicalist leader and an Italian fascist politician who became involved in the fascist syndicalist movement during Benito Mussolini's regime.

== Early life ==
Born to a working-class family in Tresigallo, a small town in the Province of Ferrara, Rossoni was imprisoned in 1908 for his revolutionary activities as a syndicalist. After leaving Italy in 1910 and arriving in the United States, Rossoni began to work with Bill Haywood as an organizer for the Industrial Workers of the World union (IWW), and edited the revolutionary syndicalist newspaper Il Proletario (The Proletarian), which by 1912 was the Italian-language newspaper of the IWW. In 1911, Rossoni gained some notoriety in the United States after he spat on an Italian flag at a New York demonstration. Seeing how poorly Italian immigrant workers were treated in the United States by capitalists and other revolutionary cadre, he returned to Italy at the outbreak of World War I with the purpose of "fusing nationalism with class struggle", and volunteered for military service in the war.

== Political career ==
Determined to merge socialism with nationalism, Rossoni joined Benito Mussolini's Italian fascist movement in 1921. After the March on Rome, he continued his political activities and became a major political force in Mussolini's administration until 1943.

Along with Alfredo Rocco and Giuseppe Bottai, Rossoni is considered to have played a large role in the development of Italy's Fascist State. His program of corporativismo integrale was seen as a "cosmetically altered version of sindacalismo integrale" that was to assist in the transformation of Italy into a "Fascist syndicate" state. Regarded as one of the founders of “Fascist syndicalism”, Rossoni had learned in the United States to distrust both the capitalists and various orthodox socialist movements that urged internationalism, recalling his conversion to social nationalism at the first congress of Fascist unions in June 1922:

"We have seen our workers exploited and held in low regard not only by the capitalists but also by the revolutionary comrades of other countries. We therefore know from experience how internationalism is nothing but fiction and hypocrisy."

One of Rossoni's first syndicalist ventures in Italy was helping to found the Unione Italiana del Lavoro (UIL) in June 1918. With some support of Mussolini’s Italian Fasces, he led the occupation of the Franchi e Gregorini steelworks plant in Dalmine in March 1919 under the tricolor Italian flag in contrast to the red flag.

== Fascist syndicates in Italy ==
Considered a firebrand on labor and corporatist issues, Rossoni became the secretary-general of the Confederation of National Syndicates in January 1922, which went through a series of merges and negotiations and ended up renamed the General Confederation of Fascist Syndical Corporations by December 1922. He also helped launch a Fascist trade union journal in March 1922, Il lavoro d’Italia, which was renamed Il lavoro fascista in the wake of Rossoni’s reorganization of the fascist syndicate movement in 1928.

With state backing, Rossoni greatly expanded membership in the Fascist Syndicate, where membership rose from 250,000 to 1.8 million between 1920 and 1924, surpassing every other labor organization. By 1924 Rossoni’s Fascist Syndicate had even more members than the National Fascist Party, which claimed only 650,000 members. The high numbers of members alarmed Fascist party leaders who were determined to keep Rossoni’s power somehow checked.

Seeking to control the revolutionary direction of Fascist movement, Rossoni made it clear that Fascist syndicalism should be at the forefront, proclaiming in Mussolini’s Il Popolo d'Italia newspaper that “only the Fascist syndicates could complete the revolution.”. Considering as partisans of “left fascism,” Rossoni and his cadre of Fascist Syndicates sought “labor’s autonomy and class consciousness.” Such advocacy worried industrialists and the business community, particularly Rossoni’s interpretation of Marx’s “dynamic law of history,” which induced him to advocate eventual workers’ control of factories. He took the position that “industrialists had the right to occupy their positions only till such time as workers, organized into new syndicates, had mastered the requisite competence to take command.” In early 1922, Rossoni claimed that capitalism “depressed and annulled production rather than stimulating and developing it” and that industrialists were “apathetic, passive, and ignorant.”

Many Fascist trade union leaders, including Rossoni, “had dedicated their lives to class struggle,” and were increasingly looked upon with consternation by industrialists and the Confindustria (Italian employers' federation and national chamber of commerce).

By April 1923, the conflict between industrialists and Rossoni’s Fascist syndicates had become so contentious that a circle of industrialists questioned themselves on whether it was “now wise to pay the Communists to fight the Fascists!” A month later, the future Italian Communist leader Palmiro Togliatti wrote a letter to Moscow, informing them that the "industrial classes are rather wary of the new regime, fearing unpredictable developments in the class struggle with Fascist syndicates." As the hostilities continued, Rossoni by 1926 was referring to the industrialists as "vampires" and "profiteers."

For Rossoni, fascism was nothing less than "The great revolution of the twentieth Century: a revolution which in its subsequent development will be nourished by the immortal spirit of the Italian people,…”

To display their solidarity for workers, Rossoni and Roberto Farinacci initially supported the metallurgical workers' strikes in Brescia in March 1925 in an attempt to get higher wages and union recognition. The Fascist syndicalists determined that they had to become more militant to gain more working-class support since workers still had the right to select union representation. But such tactics often failed, forcing the Fascist syndicalists to depend more and more on state authority to advance a monopoly of labor representation. Such a monopoly was finally institutionalized under Alfredo Rocco's syndical law of April 3, 1926 that "legally authorized the fascist syndicates' monopoly over worker representation." The Fascist syndicates became the sole representatives of labor.

Despite conflicts with other Fascist leaders, Rossoni admonished that “without the action of Fascism, which has broken the hegemony of the reds and whites, our union movement would not exist.”

Resenting Rossoni’s autonomous role in controlling the Fascist syndicates, the General Confederation of Industry decided to dismantle the National Confederation of Fascist Syndicates in November 1928, claiming that his syndicates had failed to “educate the masses.” His confederation was broken up and reorganized into six smaller syndicates that were arranged by economic sectors. Other historians have suggested that Fascist party leaders were attempting to clip Rossoni’s power base since his fascist syndicate sought “concrete provisions on labor contracts, minimum salaries, working hours and terms for employment,” positions that employers were usually unwilling to accept.

== Later years ==
Despite being forced to resign from the leadership of the General Confederation of Fascist Syndical Corporations, Rossoni continued to serve in Mussolini’s administration in a number of capacities; a member of the Fascist Grand Council, 1930–43, undersecretary of state, 1932–35, and minister of agriculture and forestry 1935–39. In his capacity as minister of agriculture and forestry, Rossoni ordered the replanning and reconstruction of his native town of Tresigallo along rationalist lines, intending to transform it into a "new town" of Italy.

Rossoni made himself famous on July 25, 1943, by voting against Mussolini's leadership inside the Grand Council (thus siding with the coup d'état initiated by Dino Grandi). When Mussolini regained power in northern Italy, creating the Italian Social Republic, Rossoni was sentenced to death in absentia. After escaping to Canada, he returned to Italy in 1947 when his sentence had been commuted to life imprisonment. For years, he lived in the resort town of Viareggio.
