= Red Guards (Italy) =

Italian paramilitary organization

Red Guards Guardie Rosse
- Founded: 1919
- Dissolved: 1922 (de facto)
- Parent party: Italian Socialist Party; Communist Party of Italy
- Membership: 100,000
- Ideology: Socialism; Communism; Anarchism; Syndicalism; Anti-fascism; Anti-capitalism
- Political position: Far-left
- Colors: Red
- Anthem: Bandiera Rossa

The Red Guards (Italian: Guardie Rosse), also known as Proletarian Defense Formations (Italian: Formazioni di Difesa Proletaria), were a paramilitary organization affiliated with the Italian Socialist Party (PSI) and later the Communist Party of Italy (PCdI) during the Red Biennium of the Kingdom of Italy.

== History ==
After the end of the First World War, the Italian Socialist Party (PSI) strongly increased its membership. Italy suffered a severe economic crisis at the end of the war, with high unemployment and political instability. This period was known as Red Biennium, and was characterized by mass strikes, worker manifestations as well as self-management experiments through land and factories occupations. Italy was considered to be on the brink of a revolution by the end of 1918. In 1919, the PSI de facto organized a paramilitary wing, which became known as Red Guards.

=== Revolutionary years ===
In Turin and Milan, factory councils, which the leading Italian Marxist theoretician Antonio Gramsci considered to be the Italian equivalent of Russia’s soviets, were formed and many factory occupations took place under the leadership of revolutionary socialists and anarcho-syndicalists. The agitations also extended to the agricultural areas of the Padan plain and were accompanied by peasant strikes, rural unrests and armed conflicts between left-wing and right-wing militias.

Industrial action and rural unrest increased significantly: there were 1,663 industrial strikes in 1919, compared to 810 in 1913. More than one million industrial workers were involved in 1919, three times the 1913 figure. The trend continued in 1920, which saw 1,881 industrial strikes. Rural strikes also increased substantially, from 97 in 1913 to 189 by 1920, with over a million peasants taking action. On July 20-21, 1919, a general strike was called in solidarity with the Russian Revolution.

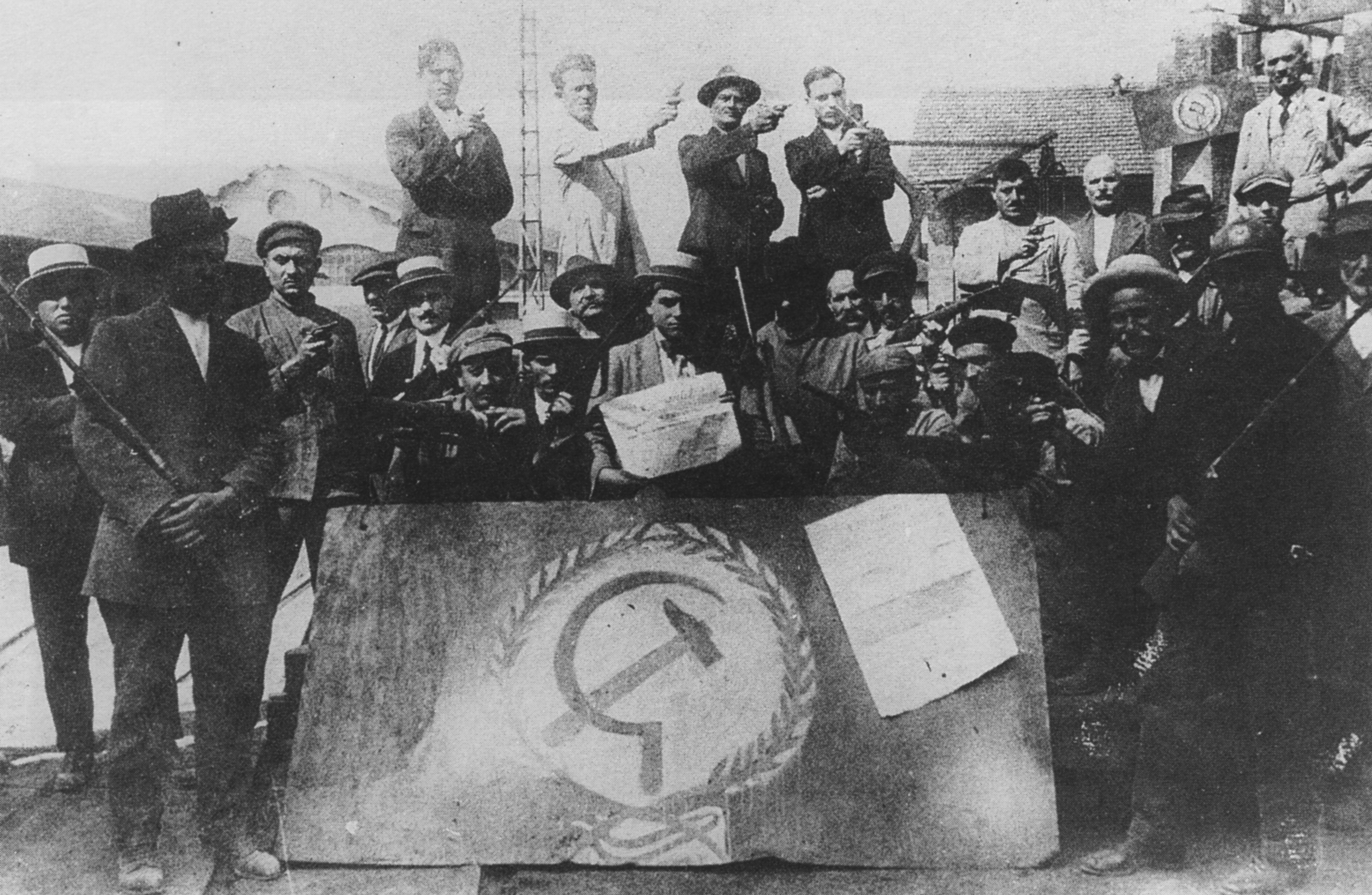
Red Guards in a factory during the Red Biennium

In April 1920, Turin metal-workers, in particular at the Fiat plants, went on strike demanding recognition for their 'factory councils', a demand the PSI and CGL did not support. The 'factory councils' more and more saw themselves as the models for a new democratically controlled economy running industrial plants, instead of as a bargaining tool with employers. The movement peaked in August and September 1920. Armed metal workers in Milan and Turin occupied their factories in response to a lockout by the employers. Factory occupations swept the "industrial triangle" of north-western Italy. Some 400,000 metal-workers and 100,000 others took part. On September 3, 185 metal-working factories in Turin had been occupied. After the founding of the Communist Party of Italy, the Red Guards became closer to it and were considered to be the military wing of the PCdI.

=== Decline and rise of Fascism ===
The Socialist Party and General Confederation of Labour (CGL) failed to see the revolutionary potential of the movement; had it been maximized and expanded to the rest of Italy, a revolutionary transformation might have been possible. Most Socialist leaders were pleased with the struggles in the North, but did little to capitalize on the impact of the occupations and uprisings. Without the support and quarantined, the movement for social change gradually waned.

By 1921, the movement was declining due to an industrial crisis that resulted in massive layoffs and wage cuts. In contrast to passive demeanor the PSI and CGL, employers and the upcoming fascist did react. The revolutionary period was followed by the violent reaction of the Fascist blackshirts militia, organized within the Italian Fasces of Combat, and eventually by the March on Rome in October 1922, which brought Benito Mussolini to power.
