= Attilio Deffenu =

Italian journalist (1890–1918)

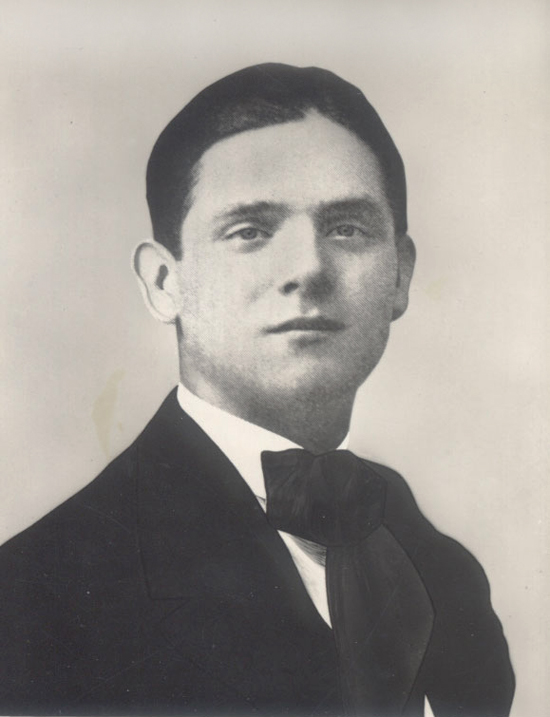
Attilio Deffenu

Attilio Deffenu (28 December 1890 – 16 June 1918) was an Italian journalist, soldier, exponent of Sardinian autonomism and a syndicalist.

He was born in 1890 in Nuoro, Sardinia, to parents Giuseppe, a merchant and president of the Società Operaia di Nuoro and Giovanna Sechi, a socialist sympathizer. In 1908, he enrolled in law at the University of Pisa, where he supported anarchist ideologies and sided against the Italian occupation of Libya.

He became correspondent for the Giornale d'Italia, engaging actively in political life: joining the revolutionary unionism and, in 1913, fighting against the protectionism customs which favoured factories in Northern Italy and penalized the economy of Southern Italy and the islands.

He died on 16 June 1918 in the Battle of the Piave River, under the command of his platoon of the infantry Sassari Mechanized Brigade, and was decorated with a Gold Medal of Military Valour.

An armed merchantman of Regia Marina launched in 1929 was named Attilio Deffenu.

== Bibliography ==
- Camillo Bellieni, Attilio Deffenu e il socialismo in Sardegna, Edizioni della Fondazione Il Nuraghe, Cagliari, 1925.
- Lorenzo Del Piano, Attilio Deffenu e la rivista Sardegna, Gallizzi, Sassari, 1963.
- Attilio Deffenu, Epistolario (1907-1918), a cura di Mario Ciusa Romagna, Fossataro, Cagliari, 1972.
- Sardegna. La rivista di Attilio Deffenu, a cura di Manlio Brigaglia, saggio introduttivo di Giovanni Maria Cherchi, Gallizzi, Sassari, 1976.
- Francesco Cucca, Lettere ad Attilio Deffenu (1907-1917), a cura di Simona Pilia, saggio introduttivo di Giuseppe Marci, CUEC, Cagliari, 2005.
- Attilio Deffenu, Scritti giornalistici (1907-1916), a cura di Giancarlo Porcu, saggio introduttivo di Gian Giacomo Ortu, Il Maestrale, Nuoro, 2008.

== See also ==
- Italian Front (World War I)
