= Rodolfo Mondolfo =

Italian philosopher (1877–1976)

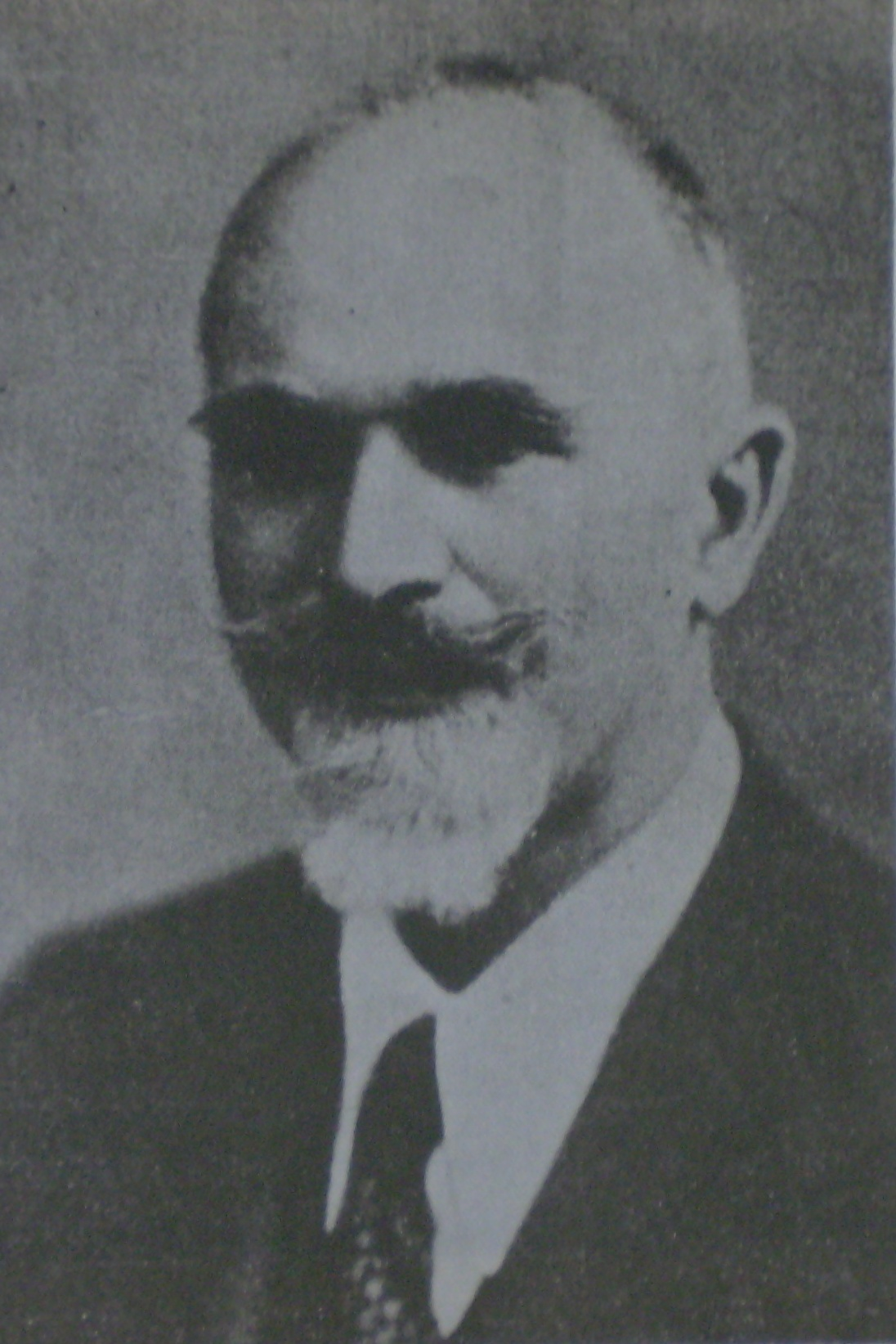
- Born: August 20, 1877; Senigallia, Italy
- Died: July 15, 1976 (aged 98); Buenos Aires, Argentina

Education
- Education: University of Florence; University of Siena

Philosophical work
- Era: 20th-century philosophy

Rodolfo Mondolfo (August 20, 1877 – July 15, 1976) was an Italian philosopher who lived in Italy and Argentina.

Born in Senigallia into a prominent family of Jewish origin, he studied at University of Florence and the University of Siena. In 1910 he started teaching at University of Turin where he worked until 1914, when he left for University of Bologna and later at the University of Padova.

Due to the enactment of racial laws he left Italy in 1938 and was exiled in Argentina. There he worked as a professor at National University of Córdoba and National University of Tucumán. At the end of World War II he could have returned to Italy, but he preferred to stay in Argentina.

He died in Buenos Aires.
