= Italian Syndicalist Union =

Italian trade union

USI
- Italian Syndicalist Union
- Unione Sindacale Italiana
- Sabo-tabby, the logo of the USI-CIT
- Established: 23 November 1912; 113 years ago; 8 December 1983; 42 years ago (refoundation)
- Dissolved: 7 January 1925; 101 years ago (banned); 9 June 1944; 82 years ago (merged into CGIL)
- Type: Trade union
- Headquarters: Via Testi 2, Parma, Italy
- Members: 1,000 (2016)
- Publication: Guerra di Classe
- Affiliations: International Workers' Association (1922–2016); International Confederation of Labour (2018–present)
- Website: usi-cit.org

The Italian Syndicalist Union (Italian: Unione Sindacale Italiana; USI) is an Italian anarcho-syndicalist trade union. Established in 1912 by a confederation of "houses of labour", the USI led a series of general strikes throughout its early years, culminating with the Red Week insurrection against the Italian entry into World War I. During the Biennio Rosso, the USI was at the forefront of the occupation of factories, which saw hundreds of workplaces throughout the country brought under the control of workers' councils. The USI also led the establishment of the International Workers' Association (IWA), which became the main international organisation of anarcho-syndicalist trade unions.

After the rise of Italian fascism, the USI was banned and its members were either arrested, driven underground or forced into exile. By the late-20th century, the USI was eventually reconstituted and once again involved itself in radical strike actions. Expelled from the IWA in 2016, together with the Spanish CNT and German FAU, it established the International Confederation of Labour (ICL), a new international of anarcho-syndicalist trade unions.

== History ==
=== Background ===
Syndicalism first arose in Italy at the turn of the 20th century, after the houses of labour (Italian: Camere del Lavoro) were established throughout the country. A series of general strikes from 1904 to 1906 brought Italian workers together into the first trade union confederations, including the General Confederation of Labour (CGL), although this was soon taken over by a reformist leadership affiliated with the Italian Socialist Party (PSI). Disillusioned with the reformist leadership, by 1907, a syndicalist faction had emerged within the CGL, establishing the National Resistance Committee. In 1908, the syndicalist rank-and-file broke away from CGL, after its leadership refused to support a number of strikes. Syndicalists subsequently led their own strikes in a variety of sectors throughout the country, culminating in a mass strike against the Italian invasion of Libya in 1911.

=== Establishment ===
In 1912, syndicalist organisations united into the Italian Syndicalist Union (Italian: Unione Sindicale Italiana; USI), which was formed as a federation of self-managing unions. As workers defected from the CGL to the USI en masse, it counted 80,000 members at the time of its constitution. In its first year of existence, the USI organised numerous general strikes, including by workers employed in marble production, metalworking, construction, agriculture, rail transport and sailing. By the outbreak of World War I in mid-1914, the USI counted 124,000 members, who led the anti-militarist mobilisation that became the Red Week insurrection.

=== War ===
Following the Italian entry into World War I, the USI split into internationalist and interventionist factions. The revolutionary interventionists, led by USI general secretary Alceste De Ambris, favoured participation in the war as a means to prepare the country for a social revolution. But they were opposed by the majority of the USI's membership, which deposed De Ambris, expelled the interventionists and elected Armando Borghi as the new general secretary. The USI subsequently called for an anti-militarist general strike, although they were ultimately incapable of putting it into practice. Meanwhile, the expelled interventionist faction established the Italian Labour Union (UIL), which moved towards national syndicalism.

=== Revolution and Reaction ===
After the war ended, the USI launched a general strike movement that involved the mass occupation of factories by workers. At the USI's Third Congress, which took place in Parma in December 1919, the union proposed the creation of a system of workers' councils that could establish workers' control over the Italian economy and manage the transition to a stateless society. In February 1920, syndicalist metalworkers brought the factories of Sestri Ponente under workers' self-management; in March, syndicalist workers were rising up in Turin; in April, the workers' uprising had swept Piedmont and Napoli, while workers took over the city of Piombino; by July 1920, metalworkers of the USI were taking over factories throughout the country. In August and September 1920, workers throughout the country took up arms and formed detachments of Red Guards, which took over 300 workplaces in Milan alone. By this time, although the USI counted over 500,000 members, it was still much smaller and less powerful than the CGL. Reformists ultimately halted the factory occupation movement, in an effort to stem social revolution. In October 1920, the government of Giovanni Giolitti arrested the USI's entire leadership.

The USI was briefly able to continue its activities, organising a general strike in Milan in March 1921, but before long it came under attack by the rising fascist movement, which broke up its trade unions and harassed its members. The USI resolved to take direct action against the fascists; it formed armed anti-fascist detachments known as the Arditi del Popolo and reinforced its labour centres. By July 1922, the anarcho-syndicalists of the USI had formed a Labour Alliance with other anti-fascist trade unions and parties. In an attempt to stop the March on Rome, the alliance called an anti-fascist general strike, but this was ultimately halted by the reformist factions. The new Fascist regime immediately carried out political repression against the left-wing, including the USI.

During this period, the USI also led the founding of the International Workers' Association (IWA), an international of trade unions established as an alternative to the Bolshevik-controlled Red International of Labour Unions (RILU).

=== Repression ===
The rise of Benito Mussolini's National Fascist Party to power brought a wave of political repression against the USI. By April 1924, the union's legal activity was paralysed; it consequently reorganised itself into an underground organisation and led a number of wildcat strikes by miners and marble producers in Tuscany. The USI was finally eliminated by 1927, as its members were arrested en masse or forced into exile.

=== Refoundation ===
In the wake of World War II, the anarcho-syndicalist movement went into a period of sustained decline, which reached its lowest point during the 1960s. But following the Protests of 1968 and the subsequent Spanish transition to democracy, renewed interest in anarcho-syndicalism led to the reconstitution of the USI in 1978. The reconstituted USI has since led a series of general strikes.

Following an internal crisis in the international anarcho-syndicalist movement, in 2016, the USI, along with the Spanish National Confederation of Labour (CNT) and German Free Workers' Union (FAU), was expelled from the IWA. Together, in 2018, they established the new International Confederation of Labour (ICL).

== See also ==
- Autonomism
- Biennio rosso
- Anarchism in Italy

== Bibliography ==
- Correa, Felipe (2023). "The Global Revival of Anarchism and Syndicalism". In van der Linden, Marcel (ed.). The Cambridge History of Socialism. Vol. 1. Cambridge University Press. pp. 621–647. doi:10.1017/9781108611022.027. ISBN 978-1-108-48134-2.
- Damier, Vadim (2009) [2000]. Anarcho-syndicalism in the 20th Century. Translated by Archibald, Malcolm. Edmonton: Black Cat Press. ISBN 978-0-9737827-6-9.
- Levy, Carl (2023). "Anarchism and Syndicalism in Italy". In van der Linden, Marcel (ed.). The Cambridge History of Socialism. Vol. 1. Cambridge University Press. pp. 411–443. doi:10.1017/9781108611022.018. ISBN 978-1-108-48134-2.
- van der Walt, Lucien; Schmidt, Michael (2009). Black Flame: The Revolutionary Class Politics of Anarchism and Syndicalism. Edinburgh: AK Press. ISBN 978-1-904859-16-1. LCCN 2006933558. OCLC 1100238201.
