= 1904 Italian general strike =

- Date: 16 September 1904
- Location: Italy
- Caused by: Killing of several striking Italian workers
- Methods: General strike

Parties
Italian workers	Government of Italy

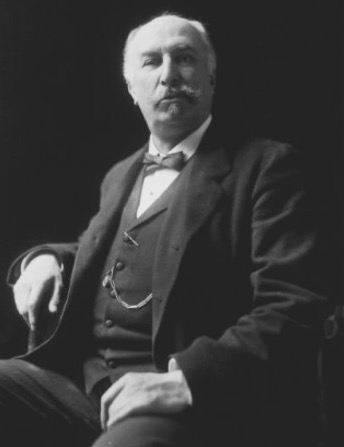
Prime Minister Giolitti, 1905

The 1904 Italian general strike began on 16 September 1904, making it the first general strike in Italian history. Workers from around the country struck in protest of the killing of several strikers. The strike shook confidence in the Italian government and would be followed by more general strikes in the years that followed.

== Background ==
The 1904 general strike was preceded by 1898 bread riots, which was a major civil conflict prompted by bread shortages in Italy. Rioters completely occupied the city of Milan for several days, leading to the Italian government dispatching half an army corps to clear the occupation. Workers from around the country traveled to Milan to participate, joined by workers and peasants from France and Switzerland. Unions from around the country called strikes in support of the bread riots. Among the casualties were hundreds of women who actively participated in the riots.

In the weeks leading up to the strike, the government of Italy began to suspect that Italian socialists were planning a "general uprising", intending to order strikes in every city in the country. One Italian-American importer in New York told the New York Times that they had received a letter and cable dispatch from a government representative in Rome warning of an immanent conflict in Naples. Italian newspaper editors reported receiving the same dispatch and decided to publish it without commentary, as had been done during the earlier bread riots, for fear of encouraging more protests internationally.

== Strike ==
Beginning at noon on 16 September 1904, The strike was called by the Chambers of Labor in several cities in response to several killings of striking workers, culminating in the shooting of a miner in Buggerru, Sardinia. Participation in the strike was strongest in the north and the Po Valley.

The government headed by Prime Minister Giovanni Giolitti ordered local authorities to intervene as little as possible, predicting that the strike would die down on its own. During the strike, all telegrams referencing it were blocked. Strikers fought with gendarmes resulting in two gendarmes being killed.

== Outcome ==
While the general strike waned on its own, it shook public confidence in the strength of the state and the middle class's support for Giolitti. The country would experience many general strikes in the years following 1904, with additional general strikes in 1905, 1906, 1909, 1911, and 1914.
