= Biennio Rosso =

Social conflict in Italy (1919–1920)

- Part of the Revolutions of 1917–1923
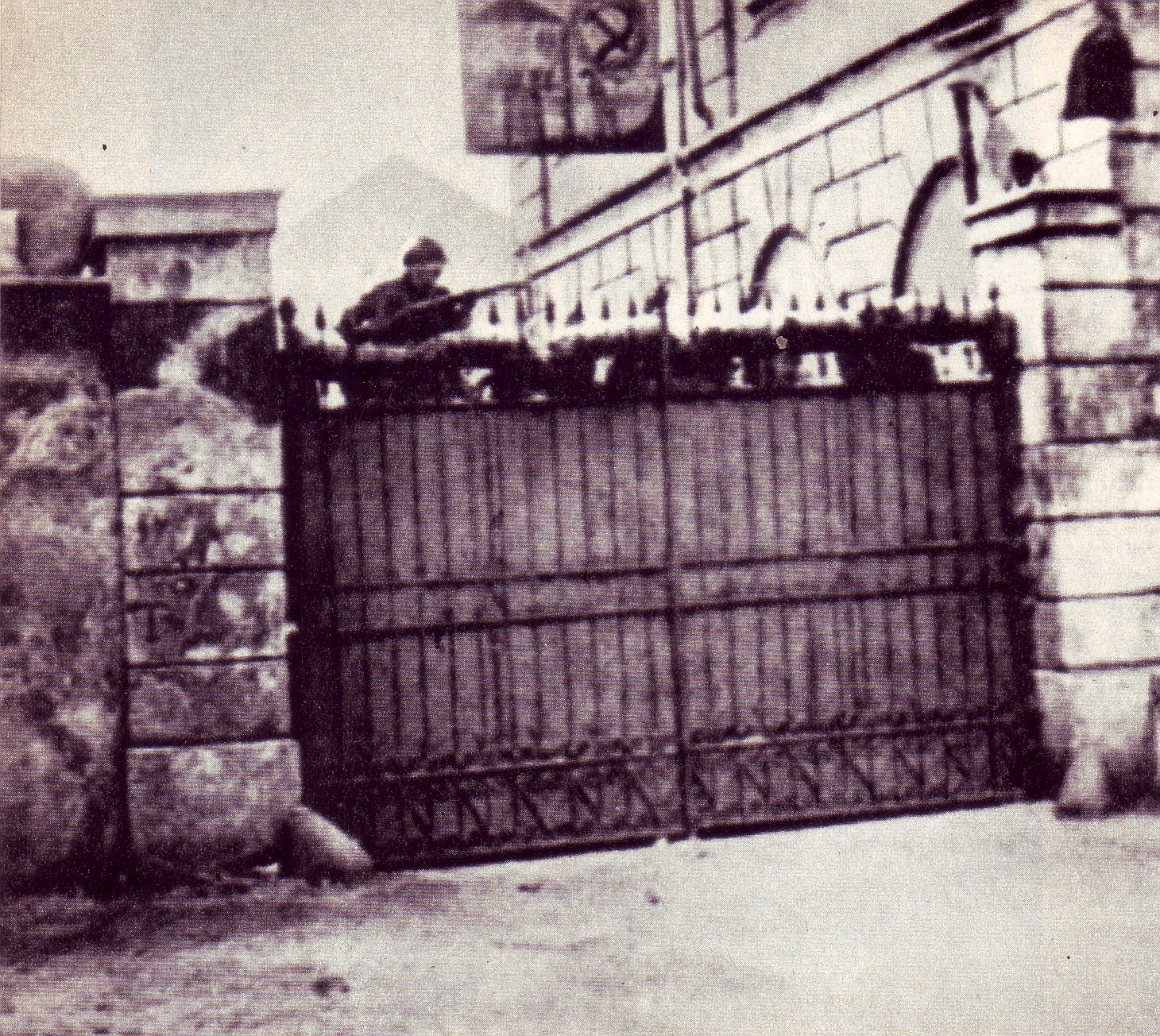
- Armed workers occupying factories in Milan, September 1920
- Date: 1919–1920
- Location: Italy
- Caused by: The economic crisis in the aftermath of World War I, with high unemployment and political instability
- Methods: Mass strikes, worker manifestations as well as self-management experiments through land and factory occupations
- Result: The revolutionary period was followed by the violent reaction of the fascist blackshirts militia and eventually by the March on Rome of Benito Mussolini in 1922.

Parties
Italian Revolutionaries: Workers' councils; Red Guards	Italy: Blackshirts

The Biennio Rosso (English: "Red Biennium" or "Two Red Years") was a two-year period, between 1919 and 1920, of intense social conflict in Italy, following the First World War. The revolutionary period was followed by the violent reaction of the fascist blackshirts militia and eventually by the March on Rome of Benito Mussolini in 1922.

== Background ==
The Biennio Rosso took place in a context of economic crisis at the end of the war, with high unemployment and political instability. It was characterized by strikes and mass worker demonstrations, as well as self-management experiments through land and factory occupations. Tension had been rising since the final years of the war, and some contemporary observers considered Italy to be on the brink of a revolution by the end of 1918.

The population was confronted with rising inflation and a significant increase in the price of basic goods, in a period when extensive unemployment was aggravated by mass demobilization of the Royal Italian Army at the end of the war. Association to the trade unions, the Italian Socialist Party (Partito Socialista Italiano, PSI), and the anarchist movement increased substantially. The PSI increased its membership to 250,000, the major socialist trade union, the General Confederation of Labour (Confederazione Generale del Lavoro, CGL), reached two million members, while the anarchist Italian Syndicalist Union (Unione Sindacale Italiana, USI) reached between 300,000 and 500,000 affiliates. The anarchist movement was boosted by the return from exile of its prominent propagandist Errico Malatesta in December 1919.

== Events ==
In Turin and Milan, factory councils – which the leading Italian Marxist theoretician Antonio Gramsci considered to be the Italian equivalent of Russia's soviets – were formed and many factory occupations took place under the leadership of revolutionary socialists and anarcho-syndicalists. The agitations also extended to the agricultural areas of the Padan Plain and were accompanied by peasant strikes, rural unrests, and armed conflicts between left-wing and right-wing militias.

Industrial action and rural unrest increased significantly: there were 1,663 industrial strikes in 1919, compared to 810 in 1913. More than one million industrial workers were involved in 1919, three times the 1913 figure. The trend continued in 1920, which saw 1,881 industrial strikes. Rural strikes also increased substantially, from 97 in 1913 to 189 by 1920, with over a million peasants taking action. On July 20–21, 1919, a general strike was called in solidarity with the Russian Revolution. Rural militants also seized land that had gone uncultivated from landlords, taking 27,000 hectares of such land in 1919 alone.

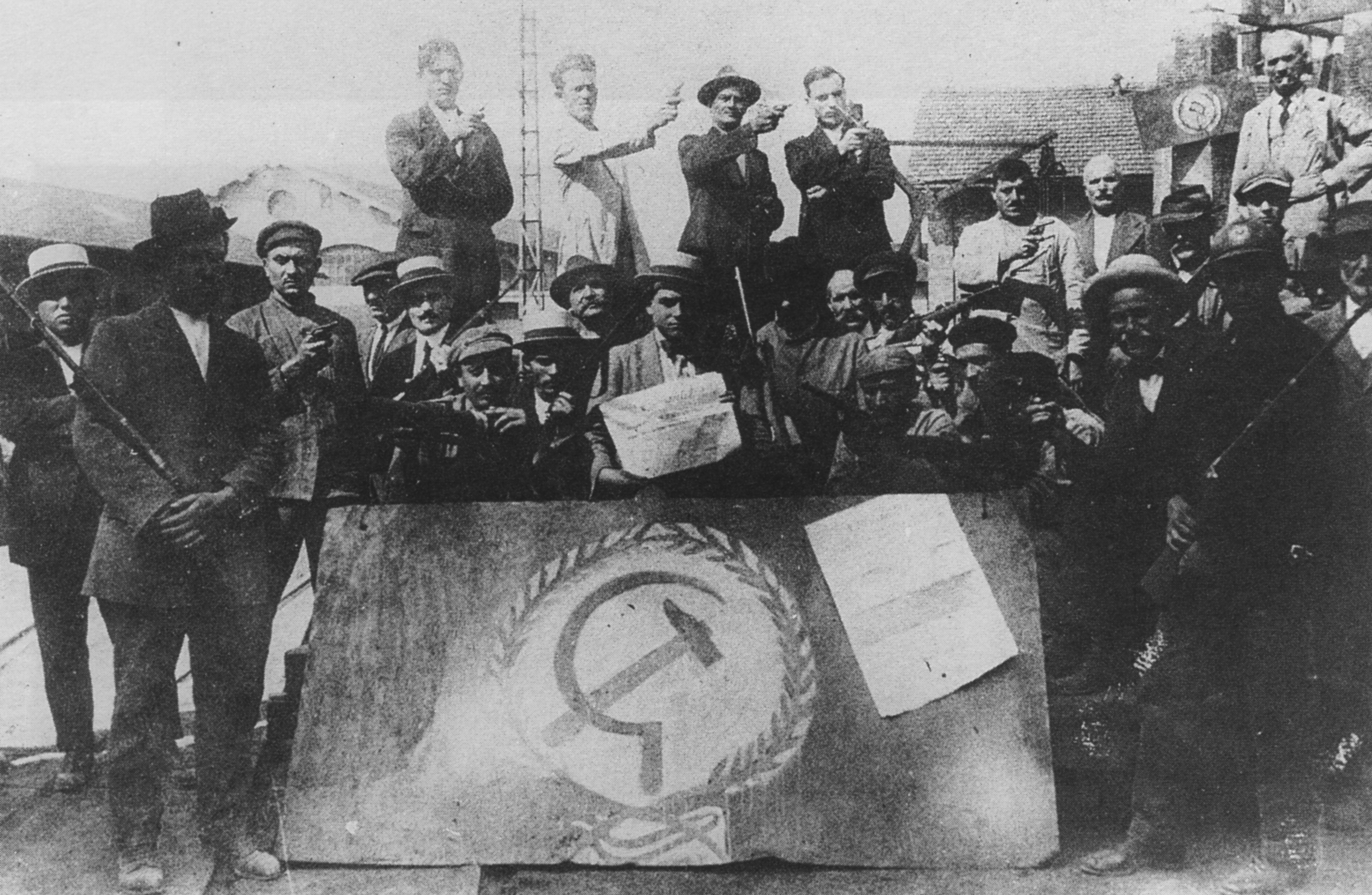
Factories manned by the Red Guards in 1920

In April 1920, Turin metalworkers, in particular at the Fiat plants, went on strike demanding recognition for their "factory councils", a demand the PSI and CGL did not support. The factory councils more and more saw themselves as the models for a new democratically controlled economy running industrial plants, instead of purely as a bargaining tool with employers. The movement peaked in August and September 1920. Armed metal workers in Milan and Turin occupied their factories in response to a lockout by the employers. Factory occupations swept the "industrial triangle" of north-western Italy. Some 400,000 metal-workers and 100,000 others took part. On September 3, 185 metal-working factories in Turin had been occupied.

According to William A. Pelz, the PSI and CGL failed to see the revolutionary potential of the movement; had it been maximized and expanded to the rest of Italy, a revolutionary transformation might have been possible. Most Socialist leaders were pleased with the struggles in the North, but did little to capitalize on the impact of the occupations and uprisings. Without the support and quarantined, the movement for social change gradually waned.

== Aftermath ==
By 1921, the movement was declining due to an industrial crisis that resulted in massive layoffs and wage cuts. In contrast to the passive demeanor of the PSI and CGL, employers and the fascists did react. The revolutionary period was followed by the violent reaction of the Fascist blackshirts militia (the Fasci Italiani di Combattimento) with the support of Italian industrialists and landowners. And eventually by the March on Rome of Benito Mussolini in October 1922.

Fascist austerity imposed from 1922 to 1928 resulted in workers' gross wage share tumbling back to 1913 levels by 1929, reversing the gains made during 1919–1920, when, according to political economist Clara Mattei, "average Italian nominal daily industrial wages quintupled (around a 400 percent increase) compared to their prewar levels" by 1921. A 1924 article published in The Times lauded the imposition of austerity: "the development of the last two years have seen the absorption of a greater proportion of profits by capital, and this, by stimulating business enterprise, has most certainly been advantageous to the country as a whole."

A quantitative sociological study of the period by analyzing newspaper news in the period clearly demonstrates the evolution of violence acts between the social groups involved.

== See also ==
- Revolutions of 1917–1923
- Aftermath of World War I
- March on Rome
- Benito Mussolini
- Fascist and anti-Fascist violence in Italy (1919–1926)
- Labin Republic
