= Red Week (Italy) =

- Map showing regions affected by the Red Week: Emilia-Romagna, and Marche
- Date: 7–14 June 1914
- Location: Romagna and the Marche
- Caused by: Liberal reforms, killing of anti-militarist protestors
- Goals: Revolution
- Methods: Strike actions, rioting
- Result: Suppressed

Parties
Italian left wing: Republican Party; Socialist Party; Syndicalist Union	Kingdom of Italy: Liberal Union; Carabinieri; Royal Italian Army

Lead figures
Oddo Marinelli; Errico Malatesta; Pietro Nenni; Benito Mussolini	Antonio Salandra

Number
60,000 demonstrators	100,000 soldiers

Red Week was the name given to a week of unrest which occurred from 7 to 14 June 1914. Over these seven days, Italy saw widespread rioting and large-scale strikes throughout the Italian provinces of Romagna and the Marche.

== Origins ==
The rioters were protesting in response to a series of reforms introduced in 1914 initiated by the previous Prime Minister Giovanni Giolitti (Salandra was PM by June 1914) which aimed to 'consume' the working class into Italy's liberal system. The final spark that caused the outbreak of the mass strikes was the death of three anti-militarist men in June. Despite a widening of suffrage and a change in the government's policies concerning industrial disputes (in favour of workers), a general strike was called in support of large demonstrations in many major industrialised towns, which in turn had been caused by the shooting of three socialist protesters. However, due to the nature of the Italian Socialist Party (PSI), the strike was uncoordinated and rioters were headed off by government troops.

The situation was regarded so grave that the government deployed “100,000 soldiers,” including many reservists, resulting in the death of 17 rioters and a thousand injured. The widespread riots paralyzed almost every major city for two days. The would-be revolutionaries briefly seized control of “entire towns in central Italy; railways were cut, bridges destroyed,” while the insurgents displayed red flags on public buildings.

== Effects ==
The riots during Red Week frightened the lower middle classes, and proved that Italy's problems of unification were more than just the growing pains of a young nation. Italy's Wars of Unification (Risorgimento) and following trade measures had failed to iron out inequalities between its industrialised North and agricultural South - the needs of both could not simultaneously be satisfied by Giolitti's liberal politics.

Benito Mussolini was the only prominent Marxist to defend the popular street uprising that was referred to in Italy as Settimana Rossa (Red Week). Mussolini considered Red Week as his “greatest achievement and disappointment” during his leadership of the Italian Socialist Party, regarding the strike as the pinnacle of radical class struggle but also as an abysmal failure. Although Mussolini hailed Red Week as the beginning of the end of capitalism in Italy, it became evident to many within the labor and socialist movement that rebellion, general strikes and revolutionary “myths” did not constitute revolution. The strikes resulted in making reactionary elements of the nation stronger as the middle class and conservatives rallied behind their government to put down the rebellion, while the socialists were left with disappointment and recrimination for engaging in an unsuccessful uprising. The failure of Red Week provided evidence of the severe limitations of current class socialism. Mussolini argued that Italy’s industrial sector was not mature enough and had neither a fully developed modern bourgeoisie nor a modern proletarian movement.

Following the events of June 1914, editorials in Benito Mussolini's political journal Avanti! urged that more drastic measures be taken against the Italian government, and Italy's joining of the First World War subsequent to the Red Week gave huge credence to Mussolini's rhetoric against the sycophantic government, which had presented itself as an easy target for its entry into the Great War. After Mussolini’s Fascist regime was overthrown in 1943-45 it was not difficult for a certain number of “ex-Blackshirts to swing to left-wing political extremism”, sometimes joining anti-fascist organizations. Sharing a common hostility toward democratic parliamentary government, adherents of fascism and communism often found themselves appealing to the “same kinds of alienated people.”
