= 1922 Italian general strike =

General strike against Benito Mussolini

The Italian general strike of summer 1922 was a general strike against Benito Mussolini's power-grab with the March on Rome. It was led by socialists and ended in defeat for the workers. Mussolini famously referred to this as the "Caporetto of Italian Socialism".

Rudolph Rocker, an active Anarcho-Syndicalist of this period, claimed the event in his book: "When in 1922 the general strike against Fascism broke out, the democratic government armed the Fascist hordes and throttled this last attempt at the defence of freedom and right. But Italian democracy had dug its own grave. It thought it could use Mussolini as a tool against the workers, but thus it became its own grave-digger."
