= Paolo Orano =

Italian psychologist and politician

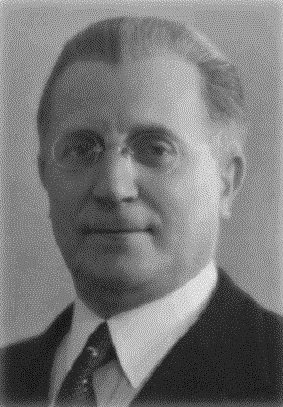
- Paolo Orano in the 1920s
- Born: June 15, 1875; Rome, Kingdom of Italy
- Died: April 7, 1945 (aged 69); Padula, Kingdom of Italy
- Education: Sapienza University of Rome
- Occupations: Psychologist; Politician; University teacher; Writer; Journalist
- Employer: University of Perugia
- Political party: Italian Socialist Party (1904–1906); Sardinian Action Party (1919-1922); National Fascist Party (1924–1945)
- Spouses: Gina Fantacchiotti (m. 1900; died 1919) Camille Mallarmé (m. 1920)
- Relatives: André Mallarmé (brother-in-law)

Signature
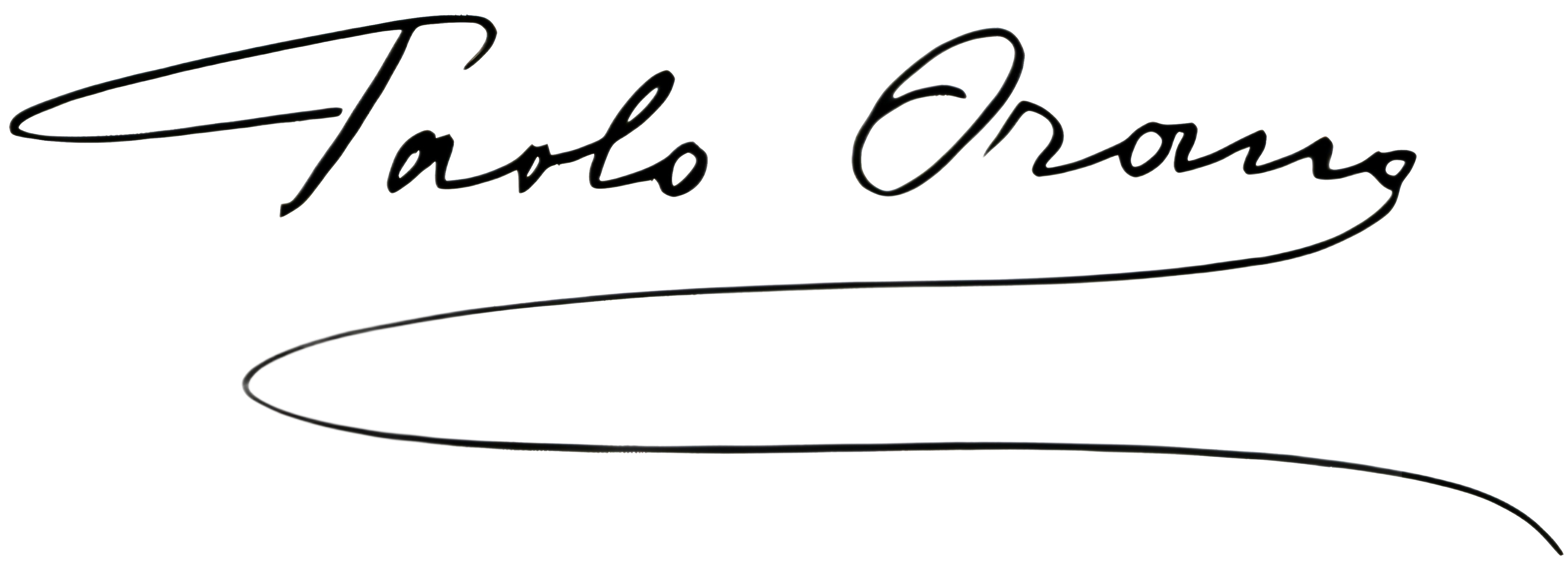

Paolo Orano (15 June 1875 – 7 April 1945) was an Italian psychologist, politician and writer. Orano began his political career as a syndicalist in the Italian Socialist Party. After 1910 he became influenced by the ideas of Georges Sorel and left the Socialist Party. During the First World War he adopted a nationalist position and supported the Italian war effort. After the war, he joined the Fascist movement. He later became a leading figure within the National Fascist Party, in part through his legitimization of antisemitism in the 1930s.

== Early life ==
Orano was born in 1875 in Rome to a local father and a Sardinian mother. He studied literature and philosophy at the University of Rome and graduated in 1898. The next year he began teaching philosophy in high school, and was employed in several places including Siena, Senigallia and Tivoli. He also worked with various publishers.

== Syndicalism ==
Orano began his political career as one of a number of leading syndicalist thinkers associated with the Italian Socialist Party at the turn of the century. His estrangement from the Socialists began in 1905 when he resigned his position at the newspaper Avanti! following the dismissal of syndicalist Enrico Leone.

Along with fellow syndicalists Arturo Labriola and Robert Michels, as well as nationalist Enrico Corradini, Orano became part of a group of intellectuals who followed the ideals of Georges Sorel. To this end he founded his own weekly journal, La Lupa, in October 1910. It came to represent the first collaboration between syndicalists like Orano and nationalists like Enrico Corradini. Benito Mussolini would later claim that this paper was an influence on his political ideas. Orano became a strong critic of democracy, seeing it as the cause of Italy's ills and his rhetoric, along with that of fellow syndicalists such as Filippo Corridoni and Angelo Olivetti, was by 1914 very similar to that coming from the Italian Nationalist Association. Orano supported the First World War, ostensibly because he hoped that it would strengthen both the bourgeoisie and proletariat and thus hasten the process of class conflict and revolution. However his views caused considerable controversy within the syndicalist movement and helped to bring about its fragmentation as many of those associated with the movement, in particular Leone, were anti-war. By the end of the war his positions were largely indistinguishable from those of the nationalists.

== Fascism ==
Orano soon moved over to the Fascists and during the March on Rome he served as Mussolini's chief of staff, whilst also occupying a seat on the Grand Council of the party. He enjoyed a high-profile under the fascist government, serving in the parliament and holding the post of rector of the University of Perugia.

His most notable contribution to fascism was his antisemitism and he was the author in 1937 of the book The Jews in Italy. The book was influenced by Bernard Lazare in so much as it accepted his thesis that the activities of the Jews themselves helped to cause antisemitism, although it made no reference to Lazare's refutations of the prejudice. In the book Orano expressed affection for some individual Jews, notably Ettore Ovazza, but nonetheless the book helped to legitimise antisemitism as a part of Italian fascism and laid the groundwork for later persecutions. Despite this the non-biological nature of his antisemitism meant that he did not go far enough for Giovanni Preziosi, who attacked Orano's work in his journal La Vita Italiana.

Captured in 1944 he was held along with many fellow fascist officials at a prison camp at Padula where he died the following year following complications with a peptic ulcer haemorrhage.

== Other writing ==
As well as his political writing Orano was also noted for his psychological and philosophical work. His 1897 book Cristo e Quirino criticised Christianity from a Nietzschean perspective, suggesting that it told people to accept their lot in life and thus solidified hierarchy in society. Mussolini would later use these arguments about the parallels between the Roman Catholic Church and the Roman Empire, and thus common ground between fascism and Catholicism, during his negotiations with Pius XI, much to horror of the pontiff who considered the very notion heretical.

His 1902 book Psicologia Sociale sought to attack transpersonal psychology and instead argued in favour of materialism and inductive reasoning that took into account the works of Karl Marx and Charles Darwin.
