= Proletarian nation =

Nationalist concept

Proletarian nation was a term used by 20th-century Italian nationalist intellectuals such as Enrico Corradini to refer to Italy and other nations that they regarded as being productive, morally vigorous, and inclined to bold action, which they considered to be characteristics associated with the proletariat. Corradini admired revolutionary proletarian movements such as syndicalism for their tactics, although he opposed their goals, and he wanted to inspire a radical nationalist movement that would use similar tactics in service of different goals: a movement that would advocate imperialist war in place of class revolution, while maintaining the same methods of "maximum cohesion, concentration of forces, iron discipline and utter ruthlessness." Corradini associated the concept of proletariat with the economic function of production, arguing that all producers are in a moral sense proletarian (not only the workers, but also productive owners and entrepreneurs), and he believed that all producers should be at the forefront of a new imperialist proletarian nation.

The concept of a "proletarian nation" was later adopted by fascists after World War I, and it was used to attempt to draw the working class away from socialism and communism by arguing that the struggle between classes could be replaced by a struggle between nations, specifically between "proletarian nations" and plutocracies.

== Origins ==
Enrico Corradini coined the term "proletarian nation" in 1910, as part of an argument for a new type of radical nationalism that would take inspiration from "the fire, the nerve, the decisiveness" of the revolutionary left, but promote war instead of revolution and territorial conquest instead of overthrowing the ruling class. Corradini opposed revolutionary socialism and syndicalism in Italy for their anti-patriotism, anti-militarism, internationalism and advocacy of class conflict, but he and other nationalists admired the revolutionary and conquering spirit of these proletarian movements. At a meeting of the Italian Nationalist Association in 1910, Corradini said:

We are the proletarian people in respect to the rest of the world. Nationalism is our socialism. This established, nationalism must be founded on the truth that Italy is morally and materially a proletarian nation

— Manifesto of the Italian Nationalist Association, December 1910

The newly developed concept, proletarian nation, was advocated in a weekly magazine, La Lupa, which was founded by Paolo Orano in October 1910 and of which Corradini was among the leading contributors.

== Use of the concept ==
The concept was occasionally used by Benito Mussolini from before World War II until his death. The term indicated not only the difference between fascism and capitalism, but also between communism and fascism.

In one of his last interviews before his death in 1945, Mussolini told journalist Ivanoe Fossani that "we are proletarian nations that rise up against the plutocrats" and that "I am more convinced than ever that the world can not get out of the dilemma: either Rome or Moscow."

The term "proletarian nation" was also used in Germany in the 1920s by the Strasserite wing of the Nazi Party, who were critical of Adolf Hitler's leadership and sought to give their party a greater appeal to German workers. Gregor Strasser and his brother Otto Strasser, together with associates including Joseph Goebbels, responded to socialists with an appeal for proletarian nationalism. They argued that there should not be a "call of the proletarian class but of proletarian nations." Regarding Germany as having been humiliated, betrayed and plundered after World War I, the Strasser faction saw the "world as divided into oppressing and oppressed people" and supported the idea of an alliance between Germany and other oppressed nations, which Hitler branded "political nonsense". Much later, Nazi official and head of the German Labour Front Robert Ley described Germany as a proletarian nation in 1940.

Ikki Kita referred to Japan as "a proletariat in international terms" to describe how Japan had had a difficult time securing colonies after the Meiji Restoration since other nations such as the Britain and Russia had already established their ownership of vast territories with natural resources across the world. Since this carving up of territory had left Japan with relatively little ability to expand without provoking a war, Kita concluded that Japan had a right to wage such a war in order to re-divide the world's colonies.

== Use in Maoism ==
A similar term was also used in China and broader Marxist discourse. Theorists such as Li Dazhao, one of the founders of the Chinese Communist Party, conceptualized nations like China as a whole as a "proletarian nation" or "proletarian country" (Note: simplified Chinese: 无产阶级国家; traditional Chinese: 無產階級國家) in contrast to "plutocratic nations," viewing the white races as the world ruling class. Later Maoist movements, such as the Maoist Internationalist Movement, have also used the term to refer to oppressed nations of the Third World in contrast to bourgeois (First World) nations. In the 1970s, the Maoist Revolutionary Communist Party, USA used the term "dispersed proletarian nation of a new type" to refer exclusively to African-Americans as a nation of mostly wage laborers and industrial workers (with no significant black bourgeoisie or peasantry as in other nations), dispersed across the territory of the United States.

== See also ==
- Nationalism
- Bourgeois nation
- Ideological origins of Fascism
- Plutocracy
