= Maraviglia =

Maraviglia is an Italian surname. Notable people with the surname include:

- Giuseppe Maria Maraviglia (1617–1684), Italian Roman Catholic bishop
- Lilia Maraviglia, Bulgarian actress
- Maurizio Maraviglia (1878–1955), Italian politician and academic

== See also ==
- MSC Meraviglia, a cruise ship owned and operated by MSC Cruises
