= Roberto Forges Davanzati =

Italian politician, journalist and academic (1880–1936)

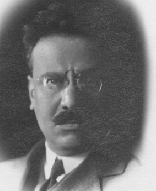
Roberto Forges Davanzati

Roberto Forges Davanzati (23 February 1880, Naples – 1 June 1936, Rome) was an Italian journalist, academic and politician. Initially a syndicalist, he later became a nationalist and fascist.

== Life and career ==
After obtaining a degree in law Forges Davanzati, a member of the Italian Socialist Party (PSI), became a journalist with the party papers Avanti! and Avanguardia Socialista. Associated with the syndicalist tendency of the party his interest in nationalism grew and in 1906 he left the PSI to take up a position at the paper Pagine Libre, which had been founded by Angelo Oliviero Olivetti and which soon became associated with national syndicalism.

Forges Davanzati soon converted to full nationalism and took a position with Corriere della Sera, at the time a nationalist sympathising paper He became one of the founders of the more hard-line nationalist newspaper L'Idea Nazionale in 1911. He confirmed his full conversion by joining the Italian Nationalist Association (INA) before leaving to serve in the First World War.

Associated with the pro-fascist tendency within the INA immediately after the war, he endorsed the merger of the two groups and was the secretary of the provisional directorate of the National Fascist Party immediately after the fusion of the two groups. He also served as a member of the Grand Council of Fascism and from 1925 was editor of La Tribuna-Idea Nazionale, a merger of the two groups' newspapers. He was appointed to the Italian Senate in 1934. Benefitting from his closeness to the government, Forges Davanzati also taught political science as the Sapienza University of Rome and broadcast a daily radio show Chronicles of the Regime.
