= Hubert Lagardelle =

French politician

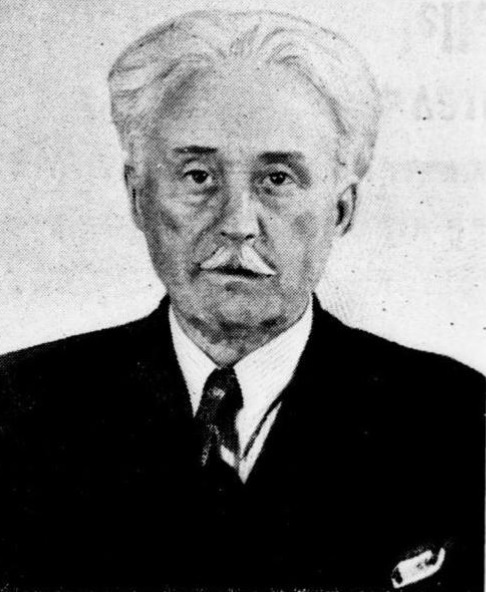
- Lagardelle in 1942

Minister of Labour
- In office 20 April 1942 – 23 November 1943
- Prime Minister: Pierre Laval
- Preceded by: René Belin
- Succeeded by: Jean Bichelonne

Personal details
- Born: 8 July 1874 Le Burgaud, Haute-Garonne
- Died: 20 September 1958 (aged 84) Paris
- Occupation: Political theorist, politician

Hubert Lagardelle (French pronunciation: [ybɛʁ laɡaʁdɛl]; 8 July 1874 – 20 September 1958) was a pioneer of French revolutionary syndicalism. He regularly authored reviews for the Plans magazine, was co-founder of the journal Prélude, and Minister of Labour in the Vichy regime.

== Revolutionary syndicalism ==
Finishing his studies in Law with a thesis on trade unions, Hubert Lagardelle began his career in journalism by founding the Toulouse Marxist journal Socialist Youth (1895). In 1896, he became a member of the French Workers' Party (Marxist) of Jules Guesde. In 1899, he founded the Le Mouvement socialiste, a theoretical journal of socialism and syndicalism which remains a benchmark in the history of French socialism. Lagardelle took influence from the theories of Proudhon, Marx and Georges Sorel. As a socialist activist, he attended meetings of the General Confederation of Labour (CGT) and was a contributor to the development of the revolutionary syndicalist movement in the years 1904–1908.

== Fascism and national syndicalism ==
In 1910, disappointed with the evolution of the CGT, Lagardelle retired to Toulouse where he became responsible for the local chamber of commerce. Like many other contemporary French revolutionary unionists, such as Gustave Hervé and Georges Valois, he left the labour movement and developed a tendency towards fascism. In 1926, he joined the Toulouse section of the Faisceau, the first French fascist party. Benito Mussolini attributed the genesis of Fascism in part to Lagardelle, writing in his "The Doctrine of Fascism" (1932): "In the great river of fascism, you will find that the veins run back to Sorel, Peguy, to the Lagardelle Socialist Movement and the Italian trade unionists, who from 1904 to 1914, carried a new note in socialist circles with Pagine libere of Olivetti, La Lupa of Orano, Il Divenire Social of E. Leone."

== Vichy government and later life ==
Fascinated by Italian fascism, Lagardelle assisted the Ambassador of France to Rome, Henry de Jouvenel, from 1932 to 1937 in an attempt to establish a Franco-Italian alliance to prevent further German expansionism.

Lagardelle became Minister of Labour for the Vichy government of Pierre Laval (April 1942 – November 1943). In 1943, he was forced to resign from the government and became editor of the Socialist France newspaper. In 1946, he was sentenced to life imprisonment for collaboration but released because of his age in 1949.

He died on 20 September 1958 and was buried at the Saint-Ouen Cemetery.

== Works ==
- Writings by Hubert Lagardelle on libcom.org
- The Agrarian Question and Socialism (1899)
- The Evolution of Labour Unions in France (1900)
- Intellectuals to Socialism (1901)
- The Confederation of Labour and Socialism (1907)
- Unionism and Socialism (1908)
- The Socialist Party and the General Confederation of Labour, Paris, River, 1908.
- Bakunin and Marx, 1909, published in the International.
- Text and Comment letters of Georges Sorel Hubert Lagardelle, 1933, Rome.
- The Italian Fascist Regime, 1935 in the French Encyclopedia.
- Twenty years of history of Italy, 1937.
- The French Socialism.
- Rome Mission Mussolini, 1955.

== Sources ==
- Christine Bouneau, Hubert Lagardelle: un bourgeois révolutionnaire et son époque, 1996
- Zeev Sternhell, La droite révolutionnaire, 1885–1914, Seuil, 1978.
- Bernard-Henri Lévy, L'Idéologie française, Grasset, 1981.
- Simon Epstein, Les Dreyfusards sous l'Occupation, éd. Albin Michel, 2001.
- Lettres d'Hubert Lagardelle à Robert Michels (1903-1936), with introduction by Willy Gianinazzi
