= Pio Viazzi =

Member of the Chamber of Deputies
- In office 1905–1913
- Constituency: Grosseto

Personal details
- Born: 16 March 1868 Gavi, Province of Alessandria, Kingdom of Italy
- Died: 22 October 1914 (aged 46)
- Party: Italian Republican Party
- Education: University of Turin
- Occupation: Jurist, philosopher

Pio Viazzi (16 March 1868 – 22 October 1914) was an Italian politician, philosopher and jurist.

== Life and career ==
Viazzi was born in Gavi, in the province of Alessandria, on 16 March 1868. He graduated in law from the University of Turin in July 1889.

A respected theorist and scholar of law, he gained recognition for his work in legal and philosophical studies, including his examination of sexual behaviour and sexual offence within the framework of criminal law.

In September 1905, he was elected to the Chamber of Deputies of the Kingdom of Italy as a member of the Republican Party, representing the constituency of Grosseto. He succeeded Ettore Socci in a by-election, defeating the Radical candidate Angelo Banti. Viazzi served in Parliament for two legislatures (22nd and 23rd). In 1913, he lost the election for the 24th legislature to the socialist Giovanni Merloni.

Viazzi died the following year, on 22 October 1914.
