= Blueshirts (Italian Nationalist Association) =

The Blueshirts (Camicie Azzurre) or Sempre Pronti was the paramilitary wing of the Italian Nationalist Association. It was dissolved in 1923 after the creation of the Voluntary Militia for National Security. The organisation was founded in 1919 by Dino Zanetti. It initially consisted of members of the Lega Latina della Gioventù. The first collision with communists happened on March 16, 1919 in Bologna.
