= Avanti! (newspaper) =

Italian newspaper

- Type: Daily newspaper
- Format: Berliner
- Owner: Società Nuova Editrice Mondoperaio s.r.l.
- Editor: Mauro Del Bue
- Founded: 25 December 1896
- Ceased publication: December 1993 (only online from 2012)
- Political alignment: 1896–1976: Socialism; 1976–present: Social democracy
- Language: Italian
- Headquarters: Rome, Italy (1896–1993)
- Website: www.avantionline.it

Avanti! (Italian: [aˈvan.ti]; lit. 'Forward!') is an Italian daily newspaper, born as the official voice of the Italian Socialist Party, published since 25 December 1896. It took its name from its German counterpart Vorwärts, the newspaper of the Social Democratic Party of Germany.

== History ==
=== Foundation ===
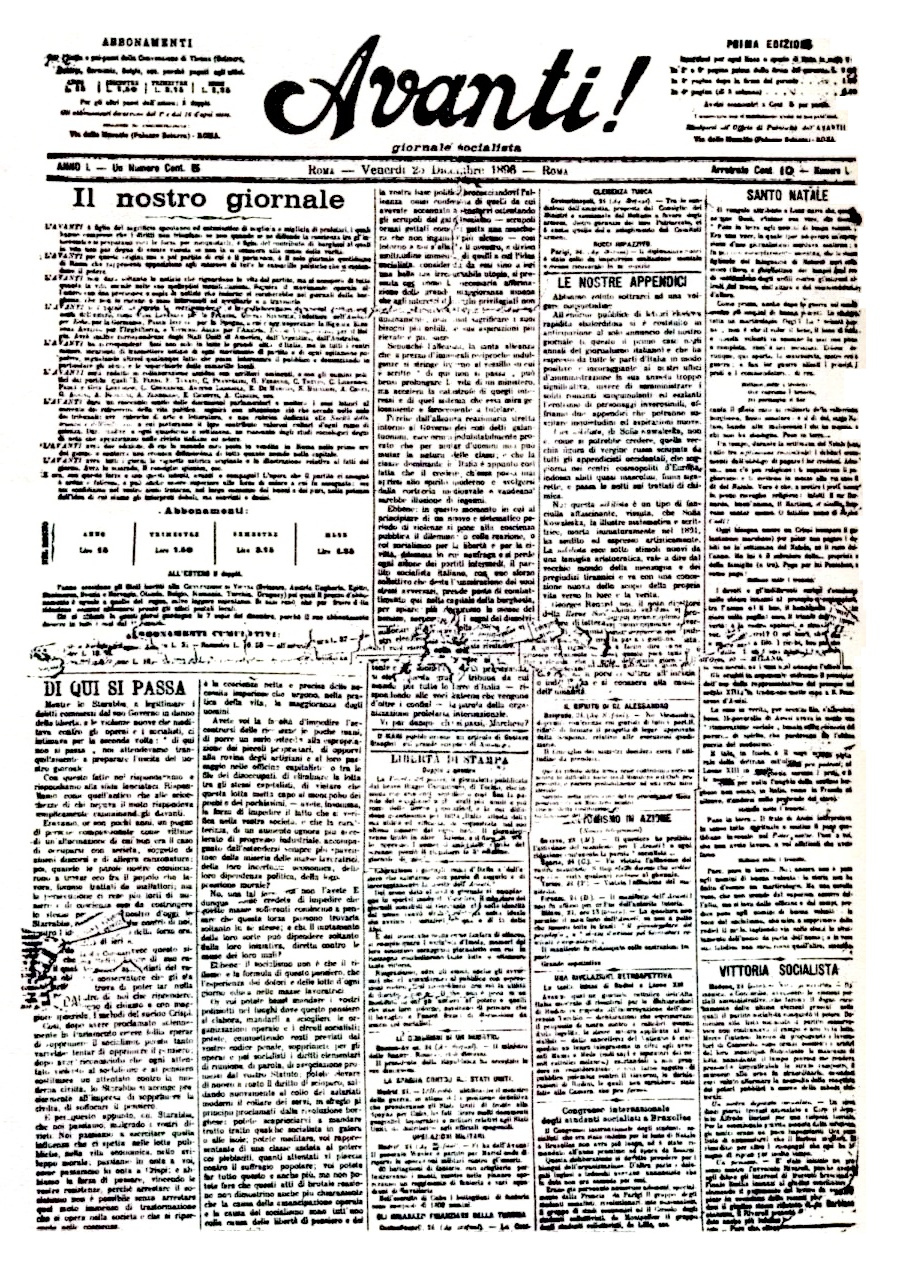
Front page of the first number of Avanti! (25 December 1896)

In the mid-1890s, the Italian Socialist Party owned numerous newspapers and periodical journals published in various parts of the Italian Kingdom, but those had limited runs, and they were funded by the same militants of the Party. However, PSI (the Italian-language abbreviation of the Italian Socialist Party) obtained an important standing in the elections of 1895, and during the IVth Socialist Congress of Florence in July 1896, programs for the editorial development were promoted along with the origination of a nationwide newspaper.

The first number of Avanti! was published on 25 December 1896, on Christmas, because the new newspaper sought to represent Italian socialism as intended as "a new voice that does not descend from the airy high sky, but it lifts up from workshops and fields and predicts the peace to men of good will" or their own rendition of what they considered a "holy birth". After all, Jesus Christ was referred to as the "first socialist in history" in the contemporary socialist iconography.

The first director was Leonida Bissolati, with Ivanoe Bonomi, Walter Mocchi, Alessandro Schiavi, Oddino Morgari and Gabriele Galantara as editors. The last one was a designer and satirical cartoonist who drew the logo for the newspapers, characterized by an italic font and the exclamation point at the end with the typical liberty style of the end of the 19th century. Along with Guido Podrecca, Galantara was also the founder in 1892 of L'Asino, an important satirical journal.

Avanti! was inspired by the newspaper of the Social Democratic Party of Germany called Vorwärts.

Previously, other newspapers had been founded with the same title: on 30 April 1881 Andrea Costa founded the Avanti! and philosopher Antonio Labriola launched Avanti (without exclamation mark) in May 1896, on which the libertarian socialist Francesco Saverio Merlino wrote.

=== Di qui si passa ===
In the editorial of published in the first number of Avanti!, director Bissolati wrote an ideal and political manifest of the identity of the new newspaper, challenging the contemporary order.

Addressing directly to the Italian Prime Minister and Minister of the Interior Antonio Starabba, Marchese di Rudinì, who had warned the PSI leaders and subscribed with the intimation "di qui non-si passa" ('Do not pass from here'), Bissolati answered "di qui si passa" ('From here we pass'), manifesting the faith and "scientific" certainty in the affirmations of socialist reasons and in the conquest of power by workers:

And now today this gentlemen instead—who does not act on his whim but obeys to instincts of the colourful conservatory party which stays behind him—does not find he can do anything better against us than retake, with less noise and more hypocrisy, the methodic of the suicide of Crispi.

So, after solemnly declaring in Parliament that hoping to suppress socialism is madness because the attempt to suppress the thought would be so much worthy; after recognizing that every violent attempt against socialism and thought is an attempt against the modern civilization, Starabba is precisely going to suppress the civilization, to choke thought. And just for this reason, Mr. Starabba, that we pass despite your prohibitions.

We pass to exercise that influence we deserve in public fights, in the economical life, in the moral development; we pass despite you, as we passed despite Crispi; and we have the force to pass, winning your resistances, because arresting socialism is not possible without arresting that immense movement of transformation which operates into the society and has an impact in consciences. Socialism, Mr. Starabba, is not a chimera of deludes who want to remould the world accordingly their dream, but it is the clear and precise consciousness of the imperious necessities which are urgently needed, in the practice of life, by the majority of men. (...)

Well: socialism is not but the reflection and the formula of this thought, that experience of sufferings and daily fights educates in the working masses. Or you may rather send your policemen in places where that thought is elaborated, send them to dismantle organization of workers and socialist clubs; you may, committing crimes under your penal code, suppress for workers and socialists the elementary rights of reunion, speak and association promised by your Statute; you may make again the right to strike as a crime, welding again the collar of servants to the necks of modern wage earners, in disfigurement to the principles declared by the bourgeois revolution; you may indulge your whim of sending some socialist in jail or in the isles; you can meditate, as representative of a class went to power with plebiscites, how many attempts you like against the popular suffrage; you can do all of that and much more, but you can not make that those acts of brutal reaction would not demonstrate, also more clearly, that the cause of workers emancipation and the cause of socialism are all one with the cause of freedom of thought and of the civil progress. [...]

Does it seems therefore to you that we pass, Marchese?

— Leonida Bissolati

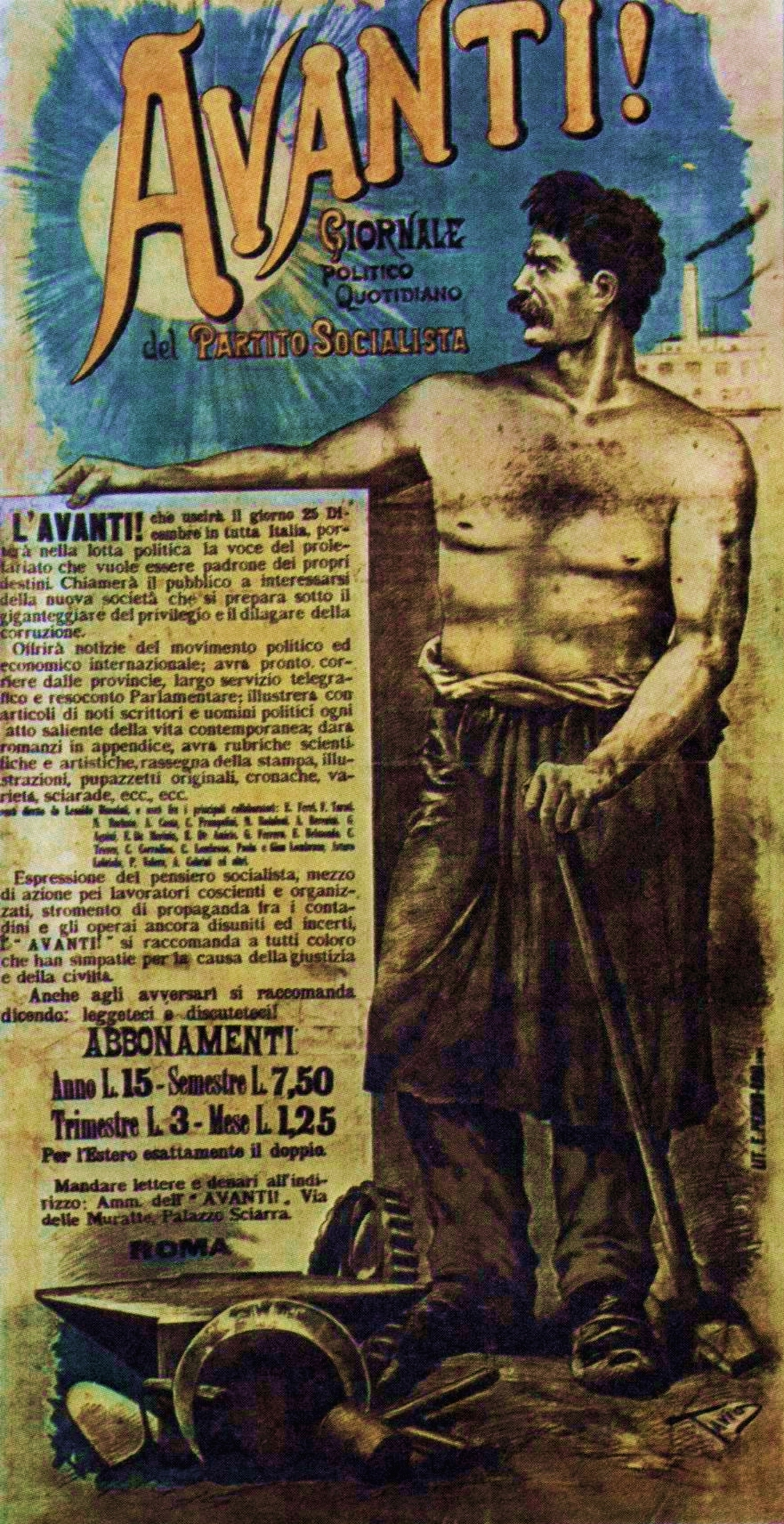
Advertising poster for the subscription to Avanti!, 1896

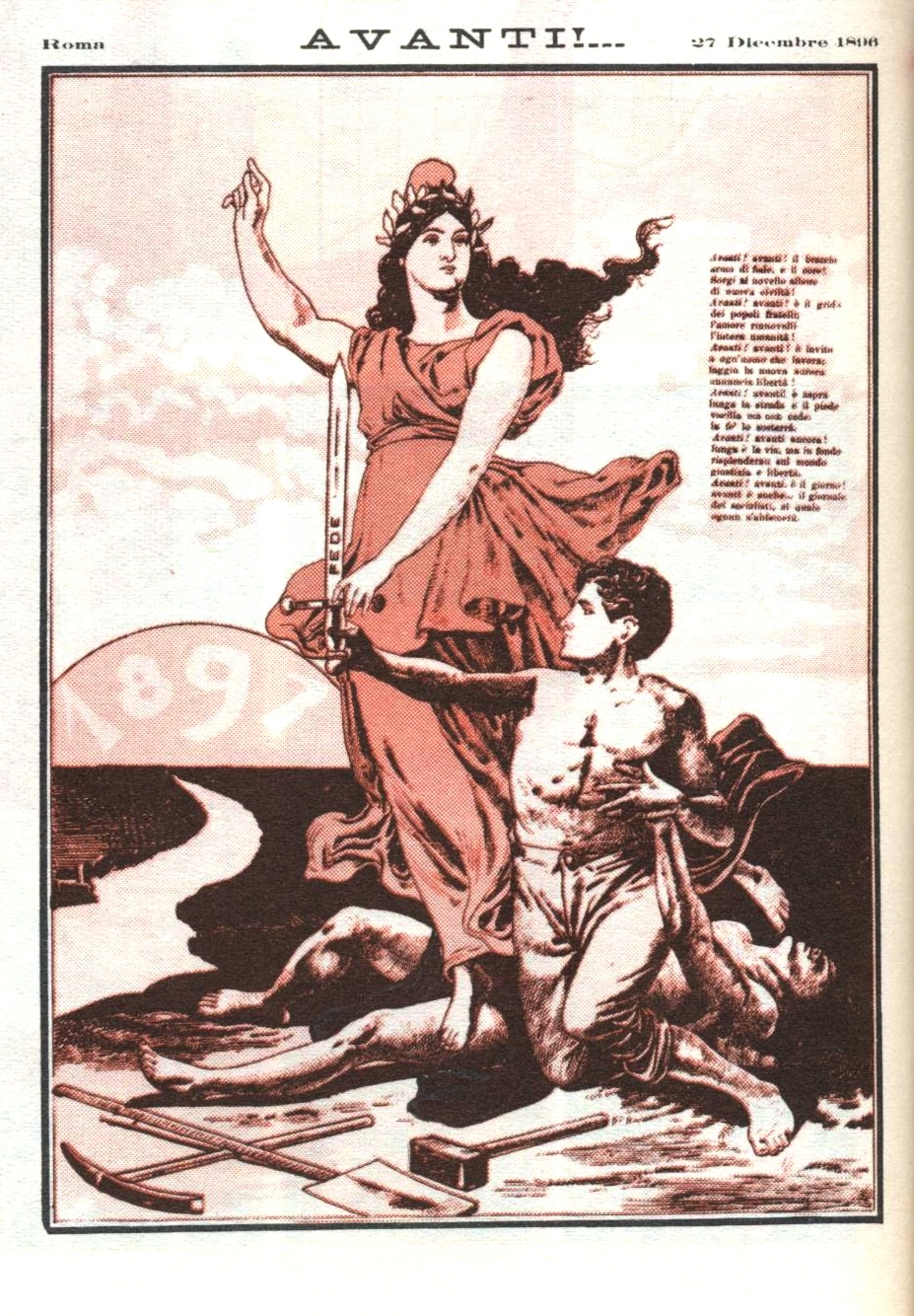
Advertising of Avanti!, 27 December 1896

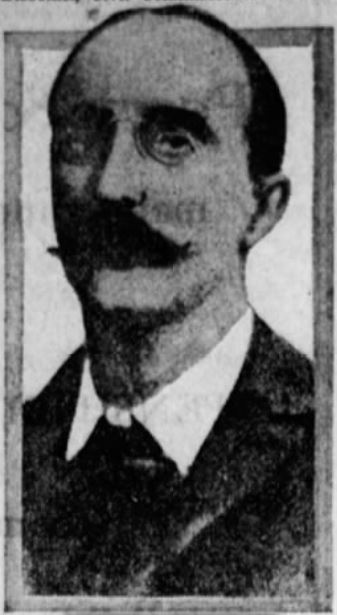
Portrait of Leonida Bissolati, first director of Avanti! in 1896

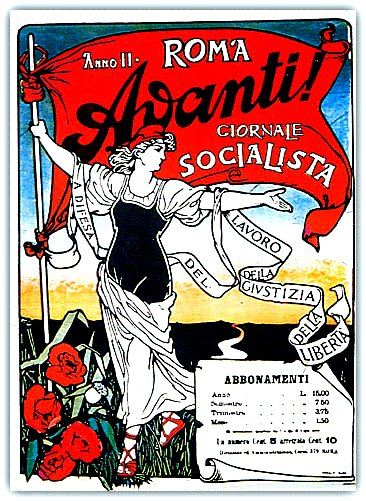
Advertising poster drawn by Gabriele Galantara for the subscription to Avanti!, 1898

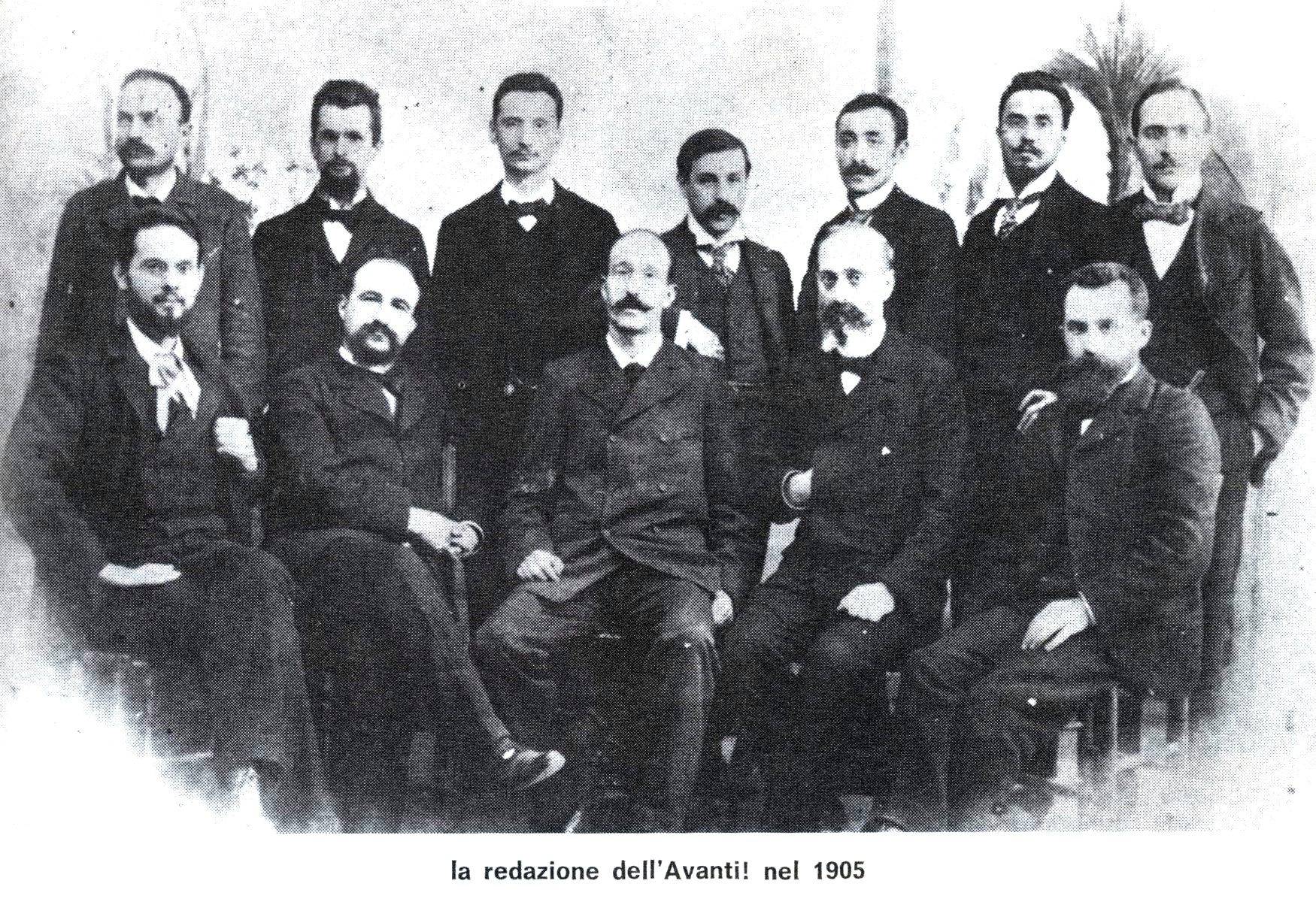
Editorial staff of Avanti! in 1905. From the left, seated, the first is satirical artist Gabriele Galantara and the second is Ivanoe Bonomi. At the middle there is the director Leonida Bissolati.

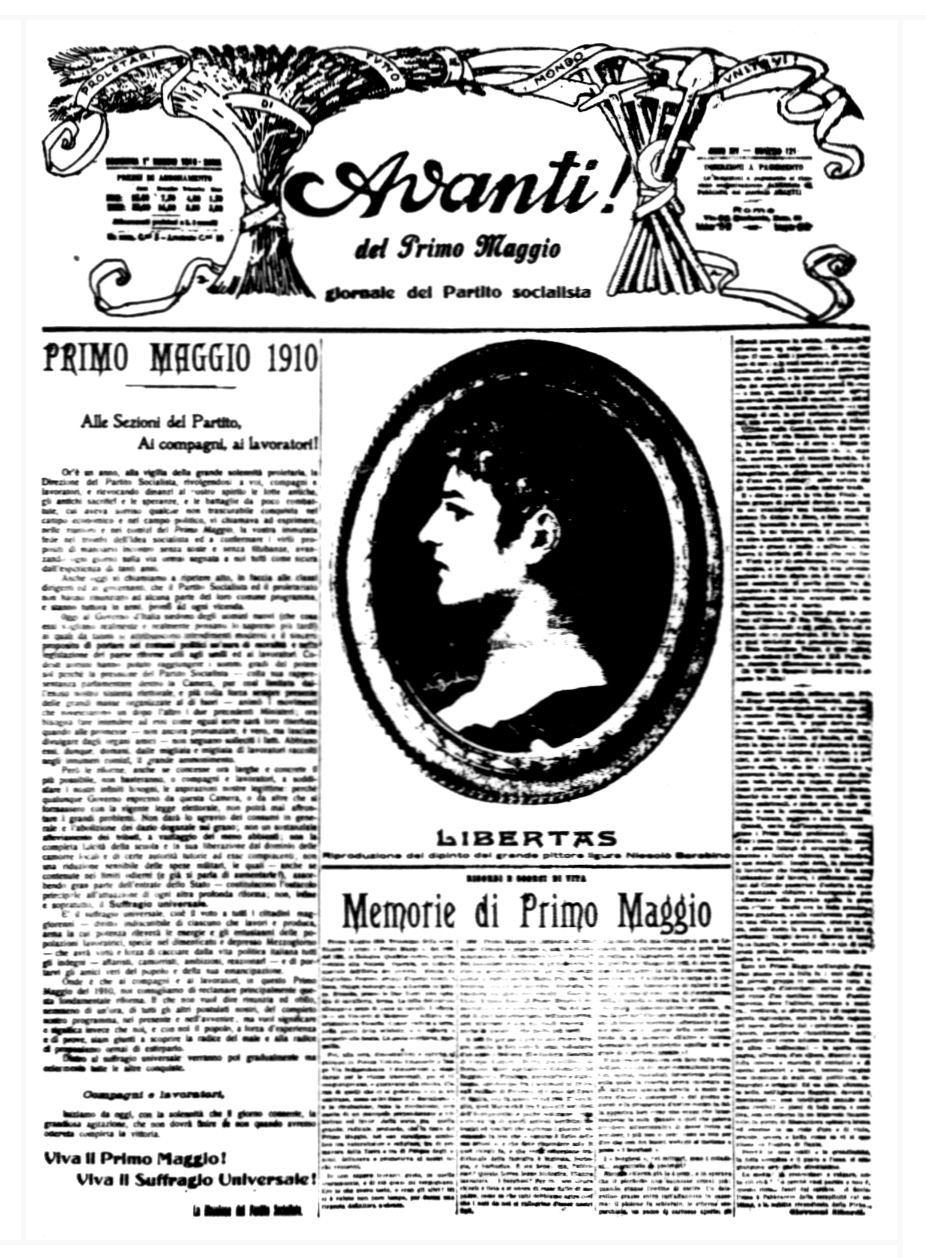
Avanti! of 1º May 1910

=== Format, prize and headquarters ===
The socialist daily newspaper was formed by four broadsheet pages. One copy cost 5 cents of lira, the annual subscription 15 lire, the six-monthly one 7.50 lire, the quarterly one 3 lire and the monthly one 1.25 lire.

The headquarters was located in Rome, in Palazzo Sciarra-Colonna of Via delle Muratte. In 1911, on the initiative of Turati, the headquarters of the newspaper was moved from Rome (where an office for parliamentary chronicle remained) to Milan, in Via San Damiano.

The number of pages became six, including news of Milan.

=== Repression of 1898 ===
From January to May 1898, several popular protests blew up in almost all the Italian peninsula, for bread, work and against taxes, but the government suppressed the revolts. On 7 May in Milan, the government declared the state of siege and gave full powers to general Fiorenzo Bava-Beccaris, who ordered to open fire against the crowd. Hundreds of people were killed and thousands were injured. The exact number of victims has not never been clarified.

On 9 May, general Bava-Beccaris, with the support of the government, dismantled associations and clubs considered subversives and arrested thousands of people belonging to socialist, republican and anarchical organizations, including some parliamentarians: among others, they were Filippo Turati (with his partner Anna Kuliscioff), Andrea Costa, Leonida Bissolati, Carlo Romussi (radical) and Paolo Valera.

All anti-government journals and newspapers were banned and on 12 May the entire redaction of Avanti! was arrested in Rome.

=== Avanti! and the Red Week ===
On 7 June 1914, in Ancona, an antimilitarist meeting was held in the local headquarter of the Italian Republican Party, organized by Pietro Nenni, a republican leader at the time and director of the local journal Lucifero, along with the anarchist Errico Malatesta. At the end, Carabinieri opened fire on the participants while they were leaving the hall, killing two republicans and an anarchist. As a reaction, The Chamber of Work declared a general strike and various revolts occurred. On 9 June, a great crowd took part to the funerals of the three killed which crossed the whole city. The news about the slaughter spread throughout all Italy and provoked demonstrations, parades and spontaneous strikes.

In particular, souls were inflamed by the calls of Benito Mussolini, socialist at the time and director of Avanti!, who had caught in Ancona, during the XIV Congress of PSI from 26 to 28 April 1914, an important personal success, with plaudits for the results of dissemination and sells of the party newspaper, granted to him personally by congress members.

On the number of 8 June 1914 of the socialist newspaper, Mussolini wrote:

In cities and in fields the answer to the provocation will raise spontaneous. We do not go through the events, neither we feel authorized to track the course, but we have the duty to second and flank them.[..] And we hope that with their action the Italian workers will be able to say that it is the time to make it end.

— Benito Mussolini

With his articles, Mussolini, by leveraging on his popularity inside the socialist movement and on the great diffusion of the newspaper, forced the Confederazione Generale del Lavoro (CGdL) to declare a general strike, an instrument which stopped every activity in the country and that the labour union believed it had to be used only in exceptional circumstances. Mussolini exploited the popular revolts for political purposes within the socialist movement: leadership of PSI was in the hands of revolutionary maximalists after the congress of Ancona, but reformist were still the majority in the parliamentary group and in CGdL.

On 10 June 1914, a political rally was held in the Arena di Milano in front of 60,000 people, while the rest of Italy was struggling and paralysed, Romagna and Marche were insurgent and rail workers finally announced to join to the general strike. After reformists of all parties said that the strike was not the revolution but only a manifestation against the massacre of Ancona, and that they would not be dragged into a useless carnage, Filippo Corridoni and Mussolini intervened. The latter exalted the revolt and his speech was reported and published by Avanti! on the following day:

In Florence, in Turin, in Fabriano there are other deaths and other injured, it is necessary to work into the army to avoid shootings on workers, it is necessary that the money of the soldier will be soon a fact accompli. [...] The general strike had been from 1870 to today the most serious revolt that had shaken the third Italy. [...] It was not a strike for defense, but for offense. The strike had an aggressive attitude. Crowds that once did not even dare to come into contact with the public force, this time they were able to resist and fight with a non-expected impetus. Here and there the striking multitude had gathered around those barricades that rehashers of an Engels phrase had relegated, with an hurry which betrayed devious concerns, if not the fear, between the relics of the romances of the fifteenth century. Here and there, always denoting the trend of the movement, shops of gunsmiths have been assaulted; here and there fires have flamed and not just of the taxes as in first revolts in the Mezzogiorno, here and there churches had been invaded. [...] If – buy any chanceo – instead of Mr. Salandra, there was Mr. Bissolati at the Presidency of the Council, we would have made the general strike of protest even more violent and definitely insurrectionalist. [...] Especially a cry has been launched and followed by an attempt, the cry of: "To the Quirinal!".

— Benito Mussolini

To prevent the monarchy from feeling threatened and declaring the state of siege, giving public powers to the army, the CGDL concluded the strike after 48 hours and invited workers to resume their activities.

That move frustrated the warlike and insurrectionist purposes of Mussolini who, on the Avanti! of 12 June 1914, accused the syndicalist leaders of felony saying: "The Labour Confederation, in ending the strike, has betrayed the revolutionary movement."

The general strike lasted only two days, while the revolutionary movement was gradually running out after keeping entire zones of the country in check.

On 20 June 1914, the socialist parliamentary group, formed in majority by moderates and reformists, disproved Mussolini about the events of the "Red Week" and confirmed the traditional gradualist and parliamentary position of the "historical" leadership of PSI, saying that the revolt was:

[...] the fatal and also too expected consequence of the foolish policy of the Italian leaderships, whose blind stubbornness on replacing to the urgent economical and social reforms the illegal militarist and pseudo-colonialist wasting frustrates the work of education and discipline of the Socialist Party for the gradual transformation of the political and social orders and rehabilitates the cult of violence within the masses [...] [in contrast with] [...] the fundamental concept of modern international, right which the great civil and social transformations and the emancipation of proletariat from the capitalist serfdom in particular are not achieved with the tantrum of disorganized crowds, whose fail revives and re-energizes the most evil and stupid movements of interior reactionism. It is then necessary to remain more than ever on the parliamentary field and in the propaganda among the masses within the most decisive opposition against all the militarist, fiscal and protectionist addresses of the government and to watch over for the defense to the bitter end at any cost of the settled public freedoms, intensifying at the same time the assiduous and patient work, the only which is really revolutionary, of education, intellectualisation of the proletarian movement.

At the end of the same month, on 28 June 1914, the assassination of Archduke Franz Ferdinand in Sarajevo shifted Italian attention on the European dynamics which will lead to World War I, opposing interventionist to neutralist, until the entry into war of Italy on 24 May 1915.

=== Avanti! during WWI ===
In 1914–1915, Avanti! supported an important campaign for the absolute neutrality towards the opposite sides in WWI.

After maintaining that position, decided by the vast majority of PSI, Benito Mussolini pushed the socialist newspaper into an interventionist campaign with his articles as director. Thanks to his retinue within the party, Mussolini asked to the national direction of PSI to endorse his new line or otherwise he would resign, as he did in the following day.

The new interventionist newspaper of Mussolini, Il Popolo d'Italia, would be published on 15 November 1914, with syndicalists and dissidents from the Socialist Party.

On 23 November, Mussolini was expelled from the Socialist Party and the satirical cartoonist of Avanti!, Giuseppe Scalarini, drew the cartoon Giuda for the newspaper, representing Mussolini, with a dagger and the money of betrayal, approaching silently to hit Christ (the socialism) in the back.

Giacinto Menotti Serrati was appointed as new director of Avanti! during all the WWI, and he was one of the leaders of the maximalist side of PSI and he adhered, in 1924, to the diktat of Lenin and Trotsky, joining the Communist Party of Italy.

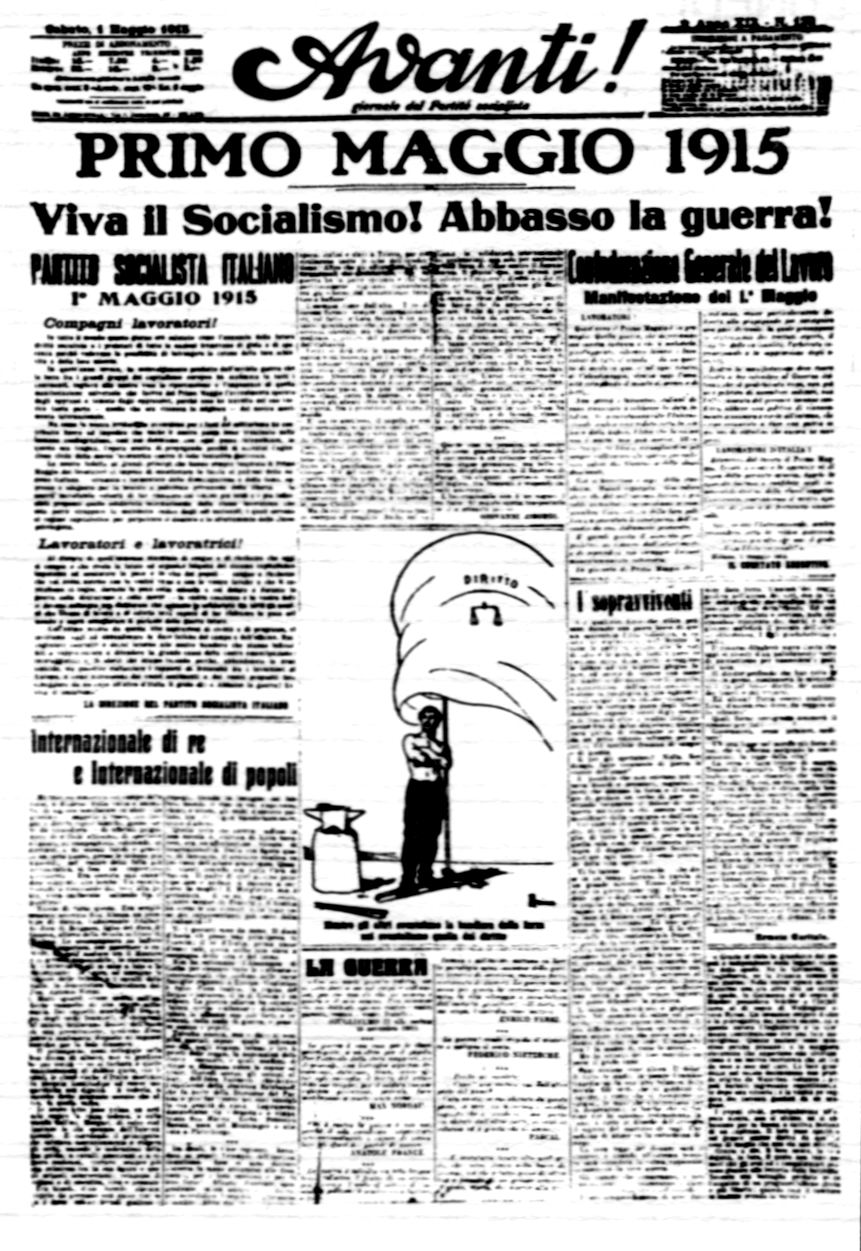
Avanti! of 1 May 1915

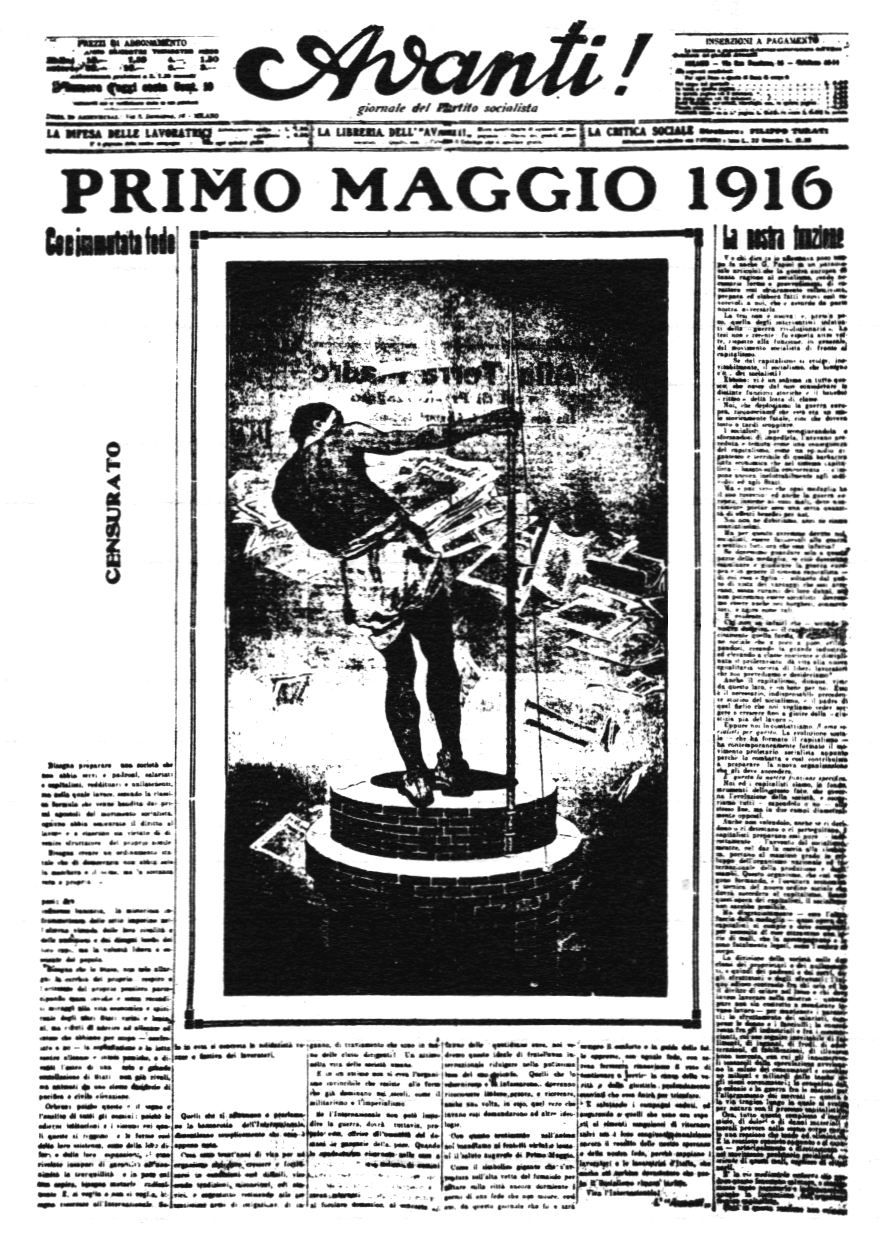
Avanti! of 1 May 1916 with censor cuts

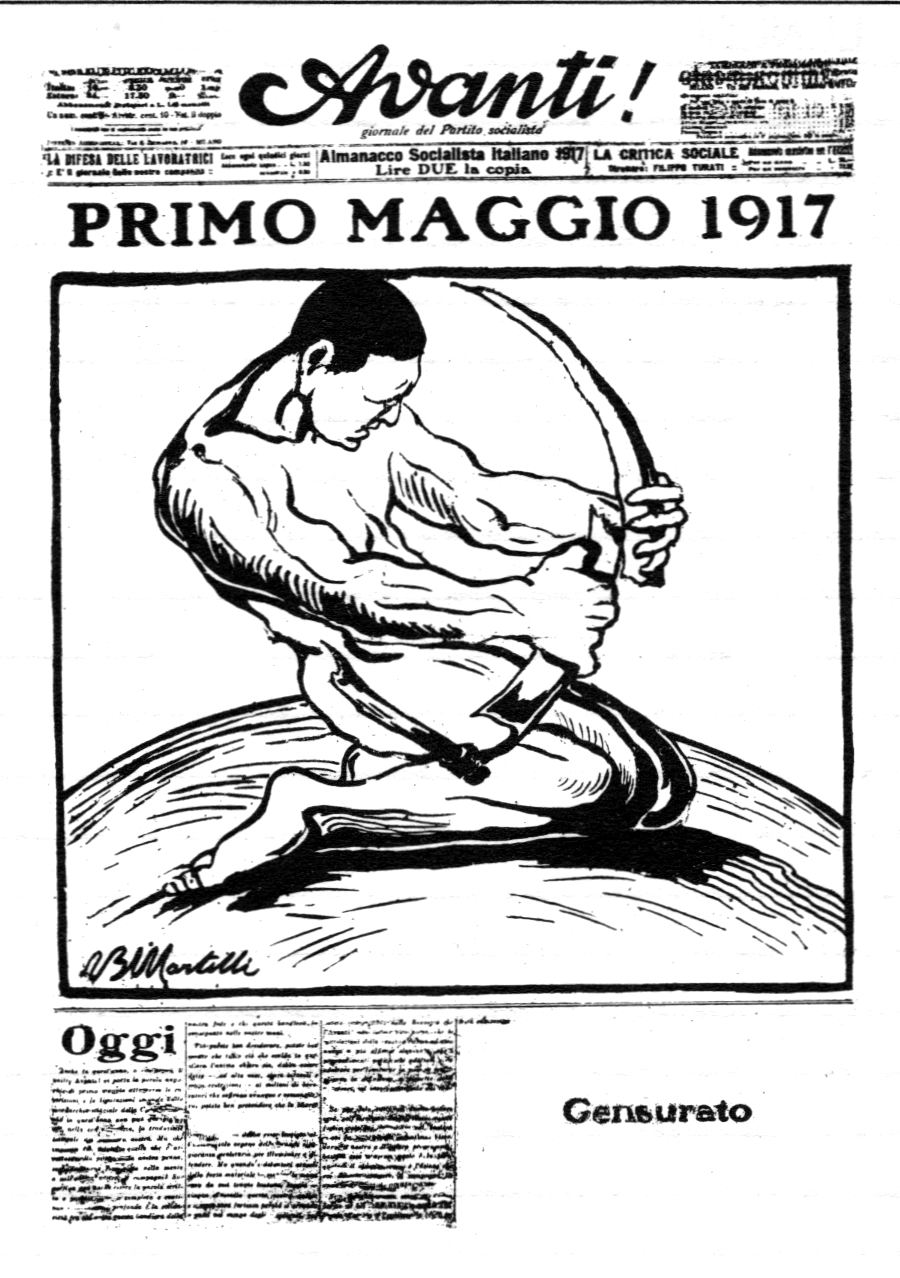
Avanti! of 1 May 1917 with censor cuts

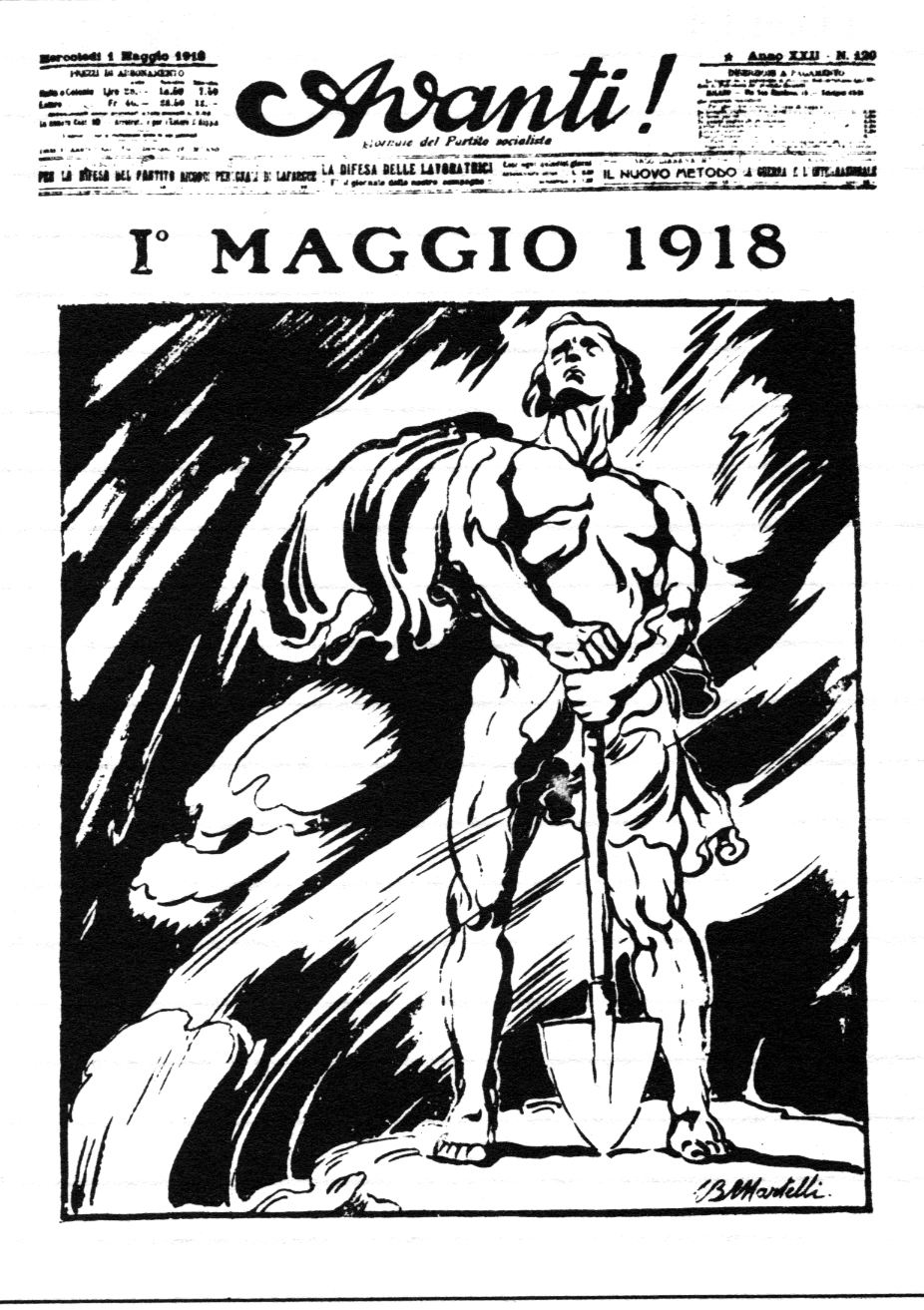
Avanti! of 1 May 1918

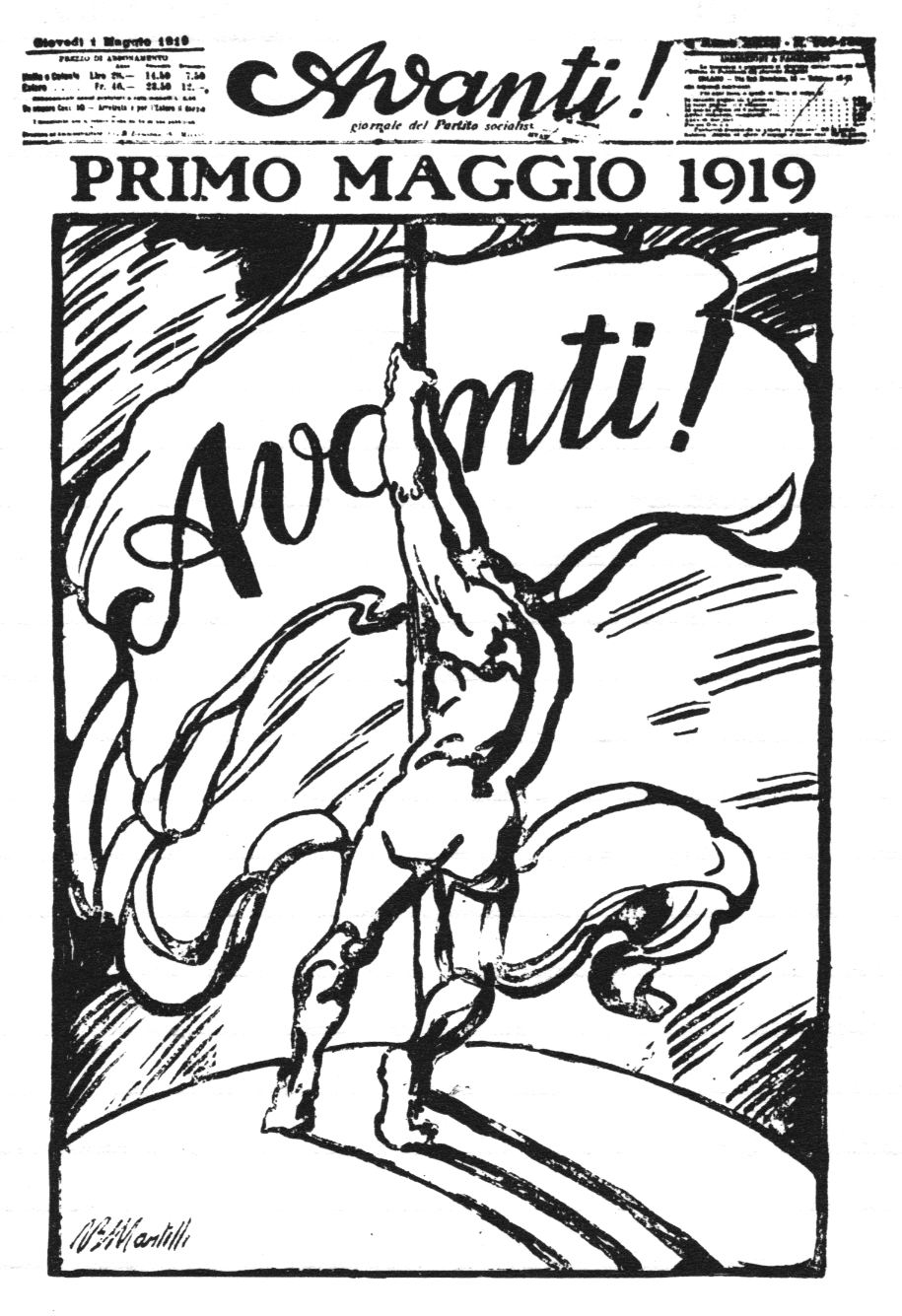
Avanti! of 1 May 1919

=== Five squadrist assaults against Avanti! ===
Between 1919 and 1922, Avanti! was attacked and devastated by five squadrist assaults:

The Avanti! is the symbol and the flag of anti-fascism. It is its more efficient fight instrument. But since that the fight is a bloody civil war, the daily newspaper is also at the centre of the war itself: it is a blockhouse to be sieged, intimidated and conquered according to the squadrismo. There is more: a strong emotive charge. Because if Avanti! is the idol of socialists, for Mussolini it is personally the object of a great love which have been transformed, after the traumatic clash of 1914, into envy and inner hate. The newspaper had been besieged and put on fire five times between 1919 and 1922. And every time it rises from the ashes: even in 1921, ro be moved in a new, huge headquarter. Around its rotary presses and linotype machines, there are shootings, stabbings, beatings, clashes between redactors and fascists, between soldiers and squadrists, fire of machine guns, dead and injured.

Journalists, employees, typographers live in tension and peril. There are revolvers in drawers. The telephone is used also to call for help the comrades. All the assaults have the same story, the same comments, the same mechanics, the same consequences: a script similar, more in general, to the civil war one. Every time that political circumstances suggest it or allow it, fascism attack. The aggressors are militarily organized, while defenders are not. Squadrists prepare themselves with pickaxes and incendiary bombs because the goal is already the devastation of the newspaper to prevent the publication of it. The defence of Avanti! is passive, like in all the other episodes of the civil war. In a more or less open way, assailants are almost always protected [...] by forces of the State. In the aftermath of the assaults, the newspaper preaches caution, suggests to not fall into the trap of provocations.

The reaction to the squadrist violence is indeed exclusively political and propagandistic: huge strikes and solidarity parades. Along with an extraordinary subscription to support the newspaper, repair the damages and relaunch it. It is the way of socialists, absolutely loser. But maybe obliged, considering that the force is on the side of squadrismo, because it has a now growing supply of money, thanks to the support of agrarians and industrials, and mostly because it has a coverage of the State power which becomes complete over time.

— Ugo Intini, Avanti! Un giornale, un'epoca

==== Assault against Avanti! of 15 April 1919 in Milan ====
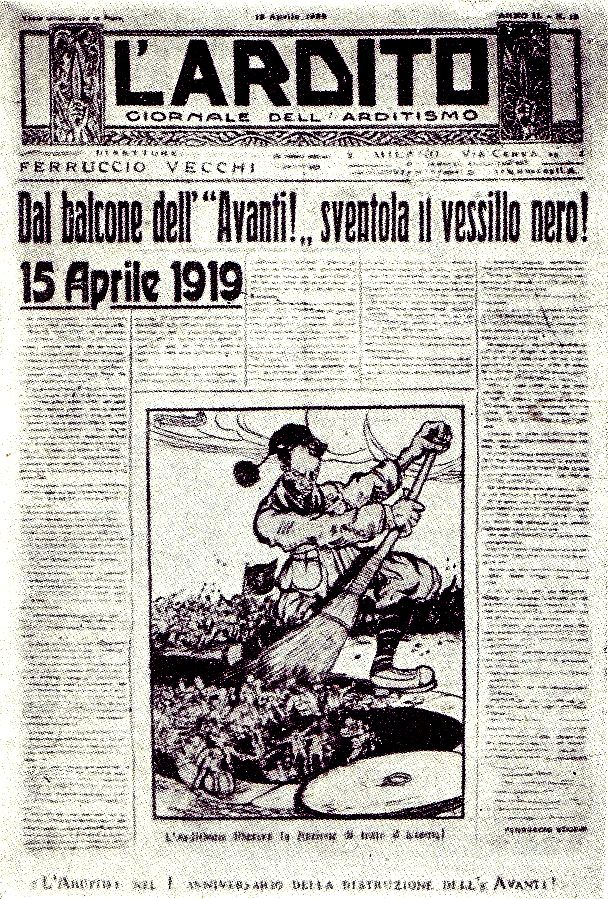
L'Ardito, the Arditi newspaper, of 18 April 1920 exalted the anniversary of the first squadrist attack against Avanti! on 15 April 1919 in Milano.

On 15 April 1919, in Milan, nationalists, fascists, officer cadets and Arditi were responsible for the first squadristi assault, during which they burnt down the headquarters of Avanti!. Under the title Viva l'Avanti! ("Long live Avanti!"), the first comment about the fact said:

We know that the fight is without quarter, we know that in this fight we represent, with our glorious Avanti!, the most shining flag of one of the sides; we can not raise any voice of astonishment if this flag has been marked as the target of the enemies, if it has been hit, if it has been dropped for a while.
But Avanti! can not be faded, because it represents the socialism itself. An idea can not be suppressed like a hammer can destroy the machine which spreads it to thousands of workers in workshops and fields. And because the idea is alive, the machine rebuilds itself too. Forward! Forward! Therefore. [...] At Avanti! we actively work so that, from its ashes and coals, our flag resumes to wave higher. There is the fever of recovery, ready and firm. There is the burning will to answer to a lot of manifestations of affection with the concrete demonstration that barabbism can not extinguish the voice of proletarian interests.

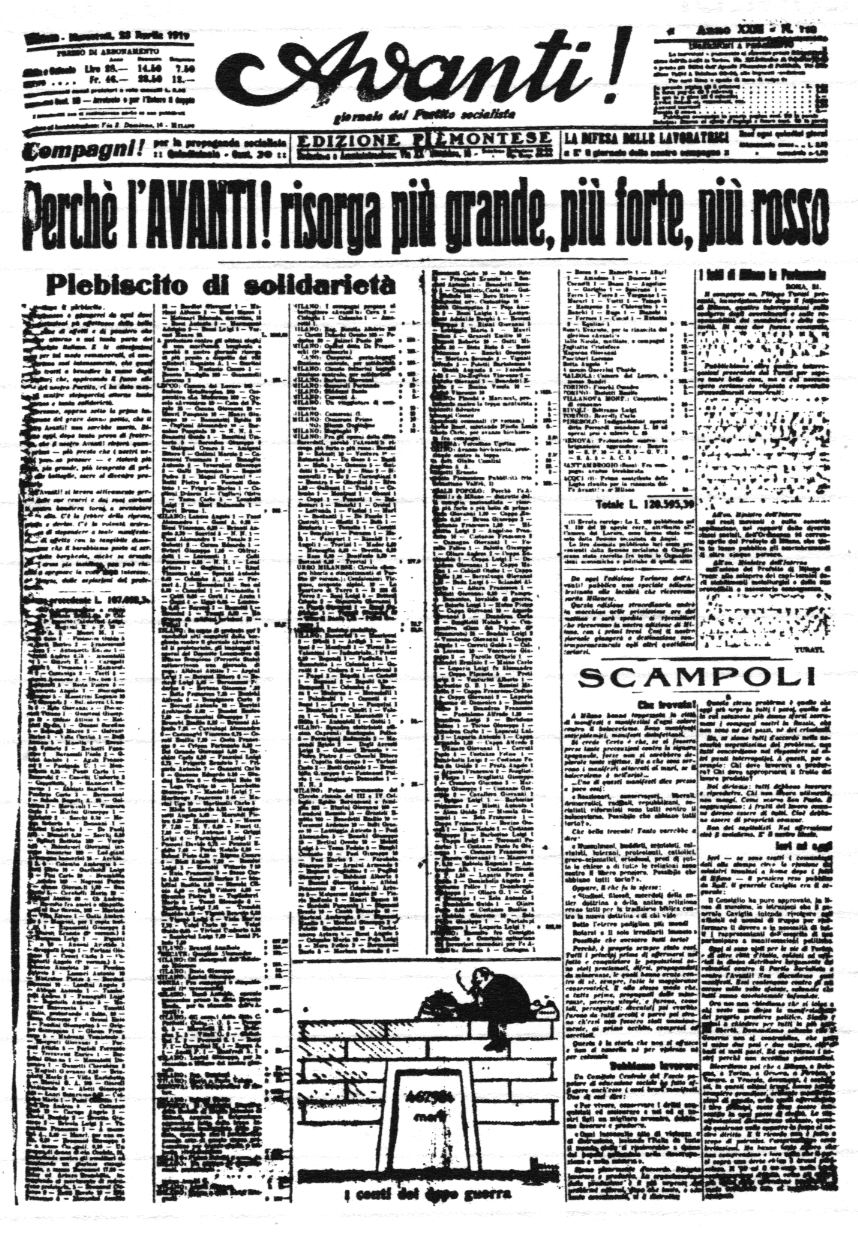
Launch of the popular subscription for the construction of the new headquarter for Avanti! after the squadrist assaults, 23 April 1919

On 23 April 1919, the newspaper, printed in Turin, launched a "solidarity plebiscite" urging its readers and militants to subscribe to support the rebuilding of the Milan headquarters. On 3 May 1920, Avanti! reappeared in the city.

==== Attack on the Roman headquarters of Avanti! ====
In July 1920, the headquarter of Avanti! in Rome was besieged by a group of Arditi during clashes with workers and tram drivers who were doing a strike. Ugo Intini wrote:

The headquarter of the Party direction, located in via del Seminario, is under siege. Then the main action, planned, is triggered: the assault on Avanti!. Complicity of police is so noticeable that even the superintendent will declare: "Agents had had a behaviour at least equivocable."

A policeman makes as the lookout in the corner of Via della Pilotta, where the headquarter of Avanti! is apparently protected by a cavalry squadron. He sees a crowd mowing and he erroneously believes that it is formed by workers come into the house of the people to defend their newspaper. He signals to Carabinieri on horseback to charge and dispel them. But when they acknowledge that it is the team of fascists, army-men stop, go back and let them pass. At head of assailants there is a captain of Arditi in uniform. "Door of the typography" – as read on the chronicle of Avanti! – "were soon smashed with large boulders. And while a group entered from the door, an Arditi officer, valorous!, came from the window handing a dagger and moved towards some women, the only one inside the typography, employed in shipping. The unfortunate, seeing that big man, ran to the roofs and hid themselves, scantily dressed and terrorized, into one of the locals near the post office. Inside the typography every was turned upside down. Machines were seriously damaged. Also two linotypes were made almost useless. Typefaces inside cassette are all lost."

While devastation happens, the officers who commands Carabinieri on horseback remains motionless: "I have no orders". A worker then run towards the Divisional command. He success breathless to talk with the commander of the picket. "I can not do anything" – he repeats – "we do not have orders."

— Ugo Intini, Avanti! Un giornale, un'epoca

==== Bombs against the new headquarter in Milan ====
A new attack occurred in Milan during the night between 23 and 24 March 1921: the new headquarter in Via Lodovico da Settala 22 was devastated by bombs thrown by a fascist squad, with the purpose of an immediate retaliation to the massacre of Hotel Diana, provoked a few hours before by some anarchists.

In this occasion, Pietro Nenni, still a republican leader at the time, intervened in favour of the socialist newspaper. Director Giacinto Menotti Serrati, after a few days, asked him to go in Paris as correspondent for Avanti!, in trial for six months.

=== Pietro Nenni at Avanti! ===
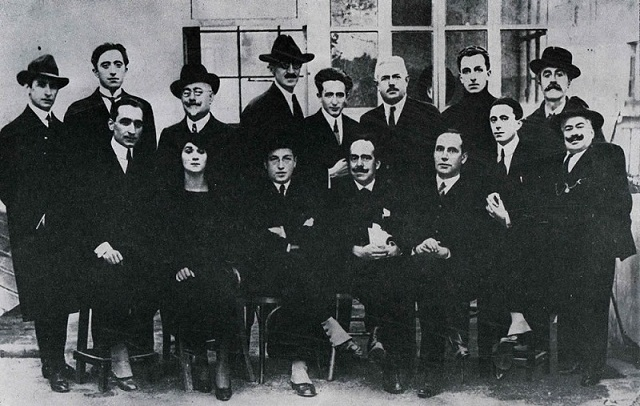
Editorial staff of Avanti! in Milan, 1921. The first sitting on the left of secretary Fasano is Guido Mazzali. The third sitting from left, with gaiters, is Pietro Nenni, and on his side, with moustaches and glasses, there is Walter Mocchi. The first above on the right is the satirical cartoonist Giuseppe Scalarini, with Giuseppe Romita sitting in front of him.

On 19 April 1921, Nenni signed his first article for the socialist newspaper under the title of "The failure of Versaglia policy".

In Paris, Nenni subscribed to PSI and began a path which, in around two years, would lead him to the leadership of the autonomist side of the Party. During the Congress of Milan in 1923, it was in favour of the merger between PSI and the Communist Party of Italy, as imposed by the Soviets and supported by Serrati and the Party secretary Costantino Lazzari. The congress appointed Nenni as new director of Avanti!.

Since then, during the whole exile in France and the period of underground in Italy, the relationship between Pietro Nenni and Avanti! had become stronger until 1948.

On 31 December 1925, the Mussolini Cabinet made the law n. 2037 on press passed by the Chamber of the Deputies and on 31 October 1926 the newly established fascist regime closed all the publications issued by the opposition. Avanti!, like all the other antifascist newspapers, was obliged to interrupt their prints in Italy but continued to be published in exile, under the impulse of Nenni, in Paris and Zürich every week.

=== Fall of fascism and 1946 referendum ===
==== Underground Avanti! ====
The socialist newspaper reappeared in Italy in hiding on 11 January 1943: a publication named Avanti!, without using the historical header with an italic type in liberty style, was distributed as the giornale del Movimento di Unità Proletaria per la repubblica socialista ("newspaper of the Movement of Proletarian Unity for the socialist republic").

After the establishment of the Italian Socialist Party of Proletarian Unity (PSIUP) on 22 August 1943 (with the merger between the Italian Socialist Party and the Movement of Proletarian Unity), Avanti! began to use again the traditional header of Galantara, proclaiming itself as the giornale del Partito Socialista Italiano di Unità Proletaria ("newspaper of the Italian Socialist Party of Proletarian Unity").

Giving the news of the stipulation of the Armistice of Cassibile, the issue n. 2 of the 47th year, published on 9 (incorrectly printed as 3) September 1943, was entitled La guerra fascista è finita ("The fascist war is over"), while the subheading said La lotta dei lavoratori continua ("The struggle of workers continues") mocking the Badoglio Proclamation of 25 July (la guerra continua, "The war continues").

Avanti! of 16 March 1944, printed and distributed illegally in the territories of the Italian Social Republic and whose occupied by Nazi Germany, proclaimed: La classe operaia in prima fila nella lotta per l'indipendenza e per la libertà ("The workers' class in the front row in the fight for independence and freedom"), with the sub-header: Lo sciopero generale nell'Italia Settentrionale contro la coscrizione, le deportazioni e le decimazioni ("The general strike in Northern Italy against conscription, deportations and decimations").

The Roman edition of clandestine Avanti! was edited by Eugenio Colorni and Mario Fioretti, as Sandro Pertini remembered:

[...] I remember how Colorni, my unforgettable brother of election, did all what he could to ensure the regular publication of Avanti!. He personally, taking every kind of risks, not only wrote main articles but he also cared for printing and distribution, helped in that by Mario Fioretti, flaming soul and generous apostle of Socialism. For this task to which he had a particular feel because of his preparation and mental ability, Colorni dedicated all himself, without however leaving also the most modest assignments in the political and militar organization of our Party. He loved deeply the newspaper and dreamed to direct our editorial staff after the Liberation and only if was not taken away by the fascist ferocity, he would be the first editor-in-chief of Avanti! in the freed Rome and today he would be its director, supported in this task not only by his strong genius and his wide culture, but also by his deep honesty and that sense of justice which had always guided his actions. For his work and the one of Mario Fioretti, Avanti! was, among the clandestine newspapers, the one with more mordant and it was capable to explain more clearly the problems regarding working masses. His publication was waited anxiously and not only by us, but also by many members of other parties, who saw their interest better represented on Avanti!

— Sandro Pertini

The newspaper was published in clandestinity in Rome until the liberation of the Italian capital on 4–5 June 1944.

The extraordinary edition of 7 June 1944 gave the news about the La Storta massacre of 4 June, heading: Bruno Buozzi Segretario della Confederazione Generale del Lavoro assassinato dai nazisti con 14 compagni ("Bruno Buozzi secretary of General Confederation of Labour murdered by Nazis along with 14 comrades").

Avanti! resumed the public diffusion in Rome and the Italian territory gradually freed, while it remained illegal in the Social Republic.

Pertini was a protagonist in the printing and spreading of the first issue in Florence, immediately after the liberation of the city:

[...] Suddenly at the dawn of eleven August, "Martinella" – the old huge bell of Palazzo Vecchio – rang wildly; all bells of Florence answered festive. It was the signal of the rescue. Therefore we all took to the place; our brothers of Oltrarno passed on the right, partisans came from the hills, freedom finally brighted in the sky of Florence. We got to work immediately; all the comrades strived in an emotional way. Ours was the first party to publish a manifest dedicated to the citizenship and we thought to immediately issue the Avanti! under the direction of comrade Albertoni. [...] In the afternoon of eleven August, we all came out from the headquarter of the party of via San Gallo with packages of Avanti! just from the printers and we became newsboys. It was a huge success. I remember an old worker. He went towards me with arms outstretched and asked me an Avanti! with a trembling voice. His face, brighting of a light irradiated from his soul, seemed to be suddenly younger. Once taken the Avanti!, he took it to the mouth and kissed the header crying like a kid. It looked like a son who finds his mother after years of forced remoteness.

The Milan edition of the clandestine Avanti! was edited by Andrea Lorenzetti, until his arrest by Gestapo on 10 March 1944 along with almost all the socialist leadership group of Milan: in the period between September 1943 and May 1944, twenty-eight issues were published.

Immediately after the arrest of the editorial staff, the direction of the clandestine newspaper was given to Guido Mazzali, and thanks to his diligence Avanti! reached a circulation of 15,000 copies.

Sandro Pertini had remembered the diligence of Mazzali for the socialist newspaper:

The political and military organization of our Party proceeded feverlishly and increasingly satysifing in the North by the work of Morandi, Basso, Bonfantini. The soul of this organization was the clandestine Avanti!. In the north it was published in three different editions: in Milan, Turin, Venice, Genoa, Bologna. Along with Avanti!, other clandestine newspaper were released [...] The publication of those papers in Milan was due to the tenacity, self-denial and intelligence of Guido Mazzali. Always calm, he was not upset for my request to publish new newspapers: he quietly listened to my outbursts when I incited him to release the Avanti! more frequently and he patiently went to work. The newspaper was made by him, and he oversaw the preinting and spreading. Consider that in the sole Milan we succeeded to print up to 30,000 copies per number of Avanti!. Our newspaper was very famous, mostly because it was not limited to do patriottistic propaganda, as newspaper of other parties did, but it always showed those things which would then be and would be the purpose of the liberation war, i.d. independence, republic, socialismo. [...]

Giuseppe Manfrin wrote:

[...] In the late afternoon of 25 April 1945, a gentleman, breathless and with a distinct aspect, went around the arose Milan, with a shabby bicycle and a bag full of papers which were nothing other than material to publish on the newspaper. This gentleman was Guido Mazzali who was crossing Milan to reach the Corriere della Sera. On the next day, the 26 April 1945, the first normal number of Avanti! finally came to the sunlight after twenty years. [...]

— Giuseppe Manfrin, Mazzali Guido: la tensione etica'

The Milan edition of Avanti! had been edited in the headquarter of Corriere della Sera until 13 May 1945, when the editorial staff moved to Via Senato 38, corner of Piazza Cavour, 2, in the former office of Il Popolo d'Italia.

==== Return to the news-stands ====
On 27 April 1945, while the Northern Italy was being freed from the German occupation, an article signed by Pietro Nenni was published by Avanti! with the title Vento del Nord ("Wind of North"). The leader of PSIUP, exalting the struggle of partisans who succeeded in ousting or forcing the surrender of nazi fascists, found, within the will of redemption and renovation of northern people, the "wind" which would have swept away the residuals of the regime that governed Italy for over twenty years, a "liberation wind against the enemy from outside and those from inside".

On 28 April 1945, news about the execution of Mussolini reached Rome and Sandro Pertini told that Nenni, brotherly friend and jail-mate of the duce in the past during his socialist period, "had red eyes, he was very moved, but he wanted to dictated the title anyway: Justice is done!».

On 1 May 1945, after the liberation, the first number of Avanti! was published in Milan and it was dedicated to the International Workers' Day for the first time in twenty years with an historical political rally of Sandro Pertini. On the front-page, there was an article with photo portraying Bonaventura Ferrazzutto, under the title Gli assenti ("The missing ones"), where comrades fallen or victims of the deportation in Nazi Extermination camps were remembered.

==== Fight for the Republic ====
After the liberation, Avanti! built an important instrument of propaganda promoting the vote in favour of the republic for the 1946 Italian institutional referendum, thanks also to the articles written by Nenni, and for the PSIUP for the general elections both held on 2 June 1946.

On 5 June 1946, the newspaper proclaimed the results of the institutional referendum with the title: REPUBBLICA! – IL SOGNO CENTENARIO DEGLI ITALIANI ONESTI E CONSAPEVOLI È UNA LUMINOSA REALTÀ ("Republic! – The centennial dream of honest and aware Italians is a shining reality") In a dedicated section dedicated, director Ignazio Silone expressed the gratitude of socialist electors towards their leader, who fought for the pairing between the election for the Constitutional Assembly and the referendum, with the title Grazie a Nenni ("Thanks to Nenni").

=== Second post-war period ===
During the second post-war period, Avanti! had not reached the same circulation and influence obtained between the two wars but it became a witness, through its titles, of the rebuilding of Italy and its democratic evolution.

==== Center-left ====
The newspaper gave more emphasis on the creation of the first Italian center-left government with the direct participation of socialists after 16 years of opposition along with communist. On 6 December 1963, on the occasion of the oath of Moro I Cabinet with Antonio Segni as President of Italy, the front-page of Avanti! was entitled: DA OGGI OGNUNO È PIÙ LIBERO – I lavoratori rappresentati nel governo del Paese ("FROM TODAY EVERYONE IS MORE FREE – workers are represented in the government of the Country").

Avanti! continued to report the results of the reformative activity made by socialists within the center-left side of the government.

The number of 15 May 1970 was entitled LO STATUTO DEI LAVORATORI È LEGGE ("WORKERS' STATUTE IS NOW A LAW"), announcing the approval of law n. 300 promulgated on 22 May 1970, and the subheading stated: IL PROVVEDIMENTO VOLUTO DAL COMPAGNO GIACOMO BRODOLINI È STATO DEFINITIVAMENTE APPROVATO DALLA CAMERA ("The provision wanted by comrade Giacomo Brodolini has been definitely approved by the Chamber)". The newspaper remembered the role of the then socialist Minister of Labour, dead on 11 July 1969 and considered as the real "political father" of the Workers' Statute, and attacks "the attitude of communists, ambiguous and clearly electoral" which determined the Italian Communist Party (PCI) to prefer the abstention on the provision. The editorial proclaimed La Costituzione entra in fabbrica ("Constitution comes in factory"), underlining "the explicit recognition of a new reality which, after the great fall struggles, in the heart of struggles for social reforms, sees the working class at the offensive, engaged in the construction a more democratic society".

The similar title of the Avanti! issued on 1 December 1970 was IL DIVORZIO È LEGGE – Vittoriosa conclusione di una giusta battaglia ("DIVORCE IS LAW – Victorious conclusion of a right battle"), and it underlined the approval of the new Fortuna-Baslini Law, a result of the combination between the law proposal of socialist Loris Fortuna and another one of liberal Antonio Baslini. The Fortuna project was of 1965 and it was stubbornly repurposed by the socialist deputy at the beginning of every legislature in which Fortuna was elected.

On 14 May 1974, about three years after the approval of the law, the socialist newspaper proclaimed the result of the divorce referendum, promoted by Gabrio Lombardi, president of the Comitato per il referendum sul divorzio ("Committee for the divorce referendum"), and Luigi Gedda, president of Civic Committees, and supported by Vatican hierarchies and Amintore Fanfani, secretary of Christian Democracy at the time: the front page was covered by the title Una valanga di NO – Strepitosa vittoria delle forze democratiche ("An avalanche of NOs – Outstanding victory of democratic forces").

On 31 December 1975, Francesco De Martino wrote an editorial entitled Soluzioni nuove per una crisi grave ("New solutions for a serious crisis") which announced the withdrawal of PSI trust on Moro IV Cabinet, confirmed on 7 January 1976 and provoking the fall of the government.

==== From 1977 to 1994 ====
With the n.1 of 6 January 1977, Avanti! renovated its graphic layout: following the success of la Repubblica, which appeared in news-stands a year before, the socialist newspaper abandoned the traditional broadsheet format and adopted the tabloid one, the header had been coloured in red and the number of pages increased. The editorial, signed by director Paolo Vittorelli and entitled Anche questa volta si passerà ("We pass this time too"), made a reference to the article written by Bissolati on the first number of the newspaper in 1896 with the title Di qui si passa. It is one of the first signals of the new course of Bettino Craxi secretariat in PSI, who became himself the director of the socialist newspaper in 1978 with Ugo Intini as editor-in-chief.

In particular, Avanti! reacquired a certain fame among socialist during the eighties, thanks to the political analysis written by Craxi with the pseudonym of "Ghino di Tacco", a bandit of the 13th century.

In 1992, the Mani pulite judicial investigation began and PSI fell in a crisis which would lead to an electoral and financial collapse. In August of the same year, Avanti!, directly conditioned by Craxi, launched attacks on the activity of pool of magistrates working on Mani pulite.

Director Roberto Villetti resigned under request of the editorial staff committee by the National Direction of the Socialist Party for the disastrous management of the newspaper. Francesco Gozzano, already editor-in-chief, replaced Villetti.

In 1993, circulation of Avanti! fell from 200,000 copies to a few thousand. Wastes and bad management during the eighties, despite the important funding for the modernization of the newspaper strongly desired by Craxi, provoked an accumulation of debts for about 30–40 billions lire; Avanti! lost also the public contribution for publishing (6 billions lire) because it did not certify the financial statements for the 2 billions lire deficit, causing the revocation of bank loans and of the return request of debt exposures.

In March 1993 wages for employee were suspended for lacking funds.

Ottaviano Del Turco, new PSI Secretary from February 1993, tried to mediate a solution to avoid the closure of Avanti!. In August 1993, a series of fund-raising events were organised but the newspaper failed to revive. The company in charge of the newspaper Nuovo Editrice L'avanti! was formally declared bankrupt in March 1994 after the electoral collapse of the Italian Socialist Party which had failed to gain a minimum of 3% of the vote. The fact that the paper was a political newspaper and the influence of the Craxi in a way contributed to its fall when the PSI was hit by heavy corruption scandals. In October 1993, desks and typewriters were seized to pay 105 million lire. The newspaper was in a chronic crisis and closed in November 1993: after nine months of work without retributions, journalists not longer judged as credible the reassurance made by newspaper and party leaders and they ceased to come to the redaction by voting the start of bankruptcy procedure during an assembly.

Publishing house "Nuova Editrice Avanti!" was liquidated in January 1994.

=== After 1994 ===
With the dismantling of PSI, the newspaper fell under liquidation, as other assets of the party. The last congress, held in Rome on 12 November 1994, appointed a liquidator commissioner, Michele Zoppo, to whom was given Avanti among with other assets.

After that date, three different periodical appeared in news stands that, though all of them recalled to the historical socialist newspaper, were completely different politically aligned:

- In 1996, the clone newspaper L'Avanti! (with the "L") was published by the International Press of Valter Lavitola and directed by Sergio De Gregorio, founder in 2000 of the political movement Italians in the World and elected as senator with Italy of Values in 2006 and then with The People of Freedom in 2008. This newspaper ceased its publication after a few months and reappeared in 2003. Lavitola made of his periodical an instrument for political movements that had nothing in common with the editorial line of the original socialist newspaper. Furthermore, L'Avanti was close to the center-right premier Silvio Berlusconi. Lavitola and De Gregorio were investigated by prosecutor of Naples for criminal association aimed to fraud against the State: Lavitola, as de facto owner and co-administrator of International Press, and De Gregorio, as effective partner since 1997 and hidden co-administrator of the same company, along with other ten defendants, declared that the publisher of L'Avanti! had the requirements for obtaining the funds provided by the law for publishing, cashing illegally a total of €23,200,000 received between 1997 and 2009. For this crimes, Lavitola and De Gregorio suffered a preventive seizure of assets for €9 million in July 2012. On 9 November 2012 Lavitola negotiated a sentence of 3 years and 8 months in front of the Judge for preliminary investigations of the Court of Naples, while the process of De Gregorio, whom sentence was reduced to house arrest in his Roman apartment of Parioli following a failed re-election during the political election of 2013, was still in progress on 4 June 2015, with the request of plea bargaining by the former parliamentarian. Court of Accounts of Lazio, with sentence n. 24/2015 of 11 March 2015, condemned Valter Lavitola and Sergio De Gregorio to give back €23,879,000 to the State for the publishing funds obtained illegally by L'Avanti between 1997 and 2009.
- In 1998, Avanti! della domenica began to be published weekly as the body of Italian Democratic Socialists (SDI), sided on center-left, and it directly referred to the Sunday supplement of the historical Avanti!, issued between January 1903 and March 1907. After ceasing the publications in 2006, the weekly was issued again since 7 February 2010 (with Dario Alberto Caprio as editor-in-chief) as the official body of the new PSI (heir of SDI), member of Socialist International and the European Socialist Party. In this occasion, Ugo Intini, former director of Avanti!, greeted the new release of the socialist weekly with an editorial entitled Di qui si passa, quoting the title of the inaugural editorial wrote by Leonida Bissolati in 1896;
- In 2003, Fabrizio Cicchitto and other former socialists re-constructed Avanti!, with Bobo Craxi as director. Although this Avanti! was formally neutral, its former director was a close friend of another former socialist Gianni De Michelis, who was then secretary of the New Italian Socialist Party (NPSI). The NPSI, which was in coalition with the centre-right, was an antagonist of the socialists who found home in the centre-left led by the Italian Democratic Socialists, who created an opposing weekly paper with the name of Avanti della Domenica which however ran out of funds and closed soon after. In 2006, Fabio Ranucci becomes director and quickly defines the paper an independent "socialist" newspaper of information. However, with the re-composition of the small often tiny Socialist political formations into the modern-day Italian Socialist Party in 2007, the paper became strongly associated with the latter.

All the three periodicals are no longer published: L'Avanti! of Lavitola since 2011; Avanti! of Bobo Craxi merged in Avanti! della domenica in 2006 and the last one ceased the publications on 6 October 2013, following the creation of online newspaper Avanti! on 5 January 2012, thanks to the definitive reappropriation of the original Avanti! by the new PSI of Riccardo Nencini.

== Headquarters ==
- Rome, Palazzo Sciarra, Via delle Muratte (National headquarter: 1896 – 1897);
  - Via del Corso 397 (National headquarter: 1897 – 1898);
  - Via di Propaganda Fide 16 (National headquarter: 1898 – 1911);
- Milan, Via S. Damiano 16 (National headquarter: 9 October 1911 – 15 April 1919);
- Rome, Via del Seminario 86 (Roman edition: administration);
  - Via della Pilotta 11 (Roman edition: direction and typography);
- Milan, Via Ludovico da Settala 22 (National headquarter: 1921 – 1926);
- Paris, Rue de Picpus 126, 12th arrondissement (in exile, from 12 December 1926);
  - Rue de la Tour d'Auvergne 16, at Giorgio Salvi (9th arrondissement), (in exile, 1930);
  - Rue du Faubourg Saint-Denis, 103 (10th arrondissement), (Nuovo Avanti! in exile, since 1934);
- Milan, Via Solferino 28 (in the headquarter of Corriere della Sera occupied on 25 April 1945);
  - Via Senato 38, corner of Piazza Cavour, 2 (former headquarter of Il Popolo d'Italia. Milan edition: since 13 May 1945);
- Rome, Corso Umberto I 476 (National headquarter: 1945);
  - Via IV Novembre 145 (National headquarter: 1946);
  - Via Gregoriana, 41 (National headquarter: 1953);
  - Piazza Indipendenza, National headquarter: in cohabitation with la Repubblica;
  - Via Tomacelli 145, National headquarter: in the headquarter of the cultural center Mondoperaio;

== Directors ==
=== First generation ===
- Leonida Bissolati (1896–1903)
- Enrico Ferri (1903–1908)
- Oddino Morgari (1908–1909)
- Claudio Treves (1910–1912)
- Giovanni Bacci (July 1912 – October 1912)
- Benito Mussolini (1 December 1912 – October 1914)
- Giacinto Menotti Serrati (October 1914 – 1922)
- Pietro Nenni (1922–1926)

=== Exile ===
- Ugo Coccia (issued in exile in Paris, 12 December 1926 to 1928)
- Angelica Balabanoff (Paris, 1928 – 1930 and 1930 – 1940 under the maximalist Italian Socialist Party)
- Pietro Nenni (published by PSI – Labour and Socialist International Section in exile in Zürich, for a certain time as a supplement of L'Avvenire dei Lavoratori: 1930 – May 1934)
- Pietro Nenni (published by PSI – Labour and Socialist International Section in exile in Paris with the title of Il Nuovo Avanti: May 1934 – 1939)
- Giuseppe Saragat, Oddino Morgari and Angelo Tasca (collegiate management but de facto managed by Saragat: published by PSI – Labour and Socialist International Section in exile in Paris with the title of Il Nuovo Avanti: 1939 – 1940)
- Pietro Nenni (printed in clandestinity in Palalda, Pyrénées-Orientales, in the Vichy France: October 1941 – January 1943)

=== Return in Italy ===
- Eugenio Colorni (illegally in Rome: 22 August 1943 – May 1944)
- Andrea Lorenzetti (illegally in Milan: September 1943 – May 1944)
- Guido Mazzali (illegally in Milan: May 1944 – April 1945)
- Pietro Nenni, with director Giuseppe Saragat (issued in Rome after its liberation: June 1944 – January 1945)
- Guido Mazzali (Milan edition: April 1945 – 1951)
- Ignazio Silone (Roman edition: 1945 – 1946)
- Sandro Pertini (Roman edition: 1946 – 1947)
- Riccardo Lombardi (Roman edition: 1948 – 1949)
- Sandro Pertini (Roman edition: 1949 – 1951)
- Tullio Vecchietti (1951–1957)
- Tullio Vecchietti as political director, Carlo Bonetti as editor-in-chief (1957–1960)
- Giovanni Pieraccini as political director, Franco Gerardi as editor-in-chief (1960–1963)
- Riccardo Lombardi (12 December 1963 – 21 July 1964)
- Francesco De Martino (30 July 1964 – 13 November 1965)
- Franco Gerardi (14 November 1965 – 17 November 1966)
- Gaetano Arfé and Flavio Orlandi as political directors, Franco Gerardi as editor-in-chief (18 November 1966 – 21 January 1969)
- Gaetano Arfé as political director, Franco Gerardi as editor-in-chief (22 January 1969 – 1 April 1976)
- Paolo Battino Vittorelli (1976–1978)
- Bettino Craxi as political director, Ugo Intini as editor-in-chief (1978–1981)
- Ugo Intini (26 April 1981 – 6 October 1987)
- Antonio Ghirelli (28 October 1987 – 8 December 1989)
- Roberto Villetti as political director, Francesco Gozzano as editor-in-chief (9 December 1989 – 1992)
- Giorgio Benvenuto as political director with the co-director Giuseppe Garesio, Francesco Gozzano as editor-in-chief (1992–1993)

== Collaborators ==
- Ivanoe Bonomi
- Angiolo Cabrini
- Giovanni Merloni, chief editor
- Enrico Leone, chief editor
- Garzia Cassola
- Tomaso Monicelli, literary and theatre critic, father of director Mario Monicelli
- Arturo Labriola, for foreign section
- Antonio Gramsci
- Nicola Badaloni
- Vittorio Piva
- Rinaldo Rigola
- Gabriele Galantara, comic artist
- Giuseppe Scalarini, comic artist
- Umberto Boccioni, illustrator
- Gino Piva
- Cesare Pirisi
- Vincenzo Balzamo
- Rosa Genoni
- Walter Pedullà
- Franco Fortini
- Giulio Laroni
- Paolo Grassi
- Lino Miccichè
- Paola Peroni, editor
- Luca Bagatin
- Antonio Matasso
- Walter Tobagi, then special correspondent of Corriere della Sera, killed by Mario Marano and Marco Barbone of the Brigata XXVIII marzo on 28 May 1980
- Marco Sassano, already editor of student newspaper La zanzara of Milano
- Ugo Finetti
- Gaetano Tumiati
- Carlo Tognoli
- Francesco Forte
- Federico Mancini
- Paolo Pillitteri
- Nunzio Dell'Erba
- Bobo Craxi

== Still existing newspapers ==
The title of the newspaper is contended by two subjects:

- The newly formed PSI of Riccardo Nencini: Michele Zoppo, late bankruptcy trustee of Avanti! and the former PSI, had already gave the original symbols and marks of the historical PSI ti the Italian Socialists formation, then become Italian Democratic Socialists in 1998 and Italian Socialist Party in 2007/2009. On 4 November 2011, the new bankruptcy trustee Francesco Spitoni definitively gave the property of the Avanti! original trademark to the PSI (with Riccardo Nencini as secretary) through the party treasurer Oreste Pastorelli. According to Spitoni, it is necessary "to guarantee the political and ideal meaning that newspaper Avanti! has in the Italian history, and in the history of the proletarian movement in particular", remembering that "this newspaper was founded by Andrea Costa, first socialist deputy in 1891, and it had been an official body of PSI since 1896". Spitoni then established to give "irrecovably and in an exclusive way, also moral, including the denomination, also partialially as well as the graphic layout, of the journalistic newspaper Avanti!". The assignation occurred free of charge because it had "the specific purpose to ensure that the historical newspaper of PSI, official body of the party since 1896, continues to represent the secular tradition of the Italian socialist movement". Therefore, Avanti! online has been online since the 5 Jangennaio 2012, with journalist Giampiero Marazzo (brother of journalist and politician Piero Marazzo) as editor-in-chief, replaced in September 2013 by former socialist deputy Mauro Del Bue. The newspaper is published by PSI through the Società Nuova Editrice "Mondoperaio" s.r.l.;
- Critica sociale, a company which publishes the homonymous periodical, registered Avanti! in 1994, one year after the cessation of the publications, according to the Italian law on press. The ownership was disputed, as for the other Avanti!, by the new PSI, given that the trademark was in the only availability of the bankruptcy trustee. The dispute was thwarted by the copyright attribution of the trademark and name of Avanti! to the ownership of Critica Sociale by the Trademarks and Patents office of the Department of Productive Activities of the Italian Ministry of Economic Development in 2012.

== See also ==
- List of newspapers in Italy

== Bibliography ==
- Intini, Ugo (2012). Avanti! Un giornale, un'epoca. Rome: Ponte Sisto.
