= Maurizio Maraviglia =

Italian politician and academic

Maurizio Maraviglia (15 January 1878, Paola, Calabria – 26 September 1955, Rome) was an Italian politician and academic.

== Life ==
A functionary in the Ministry of Public Information, Maraviglia was a member of the Italian Socialist Party until 1906. Moving to the right he became a supporter of nationalism and a founder member of the Italian Nationalist Association in 1910. An important figure in the development of their ideology, he was part of the editorial staff of L'Idea Nazionale. Following service in the First World War he also wrote for the influential Politica journal of Francesco Coppola and Alfredo Rocco. He came to identify with fascism and was part of the negotiation team that secured the merger between the Association and the National Fascist Party.

Under the fascists Maraviglia initially enjoyed a high profile. He served in the Italian Chamber of Deputies for Calabria-Lucania from 1924 to 1939 before graduating to the Italian Senate. He was appointed to the Grand Council of Fascism in 1938 and managed to secure a position at the University of Perugia as an academic alongside Sergio Panunzio. His profile fell in later years after he was implicated in fraud at the Banca del Sud. He was adjudged to have no war guilt charges to answer and took no part in post-war politics.
