= Bourgeois nation =

Nationalist concept

Bourgeois nation was a term used by Italian fascists to refer to nations that had embraced what the fascists saw as decadent and materialistic lifestyles associated with standard bourgeois culture. Early fascist movements expressed contempt for "those who wanted only to earn money, filthy money," and denounced bourgeois culture as being too weak and individualistic to make a nation strong. Fascists idealized sport, physical activity, life in the open air, and virile athletic pursuits, which they contrasted with the image of "corpulent politicians", "great, sedentary bourgeois", and tobacco-smoking left-wing intellectuals in "anxious waiting for the hour of the aperitif." Italian Fascists also accused wealthy nations of hypocrisy because they built colonial empires in the past and then used the League of Nations to prevent nations like Italy from conquering colonies of their own. Nevertheless, despite these early denunciations of bourgeois culture and the pursuit of monetary gain, fascist parties in power helped large companies to achieve greater profits by banning strikes and lowering wages, and they "showered money on armaments industries, to the immense satisfaction of employers."

In 1919, as leader of the newly created Italian Fascist movement, Benito Mussolini denounced the Treaty of Versailles as a "mutilated victory" for Italy, because despite being on the winning side, many Italian territorial demands were not met. It was in this context that he first used the term "bourgeois nation", negatively referring to Britain as "the fattest and most bourgeois nation in the world". Mussolini described bourgeois nations as seeking to assert hegemony over the ability to pursue imperialism, while hypocritically denying Italy the ability to pursue imperialism of its own. Much later, from 1937 to 1939, Mussolini encouraged Italians to foster an anti-bourgeois attitude by having them send in anti-bourgeois cartoons to be published in newspapers, and by denouncing "social games, five o'clock tea, vacations, compassion for Jews, preference for armchairs, desire for compromise, desire for money" as indulgent bourgeois practices. In 1938, with war on the horizon, Mussolini escalated a public relations campaign against Italy's bourgeoisie, accusing them of preferring private gain to national victory.

Germany's Nazis also rejected the bourgeois culture of states associated with materialistic consumption, profiteering, and plutocracy, which were contrasted with the ideals of military discipline and bravery that the Nazis identified with the German spirit. Adolf Hitler was personally disgusted with the ruling bourgeois elites of Germany during the period of the Weimar Republic, obscenely referring to them as "cowardly shits".

Fascism's conception of the bourgeois nation was influenced by the political and economic theories of Vilfredo Pareto, who criticized capitalism for causing moral disintegration of societies that deteriorates the political order of societies. Pareto's criticism of capitalism was focused on its moral aspects, and he did not criticize capitalism for economic inequality, which he supported. Pareto argued that as wealth increases, idealism decreases, causing both money and individuals to soften in strength. Pareto claimed that the only means to rectify this weakening of strength was violence, war, or revolution.

== See also ==
- Bourgeoisie
- Fascism
- Nationalism
- Proletarian nation
- Proletariat
