= L'Idea Nazionale =

Political newspaper in Italy (1911–1926)

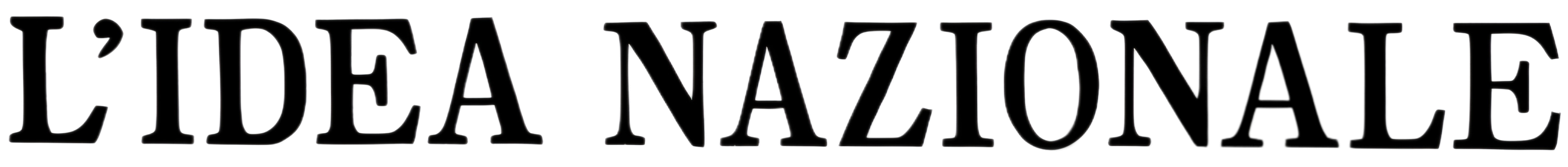
- Type: Weekly newspaper (1911-1914); Daily newspaper (1914-1926)
- Owner: Italian Nationalist Association
- Founded: 1 March 1911
- Ceased publication: 1926
- Political alignment: Italian nationalism Italian irredentism Social conservatism Right-wing socialism Monarchism; Anti-communism; Anti-liberalism; Militarism
- Headquarters: Rome

L'Idea Nazionale (Italian for "The National Idea") was an Italian political newspaper associated with the Italian Nationalist Association (ANI), which merged with the National Fascist Party in 1923. The paper was published between 1911 and 1926.

== History and profile ==
L'Idea Nazionale was first published on 1 March 1911, the fifteenth anniversary of the Battle of Adwa. The paper was a weekly publication and was based in Rome. It was founded by ANI activist Enrico Corradini. Alfredo Rocco was also instrumental in the establishment of it. In fact, the founders were part of the imperialist wing of the ANI.

L'Idea Nazionale was coedited by Enrico Corradini, Roberto Forges Davanzati and Luigi Federzoni. Other writers included Francesco Coppola, Maurizio Maraviglia and the Romanian Elena Bacaloglu. For the first three years L'Idea Nazionale had a weekly periodicity. In 1914 after the beginning of the First World War, it was decided to turn it into a newspaper. To this end, the newspaper sought funding from industrialists with a nationalist and protectionist orientation. On May 14, 1914, the new publishing company, "L'Italiana" (share capital of 700,000 lire divided into 140 shares) was set up. Leading the negotiations was an industrialist close to the Nationalist Association: Dante Ferraris, a metallurgical industrialist and vice president of Fiat. The grants came from the steel, mechanical and sugar sectors: such as the Savona Steel Company and Italian Society for the Indigenous Sugar Industry, Ansaldo company and Società Italiana Ernesto Breda. Dante Ferraris was president of the first board of directors.

Funding by the business community allowed L’Idea Nazionale to be published regularly. In return the Nationalists supported large-scale industry. In January 1916, for instance, Alfredo Rocco wrote that industrialists were kept away from the positions of power, when they should be more involved in political life.

The Nationalist Association and its paper advocated militaristic nationalism and the creation of an Italian Empire. First, the newspaper endorsed Italy's war of 1911 against the Ottoman Empire, urging for the annexation of North African colonies. It then supported irredentism, campaigning for Italy to enter World War I against the Central Powers.

L'Idea Nazionale ceased publication in 1926 when it was merged with La Tribuna.
