= Francesco Coppola (journalist) =

- Born: September 27, 1878; Naples, Italy
- Died: 1957; Anacapri, Italy
- Occupations: Politician, journalist & publisher
- Writing career
- Literary movement: Fascism

Francesco Coppola (September 27, 1878 – 1957) was a prominent Italian journalist and politician in the twentieth century who associated with Italian nationalism and later Italian Fascism.

From 1904 to 1908 Coppola wrote for Il Giornale d'Italia, a Rome newspaper in which he was known for expressing anti-democratic and anti-socialist sentiments. In 1908, Coppola moved to writing for the Rome newspaper La Tribuna where he began to strongly support Italian nationalism and imperialism. Two years later Coppola became one of the founders of the nationalist political party called the Italian Nationalist Association and with the support of two other prominent nationalists, Enrico Corradini and Luigi Federzoni, he launched the party's official newspaper, L'Idea Nazionale. Coppola strongly supported Italy's actions in the Italo-Libyan War which resulted in the capture of Libya from the Ottoman Empire.

During World War I, Coppola demanded that Italy join the war. In 1916, Coppola fought on the front in the Italian army. From 1917 to 1918 he undertook various nationalist propaganda missions. Coppola attended the Paris Peace Conference and was enraged with the territorial settlement that Italy received, accusing the Italian government and the Allies of giving Italy a "mutilated victory".

In the aftermath of World War I, Coppola joined Benito Mussolini's Fascist movement in 1919. Coppola by this time was known for advocating racist philosophy within the Fascist movement. In 1923, Coppola participated in influencing the Italian Nationalist Association to join the National Fascist Party. In 1923 and 1925, Coppola served the Fascist government as an Italian delegate to the League of Nations. In 1929 when he was made a professor at the University of Perugia, Mussolini made him a member of the Royal Academy of Italy in 1929.
