= La Lupa (magazine) =

Political magazine in Italy (1910–1911)

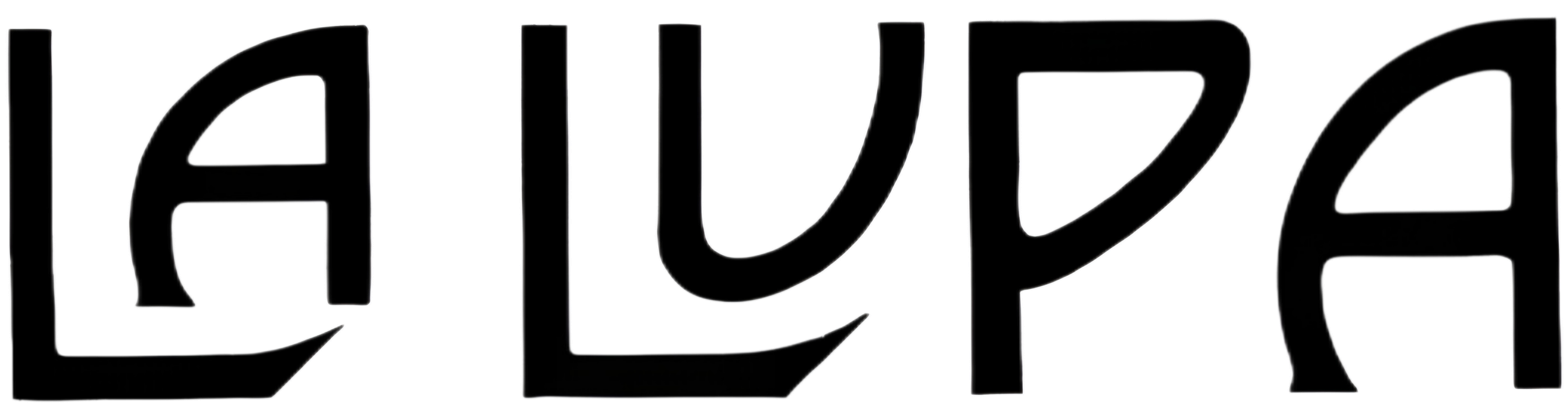
- Editor: Paolo Orano
- Categories: Political magazine
- Frequency: Weekly
- Founder: Paolo Orano
- Founded: 1910
- First issue: 16 October 1910
- Final issue: 8 October 1911
- Country: Italy
- Based in: Florence
- Language: Italian

La Lupa (Italian: The she wolf) was a weekly magazine which was published in Florence, Italy, in the period 1910–1911. Although it existed for a short period, it is known to be one of the publications which laid the foundations of the fascist governments in the following years.

== History and profile ==
La Lupa was first published on 16 October 1910. The magazine was founded by Paolo Orano and was published on a weekly basis in Florence until 8 October 1911. It was an illustrated magazine with the size of 60x43 cm.

Orano was editor of the magazine. La Lupa was an advocate of the nationalism based on energy and will. The weekly supported the war in Libya against the Ottoman Empire considering it as a revolution. The magazine became a platform for both syndicalists supporting Georges Sorel who was among the contributors and anti-parliamentarian nationalists, but provided them with an emerging ideology, namely proletarian nation. It was developed by Enrico Corradini and would be adopted by future Fascist ruler of Italy, Benito Mussolini. Major contributors of La Lupa were nationalist figures, including Enrico Corradini, Arturo Labriola, Massimo Fovel, Paolo Mantica, A. Renda, Emilio Roncati, Gustavo Magni, Rhea Silvia, Michele Giua and Donna Paola.
