= Carlo Romussi =

Italian lawyer, journalist, and politician

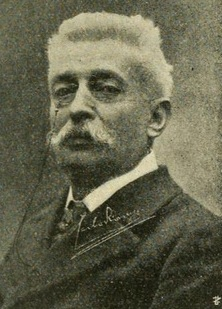
Photo as member of the Chamber of Deputies

Carlo Romussi (10 December 1847 – 2 March 1913) was an Italian lawyer, journalist, and politician.

He was born in Milan to a prominent family. He studied law at the University of Pavia, graduating in 1870. He moved to Milan, and gradually abandoned the practice of law, and began writing columns about Milanese history for the journal Il Secolo and became its director from 1896-1909. In his historical writing, he was mentored by the historian Cesare Cantù. In the newspaper, he worked alongside Edoardo Sonzogno. In politics, he became an ally of Cavalloti. In 1898, he was arrested, along with other newspaper editors, for his pronouncements regarding the food riots of May 6–9, 1898 in Milan, that led to the Bava Beccaris massacre. Released and pardoned after a year. He was elected to the Chamber of Deputies in 1904, aligning himself with the more radical or liberal elements of the chamber.

== Works ==
- Milano ne' suoi monumenti, Edoardo Sonzogno editor, 1875;
- Il libro delle società operaje, Sonzogno, 1880;
- I grandi italiani. Carlo Cattaneo, Sonzogno, 1884;
- Il Duomo di Milano, Hoepli, 1902;
- Storia d'Italia narrata al popolo, Sonzogno, 1910;
- Manualetto del cittadino italiano, Sonzogno, 1910;
- Milano che sfugge, Aliprandi 1913.

== References and Bibliography ==
- In part derived from Italian Wikipedia.
- Susanna Massari, Inventario dell'archivio Carlo Romussi 1847-1913, Impremix Ed. Visual Grafika, 2008, ISBN 9788895816029 (versione digitalizzata)
- Romussi, Carlo, article by Marco Soresina (2017)
