= Italian Nationalist Association =

Political party, 1910–1923

Italian Nationalist Association Associazione Nazionalista Italiana
- Secretary: Enrico Corradini (1910–1914); Antonello Caprino (1914–1919); Armando Zanetti (1919–1920); Umberto Guglielmotti (1920–1923)
- Other leaders: Gabriele D'Annunzio; Luigi Federzoni; Alfredo Rocco; Costanzo Ciano
- Founded: 3 December 1910
- Dissolved: 4 March 1923
- Merged into: National Fascist Party
- Newspaper: L'Idea Nazionale
- Paramilitary wing: Camicie Azzurre
- Ideology: Italian nationalism; Proto-fascism
- Political position: Far-right
- National affiliation: National Bloc (1921–1923)
- Colours: Blue

The Italian Nationalist Association (Italian: Associazione Nazionalista Italiana, ANI) was a political party in the Kingdom of Italy that was established in 1910. Representing Italy's nationalist political movement, its leader was Enrico Corradini, who also acted as the party's secretary. It was founded following the first congress of Italian nationalists who had identified themselves with the founder Corradini.

Although Corradini hoped that the ANI would become a working-class nationalist mass party, it was mainly supported by right-wing nationalists and had significant influence on the nascent Italian fascist movement and ultimately merged with the National Fascist Party (PNF) in 1923. It was joined by artists and intellectuals such as Gabriele D'Annunzio, Giovanni Verga, and Giacomo Puccini, jurists such as Alfredo Rocco, and military men such as Costanzo Ciano.

== History ==
The ANI was founded in Florence on 3 December 1910 as the political-organisational expression of nationalism in Italy under the influence of Italian nationalists such as Corradini and Giovanni Papini. Upon its formation, the ANI supported the repatriation of Austrian held Italian-populated lands to the Kingdom of Italy and was willing to endorse war with Austria-Hungary to do so. The ANI had a paramilitary wing called the Blueshirts.

The ANI supported Italian irredentist, corporatist, monarchist, and militarist positions. The authoritarian nationalist faction of the ANI would be a major influence for the PNF of Benito Mussolini formed in 1921. As a result, it is described as proto-fascism, and is placed on the far right of the political spectrum. In 1922, the ANI participated in the March on Rome with an important role but was not completely aligned with Mussolini's fascist party. Nevertheless, the ANI merged into the PNF in March 1923.

== Ideology ==
The ANI's ideology remained largely undefined for some time other than it being nationalist. The ANI was divided between supporters of different kinds of nationalism – authoritarian, democratic, moderate, and revolutionary. Corradini, the ANI's most popular spokesman, linked leftism with nationalism by claiming that Italy was a "proletarian nation", which was being exploited by international capitalism, which had led to Italy being disadvantaged economically in international trade and its people divided on class lines; however, instead of advocating socialist revolution, he claimed that victory against these oppressing forces would require Italian nationalist sentiment to succeed.

We are the proletarian people in respect to the rest of the world. Nationalism is our socialism. This established, nationalism must be founded on the truth that Italy is morally and materially a proletarian nation.

— Manifesto of the Italian Nationalist Association, December 1910

We must start by recognizing the fact that there are proletarian nations as well as proletarian classes; that is to say, there are nations whose living conditions are subject ... to the way of life of other nations, just as classes are. Once this is realized, nationalism must insist firmly on this truth: Italy is, materially and morally, a proletarian nation.

— Enrico Corradini, Report to the First Nationalist Congress, Florence, 3 December 1910

Corradini occasionally used the term "national socialism" (Italian: socialismo nazionale) to define the ideology which he endorsed. Although this is the same term ("National Socialism", Italian: nazionalsocialismo) used by the Nazis, no evidence exists to indicate that Corradini's use of the term had any influence. In 1914, the ANI began to tilt towards authoritarian nationalism with its endorsement of the creation of an authoritarian corporate state, a radical idea created by Rocco, who was a law professor. Such a corporate state would be led by a corporate assembly rather than a parliament, which would be composed of unions, business organisations, and other economic organisations that would work within a powerful state government to regulate business-labour relations, organise the economy, end class conflict, and make Italy an industrial state that could compete with imperial powers and establish its own empire.

== Membership ==
Many of the ANI supporters were wealthy Italians of right-wing authoritarian and conservative-authoritarian nationalist background, in spite of efforts by Corradini and left-leaning nationalists to make the ANI a nationalist mass movement supported by the working class. As a result, it is described as a national-conservative and right-wing party.

== Prominent members ==
- Francesco Coppola
- Enrico Corradini
- Luigi Federzoni
- Roberto Forges Davanzati
- Ezio Maria Gray
- Maurizio Maraviglia
- Giovanni Papini
- Alfredo Rocco

== Electoral results ==
=== Italian Parliament ===
Chamber of Deputies
Election year	Votes	%	Seats	+/−	Leader
1921	Into National Bloc	–	11 / 535	–	Enrico Corradini

== Bibliography ==
- Anderson, Malcolm (2013). Frontier Regions in Western Europe. Routledge.
- "Associazione nazionalista italiana". PBMstoria (in Italian). 2006. Archived from the original on 24 December 2016.
- De Grand, Alexander (2001). The Hunchback's Tailor: Giovanni Giolitti and Liberal Italy from the Challenge of Mass Politics to the Rise of Fascism, 1882–1922. Bloomsbury Academic. ISBN 978-0-275-96874-8.
- Duignan, Brian (10 February 2023). "Protofascism". Encyclopædia Britannica.
- Fonzo, Erminio (2017). Storia dell'Associazione nazionalista italiana (1910-1923) (in Italian). Naples: Edizioni Scientifiche Italiane. ISBN 978-88-495-3350-7.
- Grand, Alexander (1978). The Italian Nationalist Association and the Rise of Fascism in Italy. University of Nebraska Press.
- Marsella, Mauro (23 January 2007). "Enrico Corradini's Italian Nationalism: The 'Right Wing' of the Fascist Synthesis". Journal of Political Ideologies. 9 (2): 203–224. doi:10.1080/13569310410001691217.
- Merriman, John M.; Winter, J. M. (2006). Europe 1789 to 1914: Encyclopedia of the Age of Industry and Empire. Vol. 1. Charles Scribner's Sons. ISBN 978-0-684-31360-3.
- Payne, Stanley G. (1996). A History of Fascism, 1914–1945. Madison, Wisconsin: University of Wisconsin Press. ISBN 978-0-299-14873-7 – via Google Books.
- Sarfatti, Margherita (2012). Sullivan, Brian (ed.). My Fault: Mussolini As I Knew Him. Enigma Books. ISBN 978-1-936-27440-6.
- Talmon, Jacob Leib (1991). The Myth of the Nation and the Vision of Revolution: The Origins of Ideological Polarization (first paperback ed.). Berkeley: University of California Press.
- Whittam, John (1995). Fascist Italy. Manchester University Press.
