= Arturo Labriola =

Italian politician (1873–1959)

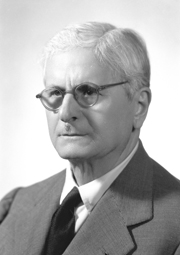

Minister of Labor and Social Security
- In office 14 July 1920 – 15 June 1921
- Prime Minister: Giovanni Giolitti
- Preceded by: Mario Abbiate
- Succeeded by: Alberto Beneduce

Interim Grand Master of the Grand Orient (In exile)
- In office 23 June 1930 – 29 November 1931
- Preceded by: Eugenio Chiesa
- Succeeded by: Alessandro Tedeschi

Personal details
- Born: 21 January 1873 Naples, Italy
- Died: 23 June 1959 (aged 86) Naples, Italy
- Party: PSI (1895–1913); PSRI (1913–1926); PDL (1946–1948)
- Profession: Politician, Economist

Arturo Labriola (Italian: [labriˈɔːla]; 21 January 1873 – 23 June 1959) was an Italian revolutionary syndicalist and socialist politician and journalist.

== Life ==
=== Early political activity (until 1897) ===
Labriola was born in Naples on 21 January 1873 to Luigi Labriola, an artisan. While studying jurisprudence in University of Naples, Arturo Labriola started his political activity. In 1891 he joined the Republican-Socialist University Circle. Between 1892 and 1895, he collaborated on various periodicals: Socialismo Popolare, edited by Carlo Monicelli, Rivista Popolare di Politica, Litteratura e Scienze Sociali, edited by Napoleone Colajanni and Critica Sociale, edited by Filippo Turati. Labriola was involved with the Fasci Siciliani (1892–1893) and therefore was suspended for one year from university studies. In 1897, Labriola joined Italian Socialist Party (PSI) and fought in the Greco-Turkish War in Crete.

=== Life in exile (1898–1900) ===
In May 1898, workers in Milan organized strikes and protests to demonstrate against the government. The riots were brutally repressed: troops fired on demonstrators, and Filippo Turati was arrested, and accused of inspiring the riots. Labriola fled to Geneva in order to elude arrest. There, he taught at University of Geneva and worked with Vilfredo Pareto. Labriola was expelled from Switzerland in the same year and moved to Paris. In Paris he met the socialists Georges Sorel, Hubert Lagardelle and Paul Lafargue.

=== Revolutionary syndicalist period ===
He returned to Italy in 1900, and in 1902 published a weekly called Avanguardia Socialista which became the centre of activity for Italian revolutionary syndicalism. From 1910 to 1911 he was one of the leading contributors of La Lupa, a weekly magazine supporting the revolution. He later withdrew his support for revolution, and adopted Marxist Reformism, becoming a member of the Italian Parliament as an independent. Favourable to Italy's participation in World War I, Labriola also served as Minister of Labor in the last of Giovanni Giolitti's cabinets (1920).

An opponent of Fascism, he had to take exile in France after Benito Mussolini came to power, but returned in 1935. In 1946 he was elected member of the Constituent Assembly of Italy as a National Democratic Union candidate. In 1948 he became a senator of the new Republic.

As it was confirmed by the former President of the Grand Orient of Italy, he was one of the eight father constituents belonging to the main Italian Masonic organization.

== Works ==
- La teoria del valore di C. Marx, Studio sul III libro del Capitale (1899)
- Riforme e rivoluzione sociale (1904, 1906)
- Karl Marx, L'Économiste, Le Socialiste (1910)
- Storia di dieci anni (1910)
- La guerra di Tripoli e l'opinione socialista (1912)
- Spiegazioni a me stesso (1945)
