= Giovanni Merloni =

Italian politician and journalist (1873-1936)

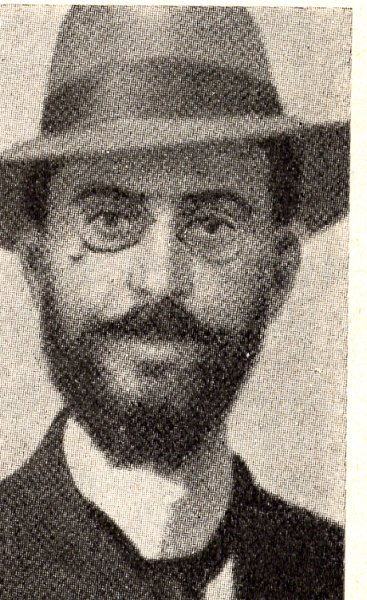

Member of the Chamber of Deputies
- In office 1913–1924
- Constituency: Grosseto

Personal details
- Born: 2 June 1873 Cesena, Kingdom of Italy
- Died: 30 October 1936 (aged 63) Rome, Kingdom of Italy
- Party: Italian Socialist Party
- Occupation: Journalist

Giovanni Merloni (2 June 1873 – 30 October 1936) was an Italian journalist and politician.

== Life and career ==
Born in Cesena on 2 June 1873, Merloni studied in Venice, graduating in languages in 1897. He joined the Italian Socialist Party (PSI) at an early stage and became active as a journalist and organizer, contributing to leading socialist publications such as Critica Sociale and Avanti!. His knowledge of foreign languages and interest in international socialism helped establish him as a prominent figure within the reformist wing of the party.

After early political activity in Romagna, he moved to Rome in 1900 to work on the editorial staff of Avanti!, where he served as editor for several years. Within the PSI, he emerged as a key reformist leader aligned with Filippo Turati, advocating gradual social and political reforms. He played a central role in campaigns for universal suffrage and proportional representation, emphasizing political education as essential to democratic participation. Elected to the Chamber of Deputies in 1913, he represented the constituency of Grosseto and remained active in socialist politics during World War I, supporting neutralism and civil solidarity.

Merloni was also involved in Freemasonry, joining in 1906 and later publicly defending the compatibility of Masonic and socialist commitments. This position became increasingly controversial within the PSI, which formally declared the incompatibility of the two affiliations in 1914. Despite this, he maintained both roles for some time.

Re-elected to parliament in 1919 and 1921, he denounced the rise of Fascist violence. Under the Fascist regime, he remained under police surveillance, particularly for his Masonic connections. Arrested in 1936 after correspondence with exiled Freemasons was discovered, he was sentenced to internal exile. Shortly thereafter, following a cerebral hemorrhage, he was allowed to return to Rome, where he died on 30 October 1936.
