= Enrico Corradini =

Italian writer, journalist, and politician (1865–1931)

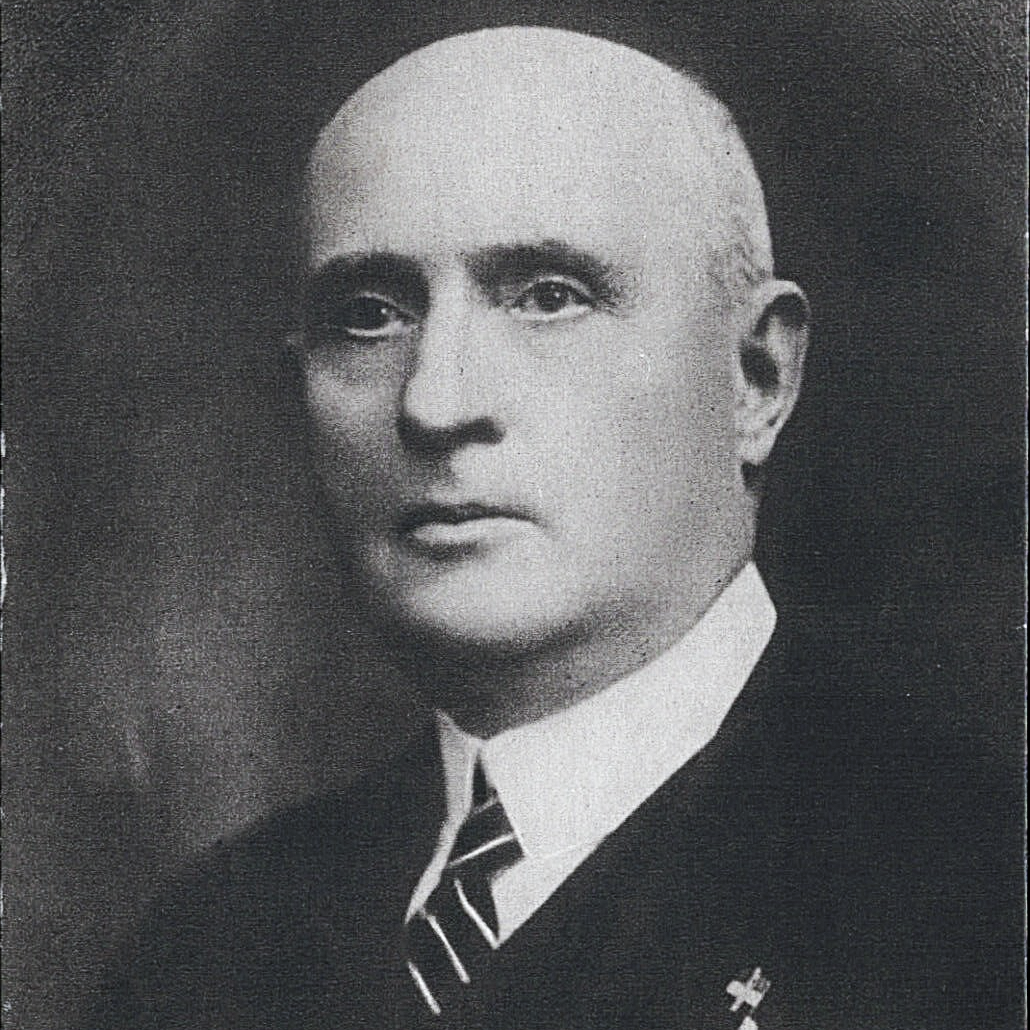

Senator of the Kingdom of Italy
- In office 7 June 1923 – 10 December 1931
- Monarch: Victor Emmanuel III

Personal details
- Born: 20 July 1865 near Montelupo Fiorentino
- Died: 10 December 1931 (aged 66) Rome
- Party: Italian Nationalist Association (1910–1923); National Fascist Party (1923–1931)
- Education: University of Florence
- Occupation: Novelist, essayist, journalist, and nationalist political figure
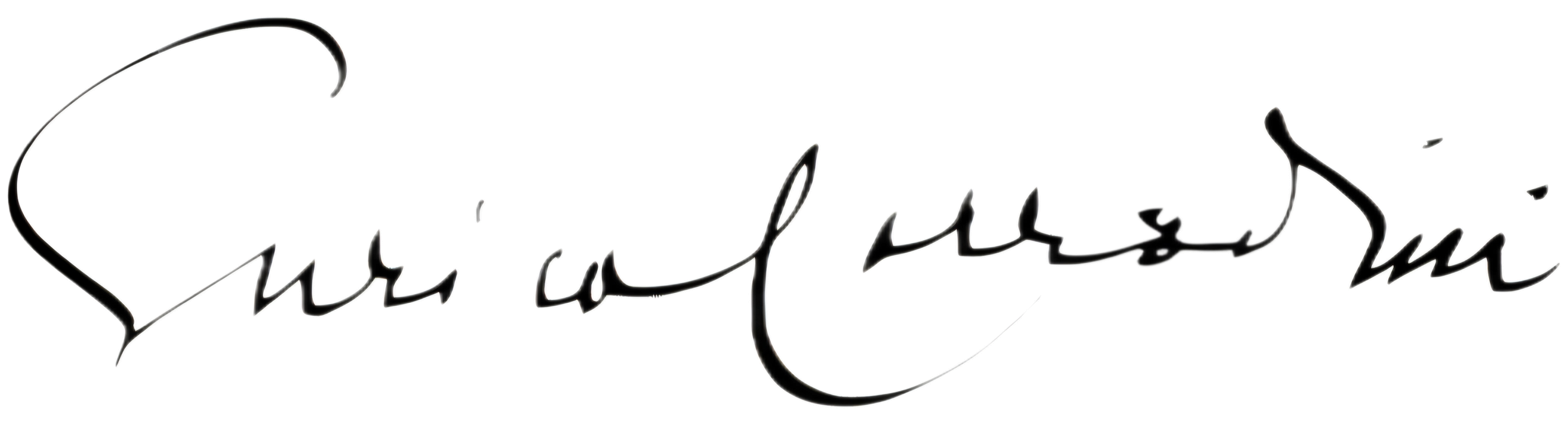
- Signature

Enrico Corradini (20 July 1865 – 10 December 1931) was an Italian novelist, essayist, journalist and nationalist political figure.

== Biography ==
Corradini was born near Montelupo Fiorentino, Tuscany. He graduated in Literature from the University of Florence in 1888.

A follower of Gabriele D'Annunzio, he founded the newspaper Il Regno (1903-1905), together with intellectuals Giovanni Papini, Vilfredo Pareto, and Giuseppe Prezzolini. It quickly became a staple for irredentist and radical thought that was to blend into Fascism. In 1910, the Italian Nationalist Association (Associazione Nazionalista Italiana, ANI) was founded with the participation of Corradini, who was among the leaders. It made a name for itself after giving full support to Italian imperialism and the Italo-Turkish War of 1911 - Corradini wrote two political essays on the matter (Il volere d'Italia - "Italy's Desire", and L'ora di Tripoli - "Tripoli's Moment"). He expanded such bellicose theories in the weekly L'Idea Nazionale, founded by him together with Alfredo Rocco and Luigi Federzoni. Corradini also published articles in La Lupa based in Florence between 1910 and 1911.

L'Idea Nazionale was turned into a daily with financing from natural advocates of militarism - military men and weapon manufacturers. Corradini and his paper created a generic nationalist theory after adopting Populism and Corporatism, while advocating Italy's entry into World War I - initially on the side of the Triple Alliance (the Central Powers, to which Italy had committed itself), then on that of the Triple Entente (the Allies - which promised to grant Italy all its territorial demands). The group also focused on a violent press campaign against Prime Minister Giovanni Giolitti and other supporters of neutrality.

Corradini developed the concept of proletarian nationalism in 1919:

We must start by recognizing the fact that there are proletarian nations as well as proletarian classes; that is to say, there are nations whose living conditions are subject... to the way of life of other nations, just as classes are. Once this is realized, nationalism must insist firmly on this truth: Italy is, materially and morally, a proletarian nation." (Report to the First Nationalist Congress, Florence, 3 December 1919)

After the war, ANI was led by Corradini into a merger with the Partito Nazionale Fascista (PNF). Nonetheless, Corradini made sure to detach himself from the more controversial actions of the Blackshirts, while being nominated by Benito Mussolini to the Italian Senate, and joining his government in 1928.

As a writer, Corradini enjoyed success both as a novelist and a playwright. His early plays and novels had been D'Annunzian in manner and focused on existential concerns. In the new social climate of the Giolittian era, his creative writing took a strongly nationalist turn. His last two, and best-known, literary works, the novels La patria lontana ("The Distant Fatherland"; 1910) and La guerra lontana ("The Distant War"; 1911), are vehicles for a vitalist, anti-democratic and imperialist ideology.

Corradini died in Rome on 10 December 1931.

== Works ==
- Italian Nationalism (1914) -- Translated into English from Italian (Il nazionalismo italiano). Sunny Lou Publishing Company, ISBN 978-1-95539-242-6, 2023.
- Julius Caesar: A Play in Five Acts (1929).
- Le Vie dell'Oceano (1913).
