= Pasquale Jannaccone =

Italian economist and literary critic

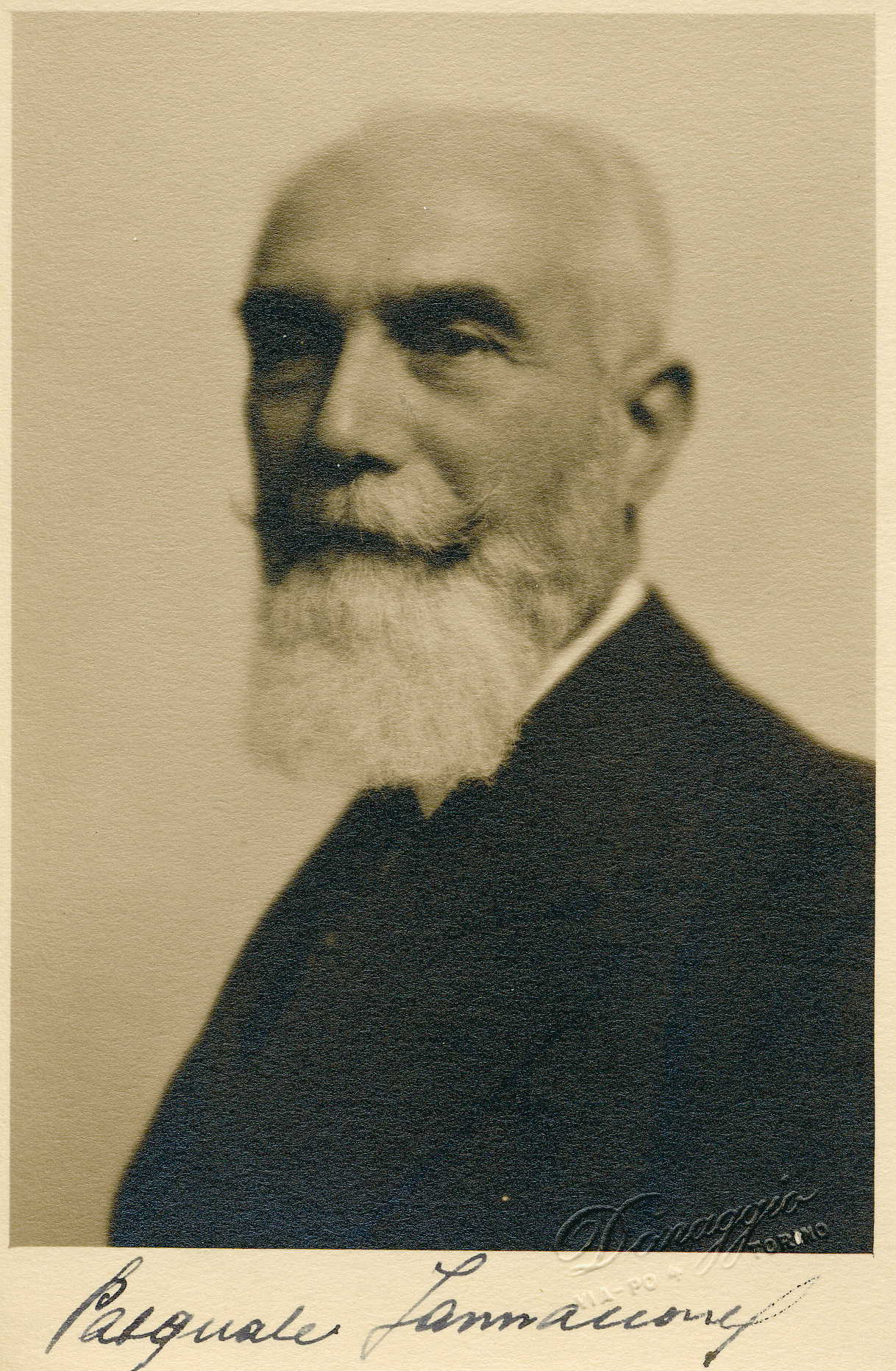
- Born: 18 May 1872; Naples, Italy
- Died: 22 December 1959 (aged 87); Turin, Italy
- Education: University of Turin
- Occupations: Economist, Literary Critic
- Known for: Senator for life (1950), co-founder of the Italian Society of Economists

Pasquale Jannaccone (18 May 1872 in Naples – 22 December 1959 in Turin) was an Italian economist and literary critic, nominated senator for life by Luigi Einaudi in 1950.

Pasquale Jannaccone earned his Law degree from the University of Turin in 1893. Subsequently, he taught Political Economy at the Universities of Cagliari (starting in 1900), Siena (beginning in 1905), and Padua (from 1909). In 1916, Jannaccone returned to Turin, where he instructed students in Statistics and, later, Economic Policy until his retirement in 1942. Between 1901 and 1918, he acted as the director of the 5th series of the Biblioteca dell'Economista. Additionally, from 1908 onwards, Jannaccone was involved in the management of La Riforma Sociale, with both institutions based in Turin.

A collection of his economic writings were published in the 1936 volume Prezzi e Mercati.

Between 1949 and 1955, Jannaccone held the position of president at the Academy of Sciences of Turin. In 1950, he co-founded the Italian Society of Economists with Gustavo Del Vecchio, Giovanni Demaria, Luigi Einaudi, Giuseppe Ugo Papi, Volrico Travaglini, and Francesco Vito. Jannaccone served as the society's president from 1951 until 1954, while Einaudi held the title of honorary president due to his concurrent role as President of the Italian Republic.
