= Panunzio =

Panunzio is a surname. Notable people with the surname include:

- Sergio Panunzio (1886–1944), Italian theoretician
- Thom Panunzio (born 1951), American music producer and engineer
