= Italian fascism =

Fascist ideology as developed in Italy

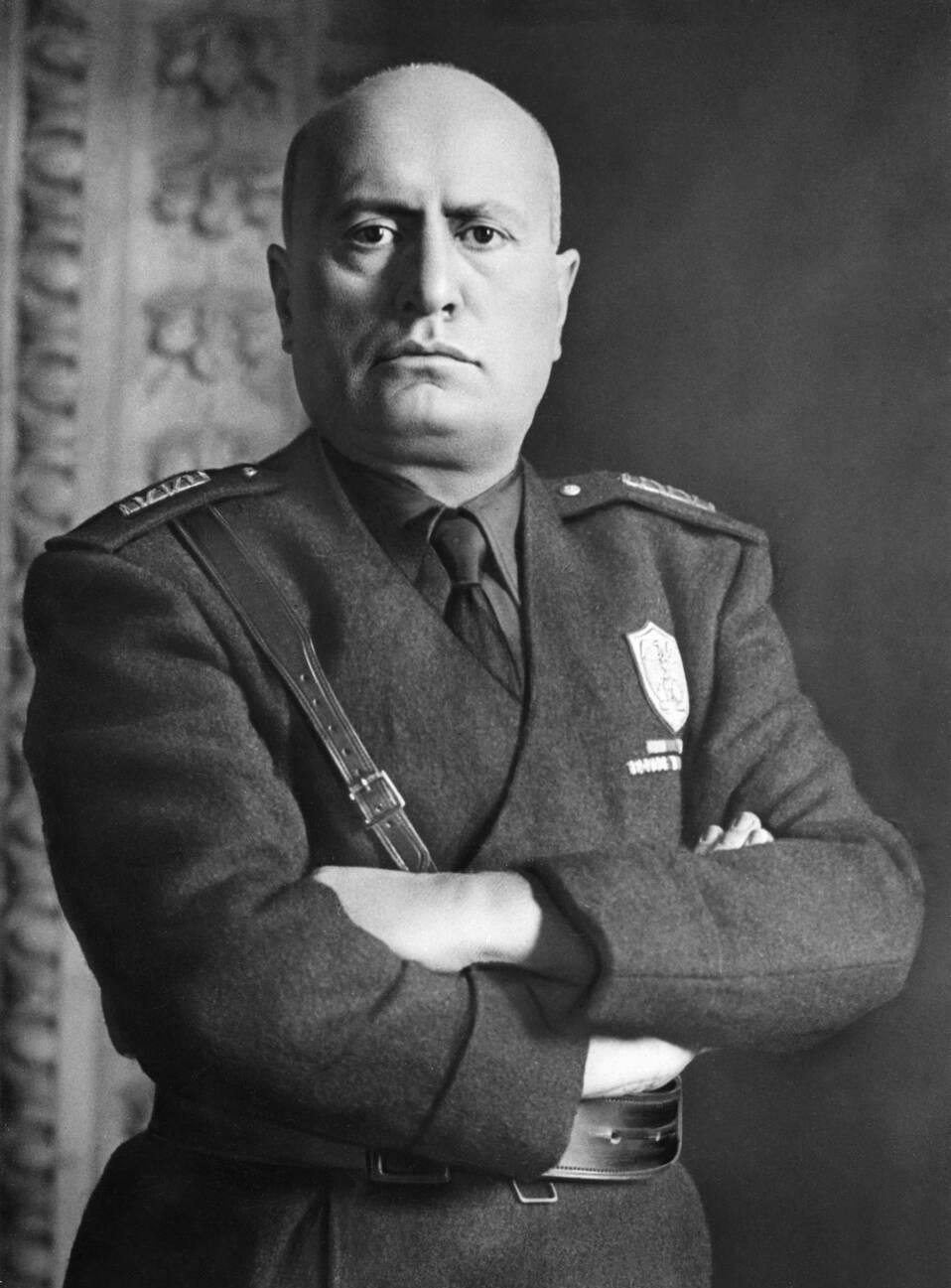
The fascist dictator Benito Mussolini titled himself Duce and ruled the Kingdom of Italy from 1922 to 1943.

Italian fascism (Italian: fascismo italiano), also called classical fascism or simply fascism, is the original fascist ideology, which Giovanni Gentile and Benito Mussolini developed in Italy. The ideology of Italian fascism is associated with a series of political parties led by Mussolini: the National Fascist Party (PNF), which governed the Kingdom of Italy from 1922 until 1943, and the Republican Fascist Party (PFR), which governed the Italian Social Republic (RSI) from 1943 to 1945. Italian fascism is also associated with the post-World War II Italian Social Movement (MSI) and later Italian neo-fascist political organizations.

Italian fascism was initially a left-wing nationalist and anti-clerical movement inspired by revolutionary syndicalism, and originated from ideological combinations of ultra-nationalism and Italian nationalism, national syndicalism, revolutionary nationalism, Futurism and from the militarism of Italian irredentism to regain "lost overseas territories of Italy" deemed necessary to restore Italian nationalist pride. Italian fascists also claimed that modern Italy was an heiress to the imperial legacy of Ancient Rome, and that there existed historical proof which supported the creation of an Imperial Fascist Italy to provide spazio vitale ("vital space") for the Second Italo-Senussi War of Italian settler colonization en route to establishing hegemonic control of the terrestrial basin of the Mediterranean Sea.

Italian fascism promoted a corporatist economic system, whereby employer and employee syndicates were linked together in associations to collectively represent the nation's economic producers and work alongside the state to set national economic policy. This economic system intended to resolve class conflict through collaboration between the classes. Italian fascism opposed liberalism, especially classical liberalism, which fascist leaders denounced as "the debacle of individualism". Fascism was opposed to socialism because of the latter's frequent opposition to nationalism, but it was also opposed to the reactionary conservatism developed by Joseph de Maistre. It believed the success of Italian nationalism required respect for tradition and a clear sense of a shared past among the Italian people, alongside a commitment to a modernized Italy.

Originally, many Italian fascists were opposed to Nazism, as the fascist movement in Italy did not espouse Nordicism nor, initially, the antisemitism inherent in Nazi ideology; however, many fascists, in particular Mussolini himself, held openly racialist and racist ideas (specifically against black Africans, Italian Jews, Roma, Sinti, and Slavic peoples) that were enshrined into law as official policy over the course of fascist rule. As Fascist Italy and Nazi Germany grew politically closer in the latter half of the 1930s, Italian laws and policies became explicitly antisemitic due to pressure from Nazi Germany (although antisemitic laws were rarely enforced in Italy), including the promulgation of the Manifesto of Race and Italian racial laws in the Kingdom of Italy and all colonies of the Italian Empire. In addition, the Greek population of the Dodecanese and Northern Epirus, which were then under Italian occupation, were persecuted by the Italian fascists as well. When the Italian fascists were in power, they also persecuted some linguistic minorities and Protestant denominations in Italy.

== Etymology ==
The fasces, a symbol of Ancient Rome, was employed in the modern era by various political movements to denote strength through unity.

The Italian term fascismo is derived from fascio, meaning "bundle of sticks", ultimately from the Latin word fasces. This was the name given to political organizations in Italy known as fasci, groups similar to guilds or syndicates. According to Italian fascist dictator Benito Mussolini's own account, the Fasces of Revolutionary Action were founded in Italy in 1915. In 1919, Mussolini founded the Italian Fasces of Combat in Milan, which became the National Fascist Party two years later. The fascists came to associate the term with the ancient Roman fasces or fascio littorio, a bundle of rods tied around an axe, an ancient Roman symbol of the authority of the civic magistrate, carried by his lictors. The symbolism of the fasces suggested strength through unity: a single rod is easily broken, while the bundle is difficult to break.

Prior to 1914, the fasces symbol was widely employed by various political movements, often of a left-wing or liberal persuasion. For instance, according to the American political scientist and historian Robert Paxton: "Marianne, symbol of the French Republic, was often portrayed in the nineteenth century carrying the fasces to represent the force of Republican solidarity against her aristocratic and clerical enemies." The symbol often appeared as an architectural motif, for instance on the Sheldonian Theater at the University of Oxford and on the Lincoln Memorial in Washington, D.C.

== Principal beliefs ==
=== Nationalism ===
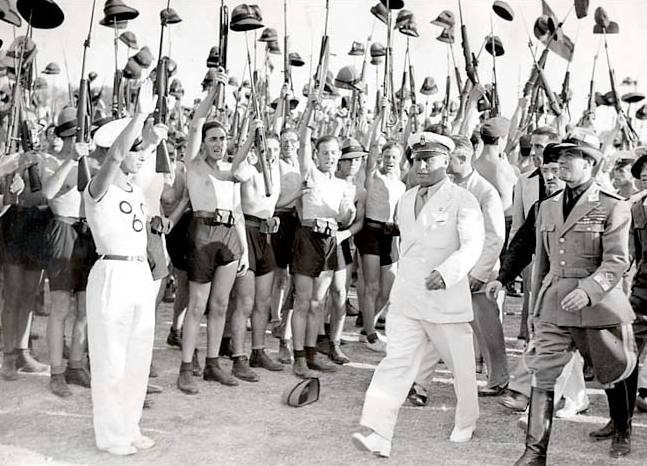
Benito Mussolini and fascist Blackshirt youth in 1935

Italian fascism is based upon Italian nationalism and in particular, it seeks to complete what it considers the incomplete Italian nationalist project of Risorgimento ("Resurgence", 1815–1871) by incorporating the "unredeemed" Italian-inhabited territories scattered across the Balkans and Southern Europe that both Italian nationalists and fascists regarded as Italia irredenta ("unredeemed Italy") into the Kingdom of Italy after its unification under the House of Savoy (1861). The National Fascist Party (PNF: Partito Nazionale Fascista), founded in Milan by Benito Mussolini in 1921, declared that the party was to serve as "a revolutionary militia placed at the service of the nation. It follows a policy based on three principles: order, discipline, hierarchy".

It identifies modern Italy as the heir to the Roman Empire and Italy during the Renaissance and it promotes the cultural identity of Romanitas ("Romanness"). Italian fascism historically sought to forge a strong Italian Empire as a Third Rome, identifying ancient Rome as the First Rome and Renaissance-era Italy as the "Second Rome". Italian fascism has attempted to emulate ancient Rome in many ways, and in particular Mussolini had emulated a few Roman leaders, such as Julius Caesar as a model for Mussolini's rise to power and Augustus as a model for building the Italian Empire. Italian fascism has directly promoted colonialism and imperialism, expounded through the politico-philosophical essay and ideological manifesto The Doctrine of Fascism (La dottrina del fascismo, 1932), authored by the actualist Italian philosopher Giovanni Gentile, ghostwritten by Gentile himself on behalf of Benito Mussolini and published in 1932:

The Fascist State is an embodied will to power and government: the Roman tradition is here an ideal of force in action. According to Fascism, government is not so much a thing to be expressed in territorial or military terms as in terms of morality and the spirit. It must be thought of as an Empire — that is to say, a nation which directly or indirectly rules other nations, without the need for conquering a single square yard of territory.

— Benito Mussolini and Giovanni Gentile, The Doctrine of Fascism (1932)

==== Irredentism and expansionism ====
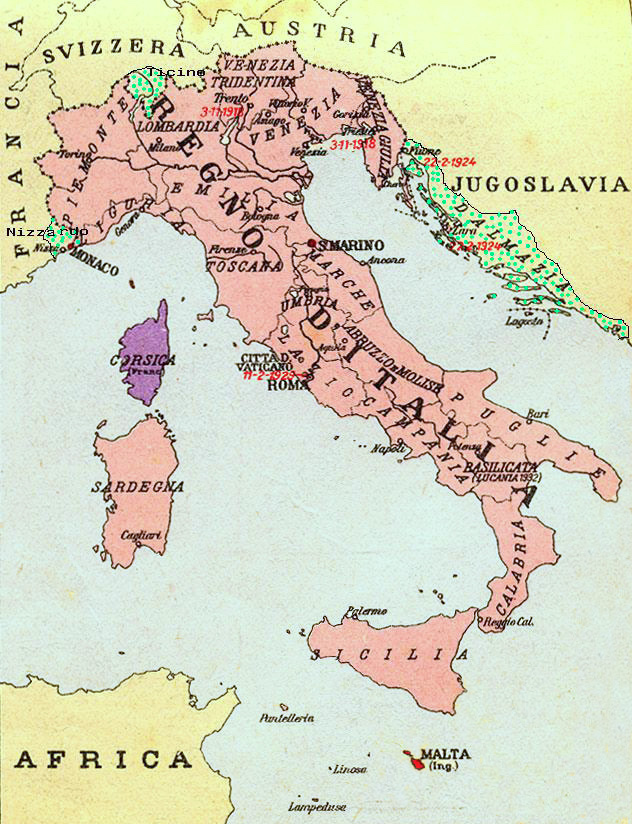
Italian ethnic regions claimed in the 1930s. Savoy and Corfu were later claimed. Nice, Ticino, and Dalmatia Malta Corsica

Italian fascism emphasized the need for the restoration and continuity of the Italian nationalist Risorgimento ("Resurgence", 1815–1871) tradition developed by Giuseppe Mazzini and Giuseppe Garibaldi that followed the unification of Italy under the House of Savoy (1861), that the fascists claimed had been left incomplete and abandoned in modern Italy due to the liberal-led governments of the Giolittian Era. In 1914, Italian nationalists began to campaign actively against the Austro-Hungarian Empire, which still controlled some Italian-speaking "irredent lands" in the aftermath of the Third Italian War of Independence (1866), and Italian neutrality between the major European Powers after the outbreak of the Great War. After the end of World War I and during the Interwar period (1918–1939), the Fascist regime sought the incorporation of claimed "unredeemed" territories into the Kingdom of Italy and the Italian Empire.

To the east of Italy, the Italian fascists claimed that Dalmatia was a land of Italian culture, whose Italian population (Dalmatian Italians), including those of Italianized South Slavic descent, had been driven out of Dalmatia and into exile in Italy, and supported the return of Italians of Dalmatian heritage. Mussolini identified Dalmatia as having strong Italian cultural roots for centuries due to their heritage being linked to the Roman Empire and the Republic of Venice. The fascists especially focused their claims based on the Venetian cultural heritage of Dalmatia, claiming that Venetian rule had been beneficial for all Dalmatians and had been accepted by the Dalmatian population. In the aftermath of World War I, Italian fascists were outraged when the agreement between Italy and the Entente Allies to have Dalmatia join Italy made in the 1915 Treaty of London was revoked in 1919. The Fascist regime supported the annexation of Yugoslavia's region of Slovenia into Italy that already held a portion of the Slovene population, whereby Slovenia would become an Italian province, resulting in a quarter of Slovene ethnic territory and approximately 327,000 out of a total population of 1.3 million Slovenes being subjected to forced Italianization. The fascist regime imposed mandatory Italianization upon the German and South Slavic populations living within Italy's borders. The fascist regime abolished the teaching of minority German and Slavic languages in schools, German and Slavic language newspapers were shut down, and geographical and family names in areas of German or Slavic languages were to be Italianized forcibly. This resulted in significant violence against South Slavs deemed to be resisting the fascist policy of Italianization.

In addition, the fascist regime supported the Italian annexation of Albania, claiming that Albanians were ethnically related to Italians through links with the prehistoric Italiote, Illyrian, and Roman populations, and that the major influence exerted by the Roman Empire and the Republic of Venice over Albania in the previous centuries justified Italy's right to possess it. The fascist regime also justified the annexation of Albania on the basis that—because several hundred thousand people of Albanian descent had been absorbed into society in southern Italy already—the incorporation of Albania was a reasonable measure that would unite people of Albanian descent into one state. The fascist regime endorsed Albanian irredentism, directed against the predominantly Albanian-populated Kosovo and Epirus, particularly in Chameria, inhabited by a substantial number of Albanians. After Italy annexed Albania in 1939, the fascist regime endorsed assimilating Albanians into Italians and colonizing Albania with Italian settlers from the Italian Peninsula to gradually transform it into an Italian land. The Fascist regime claimed the Ionian Islands as Italian territory on the basis that the islands had belonged to the Venetian Republic from the mid-14th until the late 18th century.

To the west of Italy, the fascists claimed the territories of Corsica, Nice, and Savoy and to the south claimed the territories of Malta and Corfu due to the presence of Corsican Italians, Niçard Italians, Maltese Italians, Corfiot Italians, and Savoyard Italians. During the period of Italian unification in 1860 to 1861, Prime Minister of Piedmont-Sardinia, Camillo Benso, Count of Cavour, who was leading the unification effort, faced opposition from French Emperor Napoleon III who indicated that France would oppose Italian unification unless France was given the County of Nice and Savoy that were held by Piedmont-Sardinia, as France did not want a powerful state having control of all the passages of the Alps. As a result, Piedmont-Sardinia was pressured to concede Nice and Savoy to France in exchange for France accepting the unification of Italy. The fascist regime produced literature on Corsica that presented evidence of the italianità (Italianness) of the island. The fascist regime produced literature on Nice that justified that Nice was an Italian land based on historic, ethnic and linguistic grounds. The fascists quoted medieval Italian scholar Petrarch, who said: "The border of Italy is the Var; consequently Nice is a part of Italy". The fascists quoted Italian national hero Giuseppe Garibaldi, who said: "Corsica and Nice must not belong to France; there will come the day when an Italy mindful of its true worth will reclaim its provinces now so shamefully languishing under foreign domination". Mussolini initially pursued promoting annexation of Corsica through political and diplomatic means, believing that Corsica could be annexed to Italy through first encouraging the existing autonomist tendencies in Corsica and then the independence of Corsica from France, that would be followed by the annexation of Corsica into Italy.

To the north of Italy, the fascist regime in the 1930s had designs on the largely Italian-populated region (Swiss Italians) of Ticino and the Romansch-populated region of Graubünden in Switzerland (the Romansch are a Latin-speaking people of the Western Alps). In November 1938, Mussolini declared to the Grand Fascist Council: "We shall bring our border to the Gotthard Pass". The fascist regime accused the Swiss government of oppressing the Romansch people in Graubünden. Mussolini argued that Romansch was an Italian dialect and thus Graubünden should be incorporated into Italy. Ticino was also claimed because the region had belonged to the Duchy of Milan from the mid-fourteenth century until 1515, as well as being inhabited by Italian speakers of Italian ethnicity. Claim was also raised on the basis that areas now part of Graubünden in the Mesolcina valley and Hinterrhein were held by the Milanese Trivulzio family, who ruled from the Mesocco Castle in the late 15th century. Also during the summer of 1940, Galeazzo Ciano met with Hitler and Ribbentrop and proposed to them the dissection of Switzerland along the central chain of the Western Alps, which would have left Italy also with the canton of Valais in addition to the claims raised earlier.

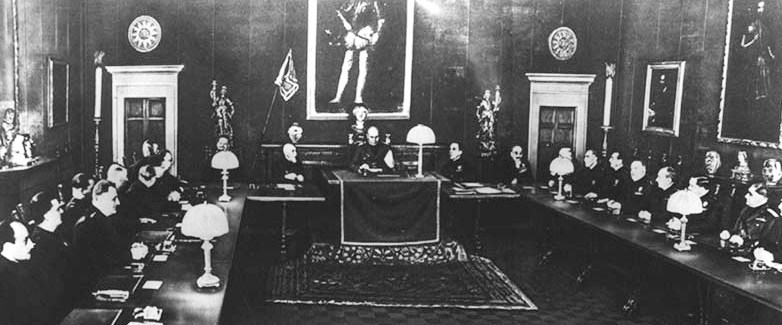
The session of the Grand Council of 9 May 1936, where the Italian Empire was proclaimed

To the south, the regime claimed the archipelago of Malta, which had been ruled by the British Empire since 1800. Mussolini claimed that the Maltese language was a dialect of Italian and theories about Malta being the cradle of the Latin civilization were promoted. Italian had been widely used in Malta in the literary, scientific and legal fields and it was one of Malta's official languages until 1937 when its status was abolished by the British as a response to Italy's invasion of Ethiopia. Italian irredentists had claimed that territories on the coast of North Africa were Italy's Fourth Shore and used the historical Roman rule in North Africa as a precedent to justify the incorporation of such territories to Italian jurisdiction as being a "return" of Italy to North Africa. In January 1939, Italy annexed territories in Libya that it considered within Italy's Fourth Shore, with Libya's four coastal provinces of Tripoli, Misurata, Benghazi and Derna becoming an integral part of metropolitan Italy. At the same time, indigenous Libyans were given the ability to apply for "Special Italian Citizenship", which required such people to be literate in the Italian language and confined this type of citizenship to be valid in Libya only. Tunisia, ruled by the French Empire as a protectorate since 1881, had the highest concentration of Italians in North Africa; its seizure by France had been viewed as an injury to national honour in Italy at what they perceived as a "loss" of Tunisia from Italian plans to incorporate it. Upon entering World War II, Italy declared its intention to seize Tunisia as well as the province of Constantine of Algeria from France.

To the south, the fascist regime held an interest in expanding Italy's African colonial possessions. In the 1920s, Italy regarded Portugal as a weak country that was unbecoming of a colonial power due to its weak hold on its colonies and mismanagement of them, and as such Italy desired to annexe Portugal's colonies as well. Italy's relations with Portugal were influenced by the rise to power of the authoritarian conservative nationalist dictatorship of António de Oliveira Salazar, which borrowed fascist methods, though Salazar upheld Portugal's traditional alliance with the United Kingdom.

==== Racism ====
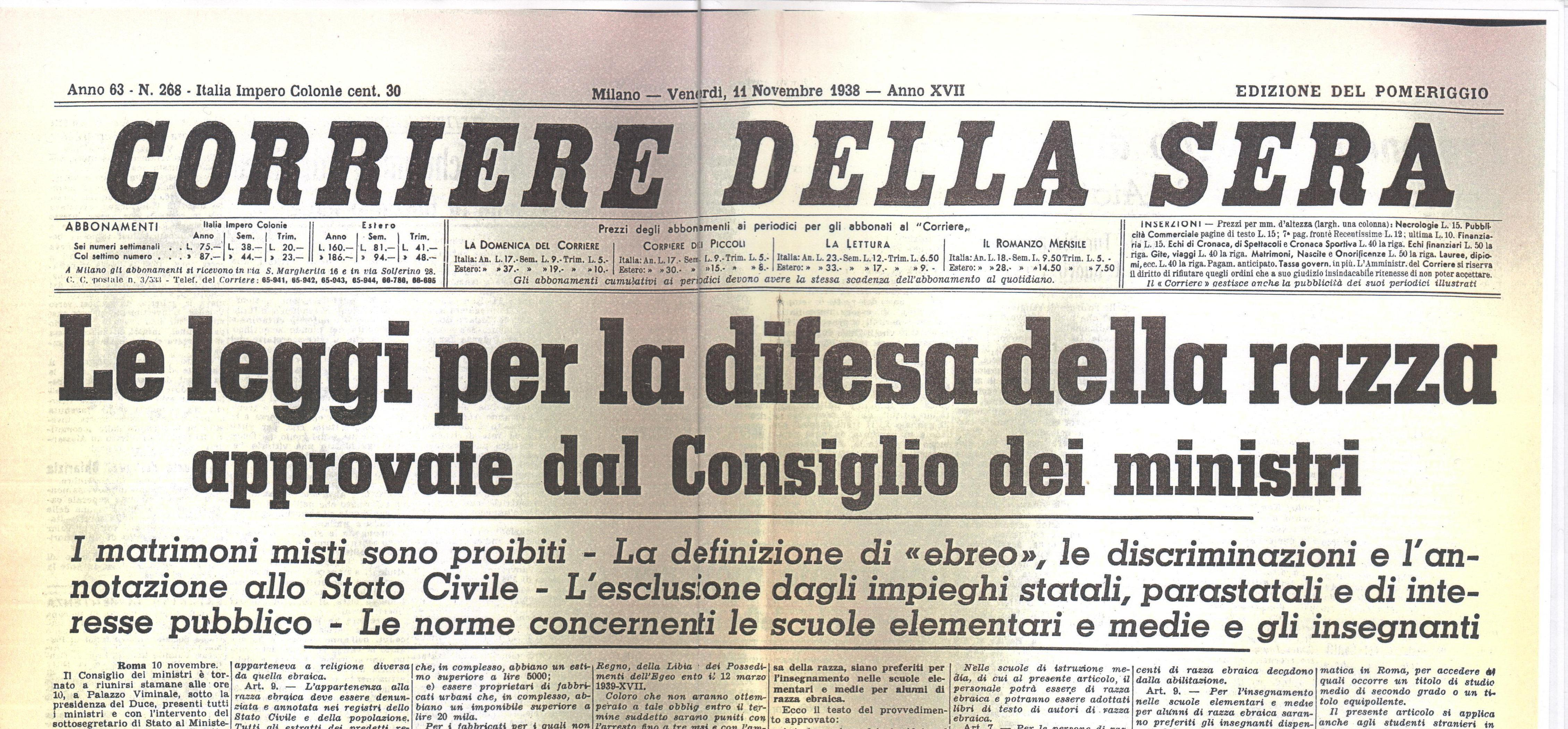
Front page of the Italian newspaper Corriere della Sera on 11 November 1938: "Le leggi per la difesa della razza approvate dal Consiglio dei ministri" (English: "The laws for the defence of race approved by the Council of Ministers"). On the same day, the Racial Laws entered into force under the Italian Fascist regime, enacting the racial discrimination and persecution of Italian Jews.

Until Benito Mussolini's personal friendship with Adolf Hitler and the military-political alliance between Fascist Italy and Nazi Germany, he had always denied any antisemitism within the National Fascist Party (PNF). In the early 1920s, Mussolini wrote an article which stated that Fascism would never elevate a "Jewish Question" and that "Italy knows no antisemitism and we believe that it will never know it" and then elaborated "let us hope that Italian Jews will continue to be sensible enough so as not to give rise to antisemitism in the only country where it has never existed". In 1932 during a conversation with Emil Ludwig, Mussolini described antisemitism as a "German vice" and stated: "There was 'no Jewish Question' in Italy and could not be one in a country with a healthy system of government". On several occasions, Mussolini spoke positively about Jews and the Zionist movement. Mussolini had initially rejected Nazi racism, especially the idea of a master race, as "arrant nonsense, stupid and idiotic".

In 1929, Mussolini acknowledged the contributions of Italian Jews to Italian society, despite their minority status, and believed that Jewish culture was Mediterranean, aligning with his early Mediterraneanist perspective. He also argued that Italian Jews were natives to Italy, as they had been living in the Italian Peninsula since Roman times. Initially, Fascist Italy did not enact comprehensive racist policies like those policies which were enacted by its World War II Axis partner Nazi Germany. Italy's National Fascist Party leader, Benito Mussolini, expressed different views on the subject of race throughout his career. In an interview conducted in 1932 at the Palazzo Venezia in Rome, he said "Race? It is a feeling, not a reality: ninety-five percent, at least, is a feeling. Nothing will ever make me believe that biologically pure races can be shown to exist today". After the repression of anti-colonial resistance in Italian Libya (1911–1932) and the Second Italo-Ethiopian War (1935–1936), the Italian Fascist government implemented strict racial segregation between Italians and Africans in all colonies of the Italian Empire.

The 40 Chinese immigrants that were incarcerated and subsequently converted to Catholicism in the Isola del Gran Sasso concentration camp, August 1941.

By 1938, Mussolini began to actively support racist policies in the Italian Fascist regime, as evidenced by his endorsement of the Manifesto of Race, the seventh point of which stated that "it is time that Italians proclaim themselves to be openly racist", although Mussolini said that the Manifesto was endorsed "entirely for political reasons", in deference to Nazi German wishes. The Manifesto of Race was published on 14 July 1938, paving the way for the enactment of the Racial Laws. Leading members of the National Fascist Party, such as Dino Grandi and Italo Balbo, reportedly opposed the Racial Laws. Balbo, in particular, regarded antisemitism as having nothing to do with fascism and staunchly opposed the antisemitic laws. After 1938, racial discrimination and persecution of ethnic minorities in Fascist Italy intensified and became an increasingly important hallmark of Italian Fascist ideology and policies. Nevertheless, Mussolini and the Italian military did not consistently apply the laws adopted in the Manifesto of Race. In 1943, shortly after the downfall of the Italian Fascist regime, Mussolini expressed regret for the endorsement, saying that it could have been avoided.

=== Totalitarianism ===
In 1925, the National Fascist Party (PNF) declared that Italy's fascist state would be totalitarian. The term "totalitarian" had initially been used as a pejorative accusation by Italy's liberal opposition that denounced the fascist movement for seeking to create a total dictatorship. However, the fascists responded by accepting that they were totalitarian, but presented totalitarianism from a positive viewpoint. Mussolini described totalitarianism as seeking to forge an authoritarian national state that would be capable of completing Risorgimento of the Italia Irredenta, forge a powerful modern Italy and create a new kind of citizen – politically active fascist Italians. The Doctrine of Fascism (La dottrina del fascismo, 1932) by the actualist Italian philosopher Giovanni Gentile is the official formulation of Italian fascism, ghostwritten by Gentile and published under Benito Mussolini's name in 1932. It described the totalitarian nature of Italian fascism, stating the following:

Fascism is for the only liberty which can be a serious thing, the liberty of the state and of the individual in the state. Therefore for the fascist, everything is in the state, and no human or spiritual thing exists, or has any sort of value, outside the state. In this sense fascism is totalitarian, and the fascist state which is the synthesis and unity of every value, interprets, develops and strengthens the entire life of the people.

— Benito Mussolini and Giovanni Gentile, The Doctrine of Fascism (1932)

American journalist H. R. Knickerbocker wrote in 1941: "Mussolini's Fascist state is the least terroristic of the three totalitarian states. The terror is so mild in comparison with the Soviet or Nazi varieties, that it almost fails to qualify as terroristic at all." As example he described an Italian journalist friend who refused to become a fascist. He was fired from his newspaper and put under 24-hour surveillance, but otherwise not harassed; his employment contract was settled for a lump sum and he was allowed to work for the foreign press. Knickerbocker contrasted his treatment with the inevitable torture and execution under Stalin or Hitler, and stated "you have a fair idea of the comparative mildness of the Italian kind of totalitarianism".

However, since World War II historians have noted that in Italy's colonies Italian fascism displayed extreme levels of violence. The deaths of one-tenth of the population of the Italian colony of Libya occurred during the fascist era, including from the use of gassings, concentration camps, starvation and disease. Similarly, in Ethiopia during the Second Italo-Ethiopian War and afterwards by 1938 a quarter of a million Ethiopians had died, including through massacres like the Yekatit 12 and concentration camps (e.g. Danane in Somalia, Nocra in Eritrea, and Akaki in Ethiopia).

=== Corporatist economics ===
Italian fascism promoted a corporatist economic system. The economy involved employer and employee syndicates being linked together in corporative associations to collectively represent the nation's economic producers and work alongside the state to set national economic policy. Mussolini declared such economics as a "Third Position" to capitalism and Marxism. For instance, he said in 1935 that orthodox capitalism no longer existed in the country. Preliminary plans as of 1939 intended to divide the country into 22 corporations which would send representatives to Parliament from each industry.

State permission was required for almost any business activity, such as expanding a factory, merging a business, or to fire or lay off an employee. All wages were set by the government, and a minimum wage was imposed in Italy. Restrictions on labor increased. While corporations still could earn profits, Italian fascism supported criminalization of strikes by employees and lockouts by employers as illegal acts it deemed as prejudicial to the national community as a whole.

=== Age and gender roles ===
Members of the Opera Nazionale Balilla, a Fascist youth organization in Italy, early 1930s

The Italian fascists' political anthem was called Giovinezza ("Youth"). Fascism identifies the physical age period of youth as a critical time for the moral development of people that will affect society.

Italian fascism pursued what it called "moral hygiene" of youth, particularly regarding sexuality. Fascist Italy promoted what it considered normal sexual behaviour in youth while denouncing what it considered deviant sexual behaviour. It condemned pornography, most forms of birth control and contraceptive devices (with the exception of the condom), homosexuality and prostitution as deviant sexual behaviour. Fascist Italy regarded the promotion of male sexual excitation before puberty as the cause of criminality amongst male youth. Fascist Italy reflected the belief of most Italians that homosexuality was wrong. Instead of the traditional Catholic teaching that it was a sin, a new approach was taken, based on the contemporary psychoanalysis, that it was a social disease. Fascist Italy pursued an aggressive campaign to reduce prostitution of young women.

Mussolini perceived women's primary role to be childbearers while men were warriors, once saying that "war is to man what maternity is to the woman". In an effort to increase birth rates, the Italian fascist government initiated policies designed to reduce a need for families to be dependent on a dual-income. The most evident policy to lessen female participation in the workplace was a program to encourage large families, where parents were given subsidies for a second child, and proportionally increased subsidies for a third, fourth, fifth, and sixth child. Italian fascism called for women to be honoured as "reproducers of the nation" and the Italian fascist government held ritual ceremonies to honour women's role within the Italian nation. In 1934, Mussolini declared that employment of women was a "major aspect of the thorny problem of unemployment" and that for women working was "incompatible with childbearing". Mussolini went on to say that the solution to unemployment for men was the "exodus of women from the work force". Although the initial Fascist Manifesto contained a reference to universal suffrage, this broad opposition to feminism meant that when it granted women the right to vote in 1925 it was limited purely to voting in local elections, and only applied to a small section of the female population. Furthermore, this reform was quickly made redundant as local elections were abolished in 1926 as a part of the Exceptional Fascist Laws.

=== Tradition ===
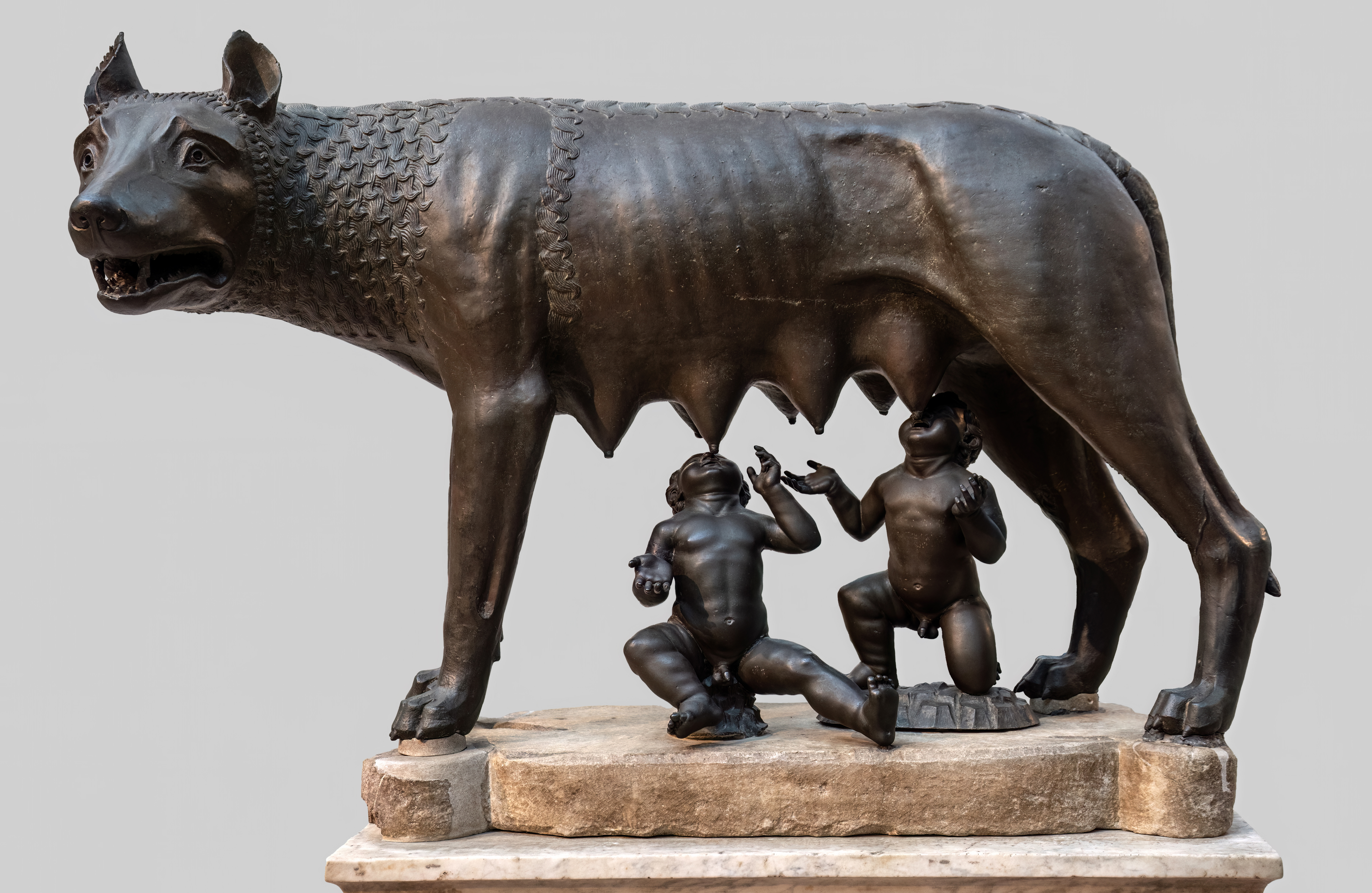
Roman she-wolf, symbol of the founding legend of Rome

Italian fascism believed that the success of Italian nationalism required a clear sense of a shared past amongst the Italian people along with a commitment to a modernized Italy. In a famous speech in 1926, Mussolini called for fascist art that was "traditionalist and at the same time modern, that looks to the past and at the same time to the future".

Ancient symbols of Roman civilization were utilized by the Italian fascists, particularly the fasces that symbolized unity, authority and the exercise of power. Other traditional symbols of ancient Rome used by the fascists included the she-wolf. The fasces and the she-wolf symbolized the shared Roman heritage of all the regions that constituted the Italian nation. In 1926, the fasces was adopted by the fascist government of Italy as a symbol of the state. In that year, the fascist government attempted to have the Italian national flag redesigned to incorporate the fasces on it. This attempt to incorporate the fasces on the flag was stopped by strong opposition to the proposal by Italian monarchists. Afterwards, the fascist government in public ceremonies rose the national tricolour flag along with a fascist black flag. Years later, and after Mussolini was forced from power by the King in 1943 only to be rescued by German forces, the Italian Social Republic founded by Mussolini and the fascists did incorporate the fasces on the state's war flag, which was a variant of the Italian tricolour national flag.

The issue of the rule of monarchy or republic in Italy was an issue that changed several times through the development of Italian fascism, as initially the fascist movement was republican and denounced the Savoy monarchy. However, Mussolini tactically abandoned republicanism in 1922 and recognized that the acceptance of the monarchy was a necessary compromise to gain the support of the establishment to challenge the liberal constitutional order that also supported the monarchy. King Victor Emmanuel III had become a popular ruler in the aftermath of Italy's gains after World War I and the army held close loyalty to the King, thus any idea of overthrowing the monarchy was discarded as foolhardy by the fascists at this point. Importantly, fascism's recognition of monarchy provided fascism with a sense of historical continuity and legitimacy. The fascists publicly identified King Victor Emmanuel II, the first King of a reunited Italy who had initiated the Risorgimento, along with other historic Italian figures such as Gaius Marius, Julius Caesar, Giuseppe Mazzini, Camillo Benso, Count of Cavour, Giuseppe Garibaldi and others, for being within a tradition of dictatorship in Italy that the fascists declared that they emulated. However, this compromise with the monarchy did not yield a cordial relationship between the King and Mussolini. Although Mussolini had formally accepted the monarchy, he pursued and largely achieved reducing the power of the King to that of a figurehead. The King initially held complete nominal legal authority over the military through the Statuto Albertino, but this was ended during the fascist regime when Mussolini created the position of First Marshal of the Empire in 1938, a two-person position of control over the military held by both the King and the head of government that had the effect of eliminating the King's previously exclusive legal authority over the military by giving Mussolini equal legal authority to the King over the military. In the 1930s, Mussolini became aggravated by the monarchy's continued existence due to envy of the fact that his counterpart in Germany Adolf Hitler was both head of state and head of government of a republic; and Mussolini in private denounced the monarchy and indicated that he had plans to dismantle the monarchy and create a republic with himself as head of state of Italy upon an Italian success in the then-anticipated major war about to erupt in Europe.

After being removed from office and placed under arrest by the King in 1943, with the Kingdom of Italy's new non-fascist government switching sides from the Axis Powers to the Allies, Italian fascism returned to republicanism and condemnation of the monarchy. On 18 September 1943, Mussolini made his first public address to the Italian people since his rescue from arrest by allied German forces, in which he commended the loyalty of Hitler as an ally while condemning King Victor Emmanuel III of the Kingdom of Italy for betraying Italian fascism. On the topic of the monarchy removing him from power and dismantling the fascist regime, Mussolini stated: "It is not the regime that has betrayed the monarchy, it is the monarchy that has betrayed the regime" and that "When a monarchy fails in its duties, it loses every reason for being. ... The state we want to establish will be national and social in the highest sense of the word; that is, it will be fascist, thus returning to our origins". The fascists at this point did not denounce the House of Savoy in the entirety of its history and credited Victor Emmanuel II for his rejection of "scornfully dishonourable pacts" and denounced Victor Emmanuel III for betraying Victor Emmanuel II by entering a dishonourable pact with the Allies.

The relationship between Italian fascism and the Roman Catholic Church was mixed, as originally the fascists were highly anti-clerical and hostile to Roman Catholicism, though from the mid to late 1920s anti-clericalism lost ground in the movement as Mussolini in power sought to seek accord with the Church, as it held major influence on Italian society, with most Italians being Roman Catholic. In 1929, the Fascist regime signed the Lateran Treaty with the Holy See, a concordat between the Kingdom of Italy and the Roman Catholic Church that allowed for the creation of a small enclave known as Vatican City as a sovereign state representing the papacy. This ended years of perceived alienation between the Church and the Italian government after Italy annexed the Papal States in 1870. Italian fascism justified its adoption of antisemitic laws in 1938 by claiming that Italy was fulfilling the Christian religious mandate of the Roman Catholic Church that had been initiated by Pope Innocent III in the Fourth Lateran Council of 1215, whereby the Pope issued strict regulation on the life of Jews in Christian lands. Jews were prohibited from holding any public office that would give them power over Christians, and were required to wear distinctive clothing to distinguish them from Christians.

== Doctrine ==
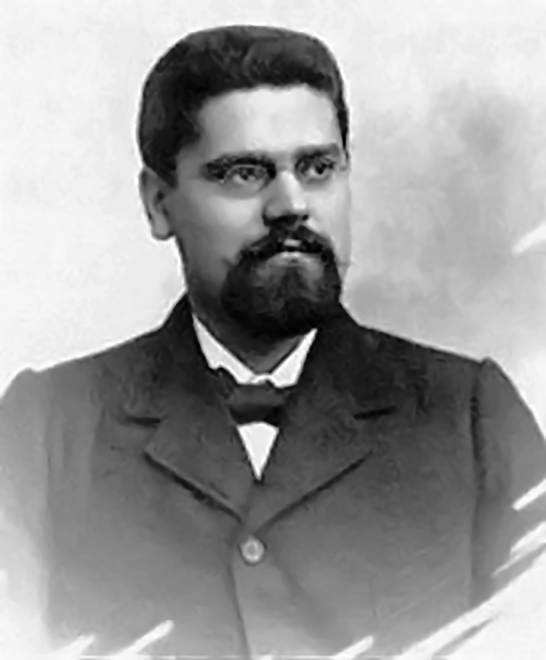
Giovanni Gentile, ideologue and philosophical father of Italian fascism. He was the ghostwriter of The Doctrine of Fascism and author of the Manifesto of the Fascist Intellectuals.

The Doctrine of Fascism (La dottrina del fascismo, 1932), authored by the actualist Italian philosopher Giovanni Gentile, is the official formulation of Italian fascism, ghostwritten by Gentile himself and published under Benito Mussolini's name in 1932. Gentile was intellectually influenced by Plato, G. W. F. Hegel, Benedetto Croce, and Giambattista Vico; thus, his actualist idealism was the basis for the fascist ideology. Hence, the Doctrine's Weltanschauung proposes the world as action in the realm of humanity—beyond the quotidian constrictions of contemporary political trend, by rejecting "perpetual peace" as fantastical, and accepting mankind as a species continually at war; those who meet the challenge, achieve nobility. To wit, actual idealism generally accepted that conquerors were the men of historical consequence, e.g. the Macedonian Alexander the Great, the Roman Julius Caesar, the Frank Charlemagne, and the French Napoleon. The philosopher–intellectual Gentile was especially inspired by the civilization, cultural heritage, military conquests, and political hegemony of the Roman Empire (27 BCE – 476 CE), and the way of life of ancient Romans, from whence Italian fascism derives its philosophical ideals and political aspiration:

The Fascist accepts and loves life; he rejects and despises suicide as cowardly. Life as he understands it means duty, elevation, conquest; life must be lofty and full, it must be lived for oneself but above all for others, both near by and far off, present and future.

— Giovanni Gentile and Benito Mussolini, The Doctrine of Fascism, 1932

Gentile defined fascism as an anti-positivist and anti-intellectual doctrine, epistemologically based on faith rather than reason. Fascist mysticism emphasized the importance of political myths, which were true not as empirical facts, but as "meta-reality". Fascist visual arts, architecture, cinema, radio and press, and symbolism constituted a process which converted Fascism into a sort of a civil religion or political religion in Italy. La dottrina del fascismo states that fascism is a "religious conception of life" and forms a "spiritual community" in contrast to bourgeois materialism. Fascist slogans such as Credere, Obbedire, Combattere ("Believe, Obey, Fight") reflect the importance of political faith in Italian fascism.

Emblem of the National Fascist Party (PNF)

The earliest Italian fascist political organization, Fasces of Revolutionary Action (Fasci d'Azione Rivoluzionaria), inspired by the programmatic manifesto of the Revolutionary Fasces of Internationalist Action (Fascio Rivoluzionario d'Azione Internazionalista) written by the Italian national syndicalist Alceste De Ambris and left-wing interventionist Filippo Corridoni (5 October 1914), was founded by the then-journalist Benito Mussolini in 1915. Its successor, the Italian Fasces of Combat (Fasci Italiani di Combattimento), was co-founded in Milan by Mussolini, Futurist poet and art theorist Filippo Tommaso Marinetti, and WWI veteran and poet Giuseppe Ungaretti, and its politico-philosophical tenets were presented through The Manifesto of the Fascist Struggle (Il manifesto dei fasci italiani di combattimento, June 1919), written by Marinetti and De Ambris. It was divided into four sections, describing the movement's objectives in political, social, military, and financial fields. According to Israeli historian Zeev Sternhell, "most syndicalist leaders were among the founders of the fascist movement", who in later years gained key posts in Mussolini's regime. Mussolini expressed great admiration for the ideas of French philosopher and social theorist Georges Sorel, who he claimed was instrumental in birthing the core principles of Italian fascism. Israeli historian J. L. Talmon argued that fascism billed itself "not only as an alternative, but also as the heir to socialism".

La dottrina del fascismo proposed an Italy of greater living standards under a one-party fascist system than under the multi-party liberal democratic Giolitti government of 1920. As the leader of the National Fascist Party (PNF: Partito Nazionale Fascista), Mussolini said that democracy is "beautiful in theory; in practice, it is a fallacy" and spoke of celebrating the burial of the "putrid corpse of liberty". In 1923, to give Deputy Mussolini control of the pluralist parliamentary government of the Kingdom of Italy (1861–1946), an Italian economist, the Baron Giacomo Acerbo, proposed—and the Italian Parliament approved—the Acerbo Law, changing the electoral system from proportional representation to majority representation. The party who received the most votes (provided they possessed at least 25 percent of cast votes) won two-thirds of the Parliament; the remaining third was proportionately shared among the other parties; thus, the fascist manipulation of liberal democratic law rendered Italy a one-party state.

In 1924, the PNF won the election with 65 percent of the votes, yet the United Socialist Party (PSU) refused to accept such a defeat—especially Deputy Giacomo Matteotti, who on 30 May 1924 in Parliament formally accused the PNF of electoral fraud and reiterated his denunciation of squadrismo to the Parliament, a form of political repression and politically-motivated violence perpetrated by the Blackshirts against Italian citizens and non-fascist politicians; at that time, he was publishing a book substantiating his accusations, The Fascists Exposed: A Year of Fascist Domination. Consequently, on 10 June 1924, the Ceka (ostensibly a party secret police, modelled on the Soviet Cheka) assassinated Matteotti and of the five men arrested, Amerigo Dumini, also known as Sicario del Duce ("The Leader's Assassin"), was sentenced to five years' imprisonment for murder but served only eleven months, and was freed under amnesty from King Victor Emmanuel III.

Moreover, when the King endorsed Mussolini as Prime Minister in the aftermath of Matteotti's murder, all members of the Italian Socialist Party, Italian Liberal Party, Italian People's Party, and Communist Party of Italy from the Chamber of Deputies quit the Parliament in protest through the Aventine Secession, leaving the fascists to govern unopposed. At that time, assassination was not yet the modus operandi norm and the Italian fascist Duce usually disposed of opponents in the Imperial Roman way: political arrest punished with island banishment (confino). In 1925, after Mussolini's rise to power, he assumed the title Duce ("Leader"), derived from the Latin dux ("leader"), a Roman Republic military-command title. Although Fascist Italy (1922–1943) is considered to be an authoritarian–totalitarian dictatorship by contemporary historians, its government retained the original "liberal democratic" façade: the Grand Council of Fascism remained active as administrators; and King Victor Emmanuel III still held legal authority over Mussolini and all other subjects of his kingdom; hence, he could—at the risk of his crown—dismiss Mussolini as Prime Minister anytime he wanted, as he eventually did on 25 July 1943.

== Factions within the movement ==
In the early 1920s the Italian fascist movement was not ideologically uniform, and historian Stanley G. Payne identifies several currents that coexisted within it and competed over what the fascist "revolution" would mean.

=== Fascist left ===
The most coherent group on the left of the movement was the national syndicalists, led by Sergio Panunzio, A. O. Olivetti, and Edmondo Rossoni, who headed the fascist syndicalist confederation (CNCS). They wanted to replace parliamentary liberalism with a syndicalist structure that would, in their view, serve workers and the wider population, produce a more authentically national and representative government than a parliament dominated by political parties, and bring about a real revolution through the modernization of the economy.

Smaller dissident currents lay further to the left. One, associated with the journalist Curzio Malaparte, wanted fascism to carry out a "revolution of the people" that would reflect what the populist left regarded as genuine Italian popular culture. Other minor sectors of the extreme left, sometimes described as "free fascism", favoured a progressive and leftist revolution of "liberty" under the fascist banner.

=== Fascist right ===
The "fascist right", or hardliners, comprised two distinct sectors. The first came from the most intransigent squadristi and their leaders, who sought to extend fascist violence into a complete dictatorship. The second consisted of most of the former members of the Italian Nationalist Association, whose ideological leader was Alfredo Rocco. Rocco favoured a fully articulated, authoritarian corporate state to replace the liberal system, which would build a united and culturally renewed Italy and actively pursue imperialism.

Payne notes that these two sectors differed considerably. The former Nationalists wanted no extended "fascist revolution", only a revamped authoritarian corporate state that would merge with the existing elite. Some of the more moderate former nationalists, such as Luigi Federzoni, were closer to the revisionists than to Rocco's full authoritarian corporatism.

=== Minor currents ===
Payne describes several smaller groups:

- Catholic fascists (clerico-fascisti), who had joined only from 1921 and wanted to reconcile the originally anti-Catholic movement with Catholicism, an aim Mussolini had himself courted for some time.
- Monarchist fascists, a small group who wanted to use fascism's strength not for a fascist revolution but to establish a more traditional dictatorship of absolute monarchy under Victor Emmanuel III.
- Cultural or idealist fascists, most notably the philosopher Giovanni Gentile, who aspired to lead a cultural revolution.
- Neopagan elitists, described as perhaps the most unusual current: a small group seeking to revive the aristocratic culture of ancient Rome through extreme elitism, Roman imperialism, and a mystical ethos drawn from the pagan occult. Its leading theorist was Julius Evola.

=== Mussolini and the 1924 election ===
According to Payne, Mussolini found no solution to the party's dilemma and struggled to define the future course of his government. He still depended on a parliamentary majority, and he looked for ways to create a more genuinely fascist or pro-fascist parliament, which led to the Acerbo Law. Elections in April 1924, held amid considerable violence and intimidation, gave the fascist-led listone (a coalition of fascists, moderates, and conservatives) a reported 66 per cent of the vote and 403 seats. Mussolini nevertheless remained uncertain how to proceed and even considered a deal with moderate Socialists or the CGL, but fascist hardliners insisted that no compromise would be acceptable.

== Conditions which precipitated the rise of fascism ==
=== Nationalist discontent ===
Map indicating Italian-inhabited territories (bright green) within the Austro-Hungarian Empire in 1911

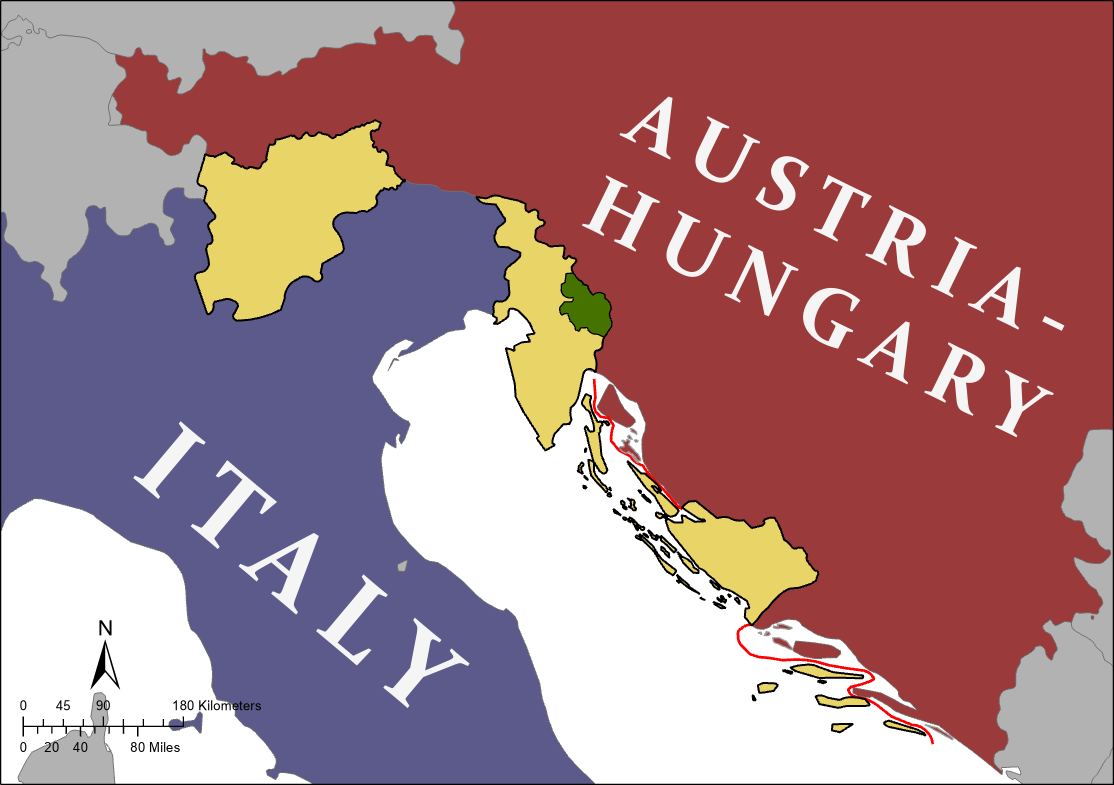
Territories promised to Italy by the Treaty of London (1915): South Tyrol/Trentino-Alto Adige (tan), the Julian March and Dalmatia (tan), and the Snežnik Plateau area (green). After the end of World War I (1914–1918), Dalmatia was not assigned to Italy but to Yugoslavia.

After the end of World War I (1914–1918), despite the Kingdom of Italy (1861–1946) being a full-partner Allied Power against the Central Powers, both Italian nationalists and fascists claimed that Italy had been cheated in the Treaty of Saint-Germain-en-Laye (1919); thus, the Allies had impeded Italy's progress to becoming a "Great Power". Thenceforth, the National Fascist Party (PNF) successfully exploited that "slight" to Italian nationalism in presenting fascism as best-suited for governing the country by successfully claiming that democracy, socialism, and liberalism were failed political systems. The PNF arose to power in Italy after the March on Rome in October 1922, consequent to the fascist leader Benito Mussolini's oratory and Blackshirts' paramilitary political violence.

At the Paris Peace Conference in 1919, the Allies compelled the Kingdom of Italy to yield the Croatian seaport of Fiume (Rijeka) to the Kingdom of Yugoslavia. Moreover, elsewhere Italy was then excluded from the wartime secret Treaty of London (1915) it had concorded with the Triple Entente; wherein Italy was to leave the Triple Alliance and join the enemy by declaring war against the German Empire and Austria-Hungary in exchange for territories at war's end, upon which the Kingdom of Italy held claims (South Tyrol/Trentino-Alto Adige, the Austrian Littoral, Istria, Dalmatia, the Julian March, and the Snežnik Plateau) based on terms set by the Treaty of London in 1915 (see Mutilated victory).

In September 1919, the nationalist response of outraged Italian novelist, poet, and war hero Gabriele D'Annunzio was declaring the establishment of the Italian Regency of Carnaro. To his independent Italian state, he installed himself as the Regent Duce and promulgated the Carta del Carnaro (Charter of Carnaro, 8 September 1920), a politically syncretic constitutional amalgamation of right-wing and left-wing anarchist, proto-fascist, and democratic republican politics, which much influenced the politico-philosophic development of early Italian fascism. Consequent to the Treaty of Rapallo (1920), the metropolitan Italian military deposed the Regency of Duce D'Annunzio on Christmas 1920. In the development of the fascist model of government, D'Annunzio was a nationalist and not a fascist, whose legacy of political–praxis ("Politics as Theatre") was stylistic (ceremony, uniform, harangue and chanting) and not substantive, which Italian Fascism artfully developed as a government model.

At the same time, Mussolini and many of his revolutionary syndicalist adherents gravitated towards a form of revolutionary nationalism in an effort to "identify the 'communality' of man not with class, but with the nation". According to A. James Gregor, Mussolini came to believe that "Fascism was the only form of 'socialism' appropriate to the proletarian nations of the twentieth century" while he was in the process of shifting his views from socialism to nationalism. Enrico Corradini, one of the early influences on Mussolini's thought and later a member of his administration, championed the concept of proletarian nationalism, writing about Italy in 1910: "We are the proletarian people in respect to the rest of the world. Nationalism is our socialism". Mussolini would come to use similar wording, for instance referring to fascist Italy during World War II as the "proletarian nations that rise up against the plutocrats".

=== Labor unrest ===
A sociological study of violence in Italy (1919–1922) by text mining (arrow width proportional to number of violent acts between social groups; click on large animated GIF image to see evolution)

Given Italian fascism's pragmatic political amalgamations of left-wing and right-wing socio-economic policies, discontented workers and peasants proved an abundant source of popular political power, especially because of peasant opposition to socialist agricultural collectivism. Thus armed, the former socialist Benito Mussolini oratorically inspired and mobilized country and working-class people: "We declare war on socialism, not because it is socialist, but because it has opposed nationalism". Moreover, for campaign financing in the 1920–1921 period, the National Fascist Party (PNF) also courted the industrialists and historically feudal landowners by appealing to their fears of left-wing socialist and Bolshevik labor politics and urban and rural strikes. The fascists promised a good business climate of cost-effective labor, wage and political stability; and the fascist Party was en route to power.

Historian Charles F. Delzell reports: "At first, the Fascist Revolutionary Party was concentrated in Milan and a few other cities. They gained ground quite slowly, between 1919 and 1920; not until after the scare, brought about by the workers "occupation of the factories" in the late summer of 1920 did fascism become really widespread. The industrialists began to throw their financial support behind Mussolini after he renamed his party and retracted his former support for Lenin and the Russian Revolution. Moreover, toward the end of 1920, fascism began to spread into the countryside, bidding for the support of large landowners, particularly in the area between Bologna and Ferrara, a traditional stronghold of the Left, and scene of frequent violence. Socialist and Catholic organizers of farm hands in that region, Venezia Giulia, Tuscany, and even distant Apulia, were soon attacked by Blackshirt fascist squads, armed with castor oil, blackjacks, and more lethal weapons. The era of squadrismo and nightly expeditions to burn Socialist and Catholic labor headquarters had begun. During this time period, Mussolini's fascist squads also engaged in violent attacks against the Church where "several priests were assassinated and churches burned by the fascists".

== Empowerment of fascism ==
World War I inflated Italy's economy with great debts, unemployment (aggravated by thousands of demobilised soldiers), social discontent featuring general strikes, organized crime, and anarchist, socialist, and communist insurrections in the country and across Europe (1917–1923). The liberal-led Giolitti governments preferred fascist class collaboration to the Communist Party of Italy's class conflict should they assume government as had Vladimir Lenin's Bolsheviks in the recent Russian Revolution of 1917, although Mussolini had originally praised Lenin's October Revolution and publicly referred to himself in 1919 as "Lenin of Italy".

When the elected Italian Liberal Party (PLI) could not rule the country anymore due to social unrests, the fascist leader Benito Mussolini took matters in hand, combating those issues with the Blackshirts, paramilitary squads of WWI veterans and former socialists, when Prime Ministers such as Giovanni Giolitti allowed the fascists taking the law in hand. The political violence between socialist militants and the mostly self-organized Blackshirt fascist squads, especially in the countryside, had increased so dramatically that Mussolini was pressured to call a truce to bring about "reconciliation with the Socialists". Signed in early August 1921, Mussolini and the major representatives of the Italian Socialist Party (PSI) agreed to the Pact of Pacification, which was immediately condemned by most ras leaders in the squadrismo. The peace pact was officially denounced during the Third Fascist Congress on 7–10 November 1921.

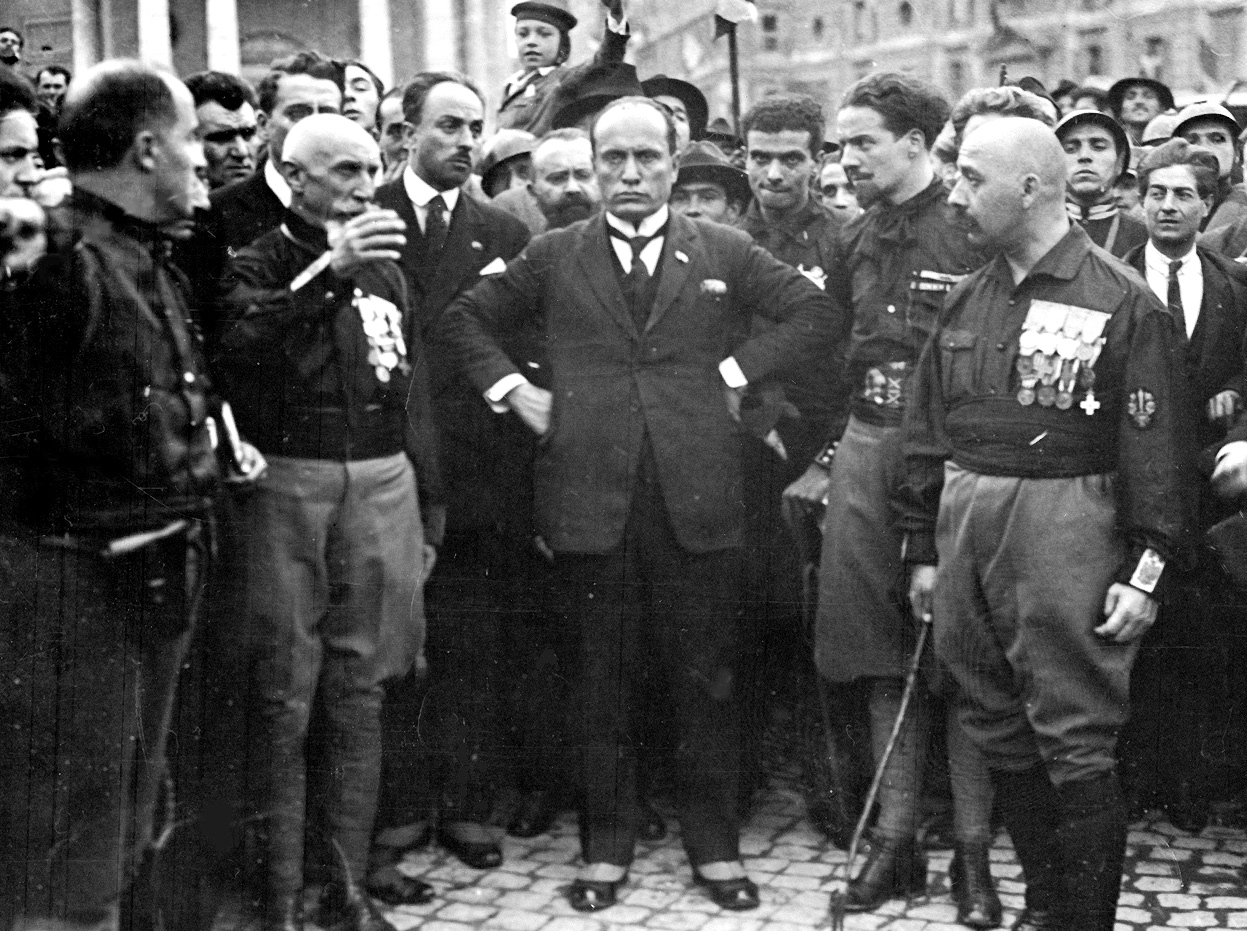
Mussolini and the fascist paramilitary Blackshirts' March on Rome in October 1922

Italy's use of daredevil elite shock troops, known as the Arditi, beginning in 1917, was an important influence on Italian fascism. The Arditi were soldiers who were specifically trained for a life of violence and wore unique blackshirt uniforms and fezzes. The Arditi formed a national organization in November 1918, the Associazione fra gli Arditi d'Italia, which by mid-1919 had about twenty thousand young men within it. Mussolini appealed to the Arditi and the Fascists' squadristi, developed after the war, were based upon the Arditi. By the early 1920s, popular support for the fascist movement's fight against Bolshevism numbered some 250,000 people. In 1921, the fascists metamorphosed into the PNF and achieved political legitimacy when Mussolini was elected to the Chamber of Deputies in 1922. Although the Liberal Party retained power, the governing prime ministries proved ephemeral, especially that of the fifth Prime Minister Luigi Facta, whose government proved vacillating.

To depose the weakened parliamentary democracy, Deputy Mussolini (with military, business, and liberal right-wing support) launched the March on Rome (27–31 October 1922) coup d'état to oust Prime Minister Luigi Facta and assume the government of Italy to restore nationalist pride, restart the economy, increase productivity with labor controls, remove economic business controls, and impose law and order. On 28 October, whilst the March occurred, King Victor Emmanuel III withdrew his support to the liberal-led Facta government and appointed Mussolini as the sixth Prime Minister of Italy. The March on Rome became a victory parade: the fascists believed their success was revolutionary and traditionalist.

=== Economy ===
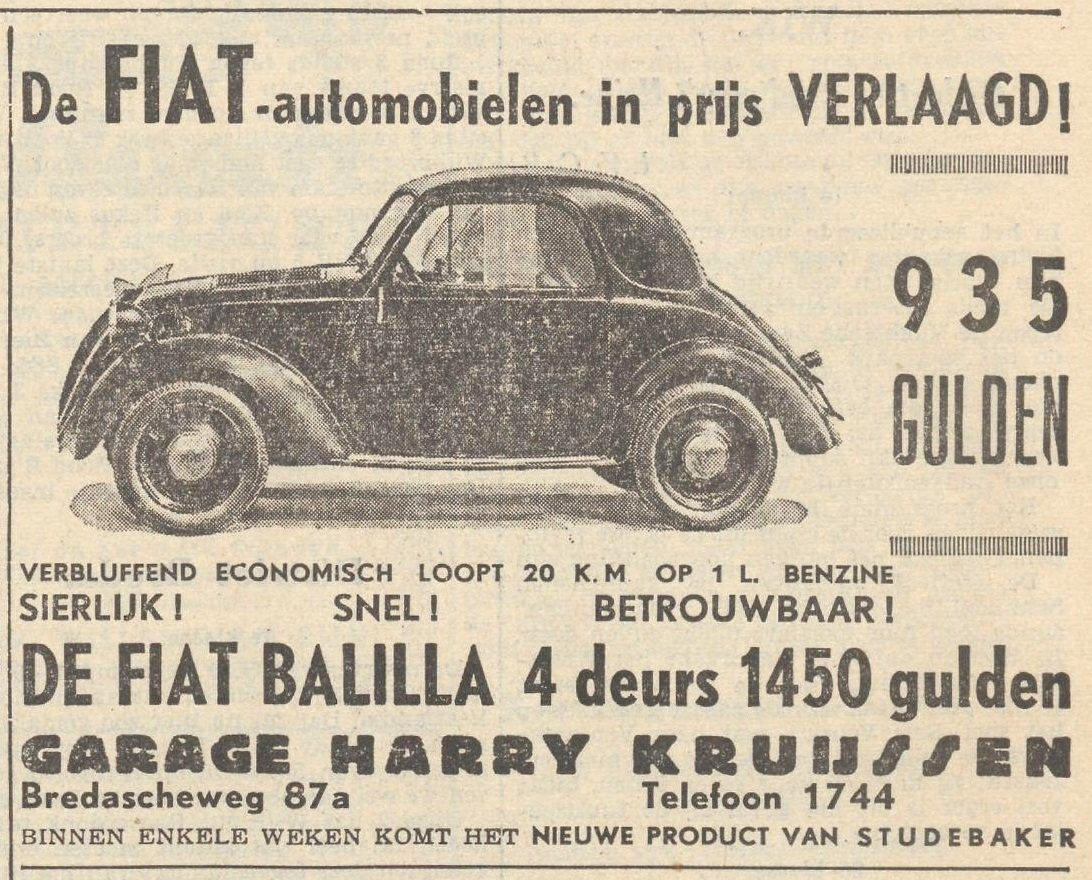
1939 Dutch Fiat advertisement

Until 1925, when the liberal economist Alberto de' Stefani, although a former member of the squadristi, was removed from his post as Minister of Economics (1922–1925), Italy's coalition government was able to restart the economy and balanced the national budget. Stefani developed economic policies that were aligned with classical liberalism principles as inheritance, luxury and foreign capital taxes were abolished; and life insurance (1923) and the state communications monopolies were privatised and so on. During Italy's coalition government era, pro-business policies apparently did not contradict the State's financing of banks and industry. Political scientist Franklin Hugh Adler referred to this coalition period between Mussolini's appointment as prime minister on 31 October 1922 and his 1925 dictatorship as "Liberal-Fascism, a hybrid, unstable, and transitory regime type under which the formal juridical-institutional framework of the liberal regime was conserved", which still allowed pluralism, competitive elections, freedom of the press and the right of trade unions to strike. Liberal Party leaders and industrialists thought that they could neutralize Mussolini by making him the head of a coalition government, where as Luigi Albertini remarked that "he will be much more subject to influence".

One of Prime Minister Mussolini's first acts was the 400-million-lira financing of Gio. Ansaldo & C., one of the country's most important engineering companies. Subsequent to the 1926 deflation crisis, banks such as the Banco di Roma (Bank of Rome), the Banco di Napoli (Bank of Naples) and the Banco di Sicilia (Bank of Sicily) also were state-financed. In 1924, a private business enterprise established Unione Radiofonica Italiana (URI) as part of the Marconi company, to which the Italian fascist Government granted official radio-broadcast monopoly. After the defeat of fascism in 1944, URI became Radio Audizioni Italiane (RAI) and was renamed RAI — Radiotelevisione Italiana with the advent of television in 1954.

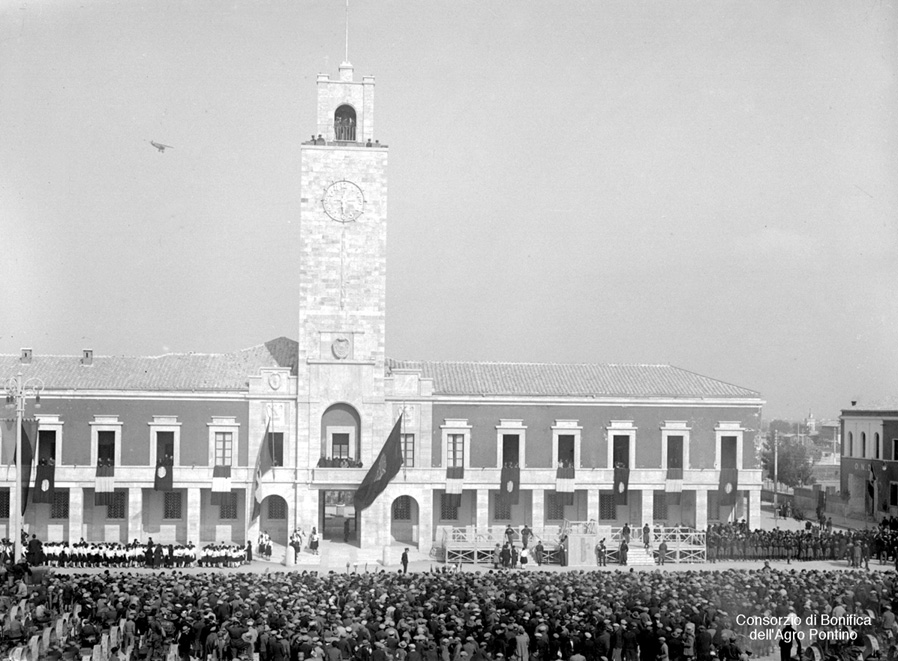
The inauguration of Littoria in 1932

Given the overwhelmingly rural nature of Italian economy in the period, agriculture was vital to fascist economic policies and propaganda. To strengthen the domestic Italian production of grain, the fascist Government established in 1925 protectionist policies that ultimately failed (see the Battle for Grain).

From 1926 following the Pact of the Vidoni Palace and the Syndical Laws, business and labour were organized into 12 separate associations, outlawing or integrating all others. These organizations negotiated labour contracts on behalf of all its members with the state acting as the arbitrator. The state tended to favour big industry over small industry, commerce, banking, agriculture, labour and transport even though each sector officially had equal representation. Pricing, production and distribution practices were controlled by employer associations rather than individual firms and labour syndicates negotiated collective labour contracts binding all firms in the particular sector. Enforcement of contracts was difficult and the large bureaucracy delayed resolutions of labour disputes.

After 1929, the fascist regime countered the Great Depression with massive public works programs, such as the draining of the Pontine Marshes, hydroelectricity development, railway improvement and rearmament. In 1933, the Istituto per la Ricostruzione Industriale (IRI – Institute for Industrial Reconstruction) was established to subsidize failing companies and soon controlled important portions of the national economy via government-linked companies, among them Alfa Romeo. The Italian economy's Gross National Product increased 2 percent; automobile production was increased, especially that of the Fiat motor company; and the aeronautical industry was developing. Especially after the 1936 League of Nations sanctions against Italian invasion of Ethiopia, Mussolini strongly advocated agrarianism and autarchy as part of his economic "battles" for Land, the Lira and Grain. As Prime Minister, Mussolini physically participated with the workers in doing the work; the "politics as theatre" legacy of Gabriele D' Annunzio yielded great propaganda images of Il Duce as "Man of the People".

A year after the creation of the IRI, Mussolini boasted to his Chamber of Deputies: "Three-fourths of the Italian economy, industrial and agricultural, is in the hands of the state". As Italy continued to nationalize its economy, the IRI "became the owner not only of the three most important Italian banks, which were clearly too big to fail, but also of the lion's share of the Italian industries". During this period, Mussolini identified his economic policies with "state capitalism" and "state socialism", which later was described as "economic dirigisme", an economic system where the state has the power to direct economic production and allocation of resources. By 1939, fascist Italy attained the highest rate of state–ownership of an economy in the world other than the Soviet Union, where the Italian state "controlled over four-fifths of Italy's shipping and shipbuilding, three-quarters of its pig iron production and almost half that of steel".

=== Relationship with the Catholic Church ===
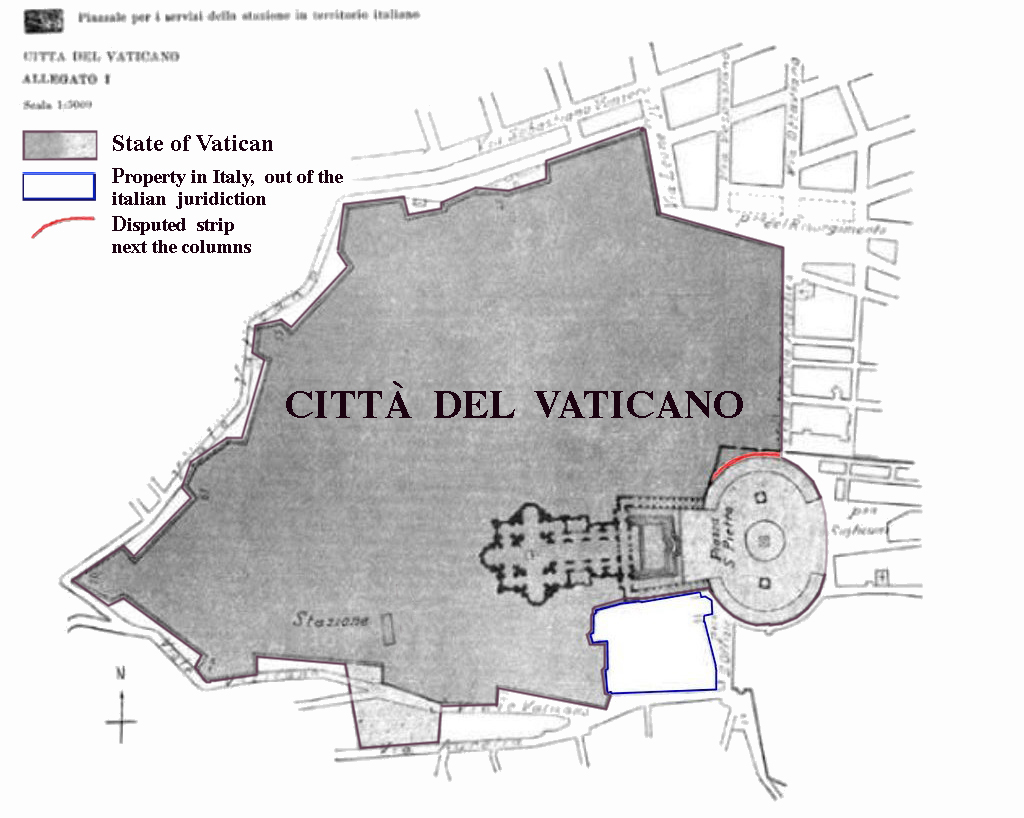
The "Roman Question" was resolved with the mutual recognition of the Kingdom of Italy and the Vatican City-State in 1929

In the 19th century, the Italian liberal, nationalist, and republican forces of Risorgimento (1815–1871) had conquered Rome and taken control of it away from the Papacy, which saw itself henceforth as a "prisoner in the Vatican". In February 1929, as Italian Head of Government, Mussolini concluded the unresolved Church–State conflict of the "Roman Question" (Questione Romana) with the Lateran Treaty between Fascist Italy and the Holy See, establishing the Vatican microstate in Rome. Upon ratification of the Lateran Treaty, the papacy recognized the state of Italy in exchange for diplomatic recognition of the Vatican City, territorial compensations, introduction of religious education into all state funded schools in Italy and 50 million pounds sterling that were shifted from Italian bank shares into a Swiss company Profima SA. British wartime records from the National Archives in Kew also confirmed Profima SA as the Vatican's company which was accused during World War II of engaging in "activities contrary to Allied interests". Cambridge historian John F. Pollard wrote in his book that this financial settlement ensured the "papacy [...] would never be poor again".

Not long after the Lateran Treaty was signed, Mussolini was almost "excommunicated" over his "intractable" determination to prevent the Vatican from having control over education. In reply, the Pope protested Mussolini's "pagan worship of the state" and the imposition of an "exclusive oath of obedience" that obligated everyone to uphold fascism. Once declaring in his youth that "religion is a species of mental disease", Mussolini "wanted the appearance of being greatly favoured by the Pope" while simultaneously "subordinate to no one". Mussolini's widow attested in her 1974 book that her husband was "basically irreligious until the later years of his life".

=== Influence outside Italy ===
After the March on Rome in October 1922, Italian fascism spread throughout Europe, becoming an influential model for other fascist organizations across the continent. In the twenty-one-year interbellum period, many artists, political scientists, and philosophers sought ideological inspiration from Fascist Italy. Mussolini's establishment of law and order to Italy and its society was praised by Winston Churchill, Sigmund Freud, George Bernard Shaw, and Thomas Edison, as the Italian fascist government combated organized crime and the Sicilian Mafia.

Italian fascism was copied by Adolf Hitler's Nazi Party (NSDAP), the Romanian National Fascist Movement (comprising the National Romanian Fascia and National Italo-Romanian Cultural and Economic Movement), the Russian Fascist Organization (RFO), and the Dutch fascist movement based upon the Verbond van Actualisten journal of H. A. Sinclair de Rochemont and Alfred Haighton. The Sammarinese Fascist Party (PFS) established an early fascist government in San Marino, and their politico-philosophic basis essentially was Italian fascism.

In the Kingdom of Yugoslavia, Serbian politician and economist Milan Stojadinović established the Yugoslav Radical Union (JRZ); they wore green shirts and Šajkača caps, and used the Roman salute. Stojadinović also adopted the title of Vodja (a Slavic term with the same meaning as Duce or Führer). In Switzerland, pro-Nazi Colonel Arthur Fonjallaz of the National Front became an ardent Mussolini admirer after visiting Fascist Italy in 1932, and advocated the Italian annexation of Switzerland whilst receiving fascist foreign aid. The country was host for two Italian politico-cultural activities: the International Centre for Fascist Studies (CINEF: Centre International d' Études Fascistes) and the 1934 congress of the Action Committee for the Universality of Rome (CAUR: Comitato d'Azione della Università di Roma).

In Portugal and Brazil, fascist and para-fascist mass movements that took inspiration from Italian fascism contributed to the establishment of quasi-fascist authoritarian dictatorships in both countries: the Ditadura Nacional ("National Dictatorship") under António de Oliveira Salazar and the Estado Novo ("New State") under Getúlio Vargas, respectively. In Spain, the writer Ernesto Giménez Caballero in Genio de España (The Genius of Spain, 1932) called for the Italian annexation of Spain, led by Mussolini presiding over an international Latin Catholic empire. He then progressed to become more closely associated with Falangism, which led him to discard his former idea of a Spanish annexation to Fascist Italy.

== Italian fascist intellectuals ==
- Benito Mussolini
- Massimo Bontempelli
- Giuseppe Bottai
- Enrico Corradini
- Carlo Costamagna
- Julius Evola
- Enrico Ferri
- Giovanni Gentile
- Corrado Gini
- Agostino Lanzillo
- Curzio Malaparte
- Filippo Tommaso Marinetti
- Robert Michels
- Angelo Oliviero Olivetti
- Sergio Panunzio
- Giovanni Papini
- Giuseppe Prezzolini
- Alfredo Rocco
- Edmondo Rossoni
- Margherita Sarfatti
- Ardengo Soffici
- Ugo Spirito
- Giuseppe Ungaretti
- Gioacchino Volpe

== Italian fascist slogans ==
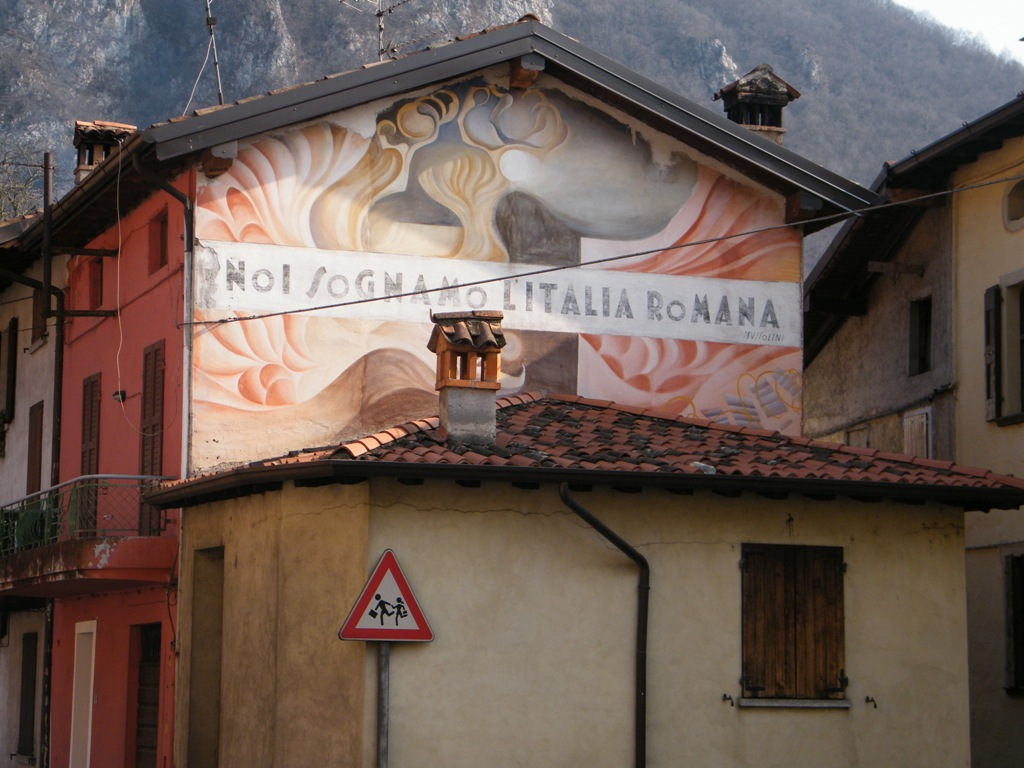
"We dream of a Roman Italy" was one of the many fascist slogans.

- Me ne frego ("I don't give a damn!"), the Italian fascist motto.
- Libro e moschetto, fascista perfetto ("Book and musket, perfect fascist").
- Tutto nello Stato, niente al di fuori dello Stato, nulla contro lo Stato ("Everything in the State, nothing outside the State, nothing against the State").
- Credere, obbedire, combattere ("Believe, Obey, Fight").
- Chi si ferma è perduto ("He who hesitates is lost").
- Se avanzo, seguitemi; se indietreggio, uccidetemi; se muoio, vendicatemi ("If I advance, follow me. If I retreat, kill me. If I die, avenge me"). Borrowed from French Royalist General Henri de la Rochejaquelein.
- Viva il Duce ("Long live the Leader").
- La guerra è per l'uomo come la maternità è per la donna ("War is to man as motherhood is to woman").
- Boia chi molla ("Who gives up is a rogue"); the first meaning of "boia" is "executioner, hangman", but in this context it means "scoundrel, rogue, villain, blackguard, knave, lowlife" and it can also be used as an exclamation of strong irritation or disappointment or as a pejoratively superlative adjective (e.g. tempo boia, "awful weather").
- Molti nemici, molto onore ("Many enemies, much Honor").
- È l'aratro che traccia il solco, ma è la spada che lo difende ("The plough cuts the furrow, but the sword defends it").
- Dux mea lux ("The Leader is my light"), Latin phrase.
- Duce, a noi ("Duce, to us").
- Mussolini ha sempre ragione ("Mussolini is always right").
- Vincere, e vinceremo ("To win, and we shall win!").
- O con noi, o contro di noi ("You're either with us or against us").

== Italian anti-fascism ==
=== During Benito Mussolini's dictatorship ===
Flag of Arditi del Popolo, an axe cutting a fasces. Arditi del Popolo was a militant anti-fascist group founded in 1921 in Italy.

In Italy, Mussolini's fascist regime used the term anti-fascist to describe its opponents. Mussolini's secret police was officially known as the Organization for Vigilance and Repression of Anti-Fascism. During the 1920s in the Kingdom of Italy, anti-fascists, many of them from the labor movement, fought against the violent Blackshirts and against the rise of the fascist leader Benito Mussolini. After the Italian Socialist Party (PSI) signed a pacification pact with Mussolini and his Fasces of Combat on 3 August 1921, and trade unions adopted a legalist and pacified strategy, members of the workers' movement who disagreed with this strategy formed Arditi del Popolo.

The Italian General Confederation of Labour (CGL) and the PSI refused to officially recognize the anti-fascist militia and maintained a non-violent, legalist strategy, while the Communist Party of Italy (PCd'I) ordered its members to quit the organization. The PCd'I organized some militant groups, but their actions were relatively minor. The Italian anarchist Severino Di Giovanni, who exiled himself to Argentina following the 1922 March on Rome, organized several bombings against the Italian fascist community. The Italian liberal anti-fascist Benedetto Croce wrote his Manifesto of the Anti-Fascist Intellectuals, which was published in 1925. Other notable Italian liberal anti-fascists around that time were Piero Gobetti and Carlo Rosselli.

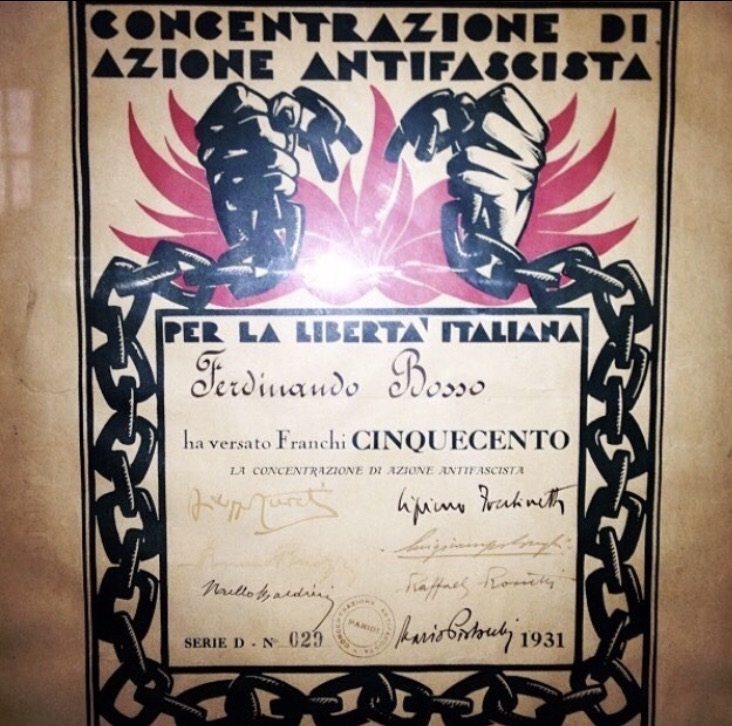
1931 badge of a member of Concentrazione Antifascista Italiana

Concentrazione Antifascista Italiana (English: Italian Anti-Fascist Concentration), officially known as Concentrazione d'Azione Antifascista (Anti-Fascist Action Concentration), was an Italian coalition of Anti-Fascist groups which existed from 1927 to 1934. Founded in Nérac, France, by expatriate Italians, the CAI was an alliance of non-communist anti-fascist forces (republican, socialist, nationalist) trying to promote and to coordinate expatriate actions to fight fascism in Italy; they published a propaganda paper entitled La Libertà.

Flag of Giustizia e Libertà, anti-fascist movement active from 1929 to 1945

Giustizia e Libertà (English: Justice and Freedom) was an early underground organization formed by anti-fascist members of the Italian resistance movement, active from 1929 to 1945. The movement was cofounded by Carlo Rosselli, Ferruccio Parri, who later became Prime Minister of Italy, and Sandro Pertini, who became President of Italy, were among the movement's leaders. The movement's members held various political beliefs but shared a belief in active, effective opposition to fascism, compared to the older Italian anti-fascist parties. Giustizia e Libertà also made the international community aware of the realities of fascism in Italy, thanks to the work of Gaetano Salvemini.

Many Italian anti-fascists participated in the Spanish Civil War with the hope of setting an example of armed resistance to Francisco Franco's dictatorship in Spain against Mussolini's regime in Italy; hence their motto: "Today in Spain, tomorrow in Italy".

Between 1920 and 1943, several anti-fascist movements were active among the Slovenes and Croats in the territories annexed to Italy after World War I, known as the Julian March. The most influential was the militant insurgent organization TIGR, which carried out numerous sabotages, as well as attacks on representatives of the Fascist Party and the military. Most of the underground structure of the organization was discovered and dismantled by the Organization for Vigilance and Repression of Anti-Fascism (OVRA) in 1940 and 1941, and after June 1941 most of its former activists joined the Slovene Partisans.

During World War II, many members of the Italian resistance left their homes and went to live in the mountains, fighting against Italian fascists and German Nazi soldiers during the Italian Civil War. Many cities in Italy, including Turin, Naples, and Milan, were freed by anti-fascist uprisings.

=== Aftermath of World War II ===
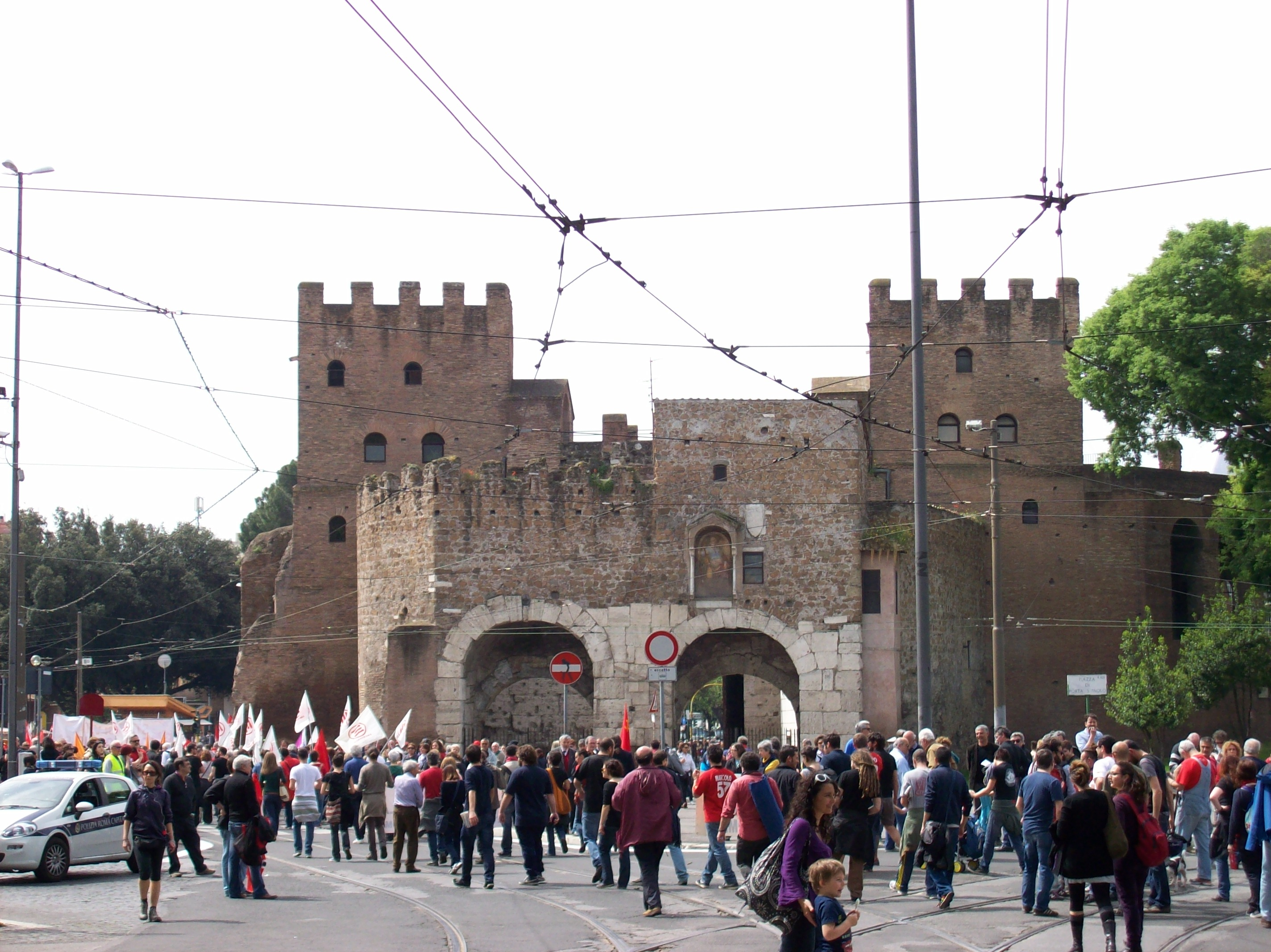
Anti-fascist demonstration at Porta San Paolo in Rome, Italy, on the occasion of the Liberation Day on 25 April 2013

The current Constitution of the Italian Republic was officially ratified and promulgated on 27 December 1947. Following the referendum on the institutional form of the State held by universal suffrage in the Kingdom of Italy on 2 June 1946, which overthrew the monarchy and replaced it with republicanism, the Constituent Assembly of Italy was formed in the same year by the major political representatives and jurists of all the anti-fascist partisan forces that comprised the Western Allied Italian resistance movement, which contributed to the defeat of the Nazi–Fascist regime during the Liberation of Italy (1943–1945). Originally including 139 articles, the Constitution defined the foundational structure of the republican government of Italy, and had been revised by the Constituent Assembly 170 times before its approval. The Constitution came into force in the newly founded Italian Republic on 1 January 1948.

Liberation Day is a national holiday in Italy that commemorates the victory of the Italian resistance movement against Nazi Germany and the Italian Social Republic (RSI), a puppet state of the Nazi Germans and rump state of the Italian fascists that existed during the Italian Civil War, fought during World War II, which takes place on 25 April 1945. The date was chosen by convention, as it was the day of the year 1945 when the National Liberation Committee for Northern Italy (CLNAI) officially proclaimed the anti-fascist insurgency in a radio announcement, propounding the seizure of power by the CLNAI and proclaiming the death sentence for all Italian fascist leaders and collaborators of the Nazi–Fascist regime (including Mussolini himself, who was shot three days later by a group of Italian partisans).

Emblem of the Associazione Nazionale Partigiani d'Italia (ANPI)

The Associazione Nazionale Partigiani d'Italia (ANPI: "National Association of Italian Partisans") is an association founded in Rome in 1944 by participants of the Italian resistance against the Nazi–Fascist regime and the subsequent Nazi occupation of Northern Italy during World War II. ANPI's objectives are the maintenance of the historical role of the Italian partisan groups that fought in the Italian Civil War by means of research and the collection of archives, historical documents, and personal stories. Its goals are a continued defense of anti-fascist republicanism against the historical revisionism of neo-fascists in the Italian Republic, along with the ideal and ethical support of human rights, political freedom, pro-Europeanism, and parliamentarian democracy expressed in the Constitution of the Italian Republic (1948), in which the ideals of the Italian resistance were collected. Since 2008, every two years ANPI organizes its national festival. During the event, meetings, debates, and musical concerts that focus on anti-fascism, peace, and democracy are organized throughout the country.

Bella ciao (instrumental only version performed by the Band of the Guard of the Serbian Armed Forces)

Bella ciao (Italian pronunciation: [ˈbɛlla ˈtʃaːo]; "Goodbye beautiful") is an Italian folk song modified and adopted as an anthem of the Italian resistance movement by the partisans who opposed Nazism and fascism, and fought against the occupying forces of Nazi Germany, who were allied with the fascist and collaborationist Italian Social Republic (RSI) between 1943 and 1945 during the Italian Civil War. Versions of this Italian anti-fascist song continue to be sung worldwide as a hymn of freedom and resistance. As an internationally known hymn of freedom, it was intoned at many historic and revolutionary events. The song originally aligned itself with Italian partisans fighting against Nazi German occupation troops, but has since become to merely stand for the inherent rights of all people to be liberated from tyranny.

== See also ==
- Anti-fascism
  - Post–World War II anti-fascism
- Authoritarian conservatism
- Fascism
  - Clerical fascism
  - Definitions of fascism
  - Economy of Italy under fascism
  - Fascism and ideology
  - Fascist architecture
  - Fascist syndicalism
  - National Fascist Party (PNF)
  - Neo-fascism
  - Republican Fascist Party (PFR)
  - Squadrismo (fascist violence in Italy)
- Far-right terrorism
- History of the far-right in France
- History of the far-right in Spain
- National conservatism
- Propaganda in Fascist Italy
  - Italian fascism and racism
  - Italian racial laws
  - Model of masculinity under fascist Italy
- Racism in Italy
  - Antisemitism in 21st-century Italy
- Totalitarianism

=== Italian fascist states ===
- Kingdom of Italy (1922–1943; as a fascist regime)
- Italian Social Republic (1943–1945)

=== Related ideologies ===
- Austrofascism (ultra-nationalist Austrian fascism in the Federal State of Austria)
- Falangism (ultra-nationalist Spanish fascism in Francoist Spain and Latin America)
- Hindutva (ultra-nationalist Hindu fascism in India)
- Integralismo (para-fascist Brazilian nationalism during the Vargas Era)
- Legionarism (ultra-nationalist Romanian fascism in the Kingdom of Romania)
- Kokkashugi (State-sponsored fascism in the Japanese Empire)
- Nazism (ultra-nationalist German fascism in Nazi Germany)
- Révolution nationale (State-sponsored fascism in Vichy France)
- Ustaše (ultra-nationalist Croatian fascism in the Kingdom of Yugoslavia)

== Sources ==
- Brennan, T. Corey (2022). "Constructing Fasces in Mussolini's Italy". The Fasces: A History of Ancient Rome's Most Dangerous Political Symbol. Oxford and New York: Oxford Academic. pp. 178–197. doi:10.1093/oso/9780197644881.003.0011. ISBN 978-0-19-764488-1.
- Dutt, R. Palme (October 1935). "Chapter V: How Fascism Came In Italy" (PDF). Fascism and Social Revolution (3rd Revised ed.). New York: International Publishers. pp. 111–126. ISBN 9781434405234. Archived (PDF) from the original on 6 March 2026 – via Marxists Internet Archive.
- Falasca-Zamponi, Simonetta (2000). Fascist Spectacle: The Aesthetics of Power in Mussolini's Italy. Oakland, California: University of California Press. ISBN 978-0-520-22677-7.
- Grand Council of Fascism (30 April 1927). "Carta del Lavoro". Gazzetta Ufficiale (in Italian). No. 100. Rome, Kingdom of Italy: Istituto Poligrafico e Zecca dello Stato – via Internet Archive.
- Gregor, A. James (2005). Mussolini's Intellectuals: Fascist Social and Political Thought. Princeton, New Jersey and Woodstock, Oxfordshire: Princeton University Press. doi:10.2307/j.ctt7ss3x. ISBN 978-1-4008-2634-6. LCCN 2004049133.
- Marpicati, Arturo; Mussolini, Benito; Volpe, Gioacchino (1932). "Fascismo". Enciclopedia Italiana (in Italian). Rome, Kingdom of Italy: Enciclopedia Treccani.
- Mussolini, Benito (2006) [1928]. My Autobiography: With "The Political and Social Doctrine of Fascism". Translated by Child, Richard W. Garden City, New York: Dover Publications. ISBN 978-0-486-44777-3.
- Paxton, Robert O. (2004). The Anatomy of Fascism (1st ed.). New York: Alfred A. Knopf. ISBN 978-1-4000-4094-0.
- Sorel, Georges (2004) [1908]. Jennings, Jeremy (ed.). Reflections on Violence (PDF). Cambridge Texts in the History of Political Thought. Cambridge and New York: Cambridge University Press. ISBN 9780511815614. Archived (PDF) from the original on 26 January 2026.
