= Martello =

Martello can refer to:

== People ==
- Alan Martello (born 1952), former Australian rules football player
- Alfonse Martello D'Amato (born 1937), New York politician
- Candice Martello (better known as Hemming), singer-songwriter
- Cesar Martello, politician in Ontario
- Charles Martel of Anjou (1271-1295), titular king of Hungary
- Karen Martello (born 1978), Venezuelan singer and television presenter.
- Leo Martello (1931-2000), pagan
- Tullio Martello (1841-1918), Italian economist
- Wan Ling Martello (born 1958), businesswomen

== Other ==
- Martello tower, a Napoleonic War defensive structure in Britain, Ireland, Canada and other countries
- Martello radar, a type of early-warning radar
- Martello, the Italian name for Martell, South Tyrol
- Martello, the name of a LB&SCR A1 class railway locomotive
