= Carlo Costamagna =

Italian lawyer and academic (1881–1965)

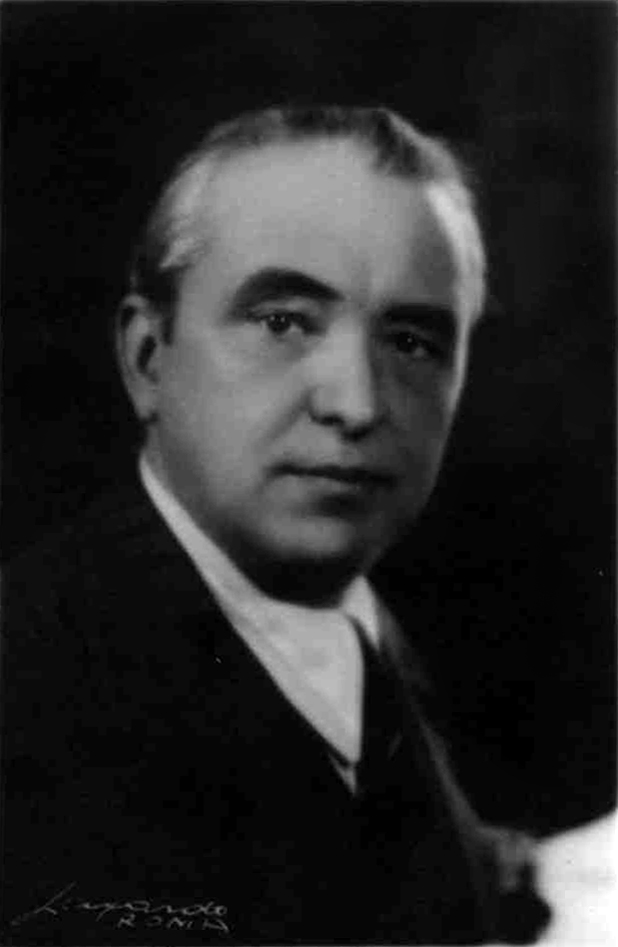
Photographic portrait of Carlo Costamagna

Carlo Costamagna (21 September 1881 – 1 March 1965) was an Italian lawyer and academic noted as a theorist of corporatism. He worked closely with Benito Mussolini and his fascist movement. Costamagna was born in Quiliano, Italy.

== Path to fascism ==
After studying law, Costamagna joined the fascist movement in 1920 and in 1924 was appointed National Secretary of Technical Councils. Politically Costamagna was highly conservative and saw fascism as a transitory phase that existed only for the imposition of corporatism. On this point he had a long-running intellectual debate with Sergio Panunzio who was a strong supporter of the fascist state as an end in itself rather than just a means to economic change. He edited his own journal, Lo Stato, which he founded in 1930.

== Academic career ==
As an academic, he was appointed Professor of Corporate Law at the University of Ferrara in 1927, going on to hold similar posts at the University of Pisa and the University of Rome. His corporatist theories were strongly influenced by the statism of Georg Wilhelm Friedrich Hegel.

== Government work ==
Alongside his role in the academic world, Costamagna was also involved at various levels of politics in Fascist Italy. Between 1926 and 1927 he was involved in drafting a series of laws with fellow legal expert Alfredo Rocco and economist Giuseppe Bottai designed to convert Italy to a fascist state. The concept of the "ethical state" that they developed became the official ideology thereafter. He then moved on to take a leading role in the Ministry of Corporations. He became a member of the Italian Chamber of Deputies in 1929 and served in its successor the Chamber of Fasces and Corporations. He was admitted to the Italian Senate in 1943, by which time he had become part of the circle around the writer Julius Evola.

== Post-war ==
Costamagna did not face prison for his involvement in the fascist government after the Second World War but he was barred from any university involvement as a consequence. He was involved in the formation of the Italian Social Movement and, with his combination of conservative ideals, corporatist econeconomics, Evola-inspired mysticism, became one of the leading exponents of the Italian version of the Conservative Revolutionary movement.
