= Modern history of Italy =

The following articles cover the modern history of Italy:

- Italian unification (1815–1861)
- History of the Kingdom of Italy (1861–1946)
  - Italian Fascism
  - Italian Colonial Empire
- History of the Italian Republic (1945 to present)
  - Years of Lead (Italy) (1969–1988)
  - Berlusconi era (2001 to present)

== See also ==
- Early modern history of Italy
