= Lo Stato =

Italian political and finance magazine (1930-1943)

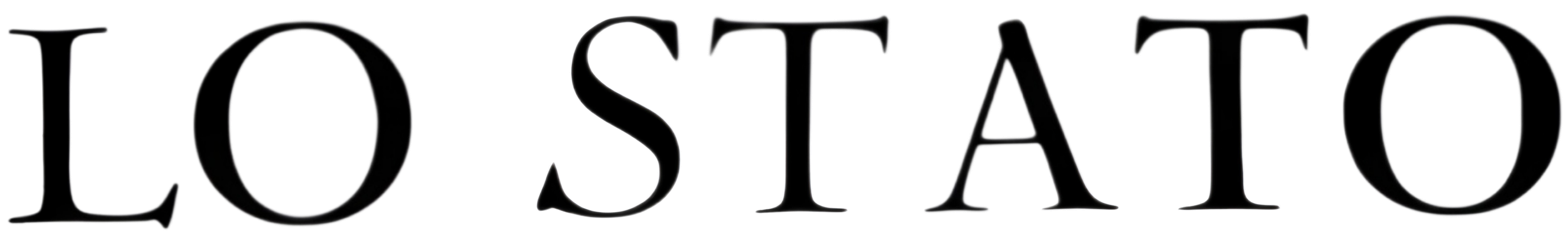
- Categories: Political magazine; Finance Magazine
- Frequency: Bimonthly (1930); Monthly (1931–1943)
- Founder: Ettore Rosboch; Carlo Costamagna
- Founded: 1930
- Final issue: 1943
- Country: Italy
- Based in: Rome
- Language: Italian

Lo Stato (Italian: The State) was a monthly political and finance magazine which existed in the Fascist Italy between 1930 and 1943. Its subtitle was Rivista di scienze politiche e giuridiche.

== History and profile ==
Lo Stato was started in Rome in 1930. Its founders were Ettore Rosboch and Carlo Costamagna. Of them the former was a leading economist. The magazine was published first bimonthly, but from 1931 its frequency was switched to monthly.

Its major contributors were the Italian economists, including Celestino Arena, Gino Arias, Gino Borgatta, Giuseppe Bottai, Gustavo Del Vecchio, Giuseppe Ugo Papi and Franco Modigliani. Lo Stato defined fascism as a dictatorship and totalitarian regime which was superior than both liberalism and communism. Contributors of the magazine, particularly Carl Schmitt, provided a theory of the totalitarian state.

Lo Stato folded in 1943.
