= Gustavo Del Vecchio =

Italian economist, politician, and academic

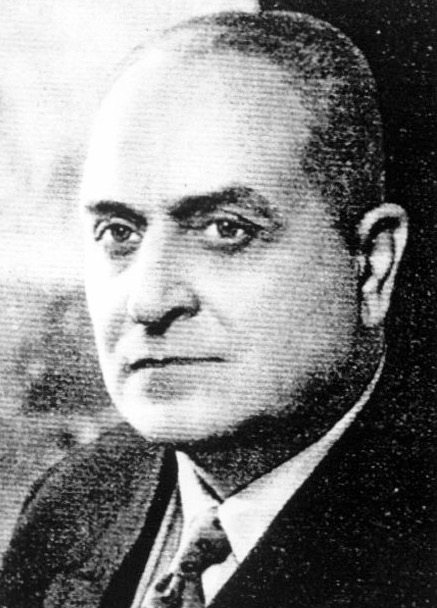

5th Italian Minister of Treasury
- In office 6 June 1947 – 24 May 1948
- Preceded by: Luigi Einaudi
- Succeeded by: Giuseppe Pella

Personal details
- Born: 22 June 1883 Lugo, Emilia-Romagna
- Died: 6 September 1972 (aged 89)

Gustavo Del Vecchio (22 June 1883 – 6 September 1972) was an Italian economist, minister, and academic.

== Early life ==
Gustavo Del Vecchio was born in Lugo on 22 June 1883 in the Kingdom of Italy. His family were members of the Jewish community of Lugo.

On 21 June 1887, when Del Vecchio was three years old, his father, Cesare, was murdered by another employee at his company. His mother, Beatrice Cavalieri, decided to move to Bologna with her children. Gustavo attended school there from primary to high school.

== Career ==
In 1900, he enrolled in the Faculty of Law in Rome's Sapienze University. One of his first teachers was Arturo Labriola, a professor of philosophy and history. The next year, Del Vecchio came back to Bologna where he continued his law studies at the University of Bologna. One of the people he studied with was economist Tullio Martello, who is well known for his participation in the Expedition of the Thousand. In 1904, at 21 years old, Del Vecchio graduated with a thesis on monopolies. He went on to complete his studies in England and the Humboldt University of Berlin.

Del Vecchio served as a volunteer during the First World War. After the war ended, he took up teaching economics at the Higher Institute of Economics and Business in Trieste from 1920 to 1926, moved on to the University of Bologna in 1926 and then at Bocconi University of Milan in 1930.

Gustavo Del Vecchio issued several publications on his research. In 1909, he began working for an academic journal named Giornale degli economisti e Annali di economia. His research on money and credit was published as Ricerche sopra la teoria generale della moneta (1932). He was one of the contributors of the Fascist political and finance magazine Lo Stato from 1930 and served as editors for Econometrica, Economia, Beiträge zur Ökonomischen Theorie, Economia Internazionale, and Rivista bancaria.

Up until 1933, he managed to avoid joining the Italian Fascist Party, which made membership mandatory for Italian professors. In 1934, he became rector for Bocconi University.

On 18 September 1938 the Fascist regime of Benito Mussolini proclaimed the racial laws. Del Vecchio, who was Jewish, was promptly kicked out of his offices. Forced to abandon teaching, he immigrated in 1943 to Switzerland. He remained there until the fall of Italy in 1945 when he returned to his office in Bologna.

After the Second World War, Gustavo Del Vecchio became involved in government decisions, primarily on economic matters. He served as advisor to Meuccio Ruini, a Minister of Reconstruction of Liberated lands under the Parri cabinet (June–December 1945). He opposed the concept of a global wealth tax. In 1947, he assumed title of Minister of the Treasury for De Gasperi's fourth cabinet (31 May 1947 - 23 May 1948). He was the interim Minister of Budget after Luigi Einaudi was elected president. Del Vecchio worked to stabilize the lira and halt inflation, and in August 1947, he became president of the Interministerial Committee on Credit and Savings.

In 1948, he received the chairs of finance and financial law from La Sapienza in Rome, which he occupied until 1958. From 1948 to 1950, he held the post of a governor of the International Monetary Fund, and from 1958, he was a member of the National Council for the Economy and Labour.

Gustavo Del Vecchio died in Rome on 6 September 1972, at the age of 89.

== Notable pupils ==
- Federico Caffè

== Publications ==
- (it) Lineamenti generali della teoria dell'interesse, Rome, Athenaeum, 1915.
- (de) Grundlinien der Geldtheorie, Tübingen, Mohr, 1930.
- (it) Capitale e interesse, Turin, Einaudi, 1956.
- (it) Economia generale, Turin, UTET, 1961.
