= Social class in Italy =

Social classes in Italy are bourgeoisie, white-collar middle class, urban petite bourgeoisie, rural petite bourgeoisie, urban working class and rural working class.

== 1970s Italian social classes according to Labini ==
In his Essay on social classes the Italian economist Paolo Sylos Labini presented the following classification, based on his analysis of income distribution:

- Bourgeoisie (properly so called), composed by big urban and rural landowners; entrepreneurs and managers of stock companies; autonomous professionals;
- Petite bourgeoisie
  - Clerical petite bourgeoisie
  - Relatively autonomous petite bourgeoisie: farmers, artisans (including small professionals), traders;
  - Petite bourgeoisie composed by particular categories, such as militaries and clergymen;
- Working class;
- Lumpenproletariat.

== Contemporary Italian social structure ==
A hierarchy of social class rank in Italy today.

1. Bourgeoisie (10% of the working population) includes high-class entrepreneurs, managers, politicians, self-employed people, highest-ranking celebrities, etc.

2. White-collar middle class (17% of the working population) includes middle class workers not employed in manual work.

3. Urban petite bourgeoisie (14% of the working population), is mainly made up of shopkeepers, small-business entrepreneurs, self-employed artisans etc.

4. Rural petite bourgeoisie (10% of the working population) consists of small entrepreneurs or estate owners who operate in the countryside, mainly in agriculture and forestry.

5. Urban working class (37% of the working population) refers to the people employed in manual work.

6. Rural working class (9% of the working population) consists of people operating in the primary industry, such as farmers, loggers, fishermen etc.
