= Sergio Panunzio =

Italian fascist theoretician

Segio Panunzio

Member of the Chamber of Fasces and Corporations
- In office 23 March 1939 – 2 August 1943

Member of the Chamber of Deputies
- In office 24 May 1924 – 2 March 1939

Personal details
- Born: 20 July 1886 Molfetta, Italy
- Died: 8 October 1944 (aged 58) Rome
- Party: National Fascist Party
- Education: University of Naples Federico II
- Occupation: Theoretician

Sergio Panunzio (20 July 1886 – 8 October 1944) was an Italian theoretician of national syndicalism. In the 1920s, he became a major theoretician of Italian Fascism.

== Early life ==
Sergio Panunzio was born on 20 July 1886 in Molfetta, Italy. He started his political involvement young by associating with syndicalist circles in 1902. He gained two degrees from the University of Naples, in jurisprudence in 1908, and in philosophy in 1911.

== Career ==
Panunzio became the head of the Fascist Faculty of Political Sciences at Perugia University in 1928.

Panunzio said that syndicalism is the historical development of Marxism. He pointed to Georges Sorel and Francesco Saverio Merlino as revising Karl Marx to fit the times and emboldening it. He is said to have spearheaded the revisionism that led many syndicalists through interventionism to corporativism and he ostensibly "gave Mussolini's dictatorship a veneer of revolutionary legitimacy".

Panunzio criticized the Soviet state as a "dictatorship over the proletariat, and not of the proletariat". He is quoted as saying, "Moscow bows before the light radiating from Rome. The Communist International no longer speaks to the spirit; it is dead." He opposed the antisemitic campaign of 1938. A strong supporter of the state for its own sake, he had a long-running academic dispute with the corporatist Carlo Costamagna regarding the role of fascism.

== Death ==
Panunzio died on 8 October 1944.

== Works ==
- La Persistenza del Diritto (Discutendo di Sindacalismo e di Anarchismo) [The Persistence of the Right (A Discussion about Syndicalism and Anarchism)] (Pescara: Casa Editrice Abruzzese, 1909).
- Diritto, forza e violenza; lineamenti di una teoria della violenza. Con prefazione di R. Mondolfo (Bologna, L. Cappelli, 1921)
- Italo Balbo (Milano, Imperia, 1923)
- Stato nazionale e sindacati (Milan: Imperia, 1924)
- Che cos' è il fascismo (Milan: Alpes, 1924) ["What Is Fascism", translated into English and published by Sunny Lou Publishing, ISBN 978-1-955392-79-2, 2025]
- Lo stato fascista (Bologna: Cappelli, 1925)
- Il sentimento dello stato (Rome, Libreria del Littorio, 1929)
- Il diritto sindacale e corporativo (programma, concetto, metodo) (Perugia-Venezia: "La Nuova Italia", 1930)
- Popolo, nazione, stato (esame giuridico) (Firenze, "La Nuova Italia" Editrice, 1933)
- Teoria generale dello stato fascista (Padova, CEDAM, Casa editrice dott. A. Milani, 1937-XV) ["General Theory of the Fascist State", translated into English and published by Sunny Lou Publishing, ISBN 978-1-955392-87-7, 2026]
- I sindacati e l'organizzazione economica dell'impero (Roma, Istituto poligrafico dello stato, Libreria, 1938)
- Sulla natura giuridica dell'impero italiano d'Etiopia (Roma, Istituto poligrafico dello stato, Libreria, 1938)
- L'organizzazione sindacale e l'economia dell'impero (Roma, Istituto poligrafico dello stato, Libreria, 1939)
- La Camera dei fasci e delle corporazioni (Roma, Stabilimento arti grafiche Trinacria, 1939)
- Teoria generale dello stato fascista 2. ed., ampliata ed aggiornata (Padova, CEDAM, Casa editrice dott. A. Milani, 1939)
- Teoria generale dello stato fascista, 2nd ed., enl. (Padua: CEDAM, 1939)
- Spagna nazionalsindacalista (Milano, Bietti, 1942)
- Motivi e metodo della codificazione fascista (Milano, A. Giuffrè, 1943)
