= Giuseppe Ugo Papi =

Italian economist (1893–1989)

Giuseppe Ugo Papi (19 February 1893 – 13 September 1989) was an Italian economist who was born in Capua and died in Rome.

Papi was among the contributors of the Fascist finance magazine Lo Stato from 1930. He was the rector of the University "La Sapienza" of Rome from November 1953 to May 1966. He was also a Knight of the Civil Order of Savoy and a member of the Accademia Nazionale dei Lincei.

Papi's books include:

- External Loans and International Trade in Paper Money regime, Rome, A. Signorelli, 1923.
- Political Economy Lessons Gathered During the Academic Year 1924-1925, Rome, Library of Wisdom, 1925.
- Preliminary Plans for the Post-War Period: Income, Nutrition, Unemployment, Rehabilitation Money, Finance Reconstruction, Economic Plans, Rome,
- International Institute of Agriculture, 1944.
- Theory and Economic Development Policy, edited by GU Papi, Milano, Giuffrè, 1954.
- Theory of Economic Behavior of the State, Milan, Giuffrè, 1956.
- International Economics, Volume 18, the Treaty of the Italian economy, Torino, UTET, 1959.
- Dictionary of Economics, Torino, UTET, 1967.
