= Tullio Martello =

Italian economist (1841–1918)

- Born: 13 March 1841; Vicenza
- Died: 10 February 1918 (aged 76); Bologna
- Occupation: Economist, patriot

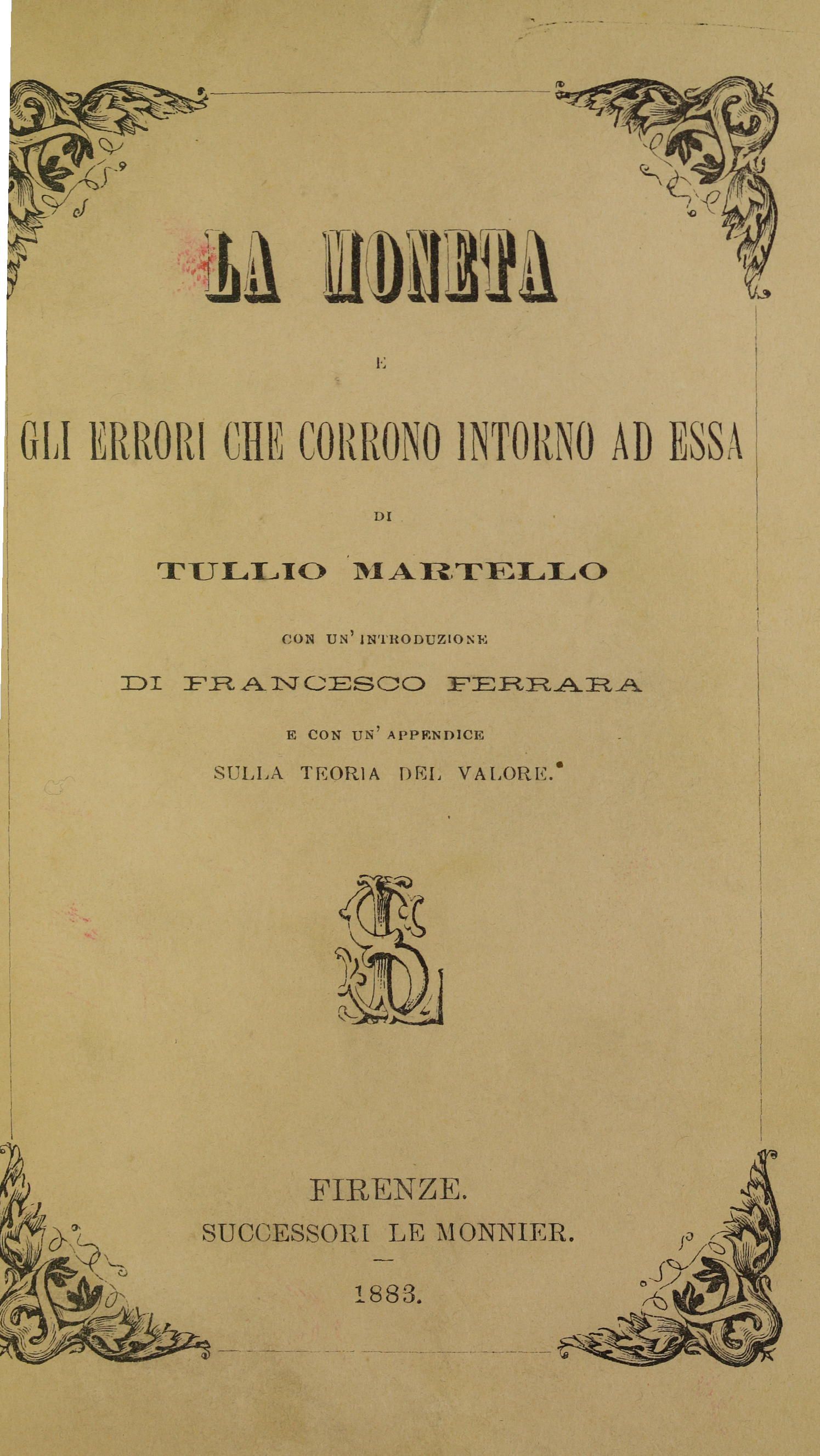
La moneta e gli errori che corrono intorno ad essa, 1883

Tullio Martello (13 March 1841 – 10 February 1918) was an Italian economist.

He took part in the Expedition of the Thousand.

== Works ==
- Storia della Internazionale dalla sua origine al Congresso dell'Aja (in Italian). Padua: Salmin. 1873.
- La moneta e gli errori che corrono intorno ad essa (in Italian). Florence: Successori Le Monnier. 1883.

== Bibliography ==
- Martello, Tullio entry (in Italian) by Tosi, Vincenzo in the Enciclopedia Treccani (1934)
- Gioli, Gabriella (2008). Martello, Tullio (in Italian). Treccani.
