= Benito Mussolini =

Dictator of Italy from 1922 to 1943

Benito Mussolini KSMOM GCTE
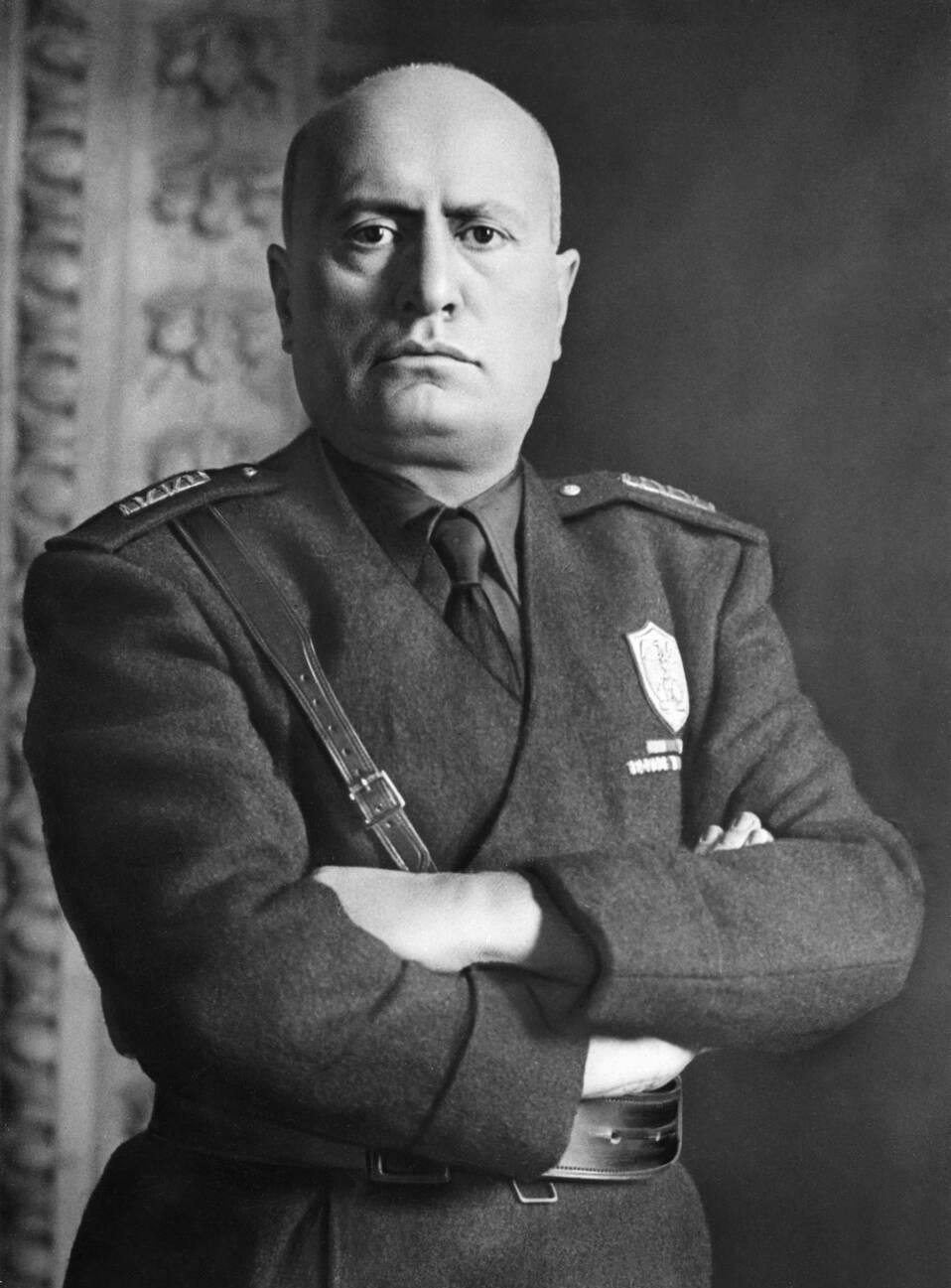
- Mussolini in 1939

Prime Minister of Italy^{[a]}
- In office 31 October 1922 – 25 July 1943
- Monarch: Victor Emmanuel III
- Preceded by: Luigi Facta
- Succeeded by: Pietro Badoglio

Duce of the Italian Social Republic
- In office 23 September 1943 – 25 April 1945
- Preceded by: Office established
- Succeeded by: Office abolished

Duce of Fascism
- In office 23 March 1919 – 28 April 1945
- Preceded by: Movement established
- Succeeded by: Movement abolished
Other positions
Minister of Foreign Affairs
In office 5 February 1943 – 25 July 1943
Prime Minister	Himself
Preceded by	Galeazzo Ciano
Succeeded by	Raffaele Guariglia
In office 20 July 1932 – 9 June 1936
Prime Minister	Himself
Preceded by	Dino Grandi
Succeeded by	Galeazzo Ciano
In office 30 October 1922 – 12 September 1929
Prime Minister	Himself
Preceded by	Carlo Schanzer
Succeeded by	Dino Grandi
Minister of the Colonies
In office 20 November 1937 – 31 October 1939
Prime Minister	Himself
Preceded by	Alessandro Lessona
Succeeded by	Attilio Teruzzi
In office 17 January 1935 – 11 June 1936
Prime Minister	Himself
Preceded by	Emilio De Bono
Succeeded by	Alessandro Lessona
In office 18 December 1928 – 12 September 1929
Prime Minister	Himself
Preceded by	Luigi Federzoni
Succeeded by	Emilio De Bono
Minister of War
In office 22 July 1933 – 25 July 1943
Prime Minister	Himself
Preceded by	Pietro Gazzera
Succeeded by	Antonio Sorice
In office 4 April 1925 – 12 September 1929
Prime Minister	Himself
Preceded by	Antonino Di Giorgio
Succeeded by	Pietro Gazzera
Minister of Corporations
In office 20 July 1932 – 11 June 1936
Prime Minister	Himself
Preceded by	Giuseppe Bottai
Succeeded by	Ferruccio Lantini
Minister of the Interior
In office 6 November 1926 – 25 July 1943
Prime Minister	Himself
Preceded by	Luigi Federzoni
Succeeded by	Bruno Fornaciari
In office 31 October 1922 – 17 June 1924
Prime Minister	Himself
Preceded by	Paolino Taddei
Succeeded by	Luigi Federzoni
Member of the Chamber of Fasces and Corporations
In office 23 March 1939 – 2 August 1943
Member of the Chamber of Deputies
In office 11 June 1921 – 22 March 1939

Personal details
- Born: Benito Amilcare Andrea Mussolini; 29 July 1883 Dovia di Predappio, Forlì-Cesena, Italy
- Died: 28 April 1945 (aged 61) Giulino di Mezzegra, Como, Italy
- Cause of death: Execution by shooting
- Resting place: San Cassiano cemetery, Predappio, Italy
- Party: PNF (1921‍–‍1943)
- Other political affiliations: PSI (1901‍–‍1914); FAR (1914‍–‍1919); FIC (1919‍–‍1921); PFR (1943‍–‍1945)
- Spouses: Ida Dalser (m. 1914; div. 1915) Rachele Guidi (m. 1915)
- Domestic partners: Margherita Sarfatti (1911‍–‍1931); Clara Petacci (1933‍–‍1945)
- Children: Benito Albino; Edda; Vittorio; Bruno; Romano; Anna Maria
- Parents: Alessandro Mussolini; Rosa Maltoni
- Relatives: Mussolini family

Military service
- Allegiance: Kingdom of Italy
- Branch/service: Royal Italian Army
- Years of service: 1915–1917 (active)
- Rank: First Marshal of the Empire; Corporal
- Unit: 11th Bersaglieri Regiment
- Battles/wars: World War I; Second Italo-Senussi War; Second Italo-Ethiopian War; Spanish Civil War; Italian invasion of Albania; World War II (executed)
- a. As Head of Government, Prime Minister, Secretary of State from 24 December 1925

Benito Amilcare Andrea Mussolini (Note: English: UK: /ˌmʊsəˈliːni, ˌmʌs-/ MU(U)SS-ə-LEE-nee, US: /ˌmuːsəˈliːni/ MOO-sə-LEE-nee; Italian: [beˈniːto aˈmilkare anˈdrɛːa mussoˈliːni].) (29 July 1883 – 28 April 1945) was an Italian fascist politician who served as the prime minister of Italy from 1922 until his deposition in 1943, and then as dictator of the Italian Social Republic, a puppet state of Nazi Germany, until 1945. Known as Il Duce during his regime, he established a totalitarian dictatorship led by the National Fascist Party (PNF) in the Kingdom of Italy.

Born in Predappio, Mussolini worked as a journalist for the Italian Socialist Party (PSI) newspaper Avanti!. He was expelled from the party for advocating military intervention in World War I and called up for the Royal Italian Army in 1915, where he served until his discharge after being wounded in 1917. During the war, Mussolini turned to nationalism and denounced the PSI. He founded the Fasci Italiani di Combattimento in 1919, which opposed egalitarianism and class conflict and instead promoted a form of revolutionary nationalism transcending class lines. The Combattimento are often considered the world's first fascist movement.

The Combattimento were reorganised into the PNF in 1921. Fascist militants marched on Rome and Mussolini was appointed prime minister by King Victor Emmanuel III in 1922. He established the OVRA in 1927 to silence opposition, outlawed labour strikes, and consolidated power through the Acerbo Law among others, transforming Italy from a parliamentary democracy into a one-party state. He ordered the Pacification of Libya, characterised by some scholars as a genocide, and signed the Lateran Treaty to formally establish the Vatican City in 1929. Mussolini generally espoused autarkist and corporatist policies to grow the Italian economy, especially after the Great Depression.

Mussolini's foreign policy shifted from cautious pragmatism to expansion and alignment with Nazi Germany in the mid-1930s. He sought to expand Italy's influence without risking a major conflict with France or Britain, aligning with them during tensions over Austria. However, his invasion of Ethiopia resulted in condemnations from the League of Nations, which isolated Italy diplomatically. This pushed Mussolini toward Adolf Hitler, leading to a rapprochement and the formation of the Rome–Berlin Axis in 1936. Mussolini began militarily supporting Francisco Franco's forces during the Spanish Civil War. Although he acted as a mediator at the Munich Conference in 1938, his ambitions for territorial expansion and growing distrust of the Western powers led him to strengthen ties with Germany, resulting in the creation of the Pact of Steel in 1939.

The wars of the 1930s cost Italy enormous resources, leaving it unprepared for World War II; Mussolini declared Italy's non-belligerence. However, in June 1940, believing that German victory was imminent, he joined the war on Germany's side to share the spoils. Following defeats at the hands of the Allies and the landing in Sicily, the Grand Council of Fascism voted on the Grandi motion, which effectively ended Mussolini's leadership and restored powers to King Victor Emmanuel III who then immediately dismissed Mussolini as head of government and placed him in custody in July 1943. After the king agreed to an armistice with the Allies in September 1943, Mussolini was rescued by the Germans during the Gran Sasso raid. Hitler made Mussolini the figurehead of a puppet state in German-occupied north Italy, the Italian Social Republic, which served as a collaborationist regime of Germany. With Allied victory imminent, Mussolini and his mistress Clara Petacci attempted to flee to Switzerland, but were captured by communist partisans and summarily executed on 28 April 1945.

== Early life ==
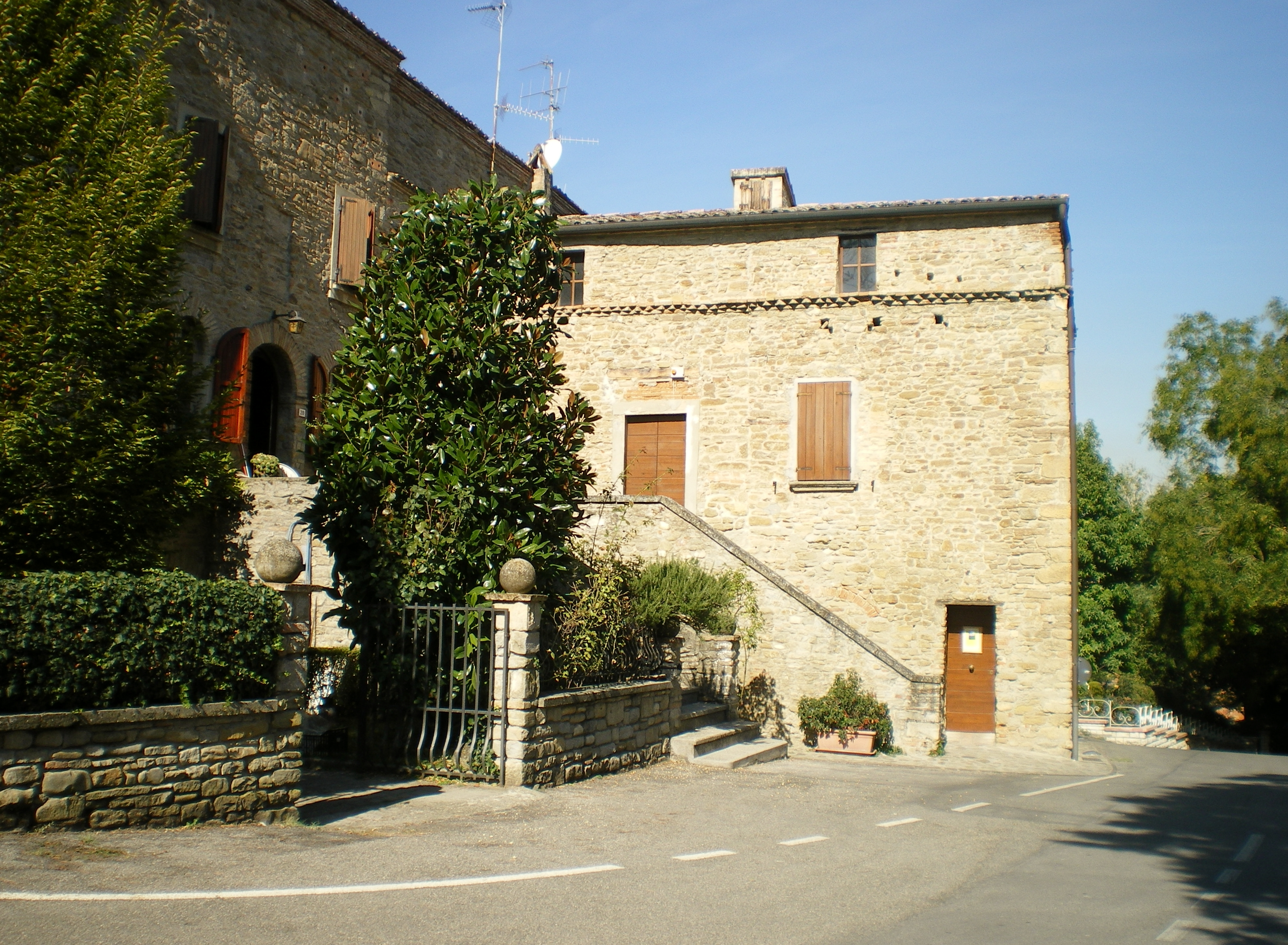
Birthplace of Mussolini in Predappio; the building now hosts exhibitions on contemporary history.

Benito Amilcare Andrea Mussolini was born on 29 July 1883 in Dovia di Predappio, a town in the province of Forlì in Romagna. Mussolini's father, Alessandro Mussolini, was a blacksmith and socialist, while his mother, Rosa (née Maltoni), was a devout Catholic schoolteacher. Reflecting his father's political leanings, Mussolini was named Benito after liberal Mexican president Benito Juárez, while his middle names, were for Italian socialists Amilcare Cipriani and Andrea Costa. In return, his mother required that he be baptised at birth. Benito was followed by his siblings Arnaldo and Edvige. Mussolini's family was of relatively humble status, and fascist biographers emphasized that he had "come from the people". Nevertheless, the family did not belong to the lowest social stratum. Benito's father, despite having his own business, lived on the margins of the community because of his politics, while Rosa, who taught elementary school children at Palazzo Varano, earned a salary insufficient to compensate for her husband's lack of income.

=== Education ===
Mussolini attended the first two years of elementary school in Dovia and then in Predappio (1889–1891). At his mother's request, he entered the Salesian college in Faenza (1892–October 1894), but was transferred after disciplinary problems, including a fight in which he injured a classmate with a knife, resulting in his demotion from the fourth to the second class. In Faenza, Benito experienced an unhappy period marked by corporal punishment from the Salesian friars and frustration over his family's modest social and economic condition.

With his mother's assistance, Mussolini continued his studies at the secular Royal Carducci Male Teacher Training School in Forlimpopoli, directed by Valfredo Carducci, brother of Giosuè Carducci. He earned his lower technical qualification in 1898. Although his academic performance was good, he remained resistant to discipline. He was expelled from the boarding school twice: once after a fight in which he used a penknife, and another time for staying out all night. During his years in Forlimpopoli, and under the influence of his father, Mussolini became involved with militant socialism, speaking at evening rallies in nearby towns. In 1900 he joined the Italian Socialist Party, where he became acquainted with Olindo Vernocchi. On 8 July 1901, he received his diploma as an elementary school teacher from the same institute.

After graduation, Mussolini applied unsuccessfully for teaching posts in several municipalities, including Predappio, Legnano, Tolentino, Ancona, and Castelnuovo Scrivia. In Predappio he also sought a position as an assistant substitute to the municipal secretary, but was rejected by the moderate faction of the council. He eventually began teaching at the elementary school in Pieve Saliceto, a hamlet of Gualtieri and the first Italian municipality governed by a socialist administration. After the school year ended, he left Italy on 9 July 1902 and emigrated to Switzerland to avoid compulsory military service.

=== Emigration to Switzerland and military service ===
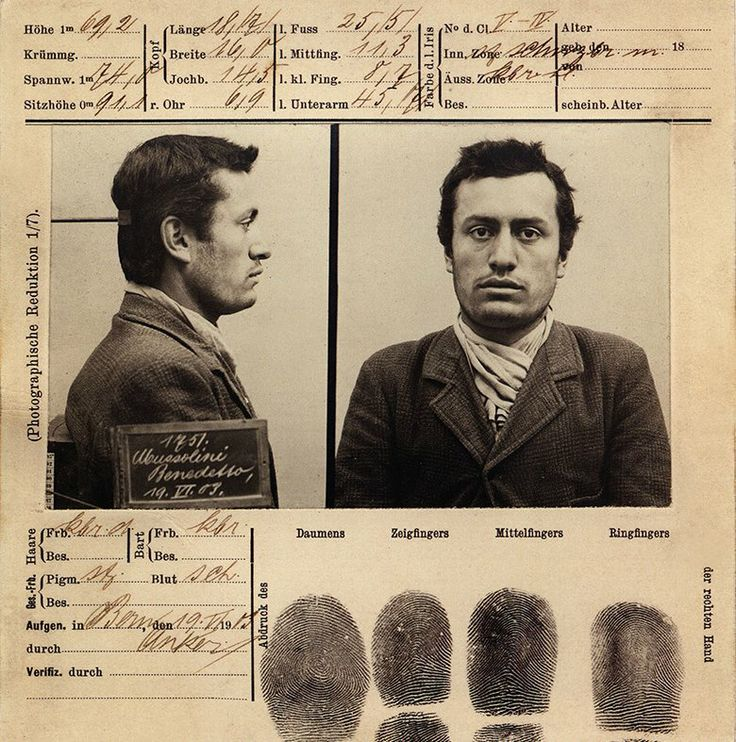
Mussolini's booking file following his arrest by the police on 19 June 1903, Bern, Switzerland

Without work, connections or money, he settled down on 20 July in Lausanne. Living in abject poverty, he was arrested for vagrancy by the police on 24 July under the arches of the Grand-Pont where he spent the night and was kept behind bars for three days.

During this time, he studied the ideas of the philosopher Friedrich Nietzsche, sociologist Vilfredo Pareto, and syndicalist Georges Sorel. Mussolini also later credited Charles Péguy and Hubert Lagardelle as influences. Sorel's emphasis on the need for overthrowing decadent liberal democracy and capitalism by the use of violence, direct action, the general strike, and the use of neo-Machiavellian appeals to emotion, impressed Mussolini.

Mussolini became active in the Italian socialist movement in Switzerland, working for the paper L'Avvenire del Lavoratore (The Future of the Worker), organising meetings, giving speeches to workers, and serving as secretary of the Italian workers' union in Lausanne. John Gunther alleged that Angelica Balabanov introduced Mussolini, then a bricklayer, to Vladimir Lenin. In 1903, he was arrested by Bernese police because of his advocacy of a violent general strike, spent two weeks in jail, and was handed over to Italian police in Chiasso. After he was released in Italy, he returned to Switzerland. He was arrested again in Geneva, in April 1904, for falsifying his passport expiration date, and expelled from the canton of Geneva. He was released in Bellinzona following protests from Genevan socialists. Mussolini then returned to Lausanne, where he entered the University of Lausanne's Department of Social Science on 7 May, attending the lectures of Vilfredo Pareto. In 1937, when he was prime minister of Italy, the University of Lausanne awarded Mussolini an honorary doctorate.

In December 1904, Mussolini returned to Italy to take advantage of an amnesty for desertion from the military. He had been convicted for this in absentia. Since a condition for being pardoned was serving in the army, he joined the corps of the Bersaglieri in Forlì on 30 December 1904. After serving for two years in the military (January 1905 until September 1906), he returned to teaching.

=== Political journalist, intellectual and socialist ===
In February 1909, Mussolini again left Italy, this time to take the job as the secretary of the labour party in the Italian-speaking city of Trento, then part of Austria-Hungary. He also did office work for the local Socialist Party, and edited its newspaper L'Avvenire del Lavoratore (The Future of the Worker). Returning to Italy, he spent time in Milan, and in 1910 returned to his hometown of Forlì, where he edited the weekly Lotta di classe (The Class Struggle).

Mussolini thought of himself as an intellectual and was considered to be well-read. his favourites in European philosophy included Sorel, the Italian Futurist Filippo Tommaso Marinetti, French Socialist Gustave Hervé, Italian anarchist Errico Malatesta, and German philosophers Friedrich Engels and Karl Marx. Mussolini had taught himself French and German and translated excerpts from Nietzsche, Schopenhauer and Kant.

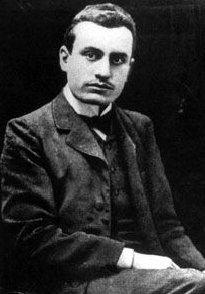
Mussolini in the early 1900s

During this time, he published Il Trentino veduto da un Socialista (Trentino as viewed by a Socialist) in the radical periodical La Voce. He wrote essays about German literature, some stories, and a novel: L'amante del Cardinale: Claudia Particella, romanzo storico (The Cardinal's Mistress). This novel he co-wrote with Santi Corvaja, and it was published as a serial in the Trento newspaper Il Popolo from 20 January to 11 May 1910. The novel was bitterly anticlerical, and years later was withdrawn from circulation after Mussolini made a truce with the Vatican.

He had become one of Italy's most prominent socialists. In September 1911, Mussolini participated in a riot, led by socialists, against the Italian war in Libya. He bitterly denounced Italy's "imperialist war", an action that earned him a five-month jail term. After his release, he helped expel Ivanoe Bonomi and Leonida Bissolati from the Socialist Party, as they were two "revisionists" who had supported the war.

In 1912, he became a member of the National Directorate of the Italian Socialist Party (PSI). He was rewarded with the editorship of the party newspaper Avanti! Under his leadership, its circulation rose from 20,000 to 100,000. John Gunther in 1940 called him "one of the best journalists alive"; Mussolini was a working reporter while preparing for the March on Rome, and wrote for the Hearst News Service until 1935. Mussolini's familiarity with Marxist literature reflected itself in his quoting even from obscure works. During this period Mussolini considered himself an "authoritarian communist" and a Marxist and he described Marx as "the greatest of all theorists of socialism". In 1913, he published Giovanni Hus, il veridico (Jan Hus, true prophet), a historical and political biography about the life and mission of the Czech ecclesiastic reformer Jan Hus and his militant followers, the Hussites. During this socialist period of his life, Mussolini sometimes used the pen name "Vero Eretico" ("sincere heretic"). In June 1914, Mussolini was elected as a city councillor for Milan. While there, Mussolini was one of the council's three representatives on the Commissione Centrale di Beneficenza governing board.

Mussolini rejected egalitarianism, a core doctrine of socialism. He was influenced by Nietzsche's anti-Christian ideas. Mussolini felt that socialism had faltered, in view of the failures of Marxist determinism and social democratic reformism, and believed that Nietzsche's ideas would strengthen socialism. Mussolini's writings came to reflect an abandonment of Marxism and egalitarianism in favour of Nietzsche's übermensch concept and anti-egalitarianism.

=== Expulsion from the Italian Socialist Party ===
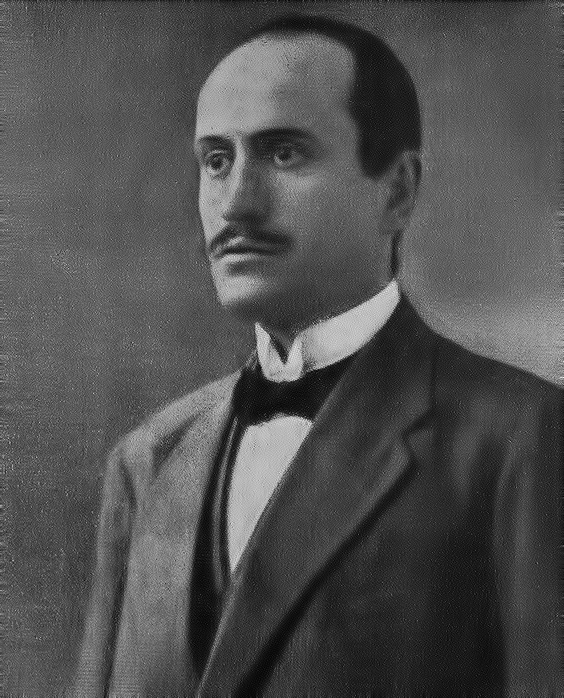
Mussolini as director of Avanti!

When World War I began in August 1914, many socialist parties worldwide followed the rising nationalist current and supported their country's intervention in the war. In Italy, the war created a surge of Italian nationalism and intervention was supported by a variety of political factions. The most popular Italian nationalist supporter of the war was Gabriele d'Annunzio who promoted Italian irredentism and helped sway the Italian public to support intervention. The Italian Liberal Party under the leadership of Paolo Boselli promoted intervention on the side of the Allies and utilised the Società Dante Alighieri to promote Italian nationalism. Italian socialists were divided on whether to support the war. Prior to Mussolini taking a position, several revolutionary syndicalists had announced their support, including Alceste De Ambris, Filippo Corridoni, and Angelo Oliviero Olivetti. The Italian Socialist Party decided to oppose the war after anti-militarist protestors had been killed, resulting in a general strike called Red Week. Mussolini initially held official support for the party's decision and, in an August 1914 article, Mussolini wrote: "Down with the War. We remain neutral."

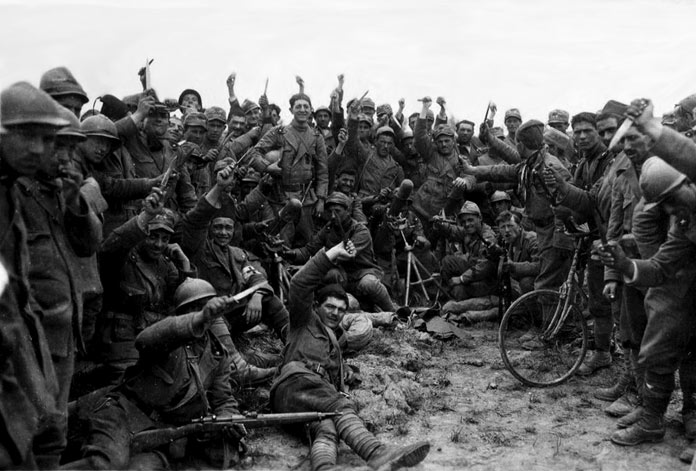
Members of Italy's Arditi corps in 1918 holding daggers, a symbol of their group. The Arditi's black uniform and use of the fez were adopted by Mussolini in the creation of his Fascist movement.

However, he saw the war as an opportunity for his ambitions, as well as those of socialists and Italians. He was influenced by anti-Austrian Italian nationalist sentiments, believing that the war offered Italians in Austria-Hungary the chance to liberate themselves from rule of the Habsburgs. He eventually decided to declare support for the war by appealing to the need for socialists to overthrow the Hohenzollern and Habsburg monarchies in Germany and Austria-Hungary who he said had consistently repressed socialism. Mussolini further justified his position by denouncing the Central Powers for being reactionary powers; for pursuing imperialist designs against Belgium and Serbia as well as historically against Denmark, France, and against Italians, since hundreds of thousands of Italians were under Habsburg rule. He argued that the fall of Hohenzollern and Habsburg monarchies and repression of "reactionary" Turkey would create conditions beneficial for the working class, and that the mobilisation required would undermine Russia's reactionary authoritarianism and bring Russia to social revolution. He said that for Italy the war would complete the process of Risorgimento by uniting the Italians in Austria-Hungary into Italy, and allowing the common people of Italy to be participating members in what would be Italy's first national war. Thus he claimed that the vast social changes that the war could offer meant that it should be supported as a revolutionary war.

As Mussolini's support for the intervention solidified, he came into conflict with socialists who opposed the war. He attacked them and claimed those proletarians who supported pacifism were out of step with the proletarians who had joined the rising interventionist vanguard that was preparing Italy for a revolutionary war. He began to criticise the Italian Socialist Party and socialism itself for having failed to recognise the national problems that had led to the outbreak of the war. He was then accused of moral and political unworthiness and was subsequently expelled from the party. Shortly thereafter, he resigned from the Milan city council and the Commissione Centrale di Beneficenza.

=== Beginning of Fascism and service in World War I ===
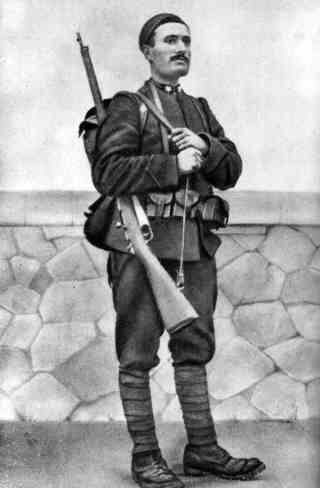
Mussolini as an Italian soldier, 1917

After being ousted from the Italian Socialist Party, Mussolini made a sudden and radical transformation, ending his support for socialism and class conflict, and supporting revolutionary nationalism transcending class lines. He formed the interventionist newspaper Il Popolo d'Italia and the Fascio Rivoluzionario d'Azione Internazionalista ("Revolutionary Fasces of International Action") in October 1914. The funds to create Il Popolo d'Italia—funnelled through entrepreneur Filippo Naldi—came from many sources, including domestic industrial and agrarian interests, such as the engineering giants Fiat and Ansaldo, and the governments of France and Britain. (Note: It is alleged that the governments of Russia, the United States, and Italy itself also funded the paper.)

On 5 December 1914, Mussolini denounced orthodox socialism for failing to recognise that the war had made national identity and loyalty more significant than class distinction. He demonstrated his transformation in a speech that acknowledged the nation as an entity, a notion he had rejected prior to the war, saying:

The nation has not disappeared. We used to believe that the concept was totally without substance. Instead we see the nation arise as a palpitating reality before us! ... Class cannot destroy the nation. Class reveals itself as a collection of interests—but the nation is a history of sentiments, traditions, language, culture, and race. Class can become an integral part of the nation, but the one cannot eclipse the other.

Mussolini continued to promote the need of a revolutionary vanguard elite to lead society. He no longer advocated a proletarian vanguard, but instead a vanguard led by dynamic and revolutionary people of any social class of unity through nationality. Though he denounced orthodox socialism and class conflict, he maintained at the time that he was a nationalist socialist and supporter of the legacy of nationalist socialists in Italy's history, such as Giuseppe Garibaldi, Giuseppe Mazzini, and Carlo Pisacane. As for the Italian Socialist Party and its support of orthodox socialism, he claimed that his failure as a member to revitalise and transform it to recognise contemporary reality revealed the hopelessness of orthodox socialism as outdated. This perception of the failure of orthodox socialism in the light of the outbreak of World War I was not solely held by Mussolini; other pro-interventionist Italian socialists such as Filippo Corridoni and Sergio Panunzio had denounced classical Marxism in favour of intervention.

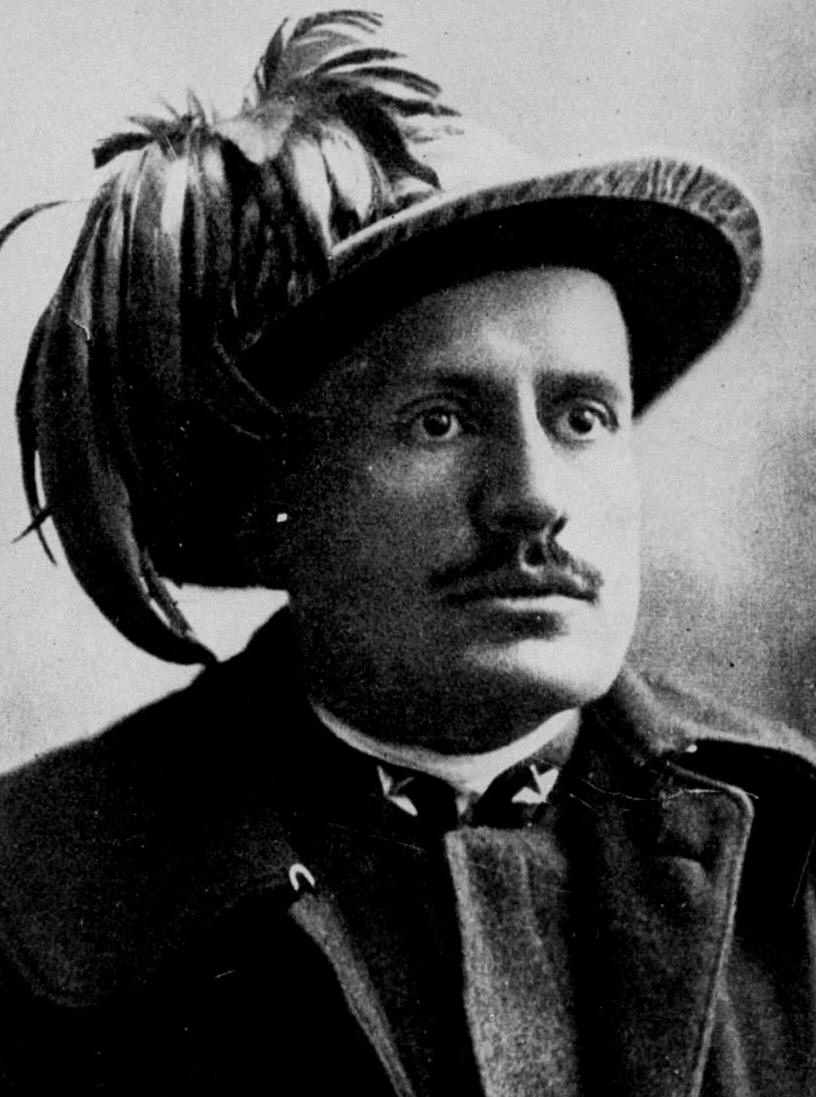
Mussolini as a bersagliere during WWI

These basic political views and principles formed the basis of Mussolini's newly formed political movement, the Fasci d'Azione Rivoluzionaria in 1914, who called themselves Fascisti (Fascists). At this time, the Fascists did not have an integrated set of policies and the movement was small, ineffective in its attempts to hold mass meetings, and regularly harassed by government authorities and orthodox socialists. Antagonism between the interventionists versus the anti-interventionist orthodox socialists resulted in violence between the Fascists and socialists. These early hostilities shaped Mussolini's conception of the nature of Fascism in its support of political violence.

Mussolini became an ally with the irredentist politician and journalist Cesare Battisti. When World War I started, Mussolini, like many Italian nationalists, volunteered to fight. He was turned down because of his radical Socialism and told to wait for his reserve call up. He was called up on 31 August and reported for duty with his old unit, the Bersaglieri. After a refresher course he was sent to the Isonzo front where he took part in the Second Battle of the Isonzo, September 1915. His unit also took part in the Third Battle of the Isonzo, October 1915. On 1 March 1916, Mussolini was promoted to the rank of corporal "for merit in war". The promotion was recommended because of his exemplary conduct and fighting quality, his mental calmness and lack of concern for discomfort, his zeal and regularity in carrying out his assignments.

Mussolini's military experience is told in his work Diario di guerra. He totalled about nine months of active, front-line trench warfare, during which he contracted paratyphoid fever. His military exploits ended in February 1917 when he was wounded by the explosion of a mortar bomb during an exercise on the Karst Plateau near Lake Doberdò. He was left with 40 shards of metal in his body and had to be evacuated. He was invalided out of the army in June 1917 and resumed his editor-in-chief position at Il Popolo d'Italia. At this time he was provided each week with 100£ from British MI5 for providing support of Italian participation in the War.

On 25 December 1915, in Treviglio, he married his compatriot Rachele Guidi, who had already borne him a daughter, Edda, at Forlì in 1910. In 1915, he had a son with Ida Dalser, a woman born in Sopramonte, a village near Trento. He legally recognised this son on 11 January 1916.

== Rise to power ==
=== Formation of the National Fascist Party ===
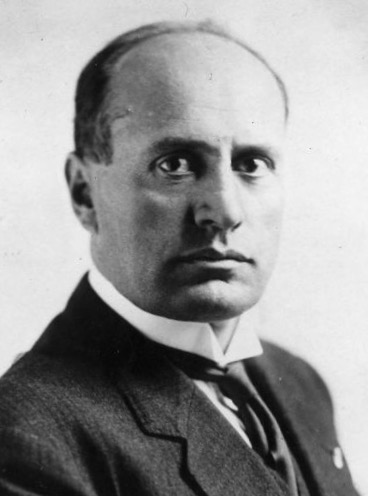
Mussolini in the 1920s

Mussolini returned to politics following his return from service in the Allied forces of World War I. In early 1918 he called for the emergence of a man "ruthless and energetic enough to make a clean sweep" to revive the Italian nation. In December 1918, he published the article "Trincerocrazia" in his newspaper, Il Popolo d'Italia, in which he claimed for the veterans of the trenches the right to govern post-war Italy and envisioned the fighters of World War I as the aristocracy of tomorrow and the central nucleus of a new ruling class. On 23 March 1919, Mussolini founded the Fasci Italiani di Combattimento (Italian Combat Squad) during a meeting in the San Sepolcro Square in Milan, initially consisting of 200 members. With this, he managed to consolidate control over this small emerging fascist movement, known as Sansepolcrismo.

Most Fascisti were young men from Milan or northern Italy, from the urban lower middle class, along with socialists who had broken with their party, anarchists, revolutionary syndicalists, and disgruntled demobilized war veterans especially from the Arditi. Mussolini outlined the new movement's program in the Fascist Manifesto, including a decentralized republic, universal suffrage (including women's suffrage), abolition of the Senate and nobility, compulsory military service, capital tax, confiscation of Church property, the eight-hour day, and nationalization of war industries, alongside attacks on socialism. After the meeting, fascist groups formed in about a hundred towns, mostly in northern Italy, but many were short-lived due to limited support from both workers and the bourgeoisie. By the Florence Congress in October, there were only 56 fasces, with around 17,000 members.

Mussolini had to contend with Gabriele D'Annunzio, who had become a national hero after the Fiume expedition and who was competing with him among the former Arditi and demobilized soldiers. Il Popolo d'Italia organized a major national fundraising campaign that brought in 3 million lire in a few weeks, and Mussolini met with D'Annunzio in Fiume, but only to persuade him not to launch an insurrection whose outcome seemed uncertain, and to wait for the November elections. For these elections, Mussolini wanted to form a bloc of parties and groups claiming to advocate left-wing interventionism: the Italian Republican Party, the Italian Socialist Party, the revolutionary syndicalists of the UIL, Futurists, and Fascists. But this project failed due to opposition from the Republicans, who considered an alliance with a party preaching the subversion of the social order dangerous, and the Fascists ran alone. The result was catastrophic. The Fascist list obtained 4,795 votes and only one seat, the PSI won 170,000 votes and 156 seats, and the Popular Party (Catholic) of Luigi Sturzo won 74,000 votes. After this, Mussolini seriously considered retiring from politics and emigrating. The year 1919 marked the failure of fascism's attempt to establish itself on the left. Only about thirty fasces remained, bringing together a few thousand members.

It was squadrismo, the militarization of fascism during the Biennio Rosso, that enabled Mussolini—whose prospects had seemed minimal in 1920—to rise to power. On 24 and 25 May 1920 Mussolini participated in the Second Congress of the Fasci Italiani di Combattimento, which was held at the Teatro Lirico in Milan, local leaders or Ras (a term Mussolini borrowed from the Ethiopian aristocracy) such as Roberto Farinacci, Dino Grandi, Italo Balbo, and Giuseppe Bottai organized armed squads called blackshirts (or squadristi) that acted as violent, counter-revolutionary militias. Backed by landowners and tolerated by the state, these groups attacked socialist institutions, carried out beatings, arson, and killings, and spread rapidly across Italy. The government of Giovanni Giolitti largely allowed this violence, while fascist membership surged dramatically in 1921. The blackshirts clashed with communists, socialists, and anarchists at parades and demonstrations; all of these factions were also involved in clashes against each other. The Italian government rarely interfered with the blackshirts' actions, owing in part to a looming threat and widespread fear of a communist revolution. The Fascisti grew rapidly; within two years they transformed themselves into the National Fascist Party at a congress in Rome. In 1921, Mussolini won election to the Chamber of Deputies for the first time.

Mussolini sought to channel this movement into political power, entering parliament after the 1921 elections and forming alliances with conservative groups, though his attempts to limit violence—such as the 1921 pacification pact—failed due to opposition from local ras. He then reorganized the movement into the National Fascist Party, creating a more disciplined structure and formal militia. After the failure of the 1922 socialist general strike and growing political instability, Fascism gained momentum; by October 1922, mass support and displays of strength at Naples set the stage for the March on Rome, which brought Mussolini to power.

=== March on Rome ===
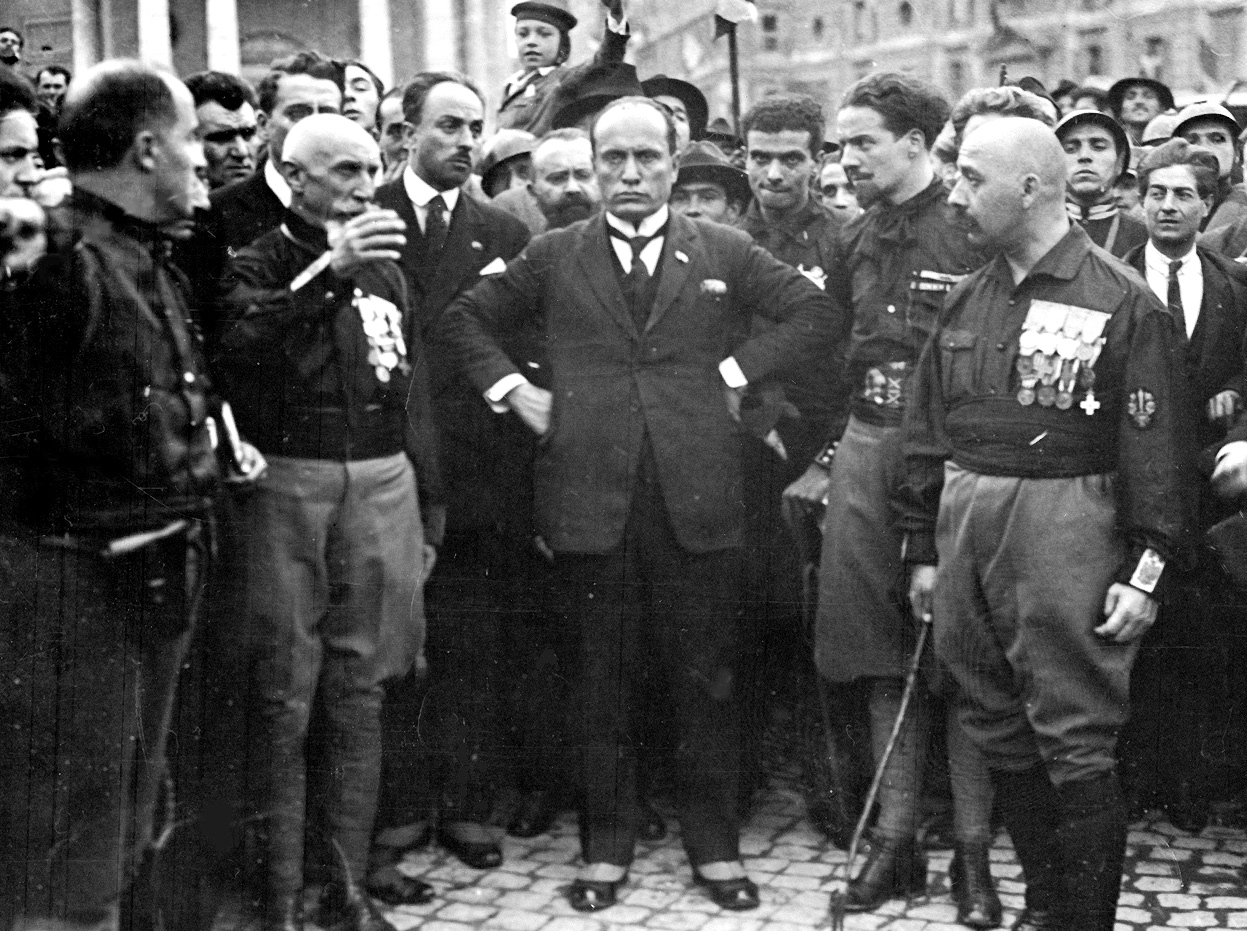
Mussolini and the Quadrumvirs during the March on Rome in 1922: from left to right: Michele Bianchi, Emilio De Bono, Italo Balbo, and Cesare Maria De Vecchi

On 28–31 October 1922, Mussolini attempted a coup d'état, titled the March on Rome by Fascist propaganda, in which almost 30,000 fascists took part. The quadrumvirs leading the Fascist Party, General Emilio De Bono, Italo Balbo (one of the most famous ras), Michele Bianchi and Cesare Maria de Vecchi, organised the March while the Duce stayed behind for most of the march, though he allowed pictures to be taken of him marching along with the Fascist marchers. Generals Gustavo Fara and Sante Ceccherini assisted the preparations of the March of 18 October. Other organisers of the march included the Marquis Dino Perrone Compagni and Ulisse Igliori. On 24 October 1922, Mussolini declared before 60,000 people at the Fascist Congress in Naples: "Our program is simple: we want to rule Italy".

Meanwhile, the Blackshirts, who had occupied the Po plain, took all strategic points of the country. On 26 October, former prime minister Antonio Salandra warned current prime minister Luigi Facta that Mussolini was demanding his resignation and that he was preparing to march on Rome. However, Facta did not believe Salandra and thought that Mussolini would govern quietly at his side. To meet the threat posed by the bands of fascist troops now gathering outside Rome, Facta (who had resigned the next day on 29 October 1922 but continued to hold power) ordered a state of siege for Rome. Having had previous conversations with the king about the repression of fascist violence, he was sure the king would agree. However, King Victor Emmanuel III refused to sign the military order. On 30 October, the King handed power to Mussolini, who was supported by the military, the business class, and the right-wing part of the population. The march itself was composed of fewer than 30,000 men, but the King in part feared a civil war since the squadristi had already taken control of the Po plain and most of the country, while fascism was no longer seen as a threat to the establishment.

Mussolini was asked to form his cabinet on 31 October 1922, while some 25,000 Blackshirts were parading in Rome. Mussolini thus legally reached power in accordance with the Statuto Albertino, the Italian Constitution. The March on Rome was not the conquest of power which fascism later celebrated, but rather the precipitating force behind a transfer of power within the framework of the constitution. This transition was made possible by the surrender of public authorities in the face of fascist intimidation. Many business and financial leaders believed it would be possible to manipulate Mussolini, whose early speeches and policies emphasised free market and laissez-faire economics.

=== Appointment as prime minister ===
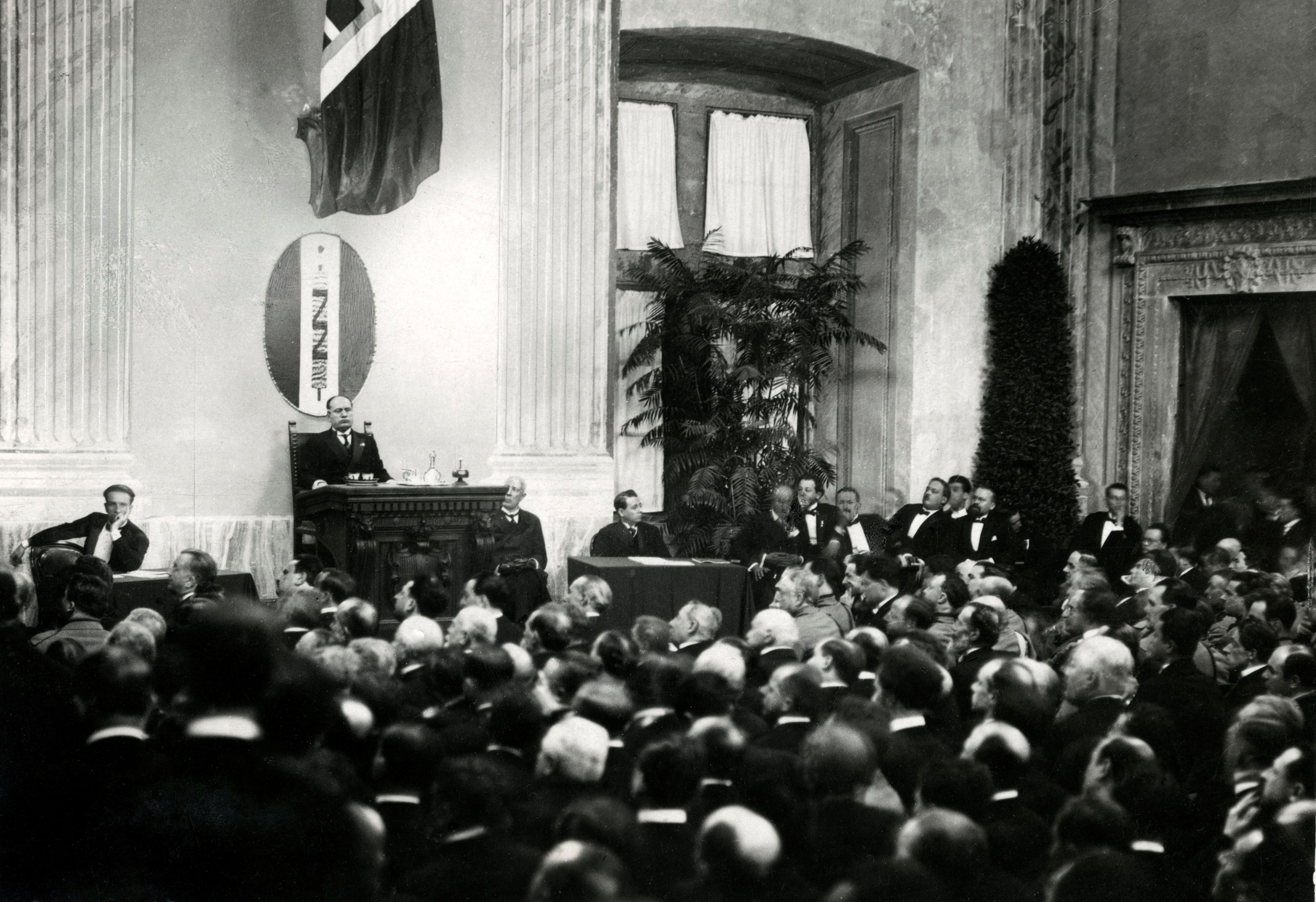
Mussolini speaks to members of the Fascist party, February 1924

Mussolini's first cabinet was a coalition government of the Italian right. Mussolini was the only leading member of the PNF with ministerial rank (Minister of Foreign Affairs and Minister of the Interior); the Fascists Giacomo Acerbo and Aldo Finzi received only state secretary positions. Important ministries went to members of the conservative and nationalist establishment (Giovanni Gentile (Education), Luigi Federzoni (Colonies), Armando Diaz (War), Paolo Thaon di Revel (Navy)). Ministers Alberto De Stefani (Finance), Aldo Oviglio (Justice), and Giovanni Giuriati (Liberated Territories), who came from the same milieu, had already joined the Fascist Party by this time. With Stefano Cavazzoni (Labor and Social Affairs), the right wing of the Italian Popular Party was also represented in the government; in addition, there were representatives of most liberal groups. Overall, it was "a conservative ministry that expressed the common will of industry, the monarchy, and also the Church; it represented an attempt to end the long period of political instability after the war by establishing a stable government that could rely on the broad spectrum of the many factions of the right".

On 16 November 1922, Mussolini appeared before Parliament for the first time as prime minister; threatening to turn the House into "a bivouac for my squadre" at any time, he demanded emergency powers to rule by decree. Only the Socialist and Communist deputies voted against the bills on 24 November, which granted the government special powers until 31 December 1923. Seven liberal deputies, including Nitti and Giovanni Amendola, abstained from the vote; five former liberal prime ministers—Giolitti, Salandra, Orlando, Bonomi, and Facta—voted in favor of the government. In the Senate, the majority in favor of the government was even greater.

In the winter of 1922–1923, particularly in the cities, the Squadrists carried out serious attacks on political opponents. In Turin, an out-of-control "fascist firing squad" systematically murdered socialists, communists, and trade unionists without the police—who were directly under Mussolini's command as Minister of the Interior—intervening. Instead, thousands of fascists benefited from an amnesty before the end of the year. The transformation of the squadre into a national militia called the Voluntary Militia for National Security (MSVN), initiated in February 1923, in whose ranks numerous squadrists disillusioned by the "fascist revolution" received "status, pay, and some local power", was presented by Mussolini to the public as a measure against fascist "illegalism". In the same month, Mussolini established the Grand Council of Fascism, whose relationship to the constitutional institutions was not initially defined in detail, as a forum for the fascist Ras who had not been considered in the formation of the government. This council was connected to the state executive only through Mussolini himself.

During 1923, the Fascist Party merged with other factions of the Italian right. The merger with the Italian Nationalist Association (ANI), orchestrated by Mussolini in March, became a "watershed for Fascism". The ANI brought with it numerous "respectable" and influential figures who were well connected in the military, the court, the bureaucracy, the diplomatic service, and the economy. Alfredo Rocco, in particular, played a crucial role in the establishment and ideological foundation of the Fascist regime in the following years. The conservative wing of political Catholicism also joined the PNF in 1923. Luigi Sturzo, the leader of the populari, yielded to pressure from the Vatican in July 1923 and withdrew from the party. In the shadow of this development, Mussolini was largely able to free himself from his relative dependence on the Old Fascists and the ras. The membership of the PNF rose to 783,000 by the end of 1923 due to the influx of numerous "fascists of the last hour" (fascisti dell'ultima ora), after having been below 300,000 in October 1922.

In June 1923, the government passed the Acerbo Law, which transformed Italy into a single national constituency. It also granted a two-thirds majority of the seats in Parliament to the party or group of parties that received at least 25% of the votes. This law applied in the elections of 6 April 1924. The "national alliance", consisting of Fascists, most of the old Liberals and others, won 64% of the vote.

On 31 August 1923, in the shadow of the Ruhr Crisis, Mussolini ordered the shelling and occupation of the Greek island of Corfu in retaliation for the assassination of an Italian general on Greek territory. With this action, the new prime minister wanted to demonstrate that he wanted to pursue a strong foreign policy and obtained, thanks to the League of Nations, the requested reparations in exchange for abandoning the occupied island. In January 1924, Yugoslavia recognized Italy's annexation of Fiume at the Treaty of Rome. From 1925 onward, Mussolini was able to eliminate Yugoslav influence in Albania and bind the country closely to Italy politically and economically (see Treaties of Tirana).

=== Matteotti Crisis ===
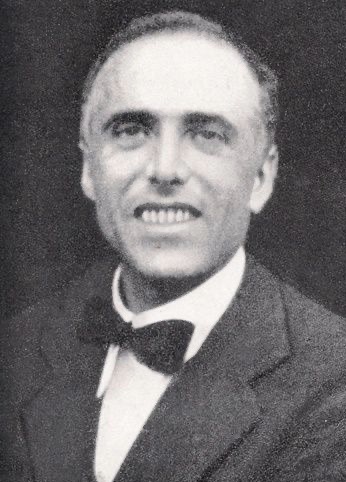
Socialist leader Giacomo Matteotti was assassinated a few days after he openly denounced fascist violence during the 1924 elections.

The assassination of the socialist deputy Giacomo Matteotti on 10 June 1924, who had requested that the elections be annulled because of the irregularities, provoked a momentary crisis in the Mussolini government. Mussolini ordered a cover-up, but witnesses saw the car that transported Matteotti's body parked outside Matteotti's residence, which linked fascist Amerigo Dumini to the murder.

The murder of Matteotti proved to be a political catastrophe for Mussolini, because of his bourgeois origins and his highly moderate socialism, Matteotti, who had been courted by Mussolini until then, was also respected by many liberals. Mussolini was apparently informed of the deed by Dumini on the evening of 10 June, but the following day, before Parliament, he denied any knowledge of Matteotti's whereabouts. Matteotti's body was finally found on 16 August on a road leading out of Rome. Mussolini instructed his staff to create "as much confusion as possible". However, the investigation, based on the identification of the kidnappers' vehicle, led directly to Mussolini's antechamber within a few days. Thus, the anti-fascist opposition was given an unexpected opportunity to deliver a serious and possibly decisive blow to the regime.

All opposition parties then united to agree to abandon Parliamentary proceedings until the government had clarified what had happened to Matteotti in what became known as the Aventine Secession. This was an attempt to give strength to the "moral question" that would point to public disapproval of fascism but also to put pressure on the King to dismiss Mussolini.

However, Victor Emmanuel III refused to act, since the Government was supported by a large majority of the Chamber of Deputies and almost all the Senate of the Kingdom. Moreover, he feared that compelling Mussolini to resign could be considered a coup d'état that eventually could lead to a civil war between the Army and the Blackshirts.

On 31 December 1924, MVSN consuls met with Mussolini and gave him an ultimatum: crush the opposition or they would do so without him. Fearing a revolt by his own militants, Mussolini decided to drop all pretense of democracy. On 3 January 1925, Mussolini made a truculent speech before the Chamber in which he took responsibility for squadristi violence (though he did not mention the assassination of Matteotti).

== Prime minister ==
=== Consolidation of power ===
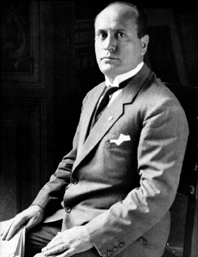
Mussolini in his early years in power

On 3 January, Mussolini and Federzoni instructed the prefects to henceforth suppress political assemblies and demonstrations and to take active action against all organizations "undermining the power of the state". From that day forward, opposition deputies were denied return to the Chamber, which until then had at least been theoretically possible. Press censorship was enforced even more strictly than before following a relevant decree of 10 January 1925; while the press organs of the political left were gradually driven underground, the major liberal newspapers dismissed their few remaining opposition editors during 1925, before a repressive press law came into effect in December 1925. By the end of the year, local autonomy was abolished, and podestàs appointed by the Italian Senate replaced elected mayors and councils.

In 1925, Mussolini began to accept the term "totalitarian", first used by anti-fascist intellectuals in 1923, as an attribute of the regime. In a speech on the third anniversary of the March on Rome, he defined fascism as a system in which "everything [that happens] is done for the state, nothing is outside the state, nothing and no one is against the state". He based this formula on a speech by the Minister of Justice, Alfredo Rocco. The key ideologues of Italian fascism, whose suggestions Mussolini generally followed, were almost exclusively former nationalists such as Rocco and Giovanni Gentile, who were able to maintain their influence in 1925/26 "above all other tendencies within fascism". The "revolutionary" wing of fascism, which was working toward a genuine party dictatorship, was finally ousted by Mussolini in 1926 (the removal of Roberto Farinacci on 30 March 1926) and was only able to maintain a few journalistic positions.

On 7 April 1926, Mussolini survived a first assassination attempt by Violet Gibson. On 31 October 1926, 15-year-old Anteo Zamboni attempted to shoot Mussolini in Bologna. Zamboni was lynched on the spot. Mussolini also survived a failed assassination attempt in Rome by anarchist Gino Lucetti, and a planned attempt by the Italian anarchist Michele Schirru, which ended with Schirru's capture and execution.

All other parties were outlawed following Zamboni's assassination attempt in 1926, though in practice Italy had been a one-party state since 1925. In 1928, an electoral law abolished parliamentary elections. Instead, the Grand Council of Fascism selected a single list of candidates to be approved by plebiscite. If voters rejected the list, the process would simply be repeated until it was approved. The Grand Council had been created five years earlier as a party body but was "constitutionalized" and became the highest constitutional authority in the state. On paper, the Grand Council had the power to recommend Mussolini's removal from office, and was thus theoretically the only check on his power. However, only Mussolini could summon the Grand Council and determine its agenda.

The propagandistic glorification of Mussolini also accompanied the party's transformation from 1926 onward. Arnaldo Mussolini, editor-in-chief of Popolo d'Italia, and the fascist journalist and politician Giuseppe Bottai set the tone for this transformation. "Mussolini is always right" (Mussolini ha sempre ragione.) became a common phrase, and himself soon became a "legendary figure" whose superhuman qualities—not only as a statesman, but also as "aviator, fencer, horseman, Italy's first sportsman"—were introduced to Italians as early as school. Millions of photographs of Mussolini, showing him in one of his characteristic poses (often bare-chested while swimming or harvesting), were disseminated in Italy, where many people were already accustomed to collecting images of saints. On 3 April 1927, the Opera Nazionale Balilla (ONB) was founded, with the task of "reorganizing youth from a moral and physical standpoint", that is, the spiritual and cultural education and the pre-military, gymnastic-sporting, professional, and technical training of young Italians between the ages of 8 and 18. In 1927, all other youth organizations were dissolved by law, with the exception of the Gioventù Italiana Cattolica (Catholic Italian Youth).

In accordance with the new electoral law, the general elections took the form of a plebiscite in which voters were presented with a single PNF-dominated list. According to official figures, the list was approved by 98.43% of voters.

A policy of confiscating land from the Libyans and granting it to Italian colonists gave new vigor to Libyan resistance led by Omar Mukhtar. On November 1929, Mussolini ordered the Pacification of Libya. Well over half the population of Cyrenaica were confined to 15 concentration camps while the Royal Italian Air Force staged chemical warfare attacks against the Bedouin. Angelo Del Boca estimated between 40,000 and 70,000 Libyan died due to forced deportations, starvation and disease inside the concentration camps, and hanging and executions.

In 1929, a concordat with the Vatican was signed, ending decades of struggle between the Italian state and the papacy that dated back to the 1870 takeover of the Papal States by the House of Savoy during the unification of Italy. The Lateran Treaty, by which the Italian state was at last recognised by the Catholic Church, and through which the independence of Vatican City was recognised by the Italian state, was so much appreciated by the ecclesiastical hierarchy that Pope Pius XI acclaimed Mussolini as "the Man of Providence". The 1929 treaty included a legal provision whereby the Italian government would protect the honour and dignity of the Pope by prosecuting offenders. Mussolini had had his children baptised in 1923 and himself re-baptised by a Catholic priest in 1927. After 1929, Mussolini, with his anti-communist doctrines, convinced many Catholics to actively support him.

Towards the end of 1929, Mussolini left the Palazzo Chigi, the traditional seat of the prime minister, for the Palazzo Venezia, located in the heart of Rome and overlooking a square ideal for large gatherings, where he could address the crowds from the palace balcony. He set up his office in the immense Hall of the World Map, furnished only with his 4-meter-long desk and two Savonarola armchairs for visitors. His personal residence was the Villa Torlonia, made available to him for a nominal rent by Prince Alessandro Torlonia. His wife, Rachele Mussolini, built an oven to bake bread, making the dough herself, grew her own vegetables, and raised poultry and a pig, while her husband added a tennis court, a riding arena, stables for his horses, and a cinema.

=== Economic policy ===
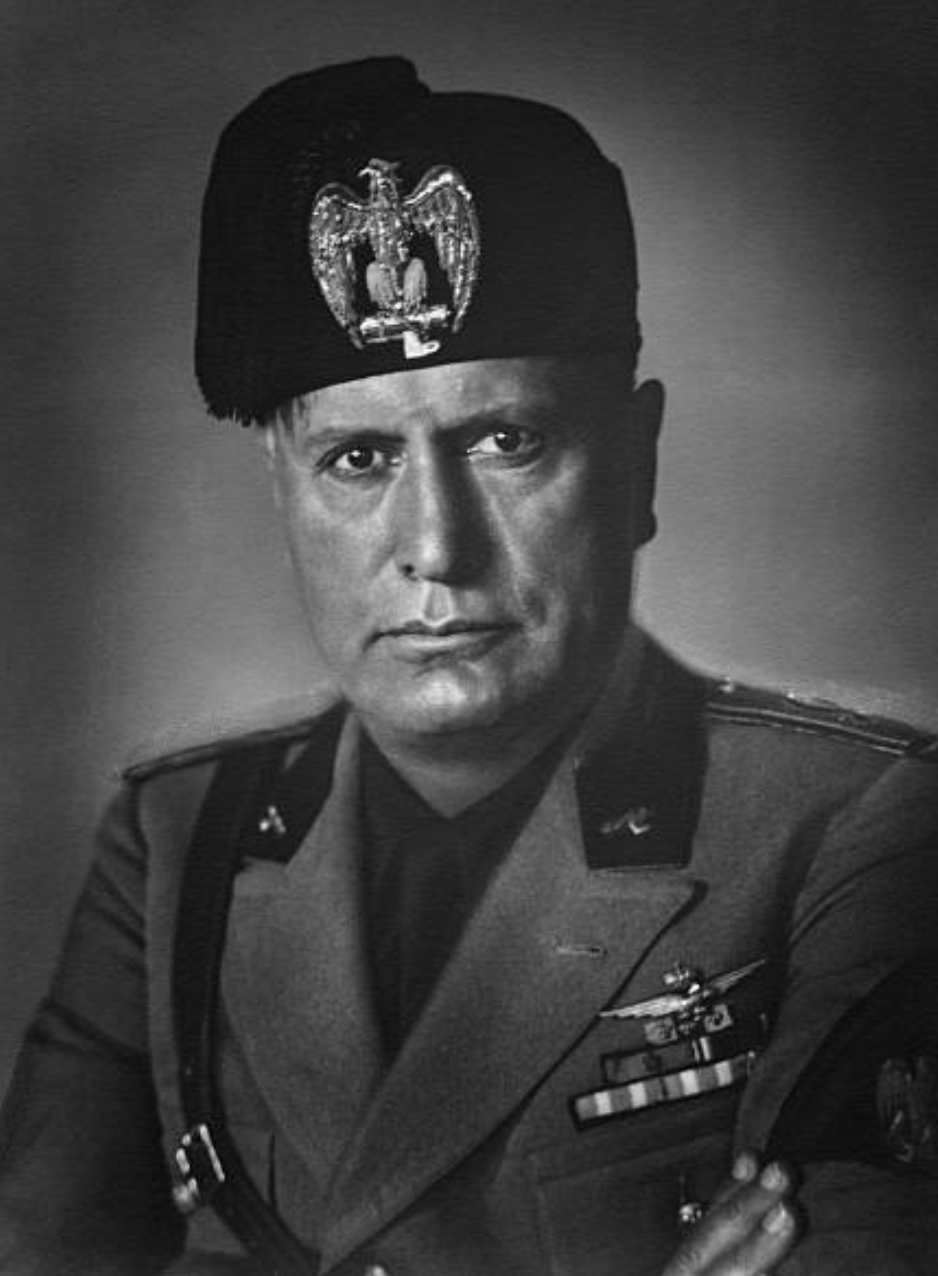
Portrait of Mussolini in 1930

On 24 October 1929, also known as the "Black Thursday", the world economy was hit by the collapse of the New York Stock Exchange. The Great Depression caused an increase in unemployment, especially in the agricultural sector. One year after the beginning of the crisis, the number of unemployed rose from 304,000 in 1929 to 1,070,000 in 1930, reaching 1,200,000 in 1933. Faced with the deepening economic crisis, the Italian government intervened directly in the banking and industrial sectors. In the summer of 1930, Credito Italiano reached an agreement with the state to transfer its industrial holdings to the Società Finanziaria Italiana (SFI) and the Società Elettrofinanziaria. These operations were financed through the Istituto di Liquidazioni, which drew on liquidity from the Bank of Italy. During this period, the Fascist unions obtained some concessions from the government: the stipulation of new national contracts, the introduction of family allowances, paid holidays, severance pay, and the establishment of company health funds. Furthermore, in large factories the union representatives chosen by the workers reappeared.

On 24 October 1931, Mussolini decided to open up the National Fascist Party (PNF) to mass membership. A few months later, on 6 December, the secretary Giovanni Giuriati resigned and was immediately replaced by Achille Starace, who was chosen by Mussolini for his absolute loyalty and obedience, with the aim of transforming the party into an effective instrument of personal propaganda. The liberalisation of membership was followed on 17 December 1932 by the introduction of the obligation to be a member of the PNF in order to be admitted to public competitions, which led to a significant increase in membership: from around 1,000,000 in 1932 it rose to 1,400,000 in October 1933.

To further extend the influence of the PNF on the masses, in 1931, the Ente Opere Assistenziali (EOA) was established, tasked with distributing food and basic necessities to families most affected by the economic crisis. At the same time, the Mussolini promoted initiatives aimed at increasing the popularity of the regime, such improving railroads to encourage middle-class tourism and multiple recreational activities at low cost. The PNF also became a mass organisation that based its action on faith to Mussolini, military discipline, and the mystique of the "Fascist revolution", propagated by the School of Fascist Mysticism. The consolidation of the regime was confirmed in the 1934 Italian general election, where there was a turnout of 96.5% and the list of candidates was approved with 99.8% of the votes in favor. These would be the last elections of any sort held under Fascist rule.

As the economic crisis intensified, Mussolini carried out a major cabinet reshuffle on 20 July 1932, replacing Finance Minister Antonio Mosconi with Guido Jung, who had been president of Sofindit. Shortly afterward, on 23 January 1933, the government established the Istituto per la Ricostruzione Industriale (IRI). Originally conceived as a temporary body, the IRI was designed to sever the close ties between major banks and major industries, stabilize the financial system, strengthen medium- and long-term lending, and channel savings into investments guaranteed by the state. The IRI was divided into two sections: a "Financing" division, responsible for granting loans to businesses, and a "Mobilizing" division, which managed the industrial shares held by struggling banks and by the Istituto di Liquidazioni. Alberto Beneduce was appointed president of the IRI, even though he was not a member of the Fascist Party. In 1934, the IRI assumed control of Italy's three major banks; Credito Italiano, Banco di Roma, and Banca Commerciale Italiana. By that year, the IRI controlled 21.5 percent of Italian joint-stock companies. It managed 100 percent of the war and coal industries, 90 percent of shipbuilding, 80 percent of locomotive production and shipping companies, 66 percent of the electrical industry, and 40 percent of the steel industry.

Government control of business was part of Mussolini's policy planning. In "The Doctrine of Fascism" he wrote: "The so-called crisis can only be settled by State action and within the orbit of the State." He tried to combat economic recession by introducing a "Gold for the Fatherland" initiative, encouraging the public to voluntarily donate gold jewellery to government officials in exchange for steel wristbands bearing the words "Gold for the Fatherland". The collected gold was melted down and turned into gold bars, which were then distributed to the national banks. By 1935, he claimed that three-quarters of Italian businesses were under state control. Later that year, Mussolini issued several edicts to further control the economy, e.g. forcing banks, businesses, and private citizens to surrender all foreign-issued stock and bond holdings to the Bank of Italy. In 1936, he imposed price controls.

=== Foreign policy ===
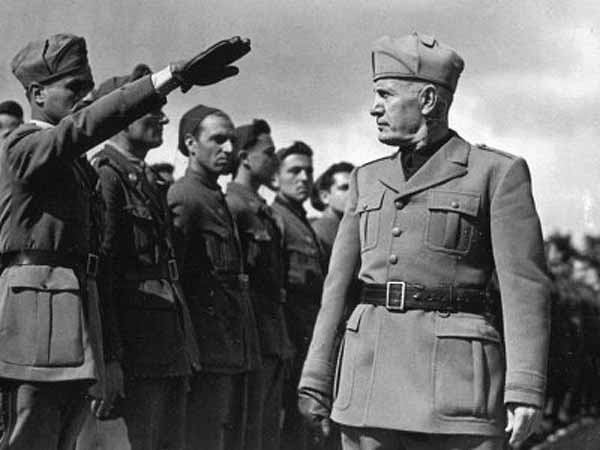
Mussolini inspecting troops during the Second Italo-Ethiopian War

Initially, Mussolini operated as a pragmatic statesman, seeking advantages without risking war with Britain and France. Adolf Hitler's visit to Venice was followed by a dramatic deterioration in German-Italian relations. During the July Putsch of 1934, Chancellor Engelbert Dollfuss, who was supported by Mussolini, was assassinated by Austrian Nazis. Dollfuss's family was vacationing with Mussolini in Riccione at the time, so Mussolini personally delivered the news of her husband's death to Dollfuss's wife. On 21 August, Mussolini met with Dollfuss's successor, Kurt Schuschnigg. The Anschluss crisis of 1934 initially led to a further rapprochement between Italy, France, and Great Britain. In October 1934, Robert Vansittart, 1st Baron Vansittart, the highest-ranking official in the British Foreign Office, traveled to Rome and assured Mussolini of Great Britain's support on the Austrian question. In January 1935, Mussolini and the new French foreign minister, Pierre Laval, signed a series of agreements (the so-called Laval-Mussolini Pact) that provided for consultations on all issues concerning Austria and Germany, as well as the commencement of general staff meetings, promoting the Stresa Front against Germany on April 1935.

In December 1934, clashes between Italian and Ethiopian forces at the oasis of Walwal in the Ogaden resulted in heavy casualties. Mussolini demanded an apology and compensation, while Emperor Haile Selassie appealed to the League of Nations. Although arbitration began, tensions escalated as Italy used the incident to justify aggressive policies. Italy's ambitions to unite Eritrea and Somalia and Ethiopia's desire for sea access fueled the conflict. Diplomatic efforts continued: in January 1935 Italy gained French support through agreements with its foreign minister Laval, while Britain grew increasingly hostile. Despite League mediation, Mussolini prepared for war and publicly asserted Italy's colonial rights.

On 2 October 1935, Mussolini announced a declaration of war on Ethiopia from the balcony of the Palazzo Venezia. The League condemned Italy and imposed economic sanctions, though these were inconsistently applied and ultimately ineffective. He viewed the sanctions as hypocritical attempts by older imperial powers to block Italy's expansion. Italy was criticized for its use of mustard gas and brutal tactics against Ethiopian forces. From the very beginning of the fighting, on 3 October, Mussolini took over the direction of the operations and sent frequent radio orders to his generals engaged in the field (Rodolfo Graziani on the Southern front, Emilio De Bono and then Pietro Badoglio on the Northern front), dictating lines and operational orders to them, including those relating to the use of chemical weapons, on whose use he had taken all decisions for himself. Mussolini ordered systematic terror against the Ethiopians, targeting both combatants and civilians.

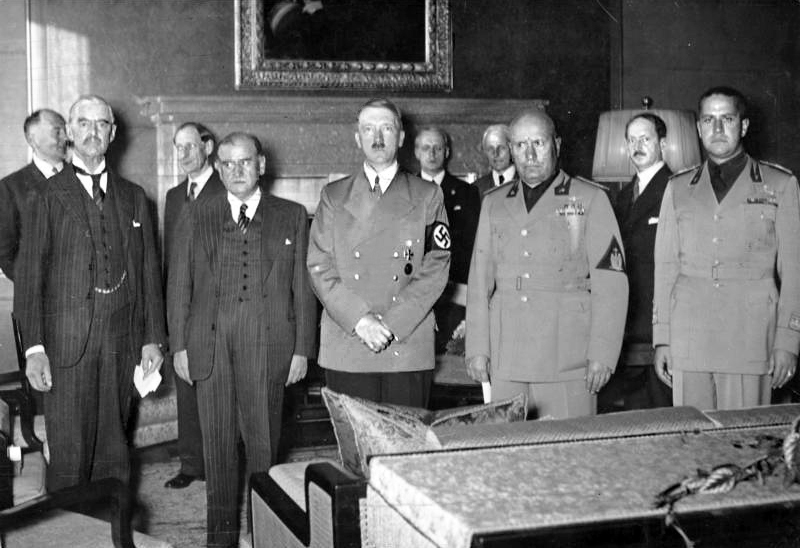
The signing of the Munich Agreement, 1938. From right to left, Galeazzo Ciano (Italian Foreign Minister), Benito Mussolini, Adolf Hitler, Édouard Daladier, and Neville Chamberlain.

After Italians troops entered Addis Ababa, Mussolini announced the end of the Ethiopian War and proclaimed the birth of the Italian Empire from the balcony of Palazzo Venezia. In his speech, he proclaimed: "The Italian people created the empire with their blood. They will fertilize it with their labor and defend it against all with their weapons." Mussolini received the Grand Cross of the Military Order of Savoy from King Victor Emmanuel III, the kingdom's highest military decoration. The king emphatically recognized Mussolini's direct leadership role: "As Minister of the Armed Forces, he prepared, led, and won the greatest colonial war in history." Mussolini was at the height of his popularity in May 1936 with the proclamation of the Italian empire. His biographer, Renzo De Felice, called the invasion of Ethiopia "Mussolini's masterpiece" as it made his regime widely popular with the Italian public.

The conquest of Ethiopia placed a severe financial burden on Italy. The war in Ethiopia was conducted by Italy with an "open" budget, without regard for the growing costs, which quickly became unsustainable, expenses of the Ministry of War grew out of all proportion: between the budget and the final accounts of 1935–36 there was an increase of 201%, in 1936–37 of 309% and in the same year there was an increase of 276% for the Air Force. A few months after the proclamation of the empire, the Minister of Trade and Currencies Felice Guarneri wrote to Mussolini that "the empire is swallowing Italy".

Sanctions against Italy pushed Mussolini towards rapprochement with Germany. In 1936, he told the German Ambassador that Italy had no objections to Austria becoming a German satellite, removing a key obstacle to Italo-German relations. After the sanctions ended, France and Britain tried to revive the Stresa Front, seeking to retain Italy as an ally. However, Mussolini felt betrayed by Britain and decided that Germany was the more reliable partner. On 24 July 1936, he reached an agreement with Hitler to send military contingents to Spain to support Francisco Franco, whose coup d'état of 18 July had triggered the Spanish Civil War. The Spanish intervention further consumed funds intended for military modernization, weakening Italy's military power and distancing Mussolini from France and Britain. This worsening relationship with the Western powers led Mussolini to seek closer relations with Germany. On 1 November, he announced in a speech the creation of the Rome-Berlin Axis.

On 25 September 1937 Mussolini went on his first official visit to Germany. Three million Germans lined the route of the official procession, which included a gigantic military parade and a train journey from Munich to Berlin, during which the two trains carrying the heads of state traveled side by side at the same speed, symbolizing "the parallelism of the two revolutions". Enthusiastic crowds gathered in the stations they passed through to acclaim the two dictators. The visit included a trip to the Krupp factories, and culminated in Mussolini's final speech in German before 800,000 people, in which he declared that "Italian fascism has finally found a friend, and it will go with its friend to the end." This triumphant journey had a decisive influence on Mussolini's pro-German turn, as he was fascinated by the display of Nazi military power and subsequently declared that "the future of Europe will be fascist".

On the occasion of Italy's signature on the Anti-Comintern Pact on 6 November 1937, Mussolini had a meeting with Joachim von Ribbentrop, during which he declared that Italy no longer intended to act as a sentinel of Austrian independence. As a result, in March 1938, Hitler was able to proceed with the Anschluss and annex Austria into Germany. Despite initially expressing disapproval of the racist policies implemented by National Socialism, starting in 22 September 1938, coinciding with the alliance with Germany, Mussolini promulgated a series of decrees known as the Racial Laws, which introduced segregationist measures against Italian Jews and the Empire's black subjects. Leading members of the National Fascist Party (PNF), such as Dino Grandi and Italo Balbo, reportedly opposed the Racial Laws and many Italians viewed it as an obvious imposition of German influence on the Italian government.

Thanks to Mussolini's mediation, faced with the possibility of a conflict between the Anglo-French bloc and Germany, the Munich Conference was held on 29 and 30 September. Present were Mussolini, Hitler, Édouard Daladier for France, and Neville Chamberlain for Great Britain; Czechoslovakia submitted to the combination of military pressure by Germany, Poland, and Hungary, and diplomatic pressure by Britain and France, and agreed to surrender territory to Germany which led to its dismemberment. Mussolini was celebrated as "the savior of peace" for having averted the conflict.

== World War II ==
=== Gathering storm ===
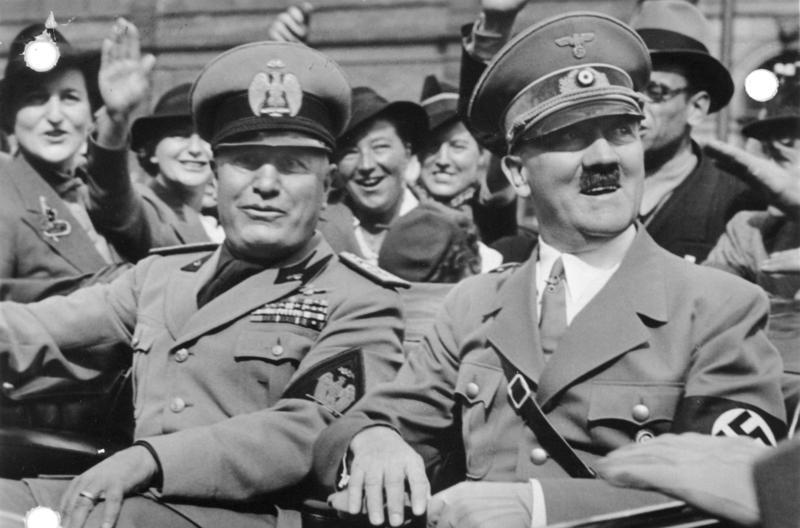
Germany's Führer Adolf Hitler (right) beside Italy's Duce Benito Mussolini (left), 1938

Mussolini was held back from full alignment with Berlin by Italy's economic and military unpreparedness and his desire to use the 1938 Easter Accords to split Britain from France. A military alliance with Germany, rather than the looser political alliance under the Anti-Comintern Pact, would end any chance of Britain implementing the Accords. The Accords were intended by Mussolini to allow Italy to take on France alone, with the hope that improved Anglo-Italian relations would keep Britain neutral in a Franco-Italian war (Mussolini had designs on Tunisia, with some support there). Britain hoped the Accords would win Italy away from Germany.

Count Galeazzo Ciano, Mussolini's son-in-law and foreign minister, summed up Mussolini's objectives in his diary in November 1938: Djibouti would be ruled jointly with France; Tunisia with a similar regime; and Corsica under Italian control. Mussolini showed no interest in Savoy, considering it neither "historically nor geographically Italian". On 30 November 1938, Mussolini provoked the French by orchestrating demonstrations where deputies demanded France turn over Tunisia, Savoy, and Corsica to Italy. This heightened tensions, with France and Italy on the verge of war through the winter of 1938–39.

In January 1939, British prime minister Neville Chamberlain visited Rome. Mussolini learned that Britain would not sever ties with France, so he grew more interested in the German offer of military alliance, first made in May 1938. In February 1939, Mussolini declared that a state's power is "proportional to its maritime position", asserting that Italy was a "prisoner in the Mediterranean", surrounded by British-controlled territories.

The new pro-German course was controversial. On 21 March 1939, during a meeting of the Fascist Grand Council, Italo Balbo accused Mussolini of "licking Hitler's boots" and criticized the pro-German policy as leading Italy to disaster. Despite opposition, Mussolini's control of foreign policy ensured dissenting voices had little impact. In April 1939, Mussolini ordered the invasion of Albania; Italy had already enjoyed an unofficial protectorate over the country, and the invasion was prompted by Mussolini's desire to demonstrate his strength to his German ally. On 22 May 1939, Galeazzo Ciano, Italian foreign minister, signed the Pact of Steel with Germany, which sanctioned the birth of a binding Italian-German alliance.

When concluding the alliance with Germany in May 1939, Mussolini assumed a major European war would not begin before 1942; until then, he believed Italy could expand in the Mediterranean, with German backing, and profit in Southeast Europe from the collapse of the postwar order established by the Paris Peace Conference. This assumption was based on the conviction that neither Britain, France nor Germany would risk a war between the major powers in the short term, which led Mussolini to neglect serious planning for a war with them.

As late as early August 1939, he was convinced German-Polish tensions would be resolved by a "new Munich". It was only on 13 August, when Ciano informed him about his talks with Hitler and Ribbentrop on 11 and 12 August, that Mussolini realized Hitler not only intended to occupy Danzig but was determined to take military action against all of Poland, thus creating the danger of a European war. Unlike Hitler and Ribbentrop, Mussolini considered it almost certain that Britain and France would intervene in a German-Polish conflict. However, if this happened, the conditions for Mussolini's foreign policy strategy would no longer apply. Although tempted, Mussolini knew Italy was unprepared for a global conflict, particularly given King Emmanuel III's demand for neutrality. Thus, when World War II began with Germany's invasion of Poland, Italy remained uninvolved.

=== War declared ===
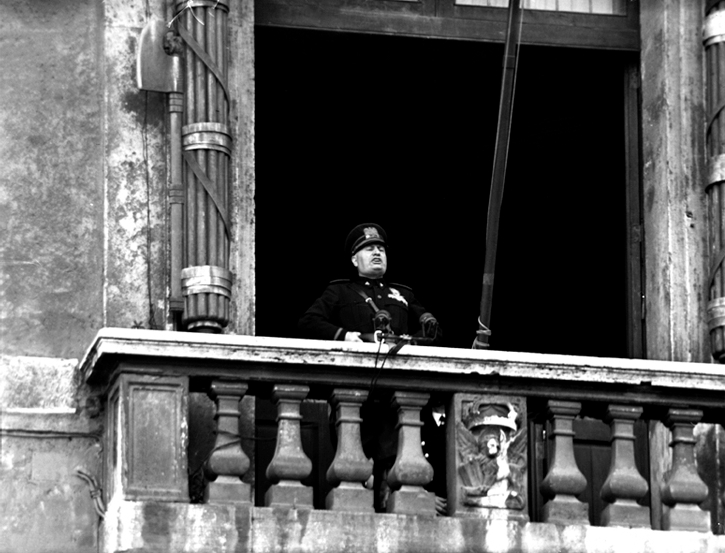
Mussolini delivering his declaration of war speech, from the balcony of the Palazzo Venezia in Rome

As World War II began, Ciano and Viscount Halifax were holding secret phone conversations. The British wanted Italy on their side against Germany as in World War I. French government opinion was geared towards action against Italy, they were eager to attack Italy in Libya. In September 1939, France swung to the opposite extreme, offering to discuss issues with Italy, but as the French were unwilling to discuss Corsica, Nice and Savoy, Mussolini did not answer. Mussolini's Under-Secretary for War Production, Carlo Favagrossa, had estimated that Italy could not be prepared for major military operations until 1942 due to its relatively weak industrial sector. In November 1939, Adolf Hitler declared: "So long as the Duce lives, one can rest assured that Italy will seize every opportunity to achieve its imperialistic aims."

Convinced that the war would soon be over, with a German victory looking likely, Mussolini decided to enter the war on the Axis side. Italy declared war on Britain and France on 10 June 1940. At 6 p.m., Mussolini appeared on the balcony of the Palazzo Venezia to announce that in six hours, Italy would be in a state of war with France and Britain. After a speech explaining his motives for the decision, he concluded: "People of Italy: take up your weapons and show your tenacity, your courage and your valor." But Mussolini had no long term plans prepared. This caused US president Franklin D. Roosevelt to say that "On this tenth day of June 1940, the hand that held the dagger has struck it into the back of its neighbor." Mussolini regarded the war against Britain and France as a life-or-death struggle between opposing ideologies—fascism and the "plutocratic and reactionary democracies of the west"—describing the war as "the struggle of the fertile and young people against the sterile people moving to the sunset; it is the struggle between two centuries and two ideas".

Italy joined the Germans in the Battle of France, by launching the Italian invasion of France just beyond the border. Just eleven days later, France and Germany signed an armistice and on 24 June, Italy and France signed the Franco-Italian Armistice. Included in Italian-controlled France were most of Nice and other southeastern counties. Mussolini planned to concentrate Italian forces on an offensive against the British in Africa and the Middle East, while expecting the collapse of the UK in the European theatre. The Italians invaded Egypt, bombed Mandatory Palestine, and attacked the British in their Sudan, Kenya and British Somaliland colonies (in what became known as the East African Campaign); British Somaliland was conquered and became part of Italian East Africa in August 1940, and there were Italian advances in the Sudan and Kenya.

=== Path to defeat ===
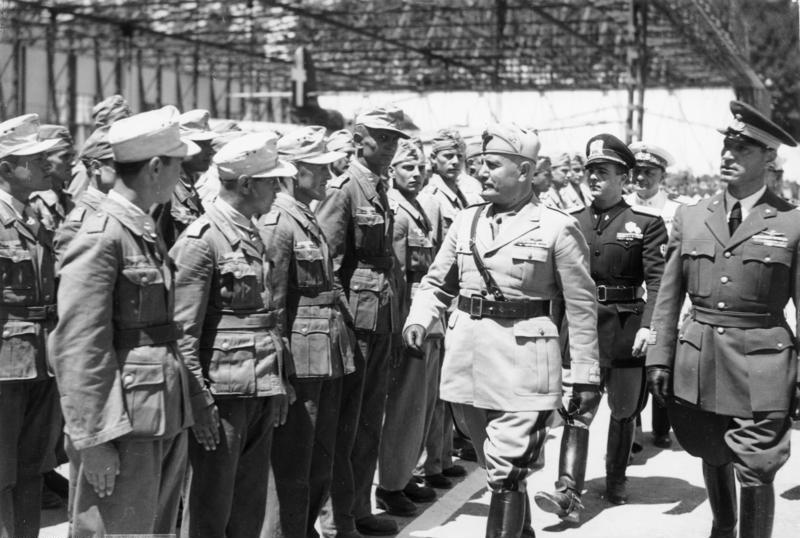
Mussolini reviews a contingent of German airmen on 25 June 1942

In September 1940, the Italian Tenth Army was commanded by Marshal Rodolfo Graziani and crossed from Italian Libya into Egypt, where British forces resided; this became the Western Desert Campaign. Advances were successful, but the Italians stopped at Sidi Barrani waiting for logistic supplies to catch up. On 24 October, Mussolini sent the Italian Air Corps to Belgium, where it took part in the Blitz until January 1941.

On 4 October 1940, Mussolini met with Hitler at the Brenner Pass to establish an agreed military strategy; however, on 12 October, the Germans took control of Romania, located in the Italian zone of influence and rich in oil deposits, without notifying the Italians. Consequently, Mussolini decided to embark on a "parallel war" so as not to depend on Hitler's military and political initiative. Mussolini remained convinced that Britain would come to terms with the Führer and that the main front would thus be closed. On 19 October, the Duce sent Hitler a letter announcing his intention to attack Greece. Hitler went to Florence on 28 October to dissuade Mussolini from the undertaking, but Mussolini, adopting an attitude similar to that of his ally in the attack on Romania, warned him that the attack had already begun hours earlier.

The Greco-Italian War ended in disaster for the Italians: the winter season and the mountainous terrain hindered any advance, partly due to the Italian troops' inadequate equipment. The Greek army proved more combative and organized than expected; the support of British air and naval squadrons also proved decisive. The Italians were forced to retreat into Albanian territory, where only in December 1940 did they manage to halt the enemy's counteroffensive, thus transforming the conflict into a defensive war. Simultaneously, highly mobile British forces attacked the Italian Tenth Army in western Egypt during Operation Compass, swiftly defeating them and annilihating most of the army after cutting off their retreat in Tripolitania. In East Africa, an attack was mounted against Italian forces. Despite putting up stiff resistance, they were overwhelmed at the Battle of Keren, and Italian defence crumbled with defeat in the Battle of Gondar. When addressing the Italian public, Mussolini was open about the situation, saying: "We call bread bread and wine wine, and when the enemy wins a battle it is useless and ridiculous to seek, as the English do in their incomparable hypocrisy, to deny or diminish it."

On 19 and 20 January 1941, in Berchtesgaden, Mussolini met Hitler, who promised to send him equipment and German contingents to Greece and North Africa to support the Italian troops. Thanks to German aid and better military preparation, Italy improved its performance but abandoned the "parallel war" and ended up conducting the conflict in accordance with the directives and interests of the Germans, that is, in a conflict to the right of the most powerful ally on which the outcome of the conflict depended, a situation that Bottai and Ciano had foreseen and defined as a "convergent war". It was to avoid being indebted to Hitler that Mussolini conceived the idea of mutual aid and dragged Italy into war also against the Soviet Union and US.

Ugo Cavallero was called to replace Badoglio and reorganized the General Staff into the Supreme Command. On 9 February, the British Navy bombed Genoa. On 11 February, the Duce met Francisco Franco in Bordighera to convince him to enter the war on the side of the Axis, but failed. Starting on 12 February, military aid promised by the Führer arrived in Libya: the German Afrika Korps, composed mainly of armored vehicles (panzers) and air reinforcements, under the command of Erwin Rommel.

Taking on the de facto role of commander of the Italian troops in the region, Rommel reorganized them and lead an effective offensive against the British. By May, the Axis troops regained control of Libya, repelled an attempted counter-offensive (Operation Brevity) and conquered Egyptian border territory. As a result of the defeats suffered, command of the British troops was entrusted to General Archibald Wavell; he commanded a major offensive (Operation Battleaxe) aimed at relieving the siege of Tobruk, but failed.

On 27 March, in Yugoslavia, which had joined the Tripartite Pact, the British successfully staged a coup led by Serbian nationalist general Dušan Simović. The new Yugoslav government signed a treaty of friendship with the Soviet Union on 5 April. Faced with the risk posed by strengthened British presence in the Balkans and a possible anti-Axis alliance between Yugoslavia and the Soviet Union, Germany, Hungary and Bulgaria attacked Yugoslavia. On the same day, Italy also declared war on it. The Italian advance proved a success in the Slovenian area and Dalmatia, and Yugoslavia quickly capitulated on 17 April. Italy gained most of the Dalmatian coast, the province of Ljubljana, Montenegro and established the puppet state of Croatia, while Kosovo was annexed by Italian Albania.

Meanwhile, Italian troops, after months of stalemate, resumed their advance in Albania, which was reconquered within days, and reached Epirus. The Italian and German armies jointly launched a new attack on Greece, which signed its surrender with Germany on 21 April. Mussolini, who felt humiliated by Italy's exclusion from the peace treaty, demanded his rights be respected. By order of Hitler, the signing ceremony was then repeated two days later, in the presence of Italian authorities. On 3 May, Italian-German troops marched through Athens, and on 1 June Crete fell, the last remaining enemy outpost in the region. Although the conquest of the Balkans was due to the intervention of German forces, Mussolini obtained the right to occupy the Ionian Islands and most of Greece, which did not fall within the German sphere of influence. General Mario Robotti, Commander of the Italian XI Corps in Slovenia and Croatia, issued an order in line with a directive received from Mussolini in June 1942: "I would not be opposed to all (sic) Slovenes being imprisoned and replaced by Italians. In other words, we should take steps to ensure that political and ethnic frontiers coincide".

Mussolini first learned of Operation Barbarossa after the invasion of the Soviet Union began on 22 June 1941, and was not asked by Hitler to involve himself. On 25 June, he inspected the first units at Verona, which served as his launching pad to Russia. Mussolini told the Council of Ministers of 5 July that his only worry was that Germany might defeat the Soviet Union before the Italians arrived. At a meeting with Hitler in August, Mussolini offered and Hitler accepted the commitment of further Italian troops to fight the Soviet Union. The heavy losses suffered by the Italians on the Eastern Front, where service was extremely unpopular owing to the widespread view that this was not Italy's fight, damaged Mussolini's prestige with Italians. After the Japanese attack on Pearl Harbor, he declared war on the United States on 11 December 1941. Evidence regarding Mussolini's response to the attack on Pearl Harbor comes from the diary of his foreign minister Ciano:

A night telephone call from Ribbentrop. He is overjoyed about the Japanese attack on America. He is so happy about it that I am happy with him, though I am not too sure about the final advantages of what has happened. One thing is now certain, that America will enter the conflict and that the conflict will be so long that she will be able to realize all her potential forces. This morning I told this to the King who had been pleased about the event. He ended by admitting that, in the long run, I may be right. Mussolini was happy, too. For a long time he has favored a definite clarification of relations between America and the Axis.

Italian forces had achieved success in the Balkans by suppressing partisan insurgency in Yugoslavia, Greece, Albania and in Montenegro. The Regia Marina initiated a successful campaign involving the use of frogmen and manned torpedoes to attack ships in harbour. The Decima Flottiglia MAS which carried out these attacks, sank or damaged 28 ships from September 1940 to the end of 1942. In North Africa, together with German forces, Italian forces drove the British out of Libya during the Battle of Gazala. They subsequently pushed towards Egypt with the aim of capturing Alexandria and the Suez Canal, but the offensive was halted at El Alamein in summer 1942. Following Vichy France's collapse and the Case Anton in November 1942, Italy occupied the French territories of Corsica and Tunisia. Although Mussolini was aware that Italy, whose resources were reduced by the campaigns of the 1930s, was not ready for a long war, he opted to remain in the conflict to not abandon the occupied territories and imperial ambitions.

=== Dismissal and arrest ===
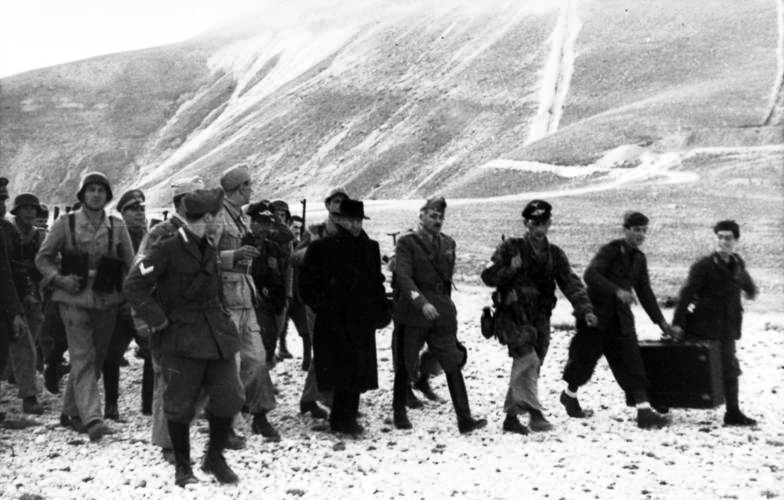
Mussolini rescued by German troops from his prison in Campo Imperatore on 12 September 1943

In early 1943, Italy's military position was becoming untenable as in the space of a few months, the Axis suffered two major defeats. Italian and German forces were defeated at the Second Battle of El Alamein in October 1942 by British and Commonwealth forces and were driven out of Egypt. On 8 November 1942, with Operation Torch, Anglo-American troops landed in Morocco and Algeria, Libya was quickly lost, and Italian-German troops fled to Tunisia. On 13 May, the last Axis troops, under the command of General Giovanni Messe, surrendered during the Tunisian campaign. Mussolini ordered Messe to accept the surrender which resulted in 200,000 Italians being captured by the Allies. On the Eastern Front, the Italian Army in Russia under Italo Gariboldi was defeated at the Battle of Stalingrad, it suffered massive losses in men and material, forcing the Italian and German commanders to order its withdrawal. The survivors returned home between April and May 1943: over 60,000 Italian soldiers were officially missing, most of them prisoners who would die in Soviet detention camps.

The Italian home front was also in a bad situation as Allied bombings were taking their toll. Factories were brought to a virtual standstill because raw materials were lacking. There was a chronic food shortage, and what food was available was sold at nearly confiscatory prices. Mussolini's once-ubiquitous propaganda machine lost its grip; many Italians turned to Vatican Radio or Radio London for more accurate news. Discontent came to a head in March 1943 with a wave of labour strikes in the industrial north—the first large-scale strikes since 1925. Mussolini was so psychologically shattered by the successive Italian defeats that his health deteriorated. He suffered from chronic insomnia and his severe stomach pain began to intensify, which now became intolerable.

Mussolini feared that with Allied victory in North Africa, Allied armies would come across the Mediterranean and attack Italy. In April 1943, as the Allies closed into Tunisia, Mussolini had urged Hitler to make a separate peace with the Soviet Union and send German troops to the west to guard against an expected Allied invasion of Italy. The Allies landed in Sicily on 10 July 1943, and within days it was obvious the Italian army was on the brink of collapse. The German presence in Italy had turned public opinion against Mussolini; when the Allies invaded Sicily, they were welcomed as liberators. This led Hitler to summon Mussolini to a meeting in Feltre on 19 July 1943. Mussolini was so shaken from stress he could no longer stand Hitler's boasting. His mood darkened further when that same day, the Allies bombed Rome—the first time that city had ever been the target of enemy bombing. It was obvious the war was lost, but Mussolini could not extricate himself from the German alliance.

By this point, prominent members of Mussolini's government had turned against him, including Grandi and Ciano. Several colleagues were close to revolt, and Mussolini was forced to summon the Grand Council on 24 July 1943. This was the first time the body had met since the start of the war. When he announced that the Germans were thinking of evacuating the south, Grandi launched a blistering attack on him. Grandi moved a resolution asking the king to resume his full constitutional powers—in effect, a vote of no confidence in Mussolini. This motion carried by a 19–8 margin. Mussolini showed little reaction, even though this authorised the king to sack him. He did, however, ask Grandi to consider the possibility that this motion would spell the end of Fascism. The vote, although significant, had no de jure effect, since in Italy's constitutional monarchy the prime minister was responsible only to the king and only the king could dismiss the prime minister.

Despite this sharp rebuke, Mussolini continued at work the next day. He viewed the Grand Council as merely an advisory body and did not think the vote would have any substantive effect. That afternoon, at 17:00, he was summoned to the royal palace by Victor Emmanuel. By then, Emmanuel had decided to sack him; the king had arranged an escort for Mussolini and had the government building surrounded by 200 carabinieri. Mussolini was unaware of these moves by the king and tried to tell him about the Grand Council meeting. Emmanuel cut him off and formally dismissed him from office, although guaranteeing his immunity. After Mussolini left the palace, he was arrested by the carabinieri on the king's orders without telling him that he was formally arrested, but rather under protective custody, as Victor Emmanuel III was trying to save the monarchy. The police took Mussolini in a Red Cross ambulance car, without specifying his destination and assuring him that they were doing it for his safety. By this time, discontent with Mussolini was so intense that when the news of his downfall was announced on the radio, there was no resistance. People rejoiced because they believed that the end of Mussolini meant the end of the war. The king appointed Marshal Pietro Badoglio as prime minister.

In an effort to conceal his location from the Germans, Mussolini was moved around: first to Ponza, then La Maddalena, before imprisonment at Campo Imperatore, a mountain resort in Abruzzo where he was completely isolated. Badoglio kept up the appearance of loyalty to Germany, and announced that Italy would continue fighting on the side of the Axis. However, he dissolved the Fascist Party and began negotiating with the Allies. On 3 September 1943, Badoglio agreed to an Armistice between Italy and Allied armed forces. Its announcement five days later threw Italy into chaos; German troops seized control in Operation Achse. As the Germans approached Rome, Badoglio and the king fled with their main collaborators to Apulia, putting themselves under the protection of the Allies, but leaving the army without orders. After a period of anarchy, they formed a government in Malta, and declared war on Germany on 13 October 1943. Several thousand Italian troops joined the Allies to fight against the Germans; most others deserted or surrendered to the Germans; some refused to switch sides and joined the Germans. The Badoglio government agreed to a political truce with the predominantly leftist Partisans for the sake of Italy and to rid the land of the Nazis.

=== Italian Social Republic ===
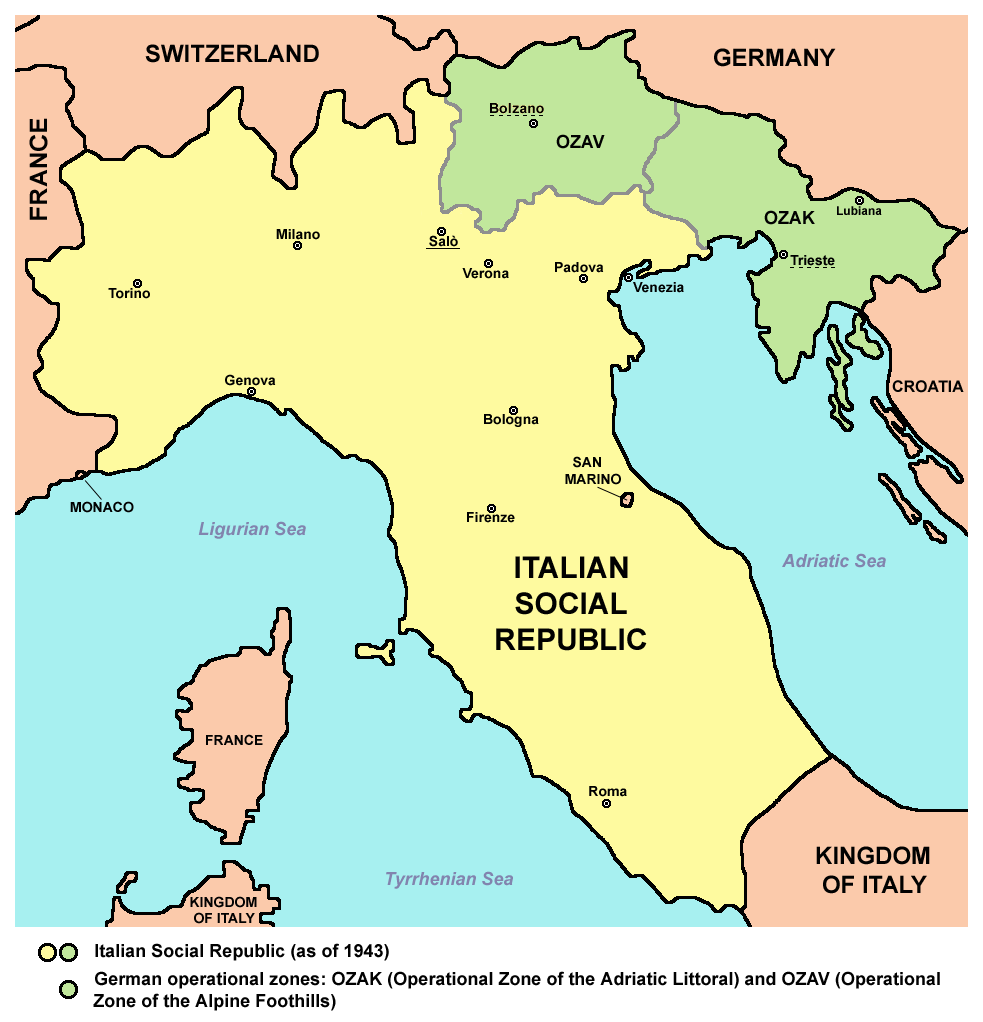
Italian Social Republic (RSI) as of 1943 German military operational zones (OZAV/OZAK) under direct German administration

Only two months after Mussolini had been dismissed and arrested, he was rescued from his prison at the Hotel Campo Imperatore in the Gran Sasso raid on 12 September 1943 by a special Fallschirmjäger (paratroopers) unit and Waffen-SS commandos led by Major Otto-Harald Mors; Otto Skorzeny was also present. The rescue saved Mussolini from being turned over to the Allies in accordance with the armistice. Hitler had made plans to arrest the king, the Crown Prince Umberto, Badoglio, and the rest of the government and restore Mussolini to power, but the government's escape south likely foiled those plans.

Three days after his rescue in the Gran Sasso raid, Mussolini was taken to Germany for a meeting with Hitler in Rastenburg at his East Prussian headquarters. Despite his public support, Hitler was clearly shocked by Mussolini's dishevelled appearance and his unwillingness to go after the men in Rome who overthrew him. Feeling he had to do what he could to blunt the edges of Nazi repression, Mussolini agreed to set up a new regime, the Italian Social Republic (Italian: Repubblica Sociale Italiana, RSI), informally known as the Salò Republic because of its seat in the town of Salò, where he was settled 11 days after his rescue. His new regime was much reduced in territory; in addition to losing the Italian lands held by the Allies and Badoglio's government, the provinces of Bolzano, Belluno and Trento were placed under German administration in the Operational Zone of the Alpine Foothills, while the provinces of Udine, Gorizia, Trieste, Pola (now Pula), Fiume (now Rijeka), and Ljubljana (Lubiana in Italian) were incorporated into the German Operational Zone of the Adriatic Littoral.

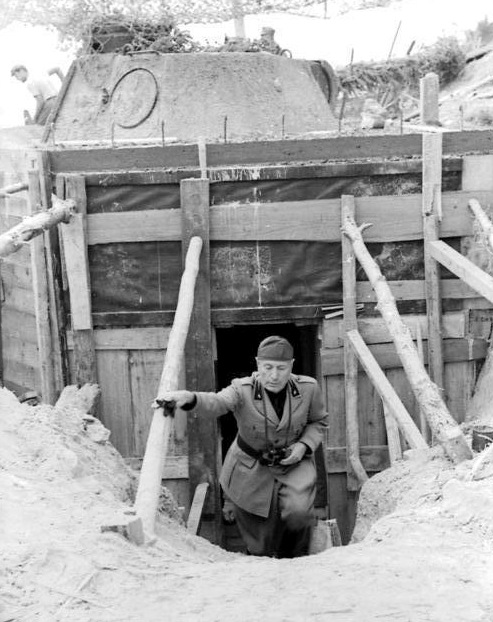
Mussolini inspecting fortifications, 1944

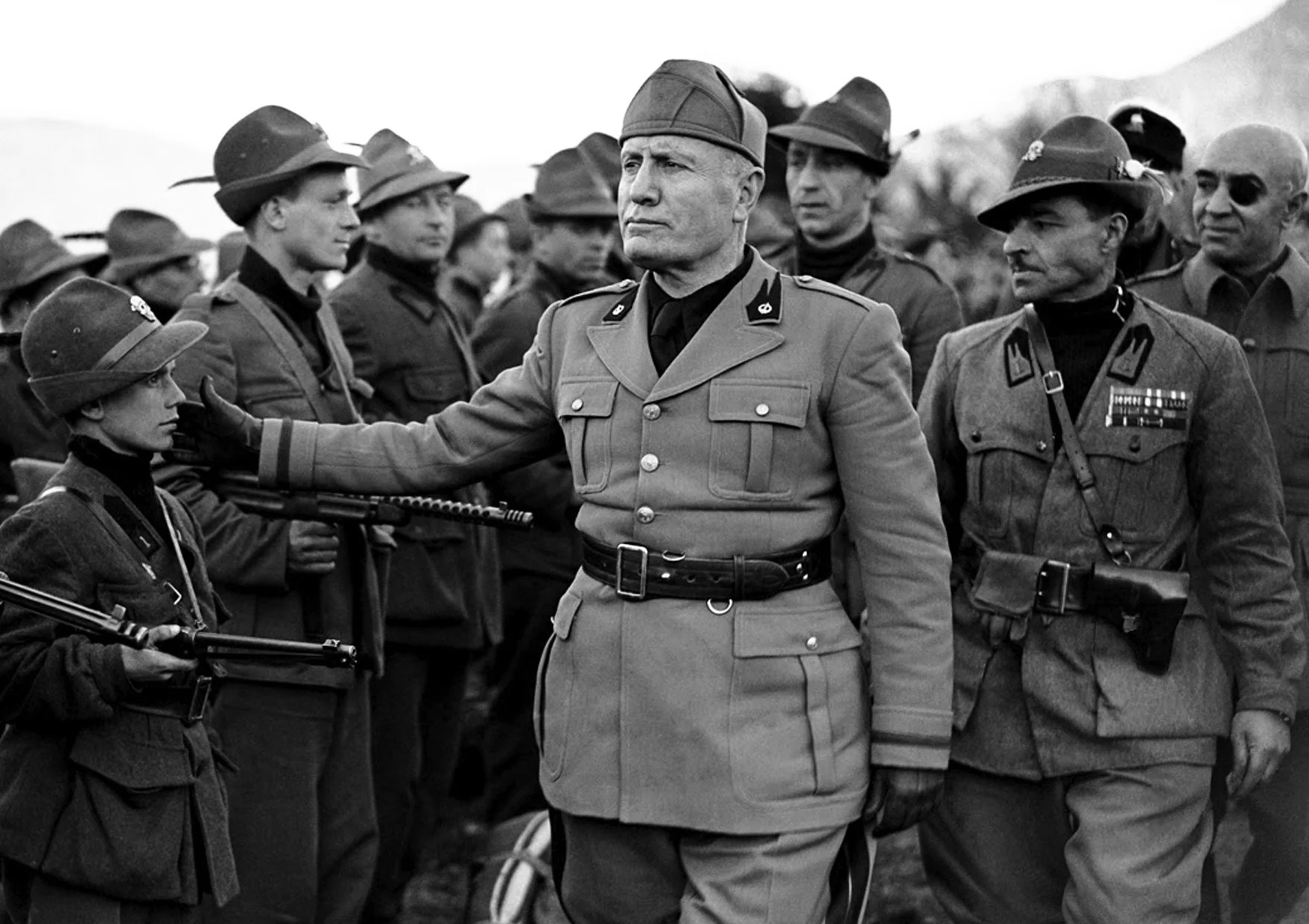
Mussolini reviews 5th Alpine Mobile Black Brigade "E. Quagliata", Brescia, 1945.

German forces occupied the Dalmatian provinces of Split (Spalato) and Kotor (Cattaro), which were subsequently annexed by the Croatian fascist regime. Italy's conquests in Greece and Albania were also lost to Germany, with the exception of the Italian Islands of the Aegean, which remained nominally under RSI rule. Mussolini opposed any territorial reductions of the Italian state and told his associates:

I am not here to renounce even a square meter of state territory. We will go back to war for this. And we will rebel against anyone for this. Where the Italian flag flew, the Italian flag will return. And where it has not been lowered, now that I am here, no one will have it lowered. I have said these things to the Führer.

On 18 September, Mussolini proclaimed the Italian Social Republic on Munich radio. The Republican Fascist Party was entrusted to Alessandro Pavolini. A government was formed with figures such as Rodolfo Graziani, imposed by the Germans as minister of war, Guido Buffarini Guidi as minister of the interior, Fernando Mezzasoma as minister of popular culture and Francesco Maria Barracu as the under-secretary to the president of the council, who effectively handled much of Mussolini's day-to-day domestic administration. The new team established itself on the shores of Lake Garda, further from the front lines, particularly in Salò, which would lend its historical name to the short-lived republic. Mussolini took up residence in a villa belonging to the Feltrinelli family near Gargnano, while the presidential offices were located at the Villa Orsoline in the town center.

Priority was given to reconstituting the Militia, transformed into the National Republican Guard (GNR) with a strength of 140,000 men under the command of Renato Ricci, which would be used primarily in the fight against partisans. In June 1944 the Black Brigades, comprising 11,000 men under Pavolini's command, were created with Party members aged 18 to 60. Graziani had more difficulty forming a regular army, as the Germans preferred to use Italians as laborers in the Reich's armaments factories rather than as soldiers. He did, however, manage to assemble four divisions of volunteers trained in Germany, however this was not deployed on the front against the Anglo-American forces as Mussolini had desired, but instead relegated to auxiliary units of the German Wehrmacht. On 14 November the first congress of the Republican Fascist Party was held in Verona, during which the Manifesto of Verona was adopted, returning to the anti-capitalist program of the Fascists of 1919. Mussolini participated in drafting the manifesto but did not take action. The program would not be implemented, and the Duce, unable to break free from the Germans, would turn away from his role as a figurehead.

At the congress, it was decided to establish a special tribunal to try and punish the members of the Grand Council who had voted for the Grandi agenda and who had been apprehended. Between 8 and 10 January 1944, the Verona Trial took place, a legal farce orchestrated by the Party's ultra-loyalists, Roberto Farinacci and Pavolini: five of the six defendants were sentenced to death, including the Duce's son-in-law, Galeazzo Ciano. Mussolini did not intervene in the trial, despite his daughter's pleas, so as not to lose face before Hitler and what remained of his authority among his hardline supporters, and allowed his son-in-law to be shot in the back, his hands tied to a chair. For eighteen months, Italy would be divided in two, on either side of the front line: the Gustav Line at the level of Latium and Abruzzo, then in August 1944 after the Allied capture of Rome, the Gothic Line (Pisa–Rimini). In Fascist Italy, the first partisan groups, formed with communists and other anti-fascists and coordinated by a National Liberation Committee, formed and carried out sabotage and guerrilla actions, resulting in roundups, torture, reprisals and massacres by the Black Brigades, the SS and the Gestapo.

Mussolini, relegated to the role of mere executor of Hitler's wishes, requested a meeting to obtain greater autonomy. Hitler received him on 22 April but he only received vague promises. In July 1944 he traveled to Germany to inspect the four Italian divisions that the Germans had trained and delivered martial speeches acclaimed by the regiments in full dress uniform. His interview with 20 July, the meeting with Hitler, who had just escaped a bomb attack, was the last encounter between two. Before leaving, Hitler told him: "I know I can count on you. Please believe me when I say that I consider you my best friend, and perhaps the only friend I have in the world."

In December 1944, Mussolini came to Milan to deliver one last public speech. The event has been romanticized among Fascist sympathizers as a moment of great significance. Mussolini was greeted by "spontaneous and deafening applause". In this pious account, the people of Milan treated their leader to "a hero's welcome" when he subsequently toured the war-damaged streets. Despite this incident, Mussolini would become increasingly depressed, he gave an interview in January 1945 to Madeleine Mollier, a few months before he was captured and executed, and he stated flatly: "Seven years ago, I was an interesting person. Now, I am little more than a corpse." He continued:

Yes, madam, I am finished. My star has fallen. I have no fight left in me. I work and I try, yet know that all is but a farce... I await the end of the tragedy and—strangely detached from everything—I do not feel any more an actor. I feel I am the last of spectators.

== Death ==
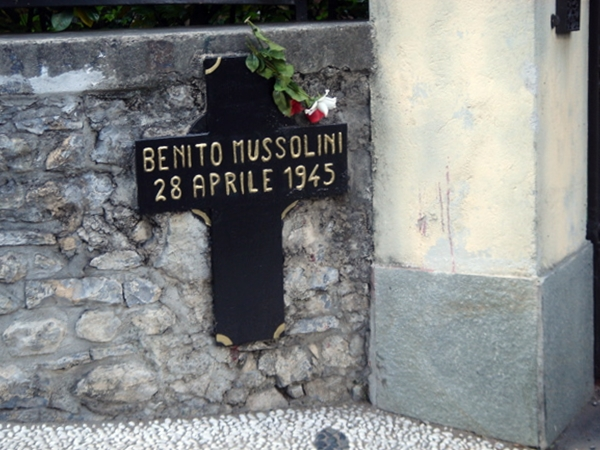
Cross marking the place in Mezzegra where Mussolini was shot

American newsreel coverage of the death of Mussolini in 1945; execution images show persons other than Mussolini.

In April 1945, after the Gothic Line front had collapsed and the German forces in Italy were now retreating, Mussolini moved to Milan. Between 20 and 22 April, he gave his last interview, to Gian Gaetano Cabella, director of Il Popolo di Alessandria. On 25 April, he obtained a meeting with Cardinal Ildefonso Schuster, who was attempting to mediate the surrender of the Fascist forces with the National Liberation Committee for Northern Italy, hoping to avoid further bloodshed. However, Mussolini's indecision and the intransigence of the parties made any agreement impossible. The German SS commanders (General Karl Wolff), shortly before the Duce's arrival, informed the cardinal that they no longer needed him, having in the meantime attempted to negotiate a truce with the CLN. Having heard the news from Schuster, an enraged Mussolini interrupted the discussion and hastily left the archbishopric.

On the evening of the 25th, he gave the order to depart for Como in the direction of the Valtellina, the last "redoubt". The column consisted of about ten cars, including Mussolini's open Alfa Romeo, and two German armored vehicles carrying his SS guard. He was joined by Alessandro Pavolini and his Blackshirts: 200 vehicles, some artillery, and a few armored vehicles. At Como, the first overnight stop, he was joined by Guido Buffarini Guidi and his mistress Clara Petacci, which irritated him. At 4:30 a.m. on the 26th, the convoy headed back towards Menaggio, circling the Swiss border without crossing it. Buffarini Guidi tried to cross into Switzerland but he was arrested by the resistance and shot in Milan on 10 July. Rodolfo Graziani returned to surrender to the Americans.

At Menaggio, the column was reinforced by about thirty German trucks carrying a detachment of 200 soldiers retreating towards the Brenner Pass. The fugitives waited at Grandola for the arrival of Pavolini, who arrived around 4 a.m. on 27 April in a large armored vehicle, almost alone, his Blackshirts having remained in Como, refusing to go any further. Mussolini decided to join the German detachment. He abandoned his Alfa Romeo and got into Pavolini's armored vehicle with two briefcases that he never left behind. The assets on Mussolini's convoy at the time of his capture became known as the Dongo Treasure.

On 27 April at 7 a.m., the column was stopped at Musso by a partisan roadblock, an outpost of the 52nd Garibaldi Brigade led by Pier Luigi Bellini delle Stelle. The Germans outnumbered them but were unwilling to fight and eager to leave. According to instructions from the Council of the Resistance, the partisans were prepared to let the Germans pass, but not the Italians. An agreement was reached: the cars would be inspected at Dongo, a few kilometers away. SS Lieutenant Birzer, who commanded Mussolini's guard, suggested that he take a seat in the back of a vehicle in the German column, equipped with a Luftwaffe greatcoat and a German helmet. During the inspection, Mussolini was recognized and arrested by the Italian partisan Urbano Lazzaro.

With the spread of the news of the arrest, several telegrams arrived at the command of the National Liberation Committee for Northern Italy from the Office of Strategic Services headquarters in Siena with the request that Mussolini be entrusted to Allied forces. In fact, clause number 29 of the armistice signed in Malta by Eisenhower and the Marshal of Italy Pietro Badoglio on 29 September 1943, expressly provided that:

Benito Mussolini, his main Fascist associates and all persons suspected of having committed crimes of war or similar crimes, whose names are on the lists that will be delivered by the United Nations and which now or in the future are in territory controlled by the Allied Military Command or by the Italian Government, will be immediately arrested and handed over to the United Nations forces.

The next day, Mussolini and Petacci were both summarily shot, along with most of the members of their 15-man train, primarily ministers and officials of the Italian Social Republic. The shootings took place in the small village of Giulino di Mezzegra and were conducted by a partisan leader with the nom de guerre Colonnello Valerio. His real identity is unknown, but conventionally he is thought to have been Walter Audisio, who always claimed to have carried out the execution, though another partisan controversially alleged that Colonnello Valerio was Luigi Longo, subsequently a leading communist politician.

=== Mussolini's corpse ===
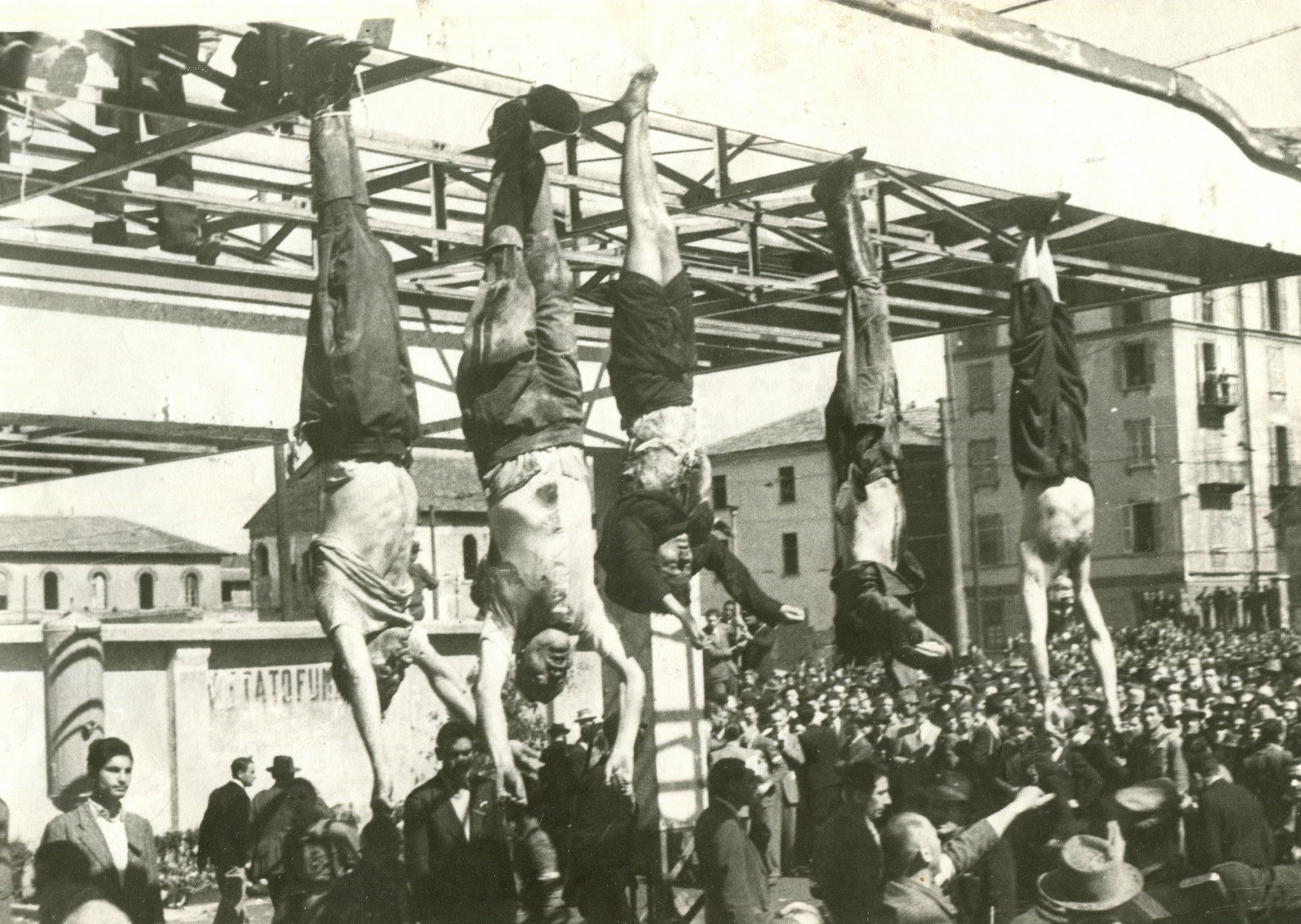
From left to right, the bodies of Bombacci, Mussolini, Petacci, Pavolini and Starace in Piazzale Loreto, 1945

On 29 April 1945, the bodies of Mussolini, Petacci, and the other executed fascists were loaded into a van and moved south to Milan. At 3:00 a.m., the corpses were dumped on the ground in the old Piazzale Loreto. The piazza had been renamed Piazza Quindici Martiri ('fifteen martyrs' square') in honour of fifteen Italian partisans recently executed there.

After being kicked and spat upon, the bodies were hung upside down from the roof of a service station and stoned from below by civilians. This was done both to discourage any fascists from continuing the fight and as an act of revenge for the hanging of partisans in the same place by Axis authorities. The corpse of the deposed leader was subjected to ridicule and abuse.

== Personal life ==
Mussolini's first wife was Ida Dalser, whom he married in Trento in 1914. The couple had a son the following year and named him Benito Albino Mussolini. In December 1915, Mussolini married Rachele Guidi, who had been his mistress since 1910. Due to his upcoming political ascendency, the information about his first marriage was suppressed, and both his first wife and son were later persecuted. With Rachele, Mussolini had two daughters, Edda and Anna Maria; and three sons: Vittorio, Bruno and Romano. Mussolini had several mistresses, among them Margherita Sarfatti and his final companion, Clara Petacci. Mussolini also had many brief sexual encounters with female supporters, as reported by his biographer Nicholas Farrell.

Imprisonment may have been the cause of Mussolini's claustrophobia. He refused to enter the Blue Grotto and preferred large rooms like his 18 by 12 by 12 m (60 by 40 by 40 feet) office at the Palazzo Venezia.

Mussolini spoke the dialect of his native region and used it in familiar conversation with his brother Arnaldo. In addition to Italian, Mussolini spoke English, French, and sufficient German to dispense with an interpreter. This was notable at the Munich Conference, as no other national leader spoke anything other than his native language; Mussolini was described as effectively being the "chief interpreter".

== Ideology ==
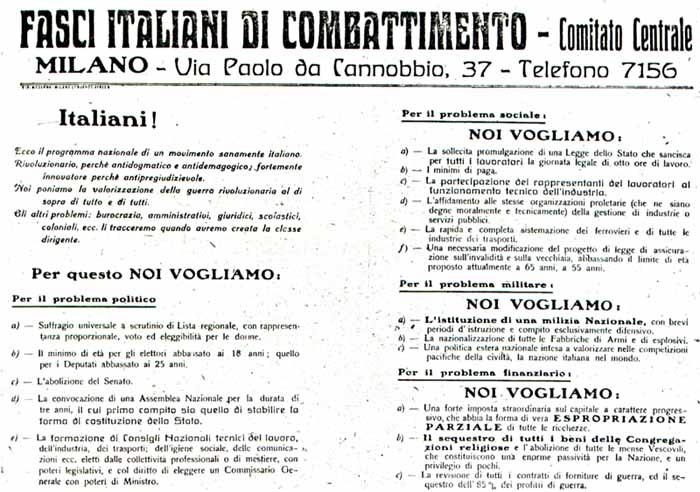
The platform of Fasci italiani di combattimento, as published in Il Popolo d'Italia on 6 June 1919

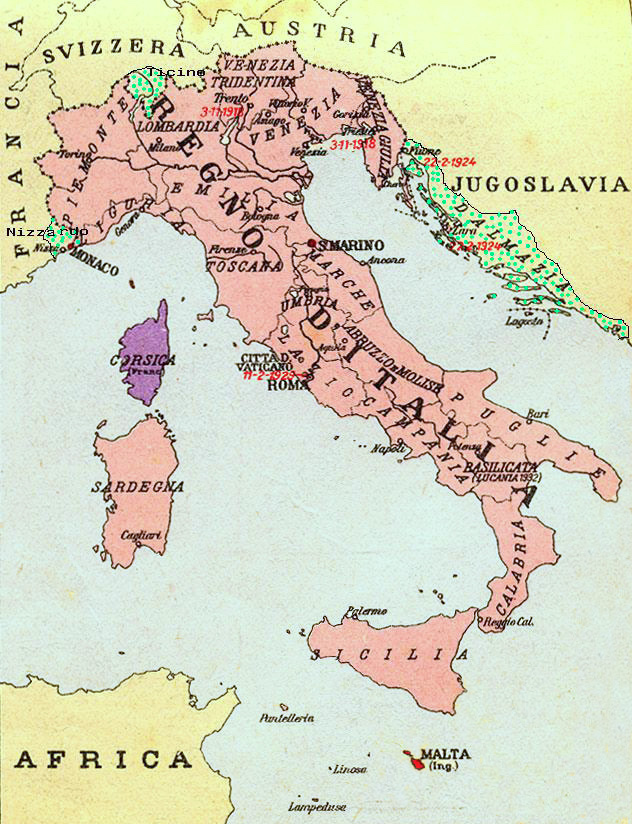
Italian ethnic regions claimed in the 1930s by the Italian irredentism: *Green: Nice, Ticino and Dalmatia *Red: Malta *Violet: Corsica *Savoy and Corfu were later claimed.

The ideological basis for fascism came from a number of sources. Mussolini drew from the works of Plato, Georges Sorel, Friedrich Nietzsche, and the economic ideas of Vilfredo Pareto. Mussolini admired Plato's Republic, which he often read for inspiration. The Republic expounded a number of ideas that fascism promoted, such as rule by an elite promoting the state as the ultimate end, opposition to democracy, protecting the class system and promoting class collaboration, rejection of egalitarianism, promoting the militarisation of a nation by creating a class of warriors, demanding that citizens perform civic duties in the interest of the state, and utilising state intervention in education to promote the development of warriors and future rulers of the state.

The idea behind Mussolini's foreign policy was that of spazio vitale ('living space'), a concept in Italian Fascism that was analogous to Lebensraum in German National Socialism. The concept of spazio vitale was first announced in 1919, when the entire Mediterranean, especially the so-called Julian March, was redefined to make it appear a unified region that had belonged to Italy from the times of the ancient Roman province of Italia, and was claimed as Italy's exclusive sphere of influence. The right to colonise the neighbouring Slovene ethnic areas and the Mediterranean, being inhabited by what were alleged to be less developed peoples, was justified on the grounds that Italy was allegedly suffering from overpopulation.

Borrowing the idea first developed by Enrico Corradini before 1914 of the natural conflict between "plutocratic" nations like Britain and "proletarian" nations like Italy, Mussolini claimed that Italy's principal problem was that "plutocratic" countries like Britain were blocking Italy from achieving the necessary spazio vitale that would let the Italian economy grow. Mussolini equated a nation's potential for economic growth with territorial size, thus in his view the problem of poverty in Italy could only be solved by winning the necessary spazio vitale.

Though biological racism was less prominent in Italian Fascism than in National Socialism, right from the start the spazio vitale concept had a strong racist undercurrent. Mussolini asserted there was a "natural law" for stronger peoples to subject and dominate "inferior" peoples such as the "barbaric" Slavic peoples of Yugoslavia. He stated in a September 1920 speech:

When dealing with such a race as Slavic—inferior and barbarian—we must not pursue the carrot, but the stick policy ... We should not be afraid of new victims ... The Italian border should run across the Brenner Pass, Monte Nevoso and the Dinaric Alps ... I would say we can easily sacrifice 500,000 barbaric Slavs for 50,000 Italians ...

— Benito Mussolini, speech held in Pola, 20 September 1920

Mussolini was heavily inspired by Nietzsche and his concept of a Übermensch. This led to his creation of a "new Italian", heroic, endowed with a sense of belonging to the nation, capable of shaping history through his own actions, inserted into a State that embodies his aspirations. This was to be achieved through the complete overcoming of individualism and the connected individualistic conception of freedom: the individual must exercise his freedom not in a selfish way, in a competitive perspective with other subjects, but in an orderly and disciplined way, conceiving himself as part of a community (the Italian nation embodied by the fascist state) directed towards a common goal and not divided by class hatred (the socialist concept of "class struggle" was abandoned). To this end, the need was affirmed to strengthen the feeling of national belonging through the exaltation of the Italian patriotic spirit and of Italian history. Therefore, the interest of the state prevails over that of individuals in the name of achieving the common good; it has its own mission and awareness: to exalt the national essence. Fascism was to be exhausted not in the fascist state, but in the state of all Italians. Mussolini and the fascists managed to be simultaneously revolutionary and traditionalist; because this was vastly different from anything else in the political climate of the time, it is sometimes described as "The Third Way".

== Religious views ==
=== Atheism and anti-clericalism ===
Mussolini was raised by a devoutly Catholic mother and an anti-clerical father. His mother Rosa had him baptised into the Catholic Church, and took her children to Mass every Sunday. His father never attended. Mussolini regarded his time at a religious boarding school as punishment, compared the experience to hell, and "once refused to go to morning Mass and had to be dragged there by force".

Mussolini became anti-clerical like his father. As a young man, he "proclaimed himself to be an atheist and several times tried to shock an audience by calling on God to strike him dead". He then believed that science had proven there was no God, and that the historical Jesus was ignorant and mad. He also considered religion a disease of the psyche, and accused Christianity of promoting resignation and cowardice.

Also while a young man, Mussolini made vitriolic attacks against Christianity and the Catholic Church, which he accompanied with provocative remarks about the consecrated host, and about a love affair between Christ and Mary Magdalene. He denounced socialists who were tolerant of religion, or who had their children baptised, and called for socialists who accepted religious marriage to be expelled from the party. He denounced the Catholic Church in 1904 for "its authoritarianism and refusal to allow freedom of thought ..." Mussolini's newspaper, La Lotta di Classe, reportedly had an anti-Christian editorial stance.

Mussolini was an admirer of Friedrich Nietzsche from his early professional years. According to Denis Mack Smith, "In Nietzsche he found justification for his crusade against the Christian virtues of humility, resignation, charity, and goodness." He valued Nietzsche's concept of the superman, "The supreme egoist who defied both God and the masses, who despised egalitarianism and democracy, who believed in the weakest going to the wall and pushing them if they did not go fast enough." On his 60th birthday, Hitler gave Mussolini a complete twenty-four volume set of the works of Nietzsche.

Mussolini is claimed to be superstitious, because after hearing of the curse of the Pharaohs around 1922, he ordered the immediate removal of an Egyptian mummy that he had been gifted from the Palazzo Chigi.

=== Lateran Treaty ===
After taking power, Mussolini tried to win popular support by appeasing the Catholic majority in Italy. Mussolini had had his children baptised in 1923. In 1924, Mussolini saw to it that three of his children were given Communion. In 1925, he had a priest perform a Catholic marriage for himself and his wife Rachele, whom he had married in a civil ceremony 10 years earlier. On 11 February 1929, he signed a concordat and treaty with the Catholic Church. Under the Lateran Pact, Vatican City was granted independent statehood and placed under Church law—rather than Italian law—and the Catholic religion was recognised as Italy's state religion. The Church also regained authority over marriage, Catholicism could be taught in all secondary schools, birth control and freemasonry were banned, and the clergy received subsidies from the state and was exempted from taxation. Pope Pius XI praised Mussolini, and the official Catholic newspaper pronounced "Italy has been given back to God and God to Italy."

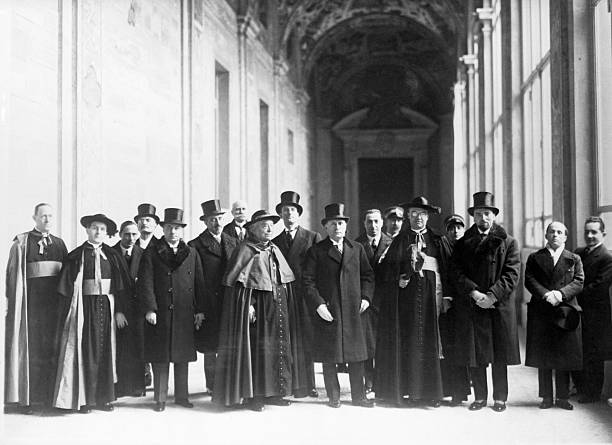
Vatican and Italian delegations prior to signing the treaty

After this conciliation, he claimed the Church was subordinate to the State, and "referred to Catholicism as, in origin, a minor sect that had spread beyond Palestine only because grafted onto the organization of the Roman empire". After the concordat, "he confiscated more issues of Catholic newspapers in the next three months than in the previous seven years". Mussolini reportedly came close to being excommunicated from the Catholic Church around this time.

Mussolini publicly reconciled with the Pope Pius XI in 1932, but "took care to exclude from the newspapers any photography of himself kneeling or showing deference to the Pope". He wanted to persuade Catholics that "fascism was Catholic and he himself a believer who spent some of each day in prayer ..." The Pope began referring to Mussolini as "a man sent by Providence". Despite Mussolini's efforts to appear pious, by order of his party, pronouns referring to him "had to be capitalized like those referring to God ..."

In 1938 Mussolini began reasserting his anti-clericalism. He would sometimes refer to himself as an "outright disbeliever", and once told his cabinet that "Islam was perhaps a more effective religion than Christianity" and that the "papacy was a malignant tumor in the body of Italy and must 'be rooted out once and for all', because there was no room in Rome for both the Pope and himself". He publicly backed down from these anti-clerical statements, but continued making similar statements in private.

After his fall from power in 1943, Mussolini began speaking "more about God and the obligations of conscience", although "he still had little use for the priests and sacraments of the Church". He also began drawing parallels between himself and Jesus. Mussolini's widow, Rachele, stated that her husband had remained "basically irreligious until the later years of his life". Mussolini was given a secular funeral in 1957 when his remains were placed in the family crypt.

== Views on antisemitism and race ==
Mussolini's views and policies regarding Jews and antisemitism were inconsistent, contradictory, and shifted depending on the situation. Historians have labeled him as a political opportunist when it came to the treatment of the Jews rather than following a sincere belief. Mussolini considered Italian Jews to be Italians, but this belief may have been influenced more by his anti-clericalism and the general mood of Italy, which denounced the abusive treatment of the Jews in the Roman Ghetto by the Papal States until the Unification of Italy. Although Mussolini had initially disregarded scientific racism, he was a firm believer in national traits and made generalisations about Jews. Mussolini blamed the Russian Revolution of 1917 on "Jewish vengeance" against Christianity with the remark: "Race does not betray race ... Bolshevism is being defended by the international plutocracy. That is the real truth." He also made an assertion that 80% of Soviet leaders were Jewish. Within a few weeks, he contradicted himself with the remark: "Bolshevism is not, as people believe, a Jewish phenomenon. The truth is that Bolshevism is leading to the utter ruin of the Jews of Eastern Europe."

In the early 1920s, Mussolini stated that Fascism would never raise a "Jewish question" and in an article stated: "Italy knows no antisemitism and we believe that it will never know it...let us hope that Italian Jews will continue to be sensible enough so as not to give rise to antisemitism in the only country where it has never existed". In 1932, Mussolini during a conversation with Emil Ludwig described antisemitism as a "German vice" and stated that "There was 'no Jewish Question' in Italy and could not be one in a country with a healthy system of government." On several occasions, Mussolini spoke positively about Jews and Zionism, although fascism remained suspicious of Zionism after the Fascist Party gained power. In 1934, Mussolini supported the establishment of the Betar Naval Academy in Civitavecchia to train Zionist cadets, arguing that a Jewish state would be in Italy's interest.

Until 1938 Mussolini had denied any antisemitism within the Fascist Party. The relationship between Mussolini and Hitler was a contentious one early on. While Hitler cited Mussolini as an influence and privately expressed admiration for him, Mussolini had little regard for Hitler, especially after the Nazis had his friend and ally, Engelbert Dollfuss, the Austrofascist dictator of Austria, killed in 1934. With the assassination of Dollfuss, Mussolini attempted to distance himself from Hitler by rejecting much of the racialism and antisemitism espoused by the Nazis. Mussolini during this period rejected biological racism, at least in the Nazi sense, and instead emphasised "Italianising" the parts of the Italian Empire he desired to build. He declared that the ideas of eugenics and racially charged concept of an Aryan nation were impossible. Mussolini dismissed the idea of a master race as "arrant nonsense, stupid and idiotic".

When discussing the Nazi decree that Germans must carry a passport with either Aryan or Jewish racial affiliation marked in 1934, Mussolini wondered how they would designate membership in the "Germanic race":

But which race? Does there exist a German race? Has it ever existed? Will it ever exist? Reality, myth, or hoax of the theorists?
Ah well, we respond, a Germanic race does not exist. Various movements. Curiosity. Stupor. We repeat. Does not exist. We don't say so. Scientists say so. Hitler says so.

When German-Jewish journalist Emil Ludwig asked about his views on race in 1933, Mussolini exclaimed:

Race! It is a feeling, not a reality: ninety-five percent, at least, is a feeling. Nothing will ever make me believe that biologically pure races can be shown to exist today. Amusingly enough, not one of those who have proclaimed the "nobility" of the Teutonic race was himself a Teuton. Gobineau was a Frenchman, (Houston Stewart) Chamberlain, an Englishman; Woltmann, a Jew; Lapouge, another Frenchman.

In a speech given in Bari in 1934, he reiterated his attitude towards the German concept of a master race:

Thirty centuries of history allow us to look with supreme pity on certain doctrines which are preached beyond the Alps by the descendants of those who were illiterate when Rome had Caesar, Virgil and Augustus.

Though Italian Fascism varied its official positions on race from the 1920s to 1934, ideologically Italian Fascism did not originally discriminate against the Italian-Jewish community: Mussolini recognised that a small contingent had lived there "since the days of the Kings of Rome" and should "remain undisturbed". There were even some Jews in the National Fascist Party, such as Ettore Ovazza, who in 1935 founded the Jewish Fascist paper La Nostra Bandiera ("Our Flag"). Mussolini reached out to the Muslims in his empire and in the predominantly Arab countries of the Middle East. In 1937, the Muslims of Libya presented Mussolini with the "Sword of Islam" while Fascist propaganda pronounced him as the "Protector of Islam".

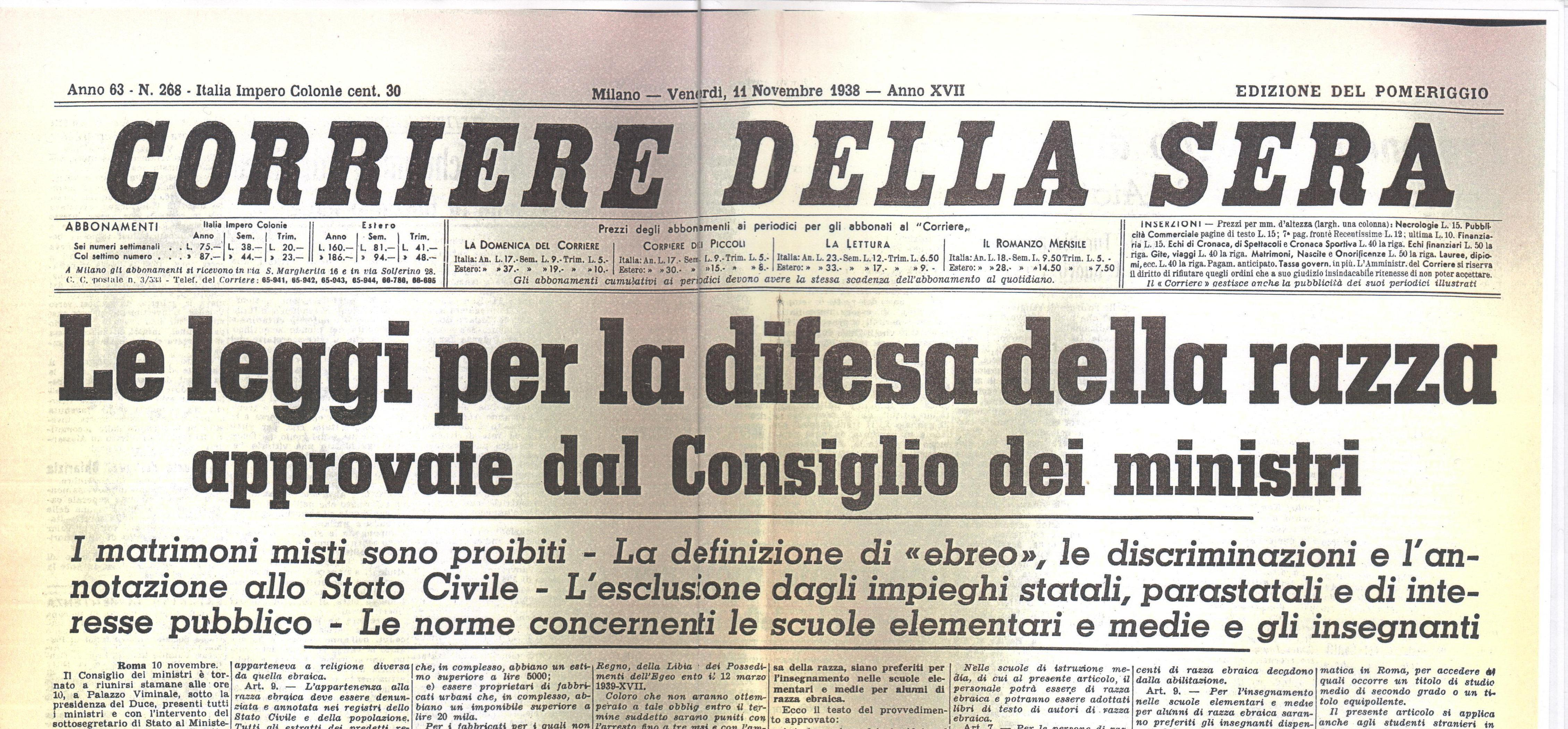
Front page of the Italian newspaper Corriere della Sera on 11 November 1938: the fascist regime has approved the racial laws.

By 1938, the influence Hitler now had over Mussolini became clear with the introduction of the "Manifesto of Race". The Manifesto, closely modelled on the Nazi Nuremberg Laws, stripped Jews of their Italian citizenship and with it any position in the government or professions. The racial laws declared Italians to be part of the Aryan race and forbade sexual relations and marriages between Italians and those considered to be of an "inferior race", chiefly Jews and Africans. Jews were not permitted to own or manage companies involved in military production, or factories that employed over one hundred people or exceeded a certain value. They could not own land over a certain value, serve in the armed forces, employ non-Jewish domestics, or belong to the Fascist party. Their employment in banks, insurance companies, and public schools was forbidden. Mussolini and the Italian military did not consistently apply the laws adopted in the Manifesto of Race. In December 1943, Mussolini made a confession to journalist/politician Bruno Spampanato that seems to indicate that he regretted the Manifesto of Race:

The Racial Manifesto could have been avoided. It dealt with the scientific abstruseness of a few teachers and journalists, a conscientious German essay translated into bad Italian. It is far from what I have said, written and signed on the subject. I suggest that you consult the old issues of Il Popolo d'Italia. For this reason I am far from accepting (Alfred) Rosenberg's myth.

While many historians have explained Mussolini's Manifesto as purely a pragmatic move to gain favour with Italy's ally, others have pointed out that Mussolini, along with other Fascist officials, had encouraged antisemitic sentiment before 1938, such as in response to significant Jewish participation in Giustizia e Libertà, a prominent anti-Fascist organisation. Proponents of this view argue that Mussolini's implementation of these laws reflected a homegrown Italian flavour of antisemitism distinct from that of Nazism, one which perceived Jews as bound to decadence and liberalism and was influenced not just by Fascist ideology but by the Catholic Church.

Even after introduction of the racial laws, Mussolini continued to make contradictory statements about race. Government officials told Jewish representatives that the antisemitism in Fascist Italy would soon be over. Antisemitism was unpopular within the Fascist party; once when a Fascist scholar protested to Mussolini about the treatment of his Jewish friends, Mussolini is reported to have said: "I agree with you entirely. I don't believe a bit in the stupid antisemitic theory. I am carrying out my policy entirely for political reasons." Hitler was disappointed with Mussolini's perceived lack of antisemitism, as was Joseph Goebbels, who once said that "Mussolini appears to have not recognized the Jewish question". Nazi racial theorist Alfred Rosenberg criticised Fascist Italy for its lack of what he defined as a true concept of 'race' and 'Jewishness', while the virulently racist Julius Streicher, writing for the Nazi newspaper Der Stürmer, dismissed Mussolini as a Jewish puppet. Mussolini and the Italian Army in occupied regions openly opposed German efforts to deport Italian Jews to concentration camps. Italy's refusal to comply with German demands of Jewish persecution influenced other countries.

In September 1943 semi-autonomous militarised squads of Fascist fanatics arose throughout the Republic of Salò. These spread terror among Jews for 18 months. In the power vacuum that existed during the first four months of the occupation, the bands were virtually uncontrollable. Many were linked to individual high-ranking Fascist politicians. Italian Fascists, sometimes government employees but more often fanatic civilians or paramilitary volunteers, hastened to gain favour with the Nazis. Informers betrayed their neighbours, squadristi seized Jews and delivered them to the German SS, and Italian journalists seemed to compete in the virulence of their anti-Semitic diatribes.

Despite Mussolini's ostensible disbelief in biological racism, Fascist Italy implemented laws rooted in such notions throughout its colonial empire on his orders. Mussolini believed that black people were inferior to whites. Mussolini saw high birthrates in Africa and Asia as a threat to the "white race". He believed that the US was doomed as the American blacks had a higher birthrate than whites, making it inevitable the blacks would take over the US to drag it down to their level. Mussolini believed blacks were "uncivilised" and stood at the bottom of any hierarchy of achievement. Following the Second Italo-Senussi War, Mussolini directed Marshal Pietro Badoglio to ban miscegenation in Libya, fearing that Italian settlers in the colony would degenerate into "half-castes" if interracial relationships were permitted. During the Second Italo-Ethiopian War, Mussolini forbade his soldiers to sing "Faccetta nera" ("Pretty little black face"), that praised Ethiopian women, and ordered Badoglio to punish any soldier that had sex with a black woman. Mussolini implemented laws mandating strict racial segregation between black Africans and Italians in Italian East Africa. These racist laws were much more rigorous and pervasive than in other European colonies, comparable to South Africa during the Apartheid era. Fascist Italy's segregationism further differed from other European colonies in that its impetus came not from within its colonies, but Mussolini himself. Though many of these laws were ignored by officials due to the difficulty of enforcing them, Mussolini frequently complained to subordinates upon hearing of instances of them being broken and saw the need to micromanage race relations as part of his ideological vision.

== Legacy ==
=== Family ===
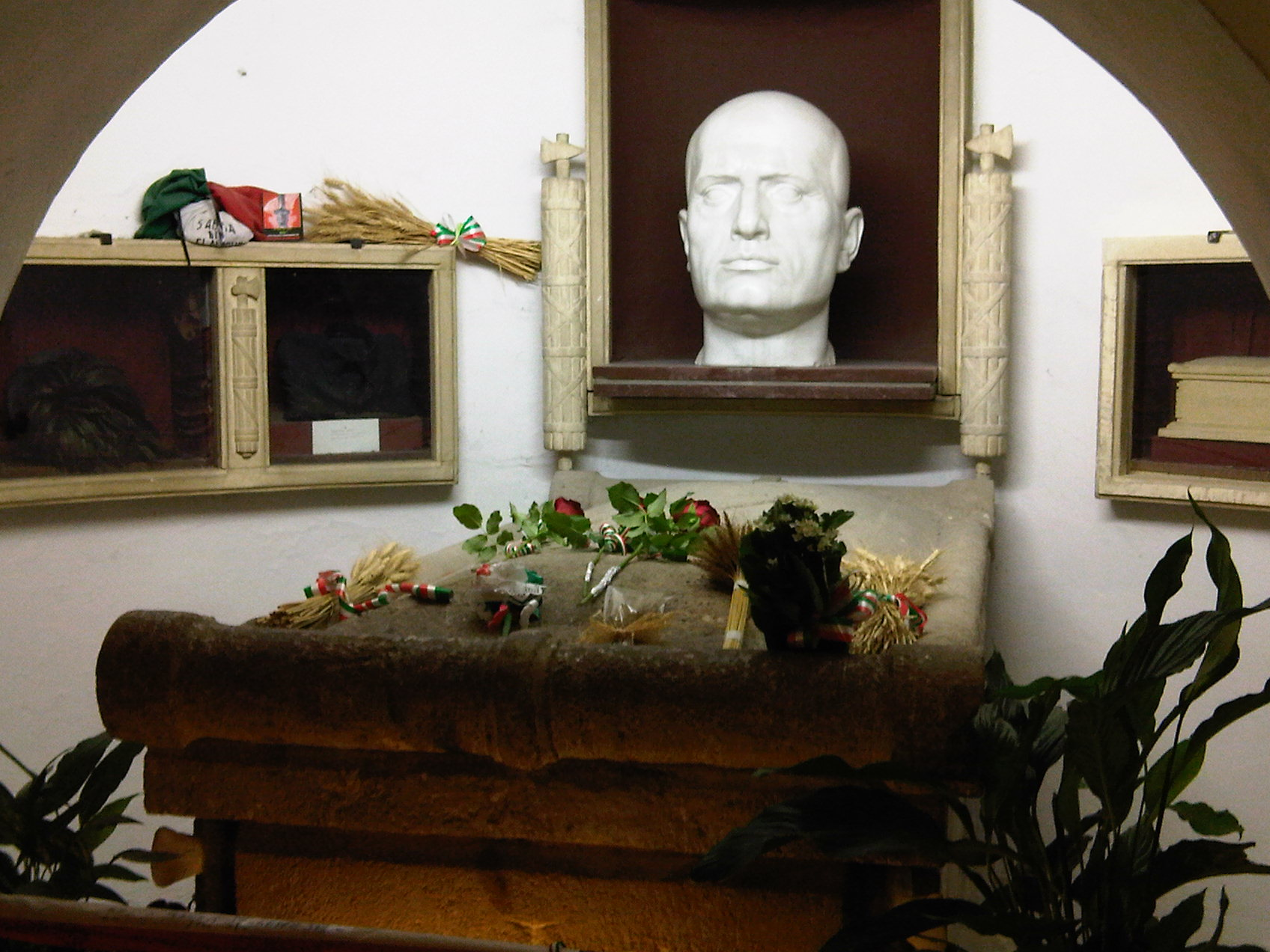
Tomb of Mussolini in the family crypt, in the cemetery of Predappio

Mussolini and his wife, Rachele Mussolini, had three sons (Vittorio, Romano, and Bruno) and two daughters, Edda (the widow of Count Ciano) and Anna Maria. Bruno was killed in an air accident on 7 August 1941.

Alessandra Mussolini, granddaughter of Mussolini, is politically active in Italian right-wing circles. She has been a member of the European Parliament for the far-right Social Alternative movement, a deputy in the Italian lower chamber and served in the Senate as a member of Silvio Berlusconi's Forza Italia party. Her half-sister Rachele Mussolini is also active in politics through Brothers of Italy, the main Italian right-wing party; she is the daughter of Romano and his second wife Carla Maria Puccini. Caio Giulio Cesare Mussolini, a great-grandson of Mussolini through Vittorio, is also active in politics in Brothers of Italy. Alessandra's son, Romano Floriani Mussolini, is a right-back for the Serie A team Lazio.

=== Neo-fascism ===
Mussolini inspired and supported the international spread of fascist movements during the inter-war period. Although the National Fascist Party was outlawed by the postwar Constitution of Italy, a number of successor neo-fascist parties emerged to carry on its legacy. Historically, the largest neo-fascist party was the Italian Social Movement (Movimento Sociale Italiano), which disbanded in 1995 and was replaced by National Alliance, a conservative party that distanced itself from Fascism (its founder, former foreign minister Gianfranco Fini, declared during an official visit to Israel that Fascism was "an absolute evil"). National Alliance and a number of neo-fascist parties were merged in 2009 to create the short-lived People of Freedom party led by then Prime Minister Silvio Berlusconi, which eventually disbanded after the defeat in the 2013 general election. In 2012, many former members of National Alliance joined Brothers of Italy, led by current Prime Minister of Italy, Giorgia Meloni.

=== Public image ===
In February 2018, a poll conducted by the Demos & Pi research institute found that out of the total 1,014 people interviewed, 19% of voters across the Italian political spectrum had a "positive or very positive" opinion of Mussolini, 60% saw him negatively and 21% did not have an opinion.

== Writings ==
- Giovanni Hus, il Veridico (Jan Hus, True Prophet), Rome (1913). Published in America as John Hus (New York: Albert and Charles Boni, 1929). Republished by the Italian Book Co., NY (1939) as John Hus, the Veracious.
- The Cardinal's Mistress (trans. Hiram Motherwell, New York: Albert and Charles Boni, 1928).
- Campo di Maggio (Napoleon: The Hundred Days), a three-act historical play about Napoleon co-written with Giovacchino Forzano, Firenze, G. Barbèra, 1931 (first performed in 1930; translated into English by John Drinkwater, London, Sidgwick & Jackson, 1932).
- Villafranca, a historical play about Camillo Cavour and the Unification of Italy co-written with Giovacchino Forzano, Firenze, G. Barbèra, 1932.
- There is an essay on "The Doctrine of Fascism" written by Benito Mussolini that appeared in the 1932 edition of the Enciclopedia Italiana.
- La Mia Vita ("My Life"), Mussolini's autobiography written upon request of the American Ambassador in Rome (Child). Mussolini, at first not interested, decided to dictate the story of his life to Arnaldo Mussolini, his brother. The story covers the period up to 1929, includes Mussolini's personal thoughts on Italian politics and the reasons that motivated his new revolutionary idea. It covers the march on Rome and the beginning of the dictatorship and includes some of his most famous speeches in the Italian Parliament (Oct 1924, Jan 1925).
- Vita di Arnaldo (Life of Arnaldo), Milano, Il Popolo d'Italia, 1932.
- Scritti e discorsi di Benito Mussolini (Writings and Discourses of Mussolini), 12 volumes, Milano, Hoepli, 1934–1940.
- Four Speeches on the Corporate State, Laboremus, Roma, 1935, p. 38
- Cesare, a historical play about Julius Caesar co-written with Giovacchino Forzano, Firenze, G. Barbèra, 1939.
- Parlo con Bruno (Talks with Bruno), Milano, Il Popolo d'Italia, 1941.
- Storia di un anno. Il tempo del bastone e della carota (History of a Year), Milano, Mondadori, 1944.
- From 1951 to 1962, Edoardo and Duilio Susmel worked for the publisher "La Fenice" to produce Opera Omnia (the complete works) of Mussolini in 35 volumes.

== See also ==
- Fascist syndicalism – Italian trade syndicate movement
- List of covers of Time magazine (1920s)
- Mediterraneanism – Ideology of commonality between Mediterranean cultures
- Order of the Golden Spur – Papal order of knighthood
- Pact of Pacification
- Villa Mussolini – Seaside villa in Riccione, Italy

== Bibliography ==
- Bosworth, R.J.B. (2002). Mussolini. London, Hodder.
- Bosworth, R.J.B. (2006). Mussolini's Italy: Life Under the Dictatorship 1915–1945. London, Allen Lane.
- Caprotti, Federico (2007). Mussolini's Cities: Internal Colonialism in Italy, 1930–1939, Cambria Press.
- Celli, Carlo (2013). Economic Fascism: Primary Sources on Mussolini's Crony Capitalism. Axios Press.
- Corvaja, Santi (2001). Hitler and Mussolini: The Secret Meetings. Enigma. ISBN 1-929631-00-6
- Daldin, Rudolph S. The Last Centurion. www.benito-mussolini.com Archived 23 April 2020 at the Wayback Machine ISBN 0-921447-34-5
- De Felice, Renzo (1965). Mussolini. Il Rivoluzionario,1883–1920 (in Italian) (1 ed.). Torino: Einaudi.
- De Felice, Renzo (1966). Mussolini. Il Fascista. 1: La conquista del potere, 1920–1925 (in Italian) (1 ed.). Torino: Einaudi.
- De Felice, Renzo (1969). Mussolini. Il Fascista. 2: L'organizzazione dello Stato fascista, 1925–1929 (in Italian) (1 ed.). Torino: Einaudi.
- De Felice, Renzo (1974). Mussolini. Il Duce. 1: Gli anni del consenso, 1929–1936 (in Italian) (1 ed.). Torino: Einaudi.
- De Felice, Renzo (1981). Mussolini. Il Duce. 2: Lo stato totalitario, 1936–1940 (in Italian) (1 ed.). Torino: Einaudi.
- De Felice, Renzo (1990). Mussolini. L'Alleato, 1940–1942. 1: L'Italia in guerra I. Dalla "guerra breve" alla guerra lunga (in Italian) (1 ed.). Torino: Einaudi.
- De Felice, Renzo (1990). Mussolini. L'Alleato. 1: L'Italia in guerra II: Crisi e agonia del regime (in Italian) (1 ed.). Torino: Einaudi.
- De Felice, Renzo (1997). Mussolini. L'Alleato. 2: La guerra civile, 1943–1945 (in Italian) (1 ed.). Torino: Einaudi.
- Farrell, Nicholas (2003). Mussolini: A New Life. London: Phoenix Press, ISBN 1-84212-123-5.
- Garibaldi, Luciano (2004). Mussolini: The Secrets of his Death. Enigma. ISBN 1-929631-23-5
- Golomb, Jacob; Wistrich, Robert S. (1 September 2002). Nietzsche, Godfather of Fascism?: On the Uses and Abuses of a Philosophy. Princeton, New Jersey: Princeton University Press. ISBN 978-0-691-00710-6.
- Gregor, Anthony James (1979). Young Mussolini and the Intellectual Origins of Fascism. Berkeley and Los Angeles, California; London, England: University of California Press. ISBN 978-0520037991.
- Hibbert, Christopher. Il Duce.
- Haugen, Brenda (2007). Benito Mussolini: Fascist Italian Dictator. Minneapolis, MN: Compass Point Books. ISBN 978-0-7565-1988-9.
- Kallis, Aristotle A. (2000). Fascist Ideology: Territory and Expansionism in Italy and Germany, 1922-1945. London: Routledge. ISBN 978-0-415-21612-8.
- Kroener, Bernhard R.; Muller, Rolf-Dieter; Umbreit, Hans (2003). Germany and the Second World War Organization and Mobilization in the German Sphere of Power. Vol. VII. New York: Oxford University Press, Inc. ISBN 978-0-19-820873-0.
- Lowe, Norman. Italy, "1918–1945: the first appearance of fascism" in Mastering Modern World History.
- Mack Smith, Denis (1982). Mussolini. New York: Alfred A. Knopf. ISBN 0-394-50694-4.
- Mack Smith, Denis (1997). Modern Italy. Ann Arbor, Mich: University of Michigan Press. ISBN 978-0-472-10895-4.
- Morris, Terry; Murphy, Derrick. Europe 1870–1991.
- Moseley, Ray (2004). Mussolini: The Last 600 Days of Il Duce. Taylor Trade. ISBN 978-1-58979-095-7.
- Mussolini, Rachele (1977) [1974]. Mussolini: An Intimate Biography. Pocket Books. Originally published by William Morrow, ISBN 0-671-81272-6, LCCN 74-1129
- Neville, Peter (2014). Mussolini. Routledge. doi:10.4324/9781315750736. ISBN 978-1-315-75073-6.
- O'Brien, Paul (2004). Mussolini in the First World War: The Journalist, the Soldier, the Fascist. Oxford: Berg Publishers.
- Painter Jr., Borden W. (2005). Mussolini's Rome: Rebuilding the Eternal City.
- Passannanti, Erminia, Mussolini nel cinema italiano Passione, potere egemonico e censura della memoria. Un'analisi metastorica del film di Marco Bellocchio Vincere!, 2013. ISBN 978-1-4927-3723-0
- Pearson, Owen (2004). Albania in the Twentieth Century, A History. Vol. I - Albania and King Zog. The Centre for Albanian Studies / I.B.Tauris. ISBN 978-184511013-0.
- Petacco, Arrigo, ed. (1998). L'archivio segreto di Mussolini. Mondadori. ISBN 88-04-44914-4.
- Shirer, William L. (1960). The Rise and Fall of the Third Reich. New York: Simon & Schuster. LCCN 60-6729.
- Sternhell, Zeev; Sznajder, Mario; Asheri, Maia (1994). The Birth of Fascist Ideology: From Cultural Rebellion to Political Revolution. Princeton, NJ: Princeton University Press. ISBN 978-0-691-04486-6.
- Stang, G. Bruce (1999). "War and peace: Mussolini's road to Munich". In Lukes, Igor; Goldstein, Erik (eds.). The Munich Crisis 1938: Prelude to World War II. London: Frank Cass. pp. 160–90.
- Tucker, Spencer (2005). Encyclopedia of World War I: A Political, Social, and Military History. Santa Barbara, California: ABC-CLIO.
- Weinberg, Gerhard (2005). A World in Arms. Cambridge: Cambridge University Press.
- Zuccotti, Susan (1987). Italians and the Holocaust Basic Books, Inc.

=== Historiography ===
- O'Brien, Paul. 2004. Mussolini in the First World War: The Journalist, the Soldier, the Fascist. O'Brien evaluates the biographies in Italian and English in the Introduction.

Political offices
Preceded by Luigi Facta	Prime Minister of Italy; 1922–1943	Succeeded by Pietro Badoglio
Preceded by Paolino Taddei; Luigi Federzoni	Minister of the Interior; 1922–1924; 1926–1943	Succeeded by Luigi Federzoni; Bruno Fornaciari
Preceded by Antonino Di Giorgio; Pietro Gazzera	Minister of War; 1925–1929; 1933–1943	Succeeded by Pietro Gazzera; Antonio Sorice
Preceded by Paolo Thaon di Revel; Giuseppe Sirianni	Minister of the Navy; 1925–1929; 1933–1943	Succeeded by Giuseppe Sirianni; Raffaele de Courten
Preceded by New title Italo Balbo	Minister of Aeronautics; 1925–1929; 1933–1943	Succeeded by Italo Balbo; Renato Sandalli
Preceded by Luigi Federzoni; Emilio De Bono; Alessandro Lessona	Minister of the Italian Africa; 1928–1929; 1935–1936; 1937–1939	Succeeded by Emilio De Bono; Alessandro Lessona; Attilio Teruzzi
Preceded by Carlo Schanzer; Dino Grandi; Galeazzo Ciano	Minister of Foreign Affairs; 1922–1929; 1932–1936; 1943	Succeeded by Dino Grandi; Galeazzo Ciano; Raffaele Guariglia
New title	Duce of the Italian Social Republic; 1943–1945	Abolished
New title	Minister of Foreign Affairs; 1943–1945	Abolished
Party political offices
New title	Duce of Fascism; 1919–1943	Abolished
New title	Duce of the Republican Fascist Party; 1943–1945	Abolished
Military offices
New title	First Marshal of the Empire; 1938–1943	Abolished
