= Fascist mysticism =

School of thought in Fascist Italy

Fascist mysticism (Italian: Mistica fascista) was a current of political and religious thought in Fascist Italy, based on Fideism, a belief that faith existed without reason, and that Fascism should be based on a mythology and spiritual mysticism. A School of Fascist Mysticism was founded in Milan on April 10, 1930. Active until 1943, its main objective was the training of future Fascist leaders who were indoctrinated in the study of various Fascist intellectuals who tried to abandon the purely political to create a spiritual understanding of Fascism. Fascist mysticism in Italy developed through the work of Niccolò Giani with the decisive support of Arnaldo Mussolini.

== Definition ==
Niccolò Giani took the definition of mysticism from the writing of French philosopher Louis Rougier:

Mysticism is a set of propositions which adheres to tradition or sentiment, even if these propositions cannot be justified rationally and very often forgetting the primary reasons that led to state them.

— Louis Rougier in Niccolò Giani in La marcia sul mondo, October 9-October 15, 1932

In line with Rougier, Giani stressed in his manifesto for the School of Fascist Mysticism, "that fascism has its 'mystical' aspect, as it postulates a complex of moral, social and political, categorical and dogmatic beliefs, accepted and not questioned by the masses and minorities ... [A Fascist] puts his belief in the infallible Duce Benito Mussolini, the fascist and creator of civilization; [a Fascist] denies that anything outside of the Duce has spiritual or putative antecedents."

The establishment of the School was made to allow his followers to devote themselves fully to the worship of Mussolini, meditating on the writings and speeches of Mussolini, and living according to his words, in a spirit of absolute loyalty and unquestioningly, as specified in the article "Fascist mysticism" in the Political Dictionary edited by the National Fascist Party in 1940:

In this sense "mystical fascism" means belief in the absolute truth of the doctrine established by the Duce and the same belief in the necessity of this doctrine, as a way of greatness and power of the nation (...). With this fascist mysticism is called the preparation for more energetic action and more on which the ideals of Fascist statements tend to translate into reality ... The mystical fascism ... can best be described as the Fascist action determined by a stronger faith in the absolute truth of Fascist propositions. In this sense we can understand how one can speak of a mystical part of the Fascist doctrine or the best of the doctrine of Fascism, and how to prepare a school that is appropriate and addresses the best part of the Italian youth towards this mysticism, that is, towards this "more fascist" action.

— From the Dictionary of Politics, edited by the National Fascist Party, Vol III, p. 185 to 186, Rome 1940

The use of the term "mysticism" provoked hostility from the Roman Catholic Church, which used the term in the sense of being strictly limited to the spiritual sphere, without any political influence. But in Giani's conception of mysticism, he claimed it was in the political sphere without fear of overlap between the two worlds. Giani stated: "Neither the Church should make policy, nor the State must make religion. Fascist Catholics, therefore, Catholics, or fascists, whichever is more like it, but Fascists: let us remember." The Bishop Onofrio Buonocore stated that he viewed Fascist mysticism as "the testimony of an Italy no longer divided, but renewed and reconciled under the papal insignia and littoriali". In February 1937, the Cardinal of Milan, Ildefonso Schuster, gave a speech at the School of Fascist Mysticism. Many years of friction took place between the Catholic Church and the Fascist Regime, erupting into open conflict in 1931, after Mussolini's withdrawal of several concessions his regime made to the Catholic Church in a 1929 Concordat.

== The protagonists ==
While considering the Fascist mysticism a "trend of thought" there are only contributions made by Italian thinkers, although they quoted Rougier, Albert Sorel and Henri Bergson, cited by Nino Tripodi even if they were important in predetermining a state of mind in young mystics rather than provide guidance. According to the philosopher Enzo Paci, Fascist mysticism was influenced by Nietzsche and Sorel, as was much of the culture of the period:

Nietzsche and Sorel have been and remain the true masters of our culture, that of our political doctrine.

— Enzo Paci

The principles of mystical fascism were largely formulated by Niccolò Giani and a small group of young Fascists bound to the teachers at the School of Fascist Mysticism (including Guido Pallotta and Berto Ricci), some high-ranking (including Ferdinando Mezzasoma, Giuseppe Bottai), by writers and journalists of proven Fascist faith (Telesio Interlandi, Virginio Gayda) and Benito Mussolini. It ultimately traced the cultural lines that were followed in the development of "Fascist" disciplines and guidelines pertaining to the policies of the School of Fascist Mysticism. Around this core of "hard" high-profile intellectuals revolved others, including Paolo Orano, Luigi Stefanini (who was an official consultant to the School of Fascist Mysticism) and Julius Evola, and Giovanni Gentile and his student and friend Armando Carlini, but Carlini seems to have had a rather marginal role in Fascist "mysticism".

== See also ==
- National mysticism
- Occultism and the far right
