= School of Fascist Mysticism =

Political movement

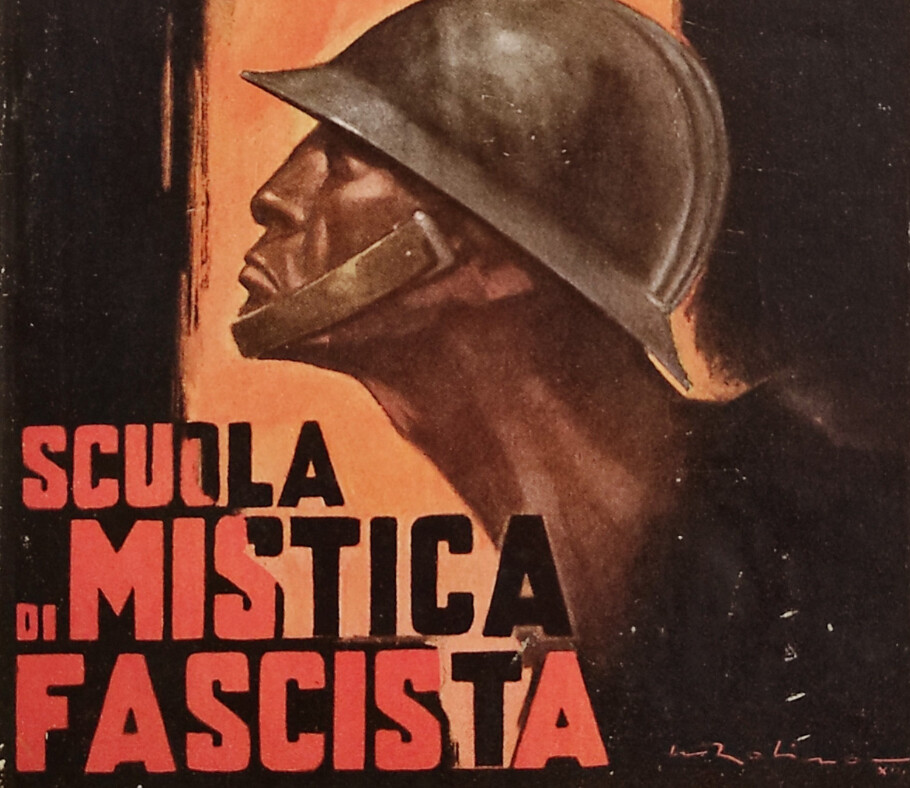
Title page of a pamphlet dedicated to the memory of Ugo Pepe, published by the School of Fascist Mysticism.

The Sandro Italico Mussolini School of Fascist Mysticism (Italian: Scuola di mistica fascista Sandro Italico Mussolini) was established in Milan, Italy in 1930 by Niccolò Giani. Its primary goal was to train the future leaders of Italy's National Fascist Party. The school curriculum promoted Fascist mysticism based on the philosophy of Fideism, the belief that faith and reason were incompatible; Fascist mythology was to be accepted as a "metareality". In 1932, Mussolini described Fascism as "a religious concept of life", saying that Fascists formed a "spiritual community".

== School ==
=== Founding ===
The school was founded through the efforts of Niccolò Giani and the Milan Gruppo Universitario Fascista, a youth wing of the National Fascist Party for university students. It was formed on April 10, 1930, at the Casa del Fascio (Fascist House) at piazza Belgioioso (Belgioioso Square), part of the Istituto Fascista di Cultura (Fascist Institute of Culture). Leo Pollini presided at the meeting. These two organizations had the right to choose the nominal director.

Giani anticipated the opening on April 4, in an article in the GUF newspaper "Libro e moschetto" (Book and Musket) The School of Fascist Mysticism was founded that same Spring in Milan, under the patronage of Benito Mussolini's brother, Arnaldo Mussolini, and in the presence of Catholic Cardinal Alfredo Ildefonso Schuster.

The Milanese institution was first located in San Francesco d'Assisi Street to gather its first staff members, and held its first directors' meeting on April 10, in the casa del fascio (Fascist House) in piazza Belgioioso (Belgioioso Square). Several active Fascist Party members participated, including the Secretary of the GUF, Andrea Ippoliti. Giani explained the objectives of the creation of the school were not to create a duplicate of one of the many organizations of the regime, but to achieve a complete education for students enrolled in GUF.

=== Headquarters at via Pellico ===
Following its relocation via Silvio Pellico (Pellico Street), the school was named Sandro Italico Mussolini, on November 29, 1931. On the same day, Arnaldo Mussolini gave the speech "Coscienza e dovere" (Conscience and Duty), launching the school year, and providing the blueprint for the fundamental principles, or rules, of the school, expanded by Giani later. From October 9 to October 15, 1932, Niccolò Giani wrote a type of program manifesto, establishing the founding principles of the School:

Our task must focus only on coordinating, interpreting and processing the thought of the Duce. That's because it is a sort of mystical Fascist school and here is its task: to develop and specify the new values that are in the Fascist work of Mussolini.

The school proposed the goal of reviving the spirit of Fascism, the battlefield trench (recalling Italy's role in World War I) and the first years of the movement, delivered ideally through a new generation. proposed in particular to be the center of political education for future leaders of Italian Fascism. The key principles on which the teaching was based were: voluntary activism; faith in Italy, from which it was believed faither in Benito Mussolini and Fascism derived; anti-rationalism; a mixture of religion and politics; teachings against liberal democracy (constitutional democracy) and socialism; and a cult of Ancient Rome (romanità).

Giani was made the school's first director, and the school's first president was Vito Mussolini, Benito Mussolini's nephew. Ferdinando Mezzasoma was made vice-president. Luigi Stefanini acted as an official "consultant" to the school for many years. In via Pellico, they had several offices, where it was easier to organize their work space, and inside they kept around five thousand volumes, mainly about Fascism but also other publications, such as a collection of issues by the socialist newspaper L'Avanti published by the Confederazione Generale del Lavoro (General Labour Confederation). Numerous courses were given on a variety of subjects. The School's main activity was organizing conventions and conferences on issues related to Fascism. Courses covered a range of topics, but mainly focused on Fascism.

The school became the editor of a series of books dealing with different issues. From 1937, under the initiative of Giani, the school published a magazine, Dottrina fascista (Fascist Doctrine), and in 1939 published the "Decalogo dell'italiano nuovo", (New Italian Decalogue (Ten Commandments)), written and delivered as a speech by Arnaldo Mussolini, brother of Benito Mussolini.

=== Acquisition of the "Covo" (Cave) ===
In 1939, during a ceremony presided over by Achille Starace, secretary of the National Fascist Party, the official headquarters moved to the offices that housed Mussolini's newspaper Il Popolo d'Italia during its infancy, called "il Covo" (the Cave). The "Covo" over the years had been transformed into a permanent museum of the Fascist Revolution, and since November 15, 1939 the entire building had been declared a "national monument" with an "honour guard" made of fighters from the squadrismo (squadristi) and veterans. On November 20, by an explicit decision by Mussolini, it was officially handed over to the students of the school, at an event that was conducted as a consecration of Giani's students, reunited around him. In reality the transition had been ordered on October 18, 1939, as shown on the sheet of orders of the National Fascist Party from that date, at which time the Board had been received in Rome by Mussolini. Mussolini had encouraged them to continue their activities.

Fascism must have its missionaries, that is, men who know how to convey the uncompromising faith and fight to the ultimate sacrifice for their faith. Every revolution has three stages: it begins with the mystical, it continues with the policy, you end up with the administration. When a revolution becomes an administration, one can say it's over, liquidated ...

The School of Fascist Mysticism's directors intended to use the old location of "Il Popolo d'Italia" to turn it into a "Shrine of the Fascist Revolution", by creating displays with Fasci italiani di combattimento and early years of Fascism memorabilia on the first floor. On the second and third floors, memorabilia and documents relating to the years leading up to the 1922 March on Rome were to be displayed, and finally the most recent years were to be exhibited on the fourth floor.

== Conflict with the Catholic Church ==
In 1929, Mussolini signed a Lateran Pact with the Roman Catholic Church. Intended to set down the rights of the Catholic Church in Italy, it was signed one year before the founding of the School of Fascist Mysticism. The religious component recalls the experiments in government-created religions during the French Revolution: Joseph Fouché's attempts to install a Cult of Reason, and Maximilien Robespierre's attempts to install a Cult of the Supreme Being, during the Reign of Terror. Fouché and Robespierre had the goal of eliminating the Roman Catholic Church in France and replacing it with a secular, state-organized religion. Mussolini denied that this was the goal of Fascist mysticism, or that it in any way represented a conflict with Roman Catholicism. At the time, nearly all Italians belonged to Roman Catholic Church, and the Pope was Italian and Bishop of Rome. The Catholic Church ran nearly all schools, hospitals, and many other institutions in Italy, and was powerful around the world. Shortly after the founding of the School of Fascist Mysticism, Mussolini began suppression of Catholic organizations, including the laypersons' Azione Cattolica organization, deemed to be interfering in the cultural and social activities under the control of the state. In 1931, the Pope was compelled to issue a public, formal papal encyclical, Non abbiamo bisogno, denouncing the "pagan idolatry of the state" being introduced to Italy by Mussolini.

In a 1934 interview with French newspaper Le Figaro, Mussolini stated, "In the Fascist concept of the totalitarian state, religion is absolutely free, and, in its own sphere, independent. The crazy idea of founding a new religion of the state or of subordinating to the state the religion of all Italians has never entered our minds". On the other hand, Mussolini also stated in the same interview that "the Fascist state could ... intervene in religious affairs ... only when the latter touch the political and moral order of the state". Fascist philosopher Giovanni Gentile had maintained that Fascism could contradict Catholicism.

== 10th anniversary of the School ==
During February 19 to 20 in Milan, to mark the 10th anniversary of the founding of the School, the "First National Conference of Mystical Fascists" was held in a room at the palazzo Marino (Marino Palace), with the intention that it would be the first in a series of such conferences. This objective failed with the start of World War II. Ferdinando Mezzasoma presided at the Conference, as the Deputy Secretary of the School and the National Fascist Party. The theme of the Conference was, "Why are we Mystics?"

The meeting saw some 500 participants, among them most Italian intellectuals of the time, including deans and professors. Julius Evola was among the supporters of this initiative for the possibilities it could offer in the creation of an elite inspired by the traditional values he espoused. Numerous discussions were reported and published as "Notebooks" under the initiative of Giani.

== The "Mystics" volunteer for the war front ==
After the entry of Italy into World War II on June 10, 1940, the School was entrusted to the regency of Salvatore Atzeni, and classes were suspended, in large part because most directors had left voluntarily under the instigation of Niccolò Giani. Giani was killed during the war in 1941, as were many other instructors from the School, including Guido Pallotta and Berto Ricci. In 1943, having lost most of its instructors in the war, the School's activities ceased.

By the time Italy's participation in World War II was ended by the Armistice between Italy and Allied armed forces, 14 members of the school were killed, four of whom were decorated with Italy's Silver Medal of Military Valor.

== Instructors ==
Among the teachers at the school, there were:

- Vito Mussolini (president)
- Ferdinando Mezzasoma (vice president)
- Niccolò Giani (director)
- Guido Pallotta
- Berto Ricci
- Emilio Bodrero
- Eugenio Coselschi
- Asvero Gravelli
- Umberto Padovani
- Enzo Paci
- Giorgio Pini
- Nino Tripodi
- Cornelio di Marzio
- Giuseppe Pagano Pogatschnig
- Gastone Silvano Spinetti
- Pasquale Pennisi
- Michele Federico Sciacca
- Enzo Leoni
- Julius Evola
- Luigi Stefanini
- Amintore Fanfani

== Curriculum ==
The School of Fascist Mysticism has been the subject of limited research. Some eminent scholars have traced the brief notes and put them in works of broader scope: Bobbio, Casucci, Isnenghi, Nolte, De Felice, Gentile, Ledeen Greater depth was instead shown by Daniele Marchesini, Betri, Signori, La Rovere, journalists of the caliber of Bocca, de Antonellis and Giannantoni. The first to show interest in the topic was, from the political spectrum's right, the political scientist Marco Tarchi. while Marchesini goes to the record of having been the only, until 2003, to have an entire study devoted to this subject. By 2004 blooms a certain interest in Fascist Mysticism: there are published, without the knowledge of the other one, two works: L. Fantini, Essenza mistica del fascismo totalitario. Dalla scuola di Mistica Fascista alle Brigate Nere a cura dell'Associazione Culturale 1 dicembre 1943, Perugia 2004 and A. Grandi Gli eroi di Mussolini. Niccolò Giani e la Scuola di Mistica Fascista, Rizzoli, Milano 2004.

== Bibliography of authors connected with the School ==
- AA.VV. Quaderni della Scuola di Mistica Fascista Sandro Italico Mussolini, Roma, Dottrina Fascista, anni 1938–1942
- AA.VV. Lineamenti su l'ordinamento sociale dello stato fascista, Giuffré, Milano, 1937
- Armando Carlini, Saggio sul pensiero filosofico e religioso del Fascismo, Roma, Ist. Naz. di Cultura Fascista (Biblioteca I.N.C.F.; 2), 1942
- Julius Evola, Tre aspetti del problema ebraico, Roma, Ed. Mediterranee, 1936
- Julius Evola, La scuola di Mistica Fascista - Scritti su mistica, ascesi e libertà 1940–1941, Napoli, Controcorrente Edizioni - Fondazione Julius Evola, 2009
- Julius Evola, Il mito del sangue, Milano, Hoepli, 1937
- Julius Evola, Indirizzi per una educazione razziale, Napoli, Conte Ed., 1941
- Julius Evola, Sintesi di dottrina della razza, Milano, Hoepli, 1941
- Niccolò Giani, Perché siamo antisemiti, SMF, Milano, 1939-XVII
- Niccolò Giani, La mistica come dottrina del fascismo, SMF, Milano, 1939-XVII
- Niccolò Giani, Perché siamo dei mistici, SMF, Milano, 1940-XVIII
- Niccolò Giani, Mistica della Rivoluzione Fascista, Il Cinabro, Catania, 2010
- Ferdinando Mezzasoma, Introduzione al primo Convegno Nazionale, SMF, Milano, 1940-XVIII
- Paolo Orano, Gli ebrei in Italia, Roma, Pinciana, 1937
- Giorgio Pini, Il covo di Via Paolo da Cannobio. 15 novembre 1914 – 15 novembre 1920, SMF, Milano, 1932-X
- Gastone Silvano Spinetti, Mistica Fascista nel pensiero di Arnaldo Mussolini, Hoepli, Milano, 1936-XIV. Fascismo e libertà (verso una nuova sintesi), Cedam, Padova, 1940-XVIII
