= Berto Ricci =

Italian poet, writer and journalist

- Born: 21 May 1905; Florence, Kingdom of Italy
- Died: 21 February 1941 (aged 35); Barce, Libya
- Cause of death: Killed in action
- Education: University of Florence
- Occupations: Writer, journalist

Roberto Ricci, known as Berto Ricci (21 May 1905 – 21 February 1941) was an Italian Fascist writer, journalist and poet. One of the foremost Fascist intellectuals, he wrote for Il Popolo d'Italia, Il Selvaggio, Primato and Critica fascista as well as for his own magazine, L'Universale, which he founded in 1931. He was also a teacher at the School of Fascist Mysticism.

== Biography ==
After graduating in mathematics and physics at the University of Florence in 1926, Ricci became a professor of these disciplines in Florence itself, Prato and Palermo. In his youth he was attracted to anarchism, but in 1927, the year in which he carried out his military service, he started developing an interest towards Fascism, joining the National Fascist Party in 1932. During the 1930s he dialogued or collaborated with intellectuals such as Indro Montanelli (of whom he became a close friend), Giuseppe Bottai, Julius Evola, Ernesto De Martino, Romano Bilenchi, Ottone Rosai, and Aldo Palazzeschi. Drawing from his anarchist background, Ricci proposed his own version of fascism, one with a strong social imprint and uncompromising towards the bourgeoisie; he became the advocate of "a future Italian modernity, the very first condition of our national power" and the affirmator a "civil tradition, enriched with millenary Christianity but substantially and robustly pagan". Severely condemning classism, he had no qualms in saying that he looked positively or, at least, in a non-a priori negative way at the Bolshevism: "Russia did good for itself with the Communist revolution [...] The anti-Rome exists but it is not Moscow. Against Rome, the city of the soul, stands Chicago, the capital of the pig".

Ricci invoked a "perpetual revolution" that would fight those who had found a place in the regime despite having a substantially a-fascist or even anti-fascist mentality, bringing there, according to him, a bourgeois mentality extraneous to the spirit of the "Fascist revolution". A battle against the "English from the inside" was to be fought contemporarily to that aimed at "the English from the outside". In philosophy, Ricci opposed Giovanni Gentile's idealism, and on 10 January 1933 he published a "Realist Manifesto" which aroused the interest of Julius Evola.

In 1931 Ricci had founded the cultural magazine L'Universale, which met with rapid success; Benito Mussolini himself took great interest in his magazine, and invited Ricci to collaborate with his newspaper, Il Popolo d'Italia, in which Ricci wrote in a column called Bazar. In the summer of 1934 he was invited by the Duce to Palazzo Venezia, where Mussolini asked Ricci for explanations on his anti-idealist critique and on his past anarchism. The positions of L'Universale, which were in some matters close to the left, were criticized by Roberto Farinacci, who saw in them an attack on property rights and accused Ricci of "Bolshevism". The last issue of L'Universale came out on 25 August 1935, after which Ricci volunteered for the Second Italo-Ethiopian War and ceased publications.

In 1940 he participated in the first national conference of the School of Fascist Mysticism, arguing that "fascist mysticism constantly proposes to the Party, the Militia, the State Bodies, the Regime Institutes, the theme of social unity, a dynamic unity that is not limited to economic assistance and the improvement of the conditions of workers – in short, to a demophilic practice –, but focuses on the civilization of work, tending to achieve a higher morality and at the same time a greater collective return (governance of production and consumption, gradual redistribution of wealth, reclamation and autarchy, the worker made into a business partner and co-responsible for the company, the worker made owner) and for this reason, like every mystic called to work concretely on history and to erect lasting foundations, it also satisfies rational requirements".

After the outbreak of the Second World War, Ricci volunteered in the Royal Italian Army, participating in the North African campaign as a Lieutenant in the 26th Artillery Regiment, part of the 17th Infantry Division Pavia. In January 1941 he wrote to his parents: "I always think of my two boys with pride and enthusiasm. We are here for them too, so that these little ones may live in a less thieving world; and so that we may do away with the English and their worthy brothers from overseas, but also with some Englishmen from Italy". In the morning of 2 February 1941, Ricci was killed when his platoon was strafed near Bir Gandula, Libya, by a Supermarine Spitfire. He was posthumously awarded the Bronze Medal of Military Valor; his remains were later repatriated and buried in the Memorial to the Fallen Overseas in Bari.
