= Niccolò Giani =

Italian journalist and philosopher

- Born: 20 June 1909; Muggia, Austro-Hungarian Empire
- Died: 14 March 1941 (aged 31); Mali i Shëndëllisë, Albania
- Cause of death: Killed in action
- Education: University of Florence
- Occupations: Journalist, philosopher

Niccolò Giani (20 June 1909 – 14 March 1941) was an Italian Fascist philosopher and journalist who was the founder of Fascist mysticism.

== Biography ==
After attending the "Dante Alighieri" High School in Trieste he moved to Milan, where in 1928 he enrolled in the Faculty of Law, graduating in 1931. While at the University of Milan he also joined the Fascist University Groups (GUF). On 4 April 1930 Giani announced the imminent founding of the School of Fascist Mysticism, which he opened in Milan a few weeks later along with Arnaldo Mussolini. In 1931 Giani became director of the school, a post he left at the end of the following year due to internal conflicts with the political secretary of the GUF as well as the failure to move the school to the old headquarters of Il Popolo d'Italia, known as "Il covo" ("The Lair"), one of the most important settings of the fascist imaginary, as he complained in a letter to Mussolini.

Giani then continued to collaborate with various newspapers, such as Il Popolo d'Italia and Gerarchia. According to his thought, Fascism had to return to its origins, that is to the revolutionary movement of 1919, ideally linked to the experience of the first squadristi and the Arditi of the Great War; "a more radical revolution combined with the recovery of a more fundamentalist tradition". More than the political statements of the Sansepolcro manifesto, however, Giani exalted the struggle of young people against the bourgeoisie in the early postwar period; Fascist mysticism considered itself the representative of this youthful world inspired by the love of country, a guard of the permanent revolution in contrast with the opportunists and careerists. He identified four main mystics in the contemporary era, destined to bring benefits at first but then to fail: liberalism, democracy, socialism and communism. According to him, "Liberalism, democracy, socialism and communism are the four mystics currently dominating in modern society. The balance - we have already seen - is negative for all. Liberalism leads to anarchy, democracy to political and social instability, socialism to civil struggle, communism to primitive life. These four mystics are therefore anti-historical." Faced with them, the only mysticism capable of overcoming these crises was the fascist one, whose knowledge and dissemination among the masses was the task of the intellectual elites.

In 1934, his essay "Outlines on the Social Order of the State" resulted in him obtaining the post of free lecturer in labor law and social security and then the chair of History and Doctrine of Fascism at the University of Pavia; in 1935, however, after having married Maria Rosa Sampietro, he volunteered for the Second Italo-Ethiopian War by enlisting with the rank of capomanipolo (lieutenant) of the Voluntary Militia for National Security in the 128th Blackshirt Battalion "Vercelli". After returning from Ethiopia, in late 1936 Giani returned to the position of director of the School of Fascist Mysticism, resuming the publication of the "Notebooks of the school of Fascist mysticism", dealing with various issues; in 1937 he founded a monthly magazine, Dottrina fascista (Fascist Doctrine), which became the official magazine of the School of Fascist Mysticism, in which in 1939 he published the "Decalogue of the new Italian", taken from the writings and speeches of Arnaldo Mussolini.

He also devoted himself to journalism, becoming director of the newspaper Cronaca prealpina in Varese and collaborating with various newspapers, including Tempo di Mussolini. In 1938 he was among the signatories of the Manifesto of Race, supporting the proclamation of the Italian Racial Laws, and in 1939 he took part in the anti-Jewish campaign from the pages of Cronaca prealpina, based on his own convictions of "spiritual racism", complementary to the Nazi "biological racism"; in 1939 he published the article "Why we are anti-Semites".

In 1939, after long pressuring by Giani, the official seat of the School of Fascist Mysticism moved to "Il Covo", with a ceremony presided over by the secretary of the PNF Achille Starace. Over the years the "Covo" had been transformed into a permanent museum of the Fascist Revolution, and starting from 15 November 1939 the entire building had been proclaimed a "national monument" complete with an "honor guard" made of squadrists and war veterans. Between 19 and 20 February 1940, on the occasion of the tenth anniversary of the school's foundation, Giani organized the "National Convention of Fascist Mystic" in Milan, which in his intentions should have been the first of a series, but none followed due to Italy’s entry into World War II.

Like most of the "mystics", Giani again enlisted as a volunteer, this time in the 11th Alpini Regiment; he saw the war as the harbinger of a revolution that would lead to a new era. In June 1940 he took part in the battle of the Western Alps against France, being awarded a Silver Medal of Military Valor for an action carried out on June 24, 1940. After the Armistice of Villa Incisa Giani returned to civilian life, but in the meantime the war in North Africa had begun; he repeatedly requested to be sent to the new front as a volunteer, but without success. Finally, on 9 November 1940 he was able to leave for North Africa as war correspondent of Il Popolo d'Italia, Cronaca Prealpina and L'Illustrazione Italiana, attached to the units of the Regia Aeronautica. In addition to his activity as a journalist, he also participated in flight missions, obtaining a Bronze Medal of Military Valor. On 28 December 1940 he was recalled to Italy where he resumed the leadership of Cronaca prealpina in Varese.

In February 1941 he again volunteered for the Greco-Italian War, once again assigned to the 11th Alpini Regiment. On 14 March 1941 he volunteered to lead an attack aimed at capturing the northern tip of Mali i Shëndëllisë, a mountain in Albania held by the Greeks; his squad succeeded in capturing the Greek outpost, but was then driven back by a Greek counterattack, in which Giani was killed in hand-to-hand combat. He was posthumously awarded the Gold Medal of Military Valor.
