= 1st Congress of the Fasci Italiani di Combattimento =

The 1st Congress of the Fasci Italiani di Combattimento was held in Florence on 9 and 10 October 1919, following the proclamation of the Sansepolcro program on 23 March of the same year by Benito Mussolini.

== The congress ==
According to official data, the congress was attended by representatives of 137 groups for a total of 40,385 members, figures that the historian Renzo De Felice considers "very inflated for obvious propaganda purposes". In fact, in the subsequent congress of Rome in 1921, the representation was retrospectively reduced to 56 bundles with about 17,000 members.

Among the most important speeches: Umberto Fabbri of Rome, who presented the program of the movement, Filippo Tommaso Marinetti, who developed a violently anti-clerical discourse tending to impose "the expulsion of the papacy" from Italy (a goal that Marinetti defined as svaticanization), Giacomo Francia, delegate of Trani who addressed the problems of southern Italy, and Michele Bianchi, who supported the opportunity to maintain freedom of action in the electoral alliances (the majority instead supported the need to join only blocks of leftist interventionists).

Mussolini developed a very optimistic discourse, declaring that he had no prejudices either royalist or republican, he overshadowed the threat of an insurrection but at the same time declared that D'Annunzio's occupation of Fiume would be resolved positively without the need for a revolutionary uprising. He called for the abolition of press censorship, for future general elections he identified a coalition of leftist interventionists as the only possible alliance. He attacked the Nitti government and covertly the monarchy that supported it.

=== Agendas approved ===
At the conclusion of the intervention, Mussolini proposed four agendas which were approved:

- Adherence to the movement of economic liberation and autonomy of the working class
- Abolition of censorship
- Support for Gabriele D'Annunzio
- Electoral alliances

== The elections of 1919 ==
However, the strategy for the political elections approved by the congress turned out to be unsuccessful, highlighting the weakness of a movement that had only been established for a few months. The attempt to create an electoral bloc including the other forces of the interventionist left, such as republicans and revolutionary syndicalists, was rejected by the interlocutors. In conclusion: in Milan the fascists had to fall back on a single list with futurists, arditi and war volunteers (in which they had a very minority presence), in none of the other constituencies were they able to present their own lists. In some constituencies the combat bands ended up supporting liberal opposition lists to the government (thus doing the exact opposite of what had been decided by the congress). The electoral results were very modest.

== See also ==
- Fascist Manifesto
