= Fascist University Groups =

Student branch of the Italian National Fascist Party

The Fascist University Groups (Gruppi Universitari Fascisti, GUF) were the student branch of the Italian National Fascist Party. Founded in 1920 and restructured in 1927, they brought together all the Italian students who were obliged to enroll there. The purpose of the GUF was to educate the future ruling class following the doctrine of Mussolini's fascist regime. From 1934, they organized annual meetings, called Littoriali, devoted to culture and art, which would join that of sport, created in 1932. The GUF tried to recover the feluca, a hat symbol of Goliardia, a traditional association of Italian students, at the origin of the Corda Fratres, an international student association particularly present in Italy.

== Origin ==
As early as 1919, university students began to join the nascent movement of the Fasci Italiani di Combattimento, forming action squads made up of goliards in numerous cities. In 1920, the Fascist University Groups were officially born, which brought together all the university students who recognized themselves first in the Sansepolcrista program and then in the National Fascist Party. Guido Bortolotto became a trustee. In 1927, after the totalitarianization of the state, there was a restructuring of the groups. The Party will thus pay attention to its organization and to the education of this youth which, according to Benito Mussolini, will have to shape "the future ruling class" of Italy.

== Organization ==
Young people between the ages of 18 and 21 who came from the Gioventù Italiana del Littorio (GIL) and were enrolled in a university, a secondary school, a military academy or the Accademia Fascista della GIL were part of the GUF, groups with exclusively voluntary registration. The GUF were co-opted into nuclei of at least 25 fascist university students, established in each city, under the command of a person in charge designated by the Federal Secretary, at the proposal of the Secretary of the GUF. The heads of each nucleus formed part of the respective directors of the local combat groups. Each GUF had sections for men and women graduates, a Section for Foreign Students (where there were any) and a section for women, which included university students, graduates and graduates up to 28 years of age.

== Tasks ==
The GUFs were dedicated to:

- Political-cultural activities, with the aim of preparing and selecting young people. They were carried out through the School of Fascist Mysticism, which organized and coordinated political preparation courses, pre-lictory and literary courses on culture, art and work, the experimental theater of the GUF, the cinematographic, radio and university press sections;
- Sports activities, with the organization of Agonali, Littorali dello sport, Mountaineering and Seafaring Weeks;
- Assistance activity, carried out through student houses and dining rooms and medical offices.

== The Littorali ==
In 1932 the Littorali dello sport were established, a kind of national student championships, which included various sports disciplines and were organized each year in a different city. The littoriali served mainly as a propaganda event and were always an occasion for the celebration of the cult of the Duce. The winning Guf had the honor of qualifying as a Guf Littoriale and wearing a golden M (Mussolini's initial) on his tunic.

Starting in 1934, the Littoriali della cultura e dell'arte (organized by Giuseppe Bottai and Alessandro Pavolini) were also organized annually, which on some occasions turned out to be occasions for fronds against the regime.

== Points of view ==
According to former president Giorgio Napolitano, these discussion meetings between young intellectuals led to the birth of the first conflicts within the PNF. He believes that the GUF "were in fact a veritable breeding ground for anti-fascist intellectual energies, masked and to a certain extent tolerated." The direct testimony of the director Turi Vasile is also similar, according to which, thanks also to the "indulgence that was reserved at that time, for rhetoric or excess of security, to the youth", within the GUF they took advantage of this situation "to free us from any ideological conditioning".

According to the few historians who have dealt with it and other direct witnesses of the GUF (among the former, Mirella Serri and Simone Duranti, among the latter, Nino Tripodi, Davide Lajolo), the adherents of the GUF were, instead, fanatical fascists, often anti-Semites, supporters of the most extremist wing of the regime, criticizing its excessive moderation and the loss of the revolutionary thrust of the early days.
