= Palazzo Castani =

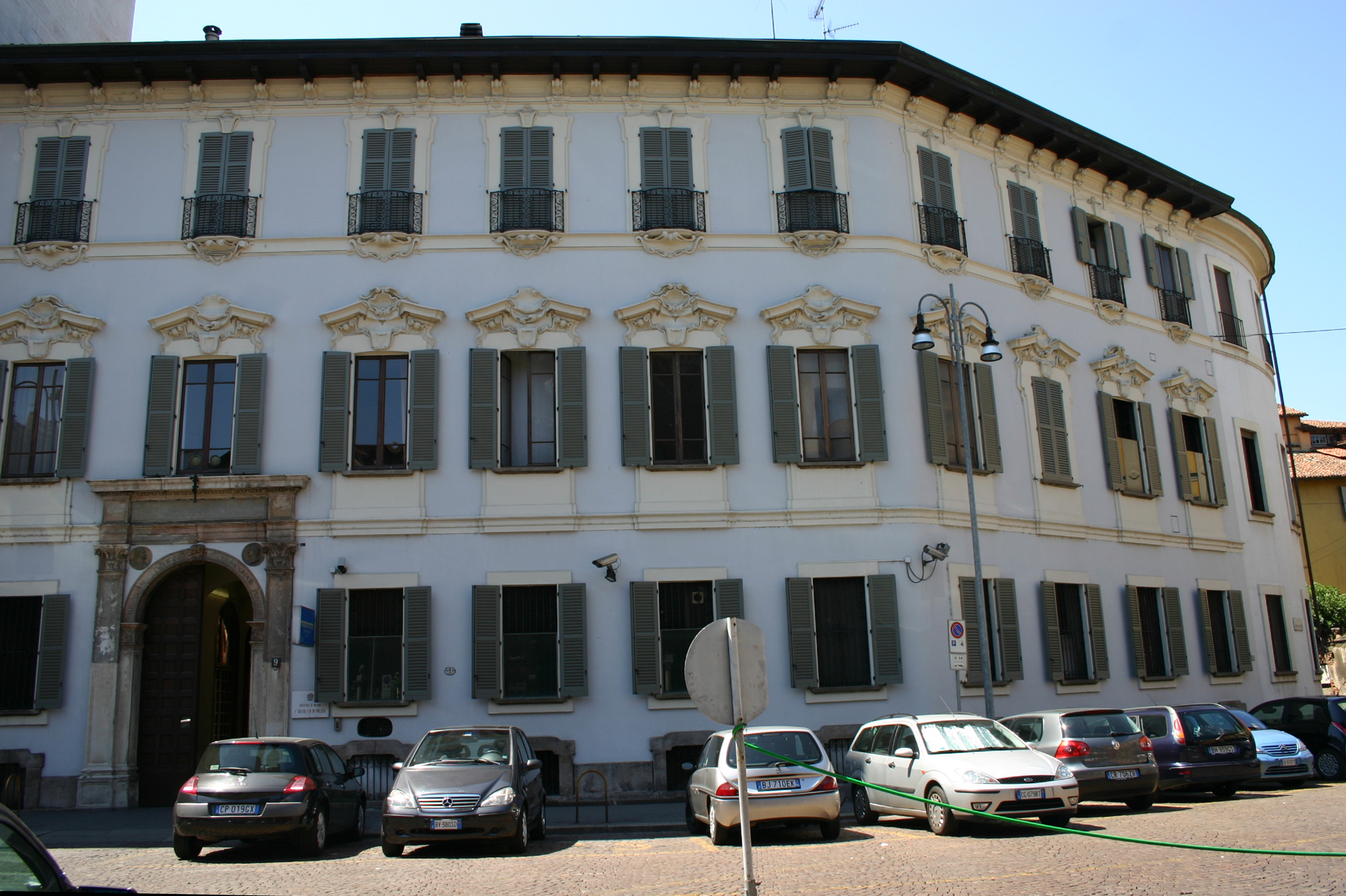
- Palazzo Castani
- Interactive map of the Palazzo Castani area

General information
- Status: In use
- Type: Palace
- Architectural style: Renaissance
- Location: Milan, Italy, 9, piazza San Sepolcro
- Coordinates: 45.462785°N 9.184961°E
- Construction started: 15th century (original structure)
- Completed: 17th century (reconstruction)

Design and construction
- Architect: Giuseppe Meda

Palazzo Castani is a historic building located in the centre of Milan, at Piazza San Sepolcro 9, and today houses the Commissariato Centro of the Polizia di Stato. It was the national headquarters of the Partito Nazionale Fascista from 1921 to 1924, and of the Partito Fascista Repubblicano from 1943 to 1945.

== History and description ==
The palace, whose structure dates back to the 15th century, has three floors; however, the façade was almost completely rebuilt in the 17th century: the first order on the ground floor consists of a plinth in stone; the portal, not centred with respect to the façade, is the only surviving element of the old façade and is composed of a mixture of marble and stone from Angera, with some surviving decorations in terracotta.

On the upper floors, one can note the tympanums broken by figures of shells on the first floor, while the second is decorated with balconcini mixtilinear wrought iron. Inside is the courtyard portico on three sides: these porticoes have cross vaults and are composed of round arches in terracotta resting on Corinthian columns.

The building became famous for being the headquarters of Mussolini's Federazione Fasci Milanesi: the name of Sansepolcrismo being derived from the square.

== Bibliography ==
=== Italian sources ===
- Oscar Pedro Melano, Milano di terracotta e mattoni, Mazzotta, 2002.
- F. Mattei, F. Salatin, Lezioni vitruviane. Guillaume Budè e Giano Lascaris, in "Scholion", 8 2015, pp. 80-102.
