= Futurist Political Party =

- Leader: Filippo Tommaso Marinetti
- Founded: 1918; 108 years ago
- Dissolved: 1920; 106 years ago
- Preceded by: Fasci Politici Futuristi
- Merged into: Fasci Italiani di Combattimento
- Newspaper: Roma Futurista
- Ideology: Anti-clericalism; Futurism; Italian nationalism Land reform National syndicalism Republicanism
- Political position: Left-wing
- National affiliation: Fasci Italiani di Combattimento (1919–1920)
- Colours: Blue
- Politics of Italy; Political parties; Elections; A: Upon its foundation, the party was left-wing in its orientation. After merging with the Fasci Italiani di Combattimento, the Futurists represented the left-wing faction of fascism, and broke off with Mussolini over his support for class collaboration between the proletariat and the bourgeoisie, and his truce with the Vatican and the Italian monarchy.

The Futurist Political Party (Italian: Partito Politico Futurista) was an Italian political party founded in 1918 by Filippo Tommaso Marinetti as an extension of the futurist artistic and social movement. The party had a radical program which included promoting gender parity and abolishing marriage, inheritance, military service and secret police. It sought to respond to the economic and political demands of war veterans, workers, women, and farmworkers. The party was absorbed into the Fasci Italiani di Combattimento in 1919.

The party had a syndicalist program that combined both socialism and Italian nationalism, but rejected the internationalism of the former and traditionalism of the latter. Favoring a left-wing agenda, the Futurists unsuccessfully attempted to steer Fascism towards anti-monarchism, anti-clericalism, and revolutionary syndicalism. The Futurists then left Fasci Italiani di Combattimento in May 1920, and unsuccessfully sought an alliance with the Italian Communist Party. Afterwards, some Futurists rejoined the Fascist party, while others joined the Italian Socialist Party.

== History ==
=== Background ===
Italian Futurism arose in the years prior to World War I with Filippo Tommaso Marinetti and his publication of the Manifesto of Futurism in 1909. Around that time, Futurism in Italy was, according to the book International Futurism in Arts and Literature, more of a Futurist "attitude" towards politics rather than of a true political creed. The idea of Futurism was a modern nationalist movement, diverging from past nationalism which was seen as cultist or fetishistic towards the past and its traditions. Instead, futurists enthusiastically embraced modernity and the industrial transformation of Italy. Futurist nationalism was anti-authoritarian, anti-clerical, and never ruled out the idea of joining forces with the revolutionary Left, anarchists, communists, and socialists and syndicalists in order to combat the bourgeois liberal society and the bureaucratic and centralist state, which was seen as a common enemy.

Despite attempts, Futurist dedication to nationalism and internationalism prevented the movement from ever forming a stable alliance with the left. Futurists thought that the proletariat could only be emancipated through nationalist pride, energy, and territorial expansion. This stance led it to oppose the Italian Socialist Party and socialism as a whole, as the party was both pacifist and internationalist.

With the Italo-Turkish War in 1912, politics assumed a major role within the futurist movement. With the outbreak of World War I in August 1914, they were the first to call for intervention against the Austrians and Germans and joined the country's armed forces once Italy entered the war. Futurists envisioned the war as a catalyst for dismantling the old order, anticipating the realization of Futurist prophecies in what Marinetti referred to as the "Italian Revolution."

=== Founding ===
According to author Selena Daly, Marinetti's interest in engaging with politics was half-hearted at best. In previous years most political attempts by the futurist were mainly excuses to rowdly violence or gain cheap publicity. There were expectations that Marinetti would run in the 1913 general election, as evidenced by the printing of 100,000 copies of the third Futurist political manifesto, but he ultimately rejected the idea of candidacy. The idea of an actual Futurist Political Party arose in 1917 and was first mentioned in the 9 December issue of the L'Italia futurista. The party's manifesto was published two months later in February 1918 in the final issue of L'Italia futurista, although the party wouldn't be formed until November 1918.

The Roma Furturista was founded in the same year by Mario Carli, Marinetti, and Emilio Settimelli in order to spread the ideas of the new party. The party was the first of its kind, and the requirements to join it was to be an interventionist, glorify war, and be opposed to neutralist, the liberal state, the monarchy, and the church.

=== Merger ===
The futurists were amongst the first fascists as the party was absorbed into the Fasci Italiani di Combattimento in 1919 and Marinetti becoming a member of its central committee. While fascism drew much inspiration from the Futurist party program, both Futurism and Fascism lived side by side without losing their own individual characteristics. One was a movement of artists seeking to influence politics, the other was a movement of politicians who wanted to use art to extend their sphere of influence.

The common denominators of Futurism and Fascism were populism and the belief of primacy of nation over class. Fascism appropriated Marinetti's thesis that the national identity of the people was far more important than their class identity - at the second Fascist Congress in May 1920, it was stated that Fascism would support "any initiative by those minority groups of the proletariat that were able to assimilate class interest to the nationalist one."

Fascism and Futurism also shared other ideological influences, such as being based on the revolutionary syndicalism of Georges Sorel, as well as the thought of Enrico Corradini and Giovanni Pascoli, who spoke of conflict between ‘proletarian’ (poor) nations and ‘bourgeois’ (rich) nations and their attacks on ‘European plutocracies’ such as Britain and France. Both movement believed that Italy had been discriminated against in being excluded from owning colonies, and initially Fascism shared the Futurist hostility towards Austria and everything "German".

=== Split ===
This symbiotic relationship endured for less than a year before it began to fall apart after the 1919 Italian general election in which the fascists were defeated. In its aftermath, Fascism underwent a transformation, veering towards the right in the pursuit of better prospects, abandoning its previous libertarian, anti-conservative, and anti-clerical direction.

During the National Fascist Congress in May 1920, Carli and Marinetti walked out in disgust, denouncing fascism as "reactionary." This was the final conclusion to a split which had emerged within the Futurist party itself during the early months of 1920. The party had struggled to establish itself as a cohesive political force and faced rapid disintegration due to the lack of uniformity among its artists, arditi, and intellectuals.

Marinetti and other Futurists represented the left-wing faction of Fascism, believing that Fascism represented a revolutionary and left-wing movement that demonstrated "a Futurist consciousness". They expressed their disgust over Mussolini's abandonment of anti-clericalism and anti-monarchism - key Futurist policies. Instead, Mussolini pursued a truce with both the Vatican and the Italian monarchy, and reoriented Fascism towards the far right. On 29 May 1920, Marinetti and other Futurists handed down their resignations from the Fascist party, complaining that Fascism had distanced itself from the masses and abandoned proletarian and revolutionary demands.

The main point of conflict between Fascism and Futurism was Mussolini’s support of the collaboration between the proletariat and the ‘productive bourgeoisie’, which Marinetti and other Futurists strongly rejected. Marinetti instead pursued an idea of a socialist inspiration, the formation of a vanguardist proletariato dei geniali (proletariat of the geniuses) that would lead the country and pursue revolutionary goals, such as anti-monarchism, anti-clericalism, and a combination of democratic and socialist policies.

=== Aftermath ===
A faction of the remaining Futurist movement shifted towards the left, finding renewed inspiration in the Italian Regency of Carnaro. They carried on the fight for the "Italian revolution" by utilizing Carli's journal, La testa di ferro, which adopted an openly anti-Fascist stance. The journal aimed to establish a fresh alliance between Futurism and the working class, fostering collaboration between "revolutionary Italians" and "revolutionary Bolsheviks," particularly during the Biennio Rosso period.

Following the March on Rome, several intransigent Futurist leaders, including Marinetti, returned to the fold of Mussolini's Fascist Party in the hopes that they could at least influence the regime's cultural policy. Marinetti's decision to return to the movement was based on his interpretation of class struggle - he interpreted it "not in terms of hegemonic and subaltern groups of people, rather of violence and elan vital." This led him to believe that he could preserve the "Futurist revolutionary spirit" by influencing cultural and social policies of the Fascist regime.

Sydney Kellen Conrad characterizes the Futurist decision to return to the Fascist party as opportunism - by reconciling themselves with Fascism, Marinetti and his Futurists ensured the survival of their movement while Mussolini cracked down on other left-wing parties. In return for their support, Mussolini financed a number of Futurist exhibits and integrated the movement into the propagandistic apparatus of the Fascist state. Marinetti was also named a "cultural ambassador" of Italy. Mussolini used Futurism to improve his standing with left-wing nationalist circles.

Despite rejoining the Fascist movement, Marinetti remained left-wing in his ideology, and made an effort to shield France Bevk from Fascist persecution. Futurists that rejoined the Fascist party also strained the Italian relations with Nazi Germany, as they denounced racist policies and censorship of modern art in Germany.

== Ideology ==
The ideology of the party was formulated by its founder, Filippo Tommaso Marinetti. Marinetti sympathized with anarchism and revolutionary syndicalism, but he was also an ardent nationalist and admired Francesco Crispi, whom Marinetti considered his "preferred great Italian patriot". Marinetti was in disagreement with both Italian socialists and nationalists - he rejected the socialist opposition to nationalism, stating: "My passion for Italy forbids me to savour any internationalisms." At the same time, he considered Italian nationalist movements "far too traditionalist".

Initially, Marinetti sought the support of anarcho-syndicalists, and wished to contest the 1913 Italian general election in Piedmont with "an anarcho-syndicalist programme of a nationalistic bent". Ultimately, he came to embrace futurism by transforming it into a political movement. His manifesto of the Futurist Political Party denounced "parasitical clericalism" and "ceremonial patriotism" and promoted revolutionary nationalism and syndicalism. Marinetti defined the qualities of a Futurist as follows: "unbridled love of our Divine Italy, fierce love of liberty, love of innovation and the progressive spirit, revolutionary type of nationalism, passion for violence, war and heroic gestures; audacity, bravado and youthful cockiness; elastic discipline, flexible and practical thinking opposed to German pedantry and meticulousness". The main political demands of the movement came to be anti-monarchism, anti-clericalism, and "socialization of the extended public soil".

The party had a complicated relationship with other left-wing movements. It fiercely denounced the Italian Socialist Party, despite sharing with it the socialist phraseology - the Futurists denounced the Italian bourgeoisie and declared their solidarity with the working class. The Futurist Political Party dismissed the Italian socialists over their internationalism, with a prominent member of the party, Mario Carli, writing: "If the Russian Bolsheviks can be patriotic, why do the Italian Socialists have to be anti-nationalists? If the Russian proletariat espouses violence as a revolutionary means of change, why does the Italian proletariat have to be cowards and pacifists?"

The Futurists regarded the October Revolution as a blueprint for the Futurist "Italian Revolution". However, Marinetti drew contrasts between the "nation" in Italy and the "workers and peasants" in Russia; he also argued that the Bolsheviks were mistaken in their "uncreative collectivism and the negation of the individual". Ultimately, the Futurist conclusion was that while the Bolshevik Revolution was to be an inspiration, Italy had to find its own revolutionary model based on its own national values. The party also reinterpreted Marxism in a similar way that fascism did - both Futurism and Fascism argued that the nation is more important than class, along the princinple of "the identity as the people plays a much more important rôle than the identity as class". Marinetti stressed the primacy of nation over class, and also denounced Marx's statement in which he proclaimed himself the "citizen of the world", with Marinetti arguing that this statement had "the same meaning as ‘I don’t give a damn about Italy, Europe or Humanity. All I care about is myself’".

Despite this, the Futurists were friendly towards the Italian Communist Party and some factions of the party advocated an alliance with it, with the common point being the Futurist willingness to "organize the class struggle effectively and lead the workers into the long overdue Italian Revolution." The Futurists also distanced themselves from right-wing parties and recruited followers from the left-wing political spectrum such as anarchists, communists, and syndicalists. Eventually, the party started reaching out to Italian ex-combatants, which exposed them to the fascist movement and eventually led to the Futurist Political Party merging into the Fasci Italiani di Combattimento.

=== Futurist Democracy ===
- The abolition of marriage, with children raised by the state with funds raised by a tax on free love.
- Bureaucratic decentralization and abolition of seniority in state careers.
- "Technical government without Senate", i.e. a youth council made up of a dozen people under 30 years, elected by universal suffrage direct.
- Land reform similar to that of Henry George.
- Gender equality in employment and participation in political life.
- Creation of "schools of courage and patriotism", which eventually became the Opera Nazionale Balilla.
- Prison reform and abolition of the political police.

Francesca Billiani listed the party's manifesto as containing the following points: "socio-political propositions about universal suffrage (including women’s suffrage), the patriotic education of the proletariat, land reclamation for war veterans, progressive taxation, abolition of the obligatory army in favour of a voluntary one, the freedom to strike and of the press and an eighteen-hour working day. Further, a proposal for the technicalization of Parliament was included, with the recruitment of industrialists, agricultural workers and technical engineers and businessmen to form a rational and practical Parliament, that in turn could be swiftly dismantled if it failed to deliver results. The Manifesto also championed ‘every passéist State intervention in the arts’."

=== After merge ===
Marinetti initially praised Mussolini and his fascist movement as "a political concept that is absolutely Futurist, that is: anti-traditional, practical, heroic, revolutionary”. However, Marinetti and other Futurists became concerned over a perceived lack of revolutionary alignment and reactionary tendencies in fascism. Marinetti expressed his concern over "the rather reactionary tendency of the rally to act against Socialism. It is necessary to prepare an Italian revolution against the vile government, the monarchical order, the Vatican, the parliament." According to Günter Berghaus, Mussolini only considered the Futurists allies of convenience, which he wanted to use to attract left-wing nationalists to the fascist movement. Marinetti came to denounce Mussolini as "a megalomaniac who will bit by bit turn into a reactionary" and regarded him as "a reactionary, authoritarian, autocratic, fanatical blockhead with a penchant for discipline and militarism". However, after the March on Rome, Marinetti decided to return to the fascist movement in a bid to ensure the survival of his Futurist political thought.

Despite its association with Fascism, Antonio Gramsci believed in revolutionary potential of Futurism arguing that "if structured and organized, futurism and communism working together had the potential to allow Italy to replicate a cultural situation similar to that underway in the Soviet Union." He recognized the anti-bourgeois potential that Futurism had in the disruptive role of its arts and its attempts to dismantle consolidated institutions. Following the lead of Gramsci, some Communists believed that Marinetti's Futurism could be a force for social transformation and proletarian militancy.

Katherine N. Judah described the Futurist Political Party as left-wing in its ideology, and likewise classified Marinetti as a leftist intellectual. Despite their hostility to the Italian socialists, the Futurists remained friendly towards the Italian communists, and Marinetti tried to negotiate a Futurist-Communist coalition between 1920 and 1925. Main points of disagreements between Futurism and Communism proved to be Marinetti's ardent nationalism, and his belief that a Futurist State would be directed by avant-garde artists who could lead the masses into a liberated future society - in this way, Futurists assumed an elitist and not proletarian revolution. Nevertheless, even after 1925, Gramsci and some Communists maintained their belief that Futurism and Communism could cooperate.

== Works cited ==
- Berghaus, Günter (2012). International Futurism in Arts and Literature. De Gruyter. ISBN 9783110804225.
- Berghaus, Günter (2019). Handbook of International Futurism. Berlin/Boston: Walter de Gruyter. ISBN 978-3-11-027347-2.
- Billiani, Francesca (2023). Fascist Modernism in Italy: Arts and Regimes. London: Bloomsbury Academic. ISBN 978-1-7883-1759-7.
- Daly, Selena (2016). Italian Futurism and the First World War. University of Toronto Press. ISBN 9781442619357.
- Donátková, Zuzana (2020). "Futurism and the Birth of Fascism" (PDF). West Bohemian Historical Review. 10 (1): 69–99.
- Judah, Katherine N. (2007). L'art pour I'art or I'art pour la vie? An Analysis of the Historical Avant-Garde Manifestos (PDF). The University of Edinburgh.
