= Stefanini =

For the company, see Stefanini IT Solutions.

Stefanini is an Italian surname. Notable people with the surname include:

- Antonietta Stefanini, best known as Antonella Steni (1926–2016), Italian actress, voice actress, comedian and presenter
- Fúlvio Stefanini (born 1939), Brazilian actor
- Lucrezia Stefanini (born 1998), Italian tennis player
- Luigi Stefanini (1891–1956), Italian philosopher
- Matteo Stefanini (born 1984), Italian rower
- Rafe Stefanini (born 1950s), Italian banjo player and guitarist
