= Fascist Manifesto =

Italian fascist manifesto

"The Manifesto of the Italian Fasces of Combat" (Italian: "Il manifesto dei fasci italiani di combattimento"), also referred to as the Fascist Manifesto or the San Sepolcro Programme ("Programma di San Sepolcro") is the political platform developed from statements made during the founding of the Fasci Italiani di Combattimento, held in Piazza San Sepolcro in Milan on March 23, 1919.

It was the initial declaration of the political stance of the Fasci Italiani di Combattimento ("Italian Fasces of Combat") the movement founded in Milan by Benito Mussolini in 1919 and it is an early expression of fascism known as sansepolcrismo. The manifesto was co-authored by national syndicalist Alceste de Ambris and the futurist poet Filippo Tommaso Marinetti.

The manifesto was published in Il Popolo d'Italia on June 6, 1919, and it is divided into four sections, describing the movement's objectives in political, social, military and financial fields.

== Text ==
Italians!

Here is the program of a sane Italian movement. Revolutionary because anti-dogmatic and anti-demagogical; strongly innovative because anti-prejudicial. We place the valorization of revolutionary war above everything and everyone. The other problems: bureaucratic, administrative, legal, educational, colonial, etc., we will chart when we have created the ruling class.

For this WE WANT:

On the political problem:

- Universal suffrage by regional list voting, with proportional representation, voting and eligibility for women.
- Minimum age for voters lowered to 18; minimum age for deputies lowered to 25.
- The abolition of the Senate.
- The convening of a National Assembly for the duration of three years, whose first task is to establish the form of the state constitution.
- The formation of National Technical Councils of labor, industry, transportation, social hygiene, communications, etc., elected by the professional or trade communities, with legislative powers, and the right to elect a General Commissioner with ministerial powers.

On the social problem:

WE WANT:

- The prompt enactment of a state law enshrining the legal eight-hour workday for all jobs.
- Minimum wages.
- The participation of workers' representatives in the technical operation of industry.
- The entrusting to the proletarian organizations themselves (who are morally and technically worthy) of the management of public industries or services.
- The speedy and complete settlement of the railroad workers and all transportation industries.
- A necessary amendment of the Disability and Old Age Insurance Bill by lowering the age limit, currently proposed at 65, to 55.

On the military issue:

WE WANT:

- The establishment of a national militia with brief educational services and exclusively defensive duty.
- The nationalization of all arms and explosives factories.
- A national foreign policy intended to enhance, in the peaceful competitions of civilization, the Italian nation in the world.

On the financial problem:

WE WANT:

- A strong extraordinary tax on capital of a progressive nature, having the form of true PARTIAL EXPROPRIATION of all wealth.
- The seizure of all property of religious congregations and the abolition of all diocesan benefices, which constitute a huge liability for the nation and a privilege of the few.
- The revision of all war supply contracts and the seizure of 85 percent of war profits.

— Filippo Tommaso Marinetti and Alceste de Ambris, Manifesto dei Fasci italiani di combattimento

== The manifesto in practice ==
The early positions reflected in the manifesto would later be characterized by Mussolini in 1932 "The Doctrine of Fascism" as "a series of pointers, forecasts, hints which, when freed from the inevitable matrix of contingencies, were to develop in a few years time into a series of doctrinal positions entitling Fascism to rank as a political doctrine differing from all others, past or present."

Of the manifesto's proposals, the commitment to corporative organisation of economic interests was to be the longest lasting.

Conversely, other aspects of the Fascist Manifesto would be dropped by Mussolini's National Fascist Party (PNF) due to its rightward shift and cooperation with the Savoyard monarchy, the Roman Catholic Church, and conservative elites. While proportional representation in parliamentary elections — a demand of the original Fascist manifesto — was introduced by the government of Francesco Saverio Nitti already in 1919, Mussolini replaced it with a system which gave two-thirds of parliamentary seats to the first-placed party through the Acerbo law. Far from becoming a medium of extended democracy, parliament became by law an exclusively Fascist-picked body in 1929; being replaced by the "chamber of corporations" a decade later. The demand for universal suffrage would only be satisfied by the Italian Republic after the fall of fascism: voting rights for women were introduced for the 1946 constituent assembly election and institutional referendum, and the Constitution of the Italian Republic produced by this assembly lowered the eligibility age to 25 two years later, but it was only in 1975 that the voting age was lowered to 18. The senate was never abolished by Mussolini; it was only transformed from a royally-appointed body to an elective one by the republican constitution after his regime's demise.

An eight-hour workday was introduced in 1925.

Fascism's pacifist foreign policy ceased during its first year of Italian government. In September 1923, the Corfu crisis demonstrated the regime's willingness to use force internationally. Perhaps the greatest success of Fascist diplomacy was the Lateran Treaty of February 1929, which accepted the principle of non-interference in the affairs of the Church. This ended the 59-year-old dispute between Italy and the Papacy.

== See also ==
- Definitions of fascism
- Communist Manifesto
- Manifesto of Futurism
- Constitution of Fiume
- "Manifesto of the Fascist Intellectuals"
- "Manifesto of Race"
