= Ernesto Daquanno =

Italian journalist (1897–1945)

Personal details
- Born: 7 January 1897 Rome, Kingdom of Italy
- Died: 28 April 1945 (aged 48) Dongo, Italy
- Party: National Fascist Party
- Occupation: Director of Agenzia Stefani
- Profession: Journalist

Ernesto Daquanno (7 January 1897 – 28 April 1945) was an Italian journalist during the Fascist regime, the last director of Agenzia Stefani, Italy’s main press agency.

== Biography ==
A nationalist, futurist and personal friend of Filippo Tommaso Marinetti, on 23 March 1919 he participated in the foundation of the Italian Fasces of Combat in Piazza San Sepolcro in Milan. During the Fascist period he collaborated with the regime as editor of various newspapers.

After the fall of Mussolini on 25 July 1943, following orders issued by the new Badoglio government, he was fired from the newspaper La Stampa, of which he directed the Roman editorial board, while the newspaper Il Lavoro Fascista, of which he was the main editor, ceased publication.

He joined the Italian Social Republic immediately after its foundation in September 1943, becoming one of the leading journalists and editor of the Giornale Radio-EIAR, whose headquarters were moved to Milan. On 26 January 1944 he became director of the newspaper Il Lavoro in Genoa, where he remained until 2 June, when he was replaced by Gian Gino Pellegrini; on 5 June 1944 he became general director of Agenzia Stefani, for which he worked until the end of his days. During the period of the direction of Il Lavoro he wrote over thirty articles on the socialization of enterprises, the most important of which were collected in a booklet, La socializzazione delle imprese.

After 25 April 1945, declaring that he wanted to make a last stand around Mussolini, he followed the dictator from Salò to Milan, then to Como and finally to Dongo, where he was captured and shot by the partisans. His body was carried to Milan and put on display in Piazzale Loreto.
