= Augusto Turati =

Italian politician

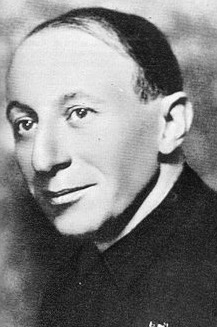
- Born: 16 April 1888; Parma
- Died: 27 August 1955 (aged 67); Rome
- Occupations: Journalist and Politician
- Height: 1.70 m (5 ft 7 in)

Augusto Turati (16 April 1888 – 27 August 1955) was an Italian journalist and Fascist politician.

== Biography ==
Born in Parma in 1888, after moving to Brescia as a young man, Turati worked on newspapers and became one of the editors at the liberal Provincia di Brescia; he attended law classes, but never graduated. An irredentist and advocate of Italy entering World War I, he volunteered for the front in 1915. In 1918, he returned to Brescia as head editor of the same newspaper.

In 1920, Turati joined the Fasci Italiani di Combattimento - a year later, the National Fascist Party (Partito Nazionale Fascista, or PNF). While active in trade unionism for the régime-backed corporatist enterprises, Turati was a secretary for the Brescia Fascio.

From 1926 to 1930, Turati was secretary of the PNF, helping in the consolidation of Benito Mussolini's rule. In May 1926, when fascist women of the Fasci Femminili demanded that they be allowed to wear black shirts, he responded: "The black shirt is the virile symbol of our revolution and has nothing do with the welfare tasks that Fascism has given women."

Turati was a keen sportsman who excelled at fencing. He doubled his task as PNF secretary with leadership positions in sports: a Federtennis president, a Federazione Italiana di Atletica Leggera one, and leader of the Italian National Olympic Committee (jobs held in 1928-1930). In 1928 he and Lando Ferretti founded a sports magazine, Lo Sport Fascista. In 1930-1931, he was a member of the International Olympic Committee. Turati was also the inventor of a short-lived and supposedly uniquely Italian team sport which he called volata.

Between 1924 and 1934, Turati served in the Italian Chamber of Deputies; in 1931-1932, he was the editor-in-chief of La Stampa. Accused of intrigues against other members of the PNF, Turati was demoted from official positions, and was confined on Rhodes (an Italian possession at the time) in 1933. Redeemed in 1937, he was released and assigned the task of carrying out a massive agricultural experiment in Ethiopia (part of Italian East Africa). He had to return to Italy after the project failed the next year.

Turati moved away from the political scene, and worked as a legal consultant. He was however opposed to Italy's entry into World War II, as well as to the Nazi-protected Italian Social Republic; at the end of the war, he nevertheless faced trial, but was acquitted on all charges.

He died in Rome.
