= Manlio Morgagni =

Italian Fascist, journalist and mayor

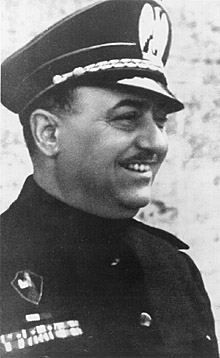
- Morgagni in 1939
- Born: June 3, 1879; Forlì-Cesena
- Died: July 26, 1943 (aged 64); Rome

Manlio Morgagni (June 3, 1879 in Forlì-Cesena – July 26, 1943 in Rome) was an Italian Fascist, journalist, mayor of Milan, member of the Senate of Italy, and director of the prominent news agency Agenzia Stefani during a period when it was closely aligned with the Fascist regime of Benito Mussolini.

== Background ==
Morgagni was born in Forlì-Cesena in 1879. His father was Andrea Morgagni, and his mother was Giulitta Monti. He is the brother of another prominent journalist, Tullio Morgagni. Morgagni gained a diploma from a commercial college. He was initially a supporter of socialist trade unions. He supported Italian intervention in World War I. From 15 November 1914 to 1919, he was administrative director of Il Popolo d'Italia, a newspaper he co-founded with Benito Mussolini. He turned the illustrated newspaper toward support of Fascism, including publishing lavish coverage of Fascist rallies, using foldout panorama images. Along with his brother, Tullio Morgagni, he was one of the founders of the Italian long-distance bicycle race, the Giro d'Italia, under the sponsorship of rival newspapers. In 1919, Arnaldo Mussolini became director of the newspaper, while Morgagni remained in charge of advertising. Morgagni became active in civic politics in Milan, serving as a city councillor from 1923 to 1926, and then as mayor of Milan from 1927 to 1928. In 1928, he founded the agricultural newspaper Nature.

== Agenzia Stefani and Mussolini ==
Manlio Morgagni has been described as an "acolyte" of Mussolini, and was an avowed supporter of Fascism. As Chairman of Agenzia Stefani from 1924 to 1943, he steered the news agency towards hardline propaganda in support of Mussolini. Journalists in Italy who opposed the Fascist regime were arrested and imprisoned at the islands Lipari and Lampedusa along with other political prisoners. Agenzia Stefani "systematically distorted the news" under Morgagni. While Italy lacked a propagandist with the individual influence of Joseph Goebbels, Mussolini was active in turning journalists into supporters of his regime, including foreign journalists, who he courted and flattered to gain positive coverage in American and European newspapers.

In 1924, Mussolini merged the existing radio broadcasters in Italy to form the Unione Radiofonica Italiana (URI), with Enrico Marchesi as its president. The agreement between the government and URI gave the government full censorship powers over URI broadcasts, and the only news to be broadcast by URI was from Agenzia Stefani.

Morgagni was nominated to the Senate of Italy by the Minister of Culture in 1939, and was named to the Senate the same year.

During his career, Morgagni was decorated by the Fascist regime several times, receiving the following distinctions:

Cavaliere di Gran Croce dell'Ordine della Corona d'Italia, received April 24, 1935

Grand'Ufficiale dell'Ordine dei Santi Maurizio e Lazzaro, received June 11, 1936

== Death ==
Morgagni committed suicide on July 26, 1943, the day after the fall of the Fascist regime in Italy, remaining a supporter of Mussolini to the end. Morgagni's suicide note was written to Mussolini:

My Duce! The maddening pain as an Italian and a Fascist has defeated me! It is not an act of cowardice that I make: I have no more energy, I have no more life. For over thirty years you, Duce, you have had all my loyalty. My life was yours. I have served at one time as a friend, I continued to do so, always passionately your subordinate with absolute devotion. I ask your forgiveness if I disappear. I die with your name on the lips and a plea for the salvation of Italy. Morgagni.

Morgagni is buried in Milan.

Agenzia Stefani had remained privately owned and ostensibly independent, despite many decades of close alignment with Italy's ruling regimes. This nominal independence ended with the death of Morgagni. Agenzia Stefani was appropriated outright by the Fascist government regime, and relocated to Northern Italy in 1943. Its last director, Ernesto Daquanno, was executed on April 28, 1945, shot with several other Fascist leaders.
