= Occultism and the far right =

Occultism and the far right may refer to:

- Ariosophy and Armanism, esoteric ideological systems developed by Jörg Lanz von Liebenfels and Guido von List
- Fascist mysticism, an Italian fascist political and religious thought based on fideism
- Occultism in Nazism
  - Esotericism in Germany and Austria § Esotericism in Nazi Germany
  - Esoteric neo-Nazism, a fusion of Nazi ideology with mystical, esoteric, and occult traditions
  - National Socialist black metal, a subgenre of black metal promoting neo-fascism, neo-Nazism, white supremacy, neopaganism, occultism, and Satanism

== See also ==
- Religious aspects of Nazism
