= Lando Ferretti =

Italian politician (1895–1977)

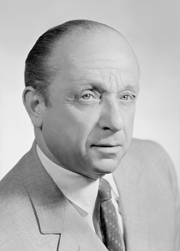
Lando Ferretti

Lando Ferretti (2 May 1895 in Pontedera, Province of Pisa – 8 January 1977 in Rome) was an Italian journalist, politician and sports administrator.

== Journalism ==
After studying law and letters at the University of Pisa Ferretti became a journalist, interrupting his career for army service in the First World War. Following the war he worked for the Italian administration in the newly added territory of Trentino. He then returned to journalism, serving as director of La Gazzetta dello Sport from 1919 to 1924, editor of the Il Secolo XIX from 1924 to 1926 and editor of the Corriere della Sera from 1927 to 1928. Then he and Augusto Turati founded a sports magazine, Lo Sport Fascista of which Ferretti was the director.

== Fascism ==
Ferretti was an early member of the National Fascist Party and was in the Lamarmora column during the March on Rome. He held a number of positions afterwards, notably head of the journalists' syndicate, which he dominated along with Giorgio Pini and Telesio Interlandi, a deputy from 1924 to 1940, a member of the Grand Fascist Council and an officer in the Blackshirts. In 1926 he was appointed press secretary to Benito Mussolini and in 1928 was promoted to head of the official press office, a role in which he significantly expanded state censorship. Ferretti particularly focused on the regional press, which had often been ignored by central government, and forced it to adhere to a Professional code of conduct that he established to ensure a pro-fascist outlook. To this end he established a propaganda section of the press office. Ferretti's reforms even covered the reporting of crime, financial incompetence or the failure of businesses and banks, all of which were severely restricted due to fears that they might reflect badly on the government, which consistently claimed Italy was only progressing in both economic and social terms. Ferretti was succeeded as press office chief by Gaetano Polverelli in December 1931.

Ferretti also served as president of the Italian National Olympic Committee and president of the Premio Letteraria Viareggio prize from 1931 to 1939. He was effectively the head of sport in Fascist Italy and used his position to campaign vigorously for an increase in participation in sport, linking it to fascist notions of vitality and the development of a disciplined military spirit. He was particularly influential in the growth of rugby union in Italy, lauding the game in the pages of the Corriere della Sera for its "extreme virile physical effort". The Italy national rugby union team made its debut in 1929, during the country's fascist period. Recognising the importance of sport to national identity, as well as the popular status of those skilled at sport, he sought to portray Mussolini himself as "Italy's first and most complete sportsman" and arranged for Il Duce to be regularly photographed horse-riding, skiing, hunting, motor racing, swimming or even just in attendance at sports events.

Ferretti continued to write for the Corriere della Sera during the Republic of Salò. He remained close to Mussolini until the end, fleeing with him to Como in 1945.

== Post-war politics ==
Ferretti was an early member of the Italian Social Movement and served the party as a member of the Italian Senate for Lazio. From 1959 to 1969 he was also a member of the European Parliament.

== Works ==
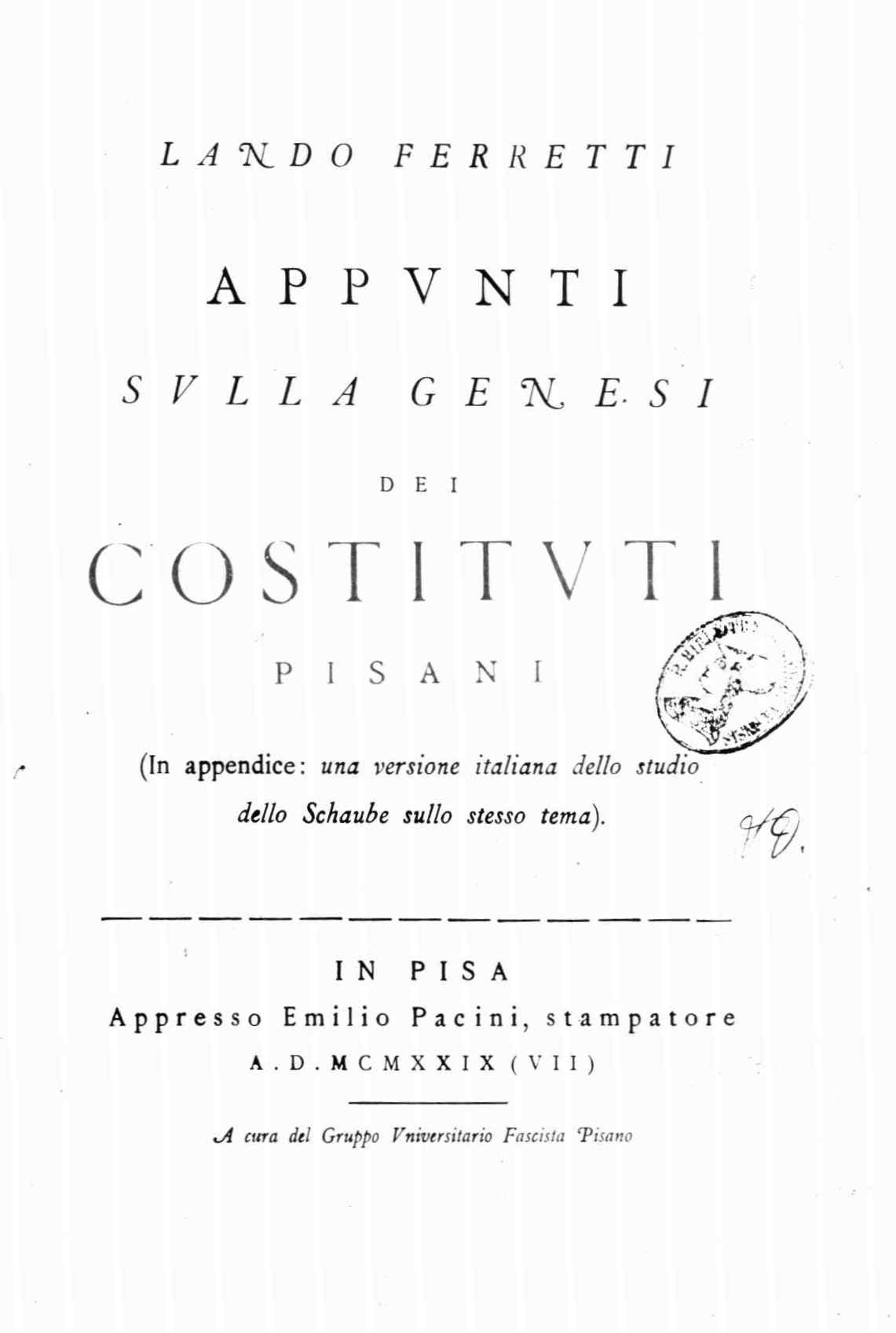
Appunti sulla genesi dei Costituti pisani, 1929

- Appunti sulla genesi dei Costituti pisani (in Italian). Pisa: Emilio Pacini. 1929.

Preceded by Aldo Finzi	President of the Italian National Olympic Committee; 1925–1928	Succeeded by Augusto Turati
