= Guglielmo Stefani =

Italian journalist (1819–1861)

Guglielmo Stefani (5 July 1819 – 11 June 1861) was a journalist and founder of the influential press agency Agenzia Stefani.

== Biography ==
After studies in Padua, he returned to his birthplace of Venice, where he worked as a journalist. He contributed to the daily newspaper Caffè Pedrocchi, a pro-unification publication that promoted Italian unification. During the 1848 uprisings, during which a failed attempt was made to free Venice from Austrian rule, Stefani was imprisoned. He was exiled, along with 86 other political prisoners condemned by Austria for their "perseverance in unjustifiable intrigues and revolutionary for their subversive tendencies". He went to Turin, where he was the Editor-in-Chief of the Piedmont newspaper Gazzetta piemontese. Stefani continued as director of the newspaper from 1849 to 1857.

Agenzia Stefani (Agenzia Telegrafica Stefani) was founded by Stefani in Turin, Italy on 26 January 1853, at a time when news agencies were also being established in other major European cities: Charles-Louis Havas established the Havas agency in Paris in 1836, Dr. Bernard Wolff established an agency in Berlin in 1849, and Paul Reuter established Reuters in London in 1858 (relocating from Aachen, where it had been established in 1851). These agencies made it easier to circulate news coverage between reporters whose work was originally done in English, French, German, or Italian. They pooled their own translation and research resources, and newspapers came to them as a centralized conduit for foreign news coverage in particular.

Agenzia Stefani was founded with assistance from Camillo Benso, Count of Cavour, who was Prime Minister of the Kingdom of Piedmont-Sardinia. Along with the Count de Cavour, Guglielmo Stefani supported Italian unification efforts. The Kingdom of Italy (1861–1946) would be established in the same year that both Cavour and Stefani died. The Agenzia Stefani continued after Stefani's death, and was known as a propaganda tool of the ruling regime in Italy, including during the Fascist regime of Benito Mussolini.

Agenzia Stefani was originally focussed on gathering news from Turin and the surrounding Piedmont area, but it increased in size and scope of news coverage as Italy was united during the mid- to late-19th century. For gathering foreign news, Agenzia Stefani held a contract with Paris news agency Havas. Agenzia Stefani transferred its headquarters, following the change in Italian capital cities, to Florence. In 1881, the headquarters of Agenzia Stefani moved from Turin to Rome, which already had a large community of journalists covering news related to the Vatican. Agenzia Stefani was less autonomous than other European news agencies, and in fact, operated much as a government agency in Italy, serving as a mouthpiece for the government regime.
