= Lo Sport Fascista =

Defunct sports magazine in Italy (1928–1943)

- Editor: Lando Ferretti
- Categories: Sports magazine
- Frequency: Monthly
- Founder: Augusto Turati; Lando Ferretti
- Founded: 1928
- First issue: June 1928
- Final issue: June 1943
- Country: Kingdom of Italy
- Based in: Milan
- Language: Italian language

Lo Sport Fascista was a monthly sports magazine which was published in Milan, Italy, during the fascist rule as the official organ of the fascist government. The magazine was in circulation between 1928 and 1943.

== History and profile ==
Lo Sport Fascista was launched in 1928, and the first issue appeared in June 1928. The same year the fascist regime also started other propagandistic sports periodicals, including La Palestra Fascista, Gran Sport and Milizia e Sport.

The founders of Lo Sport Fascista were Augusto Turati and Lando Ferretti who attempted to create a popular sports magazine for sportsmen and sports fans. The latter was also the director of the publication. The magazine was published by SA Poligrafica Degli Operai in Milan on a monthly basis.

Lo Sport Fascista was used by the fascist rule to spread the Roman character of sports as a means of educating the masses. Another mission of Lo Sport Fascista was to show the achievement of fascism in developing a new sporting aesthetic. Therefore, the magazine provided a synthesis of information about sports and propaganda. Vittorio Varale, Leone Boccali and Filippo Muzzi were among the regular contributors. The magazine enjoyed high levels of circulation at the very beginning of the 1930s when Italian athletes won medals in the most prestigious international sports events. Lo Sport Fascista folded in June 1943.
