= Fernando Mezzasoma =

Italian journalist

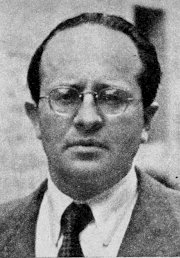

Minister of Popular Culture of the Italian Social Republic
- In office 23 September 1943 – 25 April 1945
- Preceded by: office created
- Succeeded by: office abolished

Personal details
- Born: 3 August 1907 Rome, Kingdom of Italy
- Died: 28 April 1945 (aged 37) Dongo, Italy
- Party: National Fascist Party; Republican Fascist Party

Military service
- Allegiance: Kingdom of Italy
- Branch/service: Royal Italian Army
- Unit: 7th Artillery Regiment
- Battles/wars: World War II; Battle of the Western Alps
- Awards: Bronze Medal of Military Valor

Fernando Mezzasoma (3 August 1907 – 28 April 1945), also referred to as Ferdinando, was an Italian fascist journalist and political figure. He was deputy national secretary of the National Fascist Party and Minister of Popular Culture of the Italian Social Republic.

== Biography ==
Mezzasoma was born in Rome, the son of middle-class Perugians; from his late teens he showed himself to be a passionate supporter of Benito Mussolini.

Mezzasoma had to contribute to his impoverished family's income from early on, and took several jobs before finishing studies in accounting. A secretary to the lawyer Amedeo Fani, he was integrated to the state bureaucracy in 1929, after Fani became undersecretary to the ministry of Dino Grandi (the Minister of Foreign Affairs). In 1931, he joined the ranks of the National Fascist Party (PNF), and soon after became secretary of the Perugia branch of the Gruppi Universitari Fascisti (GUF), the fascist student organization.

The following year, Mezzasoma was appointed one of the local PNF leaders in Perugia (holding the position until 1935). He began writing for official magazines, such as Dottrina Fascista and Roma Fascista, usually under the pen name Diogene. Editor of Assalto in 1934, he became co-editor of the GUF mouthpiece Libro e Moschetto; in 1937, he published Essenza dei GUF ("Essence of the GUF"), a propaganda volume that was distributed throughout the network of Fascist youth organizations. During the 1930s he was vice president of the School of Fascist Mysticism.

A national deputy-secretary of the GUF in 1935, he was included to the leadership group of the PNF in January 1937, and became its deputy national secretary on February 23, 1939. When Italy entered World War II as an Axis Power, he volunteered for the 7th Artillery Regiment and fought in the Western Alps against France, being awarded a Bronze Medal of Military Valor. In 1942, he quit the army to become the director of the Italian press; he continued in that role until 1943. Unlike a great many leading figures of the government (such as Galeazzo Ciano and Dino Grandi), he stayed loyal to Mussolini long after the July 1943 Grand Council of Fascism crisis which ended the latter's rule in Rome.

With the foundation of the Nazi Germany-assisted Italian Social Republic, he was appointed Mussolini's Minister of Popular Culture, and held this post until the Republic collapsed less than two years later.

He clashed with Junio Valerio Borghese and, on 19 April 1945 left for Milan, parting with his collaborators (including Giorgio Almirante). It seems that he had the opportunity to flee the region following Germany's defeat, but would have refused, saying: "I am a minister of Mussolini, I shall die with him".

Along with other fascist leaders and officials, at the end of the war he was captured near Lake Como while trying to make his way to Switzerland, and shot by the partisans in Dongo on 28 April 1945.

== Bibliography ==
- Carli, Maddalena (2010). "MEZZASOMA, Fernando". Dizionario Biografico degli Italiani (in Italian). Vol. 74: Messi–Miraglia. Rome: Istituto dell'Enciclopedia Italiana. ISBN 978-88-12-00032-6.
