= Sansepolcrismo =

Interwar Italian political movement of Mussolini

Sansepolcrismo was the movement led by Benito Mussolini that preceded Fascism. The Sansepolcrismo takes its name from the rally organized by Mussolini at Piazza San Sepolcro in Milan on March 23, 1919, where he proclaimed the principles of Fasci Italiani di Combattimento, and then published them in Il Popolo d'Italia, on June 6, 1919, the newspaper he co-founded in November 1914 after leaving Avanti!

== Origins ==
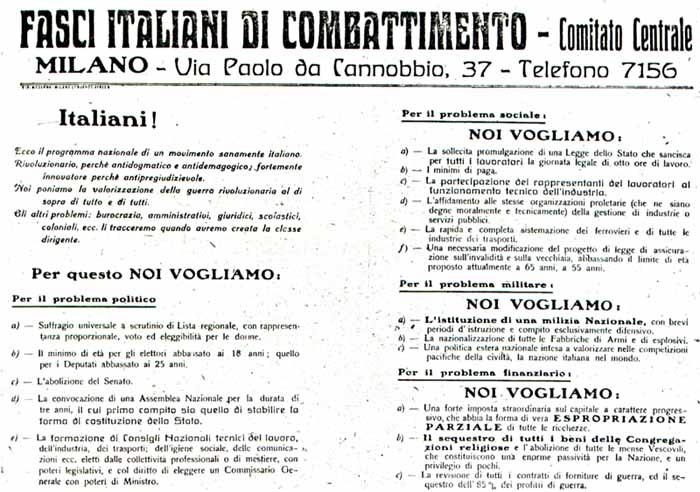
The platform of Fasci italiani di combattimento, as published in Il Popolo d'Italia on June 6, 1919.

On March 2, 1919, Il Popolo d'Italia published a statement that included the program for a meeting for March 23, 1919. Further mentions of the meeting were published on March 4 in Genoa by the Fascist War Veterans publications Italia Redenta ("Italy Redeemed") and Pensiero e Azione ("Thought and Action"). Word of the meeting was then spread among various veterans' associations spread throughout Italy. The statement was reiterated later March 9 in Il Popolo d'Italia: "On 23 March an 'anti-party' will be created, the Fighting Fascists, who will face against two dangers: the reaction of the right, and the destructiveness of the left."

On the evening of March 21, 1919, the Union Local of the Association of Traders and Merchants in Piazza San Sepolcro officially formed the Fascio di Combattimento di Milano ("Milan Fighting Fascists"). Participants were afterward regarded as the so-called Fascio primigenio ("primitive Fascists"). After the first meeting of the council, they included: Benito Mussolini, Ferruccio Vecchi, Enzo Ferrari, Michele Bianchi, Mario Giampaoli, Ferruccio Ferradini, and Carlo Meraviglia. It also decided that the gathering of March 23 would be chaired by Ferruccio Vecchi and that their Executive Secretary would be Michele Bianchi.

=== Foundation of the Fascists ===
In the previous days, rumors circulated that accused the Red Guards of planning to prevent the gathering. The night before, supporters began to organize in Milan, almost all veterans of World War I, but the morning of March 23 was found to be quiet at Piazza San Sepolcro and confirmed by Carlo Meraviglia, who had arrived in advance specifically to review the situation.

The meeting of the March 23, originally intended to be held at Teatro Dal Verme, had lower participation than expected, and ultimately was held in the meeting room of the Industrial Alliance in Piazza San Sepolcro in Milan, an arrangement made possible by the Industrial Alliance President, the interventionist Cesare Goldmann, who had financed Il Popolo d'Italia and also took part in the meeting. The first to speak was Ferruccio Vecchi, acting as chairman, who opened the meeting, followed by Lt. Enzo Agnelli, who gave greetings from the Milan Fighting Fascists, founded just two days before.

The first policy declaration was made by Mussolini, who spoke broadly on three fundamental points of the new movement. These were summarized on the following day in Il Popolo d'Italia:

I. This assembly of 23 March turns its first salute and its memory and reverent thought of the sons of Italy that have fallen to secure the greatness of the Fatherland and the freedom of the World, to the wounded and invalids, to all the combatants, the former prisoners who did their duty, and who declared themselves ready to energetically support the vindication of the material and moral order that was supported by the association of combatants [...]

II. This assembly of March 23 is opposed to imperialism at the expense of other peoples of Italy and Italian imperialism to the possible detriment of other peoples; it accepts the postulate of the Supreme League of Nations and the integration with regard to Italy must be realized in the Alps and the Adriatic with the claim and annexation of Fiume and Dalmatia. [...]
III. The Assembly of March 23, we the Fascists commit by all means to sabotage the neutralist candidates of all parties.

(Published in Il Popolo d'Italia of March 24, 1919)

After Mussolini, Filippo Tommaso Marinetti spoke, inviting those present to oppose the Italian Socialist Party, who he accused of launching the Biennio Rosso, which he called an assault on the country. There followed a short speech by Mario Carli, who brought the membership of some Fascists and futurists from Rome, Florence, Perugia and Taranto. The Manifesto principles of Mussolini, put to the vote, were approved unanimously by the Assembly.

The meeting was adjourned to resume work in the afternoon. Celso Morisi presented an agenda, approved by acclamation, in favor of the workers of Dalmine and Pavia, who despite being entered into a strike and having occupied the factories had also continued to work. Then came the speech of Malusardi and Giovanni Capodivacca who required the assembly "to give a precise content of fascist action" and especially "to take up the urgent problems of assistance to the victims of war". Capodivacca's speech brought further remarks from Mussolini, who took the floor again, laying the foundations of the Corporatism and anticipating the creation of Camera dei Fasci e delle Corporazioni (Chamber of Fasces and Corporations).

The current political representation there is enough, we want a direct representation of individual interests, because I as a citizen, I vote according to my ideas, as a professional, I have to vote according to my professional features. It could be said against this program that goes back to the corporations, it does not matter. This draft of constitution of the Council is of the category that integrates political representation sincerely.

Several other speakers participated including Luigi Razza and Giovanni Marinelli. Michele Bianchi made the only speech that was critical, pointing out that "Everything that modern society has put into effect contains obstacles to maintaining society, which will be eliminated. Perfectly in agreement. Only, before eliminating these, we must create an organization, a system, that we must gear up to replace what we intend to discard".

== Ideology ==
His stated purposes see Mussolini creating the "Third Position" between the two opposite poles above the divergent opinions of the major left-wing and right-wing political parties and the growing modernist theories on "New Man":

We would like to be aristocrats and democrats, conservatives and liberals, reactionaries and revolutionaries, legalists and illegalists, depending on the circumstances of time, place and environment

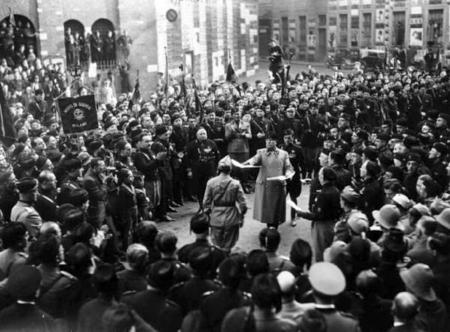
Piazza San Sepolcro, a reunion commemorating the 1919 gathering with Mussolini with the Blackshirts.

The historian Emilio Gentile uses the same expression, "fascist movement", a term already used by Il Popolo d'Italia in 1915 that defines a "new kind of association, the anti-party, formed by free spirits of militant politics rejecting the doctrinal and organizational constraints of a party". Mussolini's movement advocated a nationalist revolution to institute a government that brought the nation a new ruling class, one made up primarily by the "fighters" of World War I disappointed by the Vittoria Mutilata ("Mutilated Victory", a phrase attributed to Gabriele D'Annunzio), which was present to an extent across all parties. This was along with radical claims like Republicanism, anti-parliamentary ideas and anticlerical groups who wanted the government to move to the Italian Socialist Party. The immediate objective of the movement was fighting the irredentist claims concerning Fiume and Dalmatia and the Socialists in general (Bolsheviks), who were at the head of the strikes and labor unrest, often violent over the years 1919–1920, a period known as Biennio Rosso that affected much of Europe. Countering this activity was the rise of the phenomenon of rightwing paramilitary squads, the Squadrismo.

The audience of the movement were first sought in members of the political left, who far from wanting to subvert the state, brought their own demands, and wanted to "socialize from the inside." The Fasci Italiani di Combattimento would serve to unite some of these different worlds: the leftwing interventionists, the Futurists, the former Arditi, the Italian republicans and revolutionary syndicalists. In fact, the majority of the Arditi corps supported the movement from beginning; to chair the meeting, there was the captain of the Arditi, Ferruccio Vecchi, and many other Fascist leaders such as Giuseppe Bottai and Mario Carli.

On June 6, 1919, Il Popolo d'Italia published the Manifesto dei Fasci Italiani di Combattimento, the drafting of which had been done in close collaboration with Alceste De Ambris. It had several proposals for advanced political and social reform in the progressive sense, only some of which were accomplished during the Fascist regime (1922–1943), and later during the Italian Social Republic and the socialization of the economy under Fascism (Socializzazione dell'economia), they were not substantially implemented because of the war. Moreover, Fascism would undergo a rightwards shift as it would work with the Savoyard monarchy, the Roman Catholic Church and the conservatives in establishing a totalitarian one-party dictatorship. In particular, the political reforms foreseen in the manifesto - proportional representation in elections, women's suffrage, and lowering the voting age to 18 - were not realized by the Fascist regime, which sometimes even took measures contrary to them such as the Acerbo law, and would only be implemented decades after the fall of Mussolini by Italian Republic.

== Participants ==
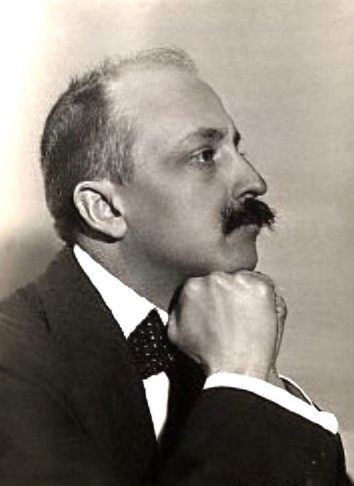
In honour of the Sansepolcrismo assembly of March 23, 1919, Filippo Tommaso Marinetti wrote Il poema dei sansepolcristi (Poem of the Sansepolcristi) in 1939.

Together with Mussolini, one hundred to three hundred people attended the assembly. Among them were Italo Balbo, Emilio De Bono, Michele Bianchi and Cesare Maria De Vecchi, future leaders of the March on Rome; Manlio Morgagni, the future president-general manager of the news agency Agenzia Stefani, and people of different backgrounds, cultural experiences and political views: nationalists, veterans of World War I, Arditi, Futurists, fascist syndicalists, and Italian republicans. According to a police report, there were not more than three hundred people who answered the call of Mussolini by attending the assembly. But later, when Mussolini became head of state, thousands of people claimed the honor of having participated in what was lauded as the founding meeting of Fascism and succeeded in obtaining, somehow, an official recognition of their status as Sansepolcrismo. According to Mussolini, the meeting did not get the desired success. Moreover, in the months after the assembly, with the exception of Milan, it did not gain many new supporters. The Italian general election of 1919 brought a crushing defeat.

Some who attended the meeting later opposed Fascism.

=== Members of the Executive Council of Milan Fascists ===
- Benito Mussolini
- Ferruccio Vecchi
- Enzo Ferrari, lawyer, former member of the executive council of the Fascists of Milan. On May 6, 1919 he became a member and the first national secretary, with responsibility for propaganda.
- Michele Bianchi
- Mario Giampaoli
- Ferruccio Ferradini
- Carlo Meraviglia

=== List of Sansepolcristi ===
- Francesco Angiolini
- Umberto Besana, who soon became part of the Administrative Commission.
- Guido del Latte
- Attilio Longoni, May 6, 1919 became the first national secretary of the Italian Fascist party.
- Celso Morisi, May 6, 1919 became the first member of the National Secretariat as the administrative secretary.
- Cesare Rossi
- Italo Balbo
- Hector Bartolazzi, former editor of the newspaper, La Rivolta (The Revolt) of Lugano (1913).
- Giovanni Capodivacca, editor of Il Popolo d'Italia and in the early 1920s, the protagonist of the political and labor dispute with Mussolini and his newspaper.
- Mario Carli
- Ernesto De Angelis
- Emilio De Bono
- Cesare Maria De Vecchi
- Franco Fiacchi
- Aldo Finzi
- Nicholas Galassi
- Decius Canio Garibaldi
- Domenico Ghetti
- Mario Gioda
- Giovanni Marinelli
- Filippo Tommaso Marinetti
- Manlio Morgagni
- Giacinto Carlo Monzini who, a few days after the meeting, became part of the Commission for Propaganda and the Press.
- Luigi Razza
- Regina Terruzzi

== Sources ==
- Renzo De Felice, Mussolini il rivoluzionario, Einaudi, Torino, 1965, cap. 12 e passim;
- Giorgio Rumi, 'Mussolini e il "programma" di San Sepolcro', Il movimento di liberazione in Italia, aprile-giugno 1963, pp. 3–26;
- Paul O'Brien, Mussolini in the First World War, Berg, Oxford e New York, 2005, cap. 1. ISBN 978-1-84520-052-7
- E. & D. Susmel (a cura di) Opera Omnia di Benito Mussolini, Vol. XII, La Fenice, Firenze, 1953, pp. 321–323.
- Silvano Fasulo, Storia vissuta del socialismo napoletano (1896–1951), con prefazione ed a cura di Giuseppe Aragno, Bulzoni, Roma, 1991. ISBN 978-88-7119-354-0

== See also ==
- Sorelianism
- Squadrismo
- Syndicalism
- Arditi
- Futurism
- Italian Regency of Carnaro
- Fasci Italiani di Combattimento
- Old Bolshevik
- Alter Kämpfer
- Proto-fascism
