= Armando Carlini =

Italian philosopher

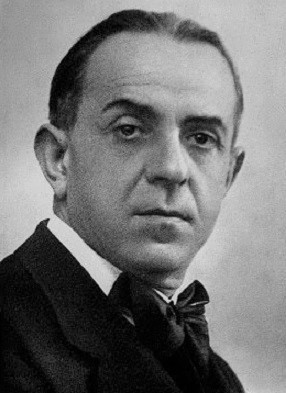
Armando Carlini

Armando Carlini (9 August 1878 – 30 September 1959) was an Italian philosopher and author.

He was born in Naples, Italy. Carlini was a follower of the Fascist philosopher Giovanni Gentile. In 1922 he replaced Gentile in the chair of theoretical philosophy at the University of Pisa. He died in Pisa, Italy.

== Biography ==
Born in Naples, he graduated in University of Bologna first in Literature, then in Philosophy with Francesco Acri. After teaching first Italian and then History of Philosophy in high schools in many cities in Italy (Jesi, Foggia, Cesena, Trani, Parma and Pisa), he was called in 1917 to the University of Pisa to replace Giovanni Gentile, who had recently moved to Rome, first as a lecturer, then as holder of the chair of Theoretical Philosophy (1922).

A few years later he became rector of the University of Pisa (1927 - 1935). Elected deputy (1934 - 1939), he was admitted, on the eve of World War II (1939), to the Royal Academy of Italy, the highest award granted at the time by the Italian fascism of which he was a fervent supporter.

After World War II, having retired from public life and teaching, he devoted himself entirely to philosophical and religious studies and the publication of his latest creations. He died at 81 in Pisa, his adopted city.
