= Agenzia Stefani =

Italian press agency

Agenzia Stefani was the leading press agency in Italy from the mid-19th century until the end of World War II. It was founded by Guglielmo Stefani on 26 January 1853 in Turin, and was closed on 29 April 1945 in Milan.

== History ==
=== Early years ===
Telegrafia privata – Agenzia Stefani (Private Telegraph – Stefani Agency) was created on January 26, 1853, in Turin by Guglielmo Stefani, who was of Venetian origin and was the director of the newspaper Gazzetta Piemontese, with support from Camillo Cavour.

Under the Cavour government, the agency gained huge advantages through the granting of secret funds while the Statuto Albertino banned privileges and private monopolies. The radical press, meanwhile, suffered from restrictions on freedom of information. As well, Agenzia Stefani, being in a monopoly situation, became a government tool for media control of the Kingdom of Sardinia.

After the death of Guglielmo Stefani, in 1861, the agency resurrected its collaboration with British agency Reuters and French agency Agence France-Presse (Havas). It was this, the world's first news agency, that acquired 50% of Agenzia Stefani in 1865.

As an unofficial government agency, the "Stefani" followed different transfers of Italian capital cities, from Turin to Florence in 1865, then to Rome in 1871

=== Under the direction of Friedländer ===
In 1881, Hector Friedländer took control and kept it for 37 years. Under his direction, the agency remained close to the government, contributing strongly to blunting the opinions of the press towards the controversial events of the era, such as Battle of Adwa (1896), Bava-Beccaris massacre (1898), the assassination of Umberto I of Italy (1900), Italo-Turkish War (1911-1912) and the casual changes in international alliances preceding the First World War.

In 1888, Agenzia Stefani was key to Italy's diplomatic strategies; the Triple Alliance potenziamento, coordinated by Prime Minister Francesco Crispi, tried to separate Agenzia Stefani from French influence (by then it was 50%-owned by the French news agency Havas) in favour of an alliance with Prussian and Austro-Hungarian agencies. London, Berlin, and Vienna were involved in negotiations. Crispi wrote, "Stefani is entirely in our hands and benefits morally and materially from the government".

During the course of the 1890s, Francesco Crispi was a promoter of a break with Havas, accused of publishing false and biased news, to encourage the foreign policy of France. A mutual exchange agreement was signed with the German Continentalen, with the Austrian Correspondenz-Office and Reuters, to allow governments to control and censor, if necessary, the news from, and for, abroad.

Throughout the First World War, Agenzia Stefani received exclusive access to the diffusion of the dispatches of army staff, and 1920, an agreement was reached with the Giolitti government, which assigned the task of disseminating government information to the press prefects and government offices. Pursuant to the agreement, the appointment of the director and the major foreign correspondents were subject to government approval. The following year a new agreement with Havas granted it access to information from the United States and Latin America, thanks to cable connections created between New York City and Paris.

=== Management under Morgagni ===
After the rise of fascism, Benito Mussolini grasped the potential usefulness of such a tool and on April 8, 1924, he placed Agenzia Stefani under the control of the sansepolcriste, Manlio Morgagni who, in a short time, transformed the voice of the government within Italy as well as abroad.

The first thing that I read in the morning are the Stefani reports. I also see Morgagni often and willingly.

— Benito Mussolini

In 1924, it had 14 bureaus in Italy, with 160 correspondents in Italy and 12 abroad, who succeeded daily at "working" an average of 165 incoming dispatches and 175 outgoing. Under Morgagni's direction, the agency underwent important development, to the extent that in 1939 there were 32 Italian bureaus and 16 others abroad, with 261 correspondents in Italy and 65 abroad, who every day processed an average of 1270 incoming dispatches and 1215 outgoing.

Following the arrest of Mussolini on July 26, 1943, Manlio Morgagni committed suicide.

=== RSI and ANSA ===
With the creation of the Italian Social Republic, the state took ownership of Agenzia Stefani and its headquarters was moved to Milan, and placed under the direction of Luigi Barzini senior. Its last director, Ernesto Daquanno, was shot at Dongo with the dignitaries accompanying Mussolini.

Dissolved on April 29, 1945, the technical structure and its organization were transferred to the new ANSA.

== See also ==
- History of newspapers and magazines Italy
- History of the Kingdom of Italy (1861–1946)
- News agency

== Bibliography ==
- Mack Smith, Denis. Mazzini (Yale U. Press, 1996) excerpt
- (in Italian) Manlio Morgagni "L'agenzia Stefani nella vita nazionale" (1931) éd. Alfieri e Lacroix, Milan
- (in Italian) Sergio Lepri "Informazione e potere in un secolo di storia italiana. L'Agenzia Stefani da Cavour a Mussolini" (2001) éd. Le Monnier, Florence, ISBN 88-00-85740-X
- (in Italian) Romano Canosa "La voce del Duce. L'agenzia Stefani: l'arma segerta di Mussolini" (2002) éd. Mondadori, Milan
- (in Italian) Gigi Di Fiore "Controstoria dell'unità d'Italia: fatti e misfatti del Risorgimento" (2007) éd. Rizzoli, Milan
