= Francesco Acri =

Italian philosopher and historian of philosophy (1834-1913)

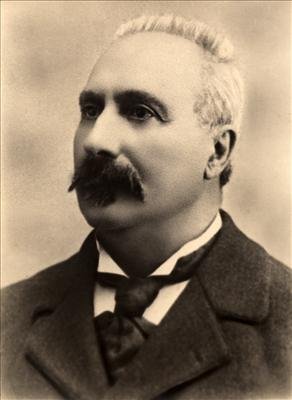
- Born: 19 March 1834; Catanzaro
- Died: 21 November 1913 (aged 79); Bologna
- Occupations: Philosopher & Historian

Francesco Acri (19 March 1834, in Catanzaro – 21 November 1913, in Bologna) was an Italian philosopher and historian of philosophy.

== Biography ==
After graduating with a degree in jurisprudence at Naples in 1857 and studying Aristotle and Kant at Berlin under Friedrich Adolf Trendelenburg, he became a teacher of the history of philosophy, first at the University of Palermo and then, from 1871 at the University of Bologna, where he remained until 1911.

Bound to Rosminian spiritualism, he engaged in invective with the Hegelians and the positivists, in a long dispute with his predecessor in the Bolognese chair, Francesco Fiorentino.

Politically a clerical, he was elected as a city councilor in Bologna in 1895, he campaigned against divorce and for the introduction of the catechism in schools, and was also a strenuous defender of the participation of Catholics in public life.

Among his major scholarly writings, is the translation and commentary on the Dialogues of Plato (various partial editions, collected in three volumes between 1913 and 1915).

His tomb is in the Certosa di Bologna. On the stone dedicated to him, the following memorial is written:

FRANCESCO ACRI DAL 1871 PROFESSORE ALL'UNIVERSITÀ
DI STORIA DELLA FILOSOFIA
NOBILE CUORE E ALTO INGEGNO
PADRE TRA I FIGLIUOLI E I NIPOTI SUOI
PADRE TRA GLI SCOLARI
SPECULATORE DI VERITÀ SEGUACE DI BONTÀ
AMICO DI BELLEZZA
FILOSOFO E ARTISTA
ITALIANO DI ANIMA E DI LINGUA
DEVOTO A PLATONE A TOMMASO A DANTE
DALLA FEDE
A CUI GLI PARVE FACILE CONCILIARE LA SCIENZA
IN CUI RIPOSÒ L'INTELLETTO E L'AFFETTO

Francesco Acri, University Professor in the History of Philosophy from 1871, noble in heart and lofty in genius, father to his sons and nephews, father to his pupils, investigator of truth, follower of goodness, friend of beauty, philosopher and artist, Italian in spirit and tongue, devoted to Plato, Thomas, Dante, One of the faith, to which he seemed to easily combine science, in which he rested erudition and affection

== Works ==
- Abbozzo d'una teorica delle idee [Sketch of a Theory of Ideas], Palermo, 1870
- Della teoria dell'idee secondo Giambattista Vico [On the Theory of Ideas, According to Giambattista Vico], Bologna, 1873
- Dell'insegnamento di religione nelle scuole primarie: lettera del prof. Acri ai membri del Congresso pedagogico di Bologna [On the Teaching of Religion in Primary Schools: Letters of Prof. Acri to the Members of the Bologna Education Board], Modena, 1874
- Della relazione fra la coscienza e il corpo secondo le dottrine chiamate positive [On the Relation between the Mind and the Body According to the Doctrines called Positivist], Bologna, 1880
- La Eucarestia e la scienza [The Eucharist and Science], Chieti, 1897
- Videmus in aenigmate: delle idee e prima della relazione tra la coscienza e il corpo secondo i filosofi naturali We see in Obscurity: On ideas and prior relations between the mind and the body according to natural philosophy, Bologna, 1907
- Amore, dolore, fede [Love, Pain, Faith], Bologna, 1908
- San Tommaso e Aristotele [Saint Thomas Aquinas & Aristotle], Bologna, 1908
- Dialettica turbata [Dialectic Disturbed], Bologna, 1911
- Dialettica serena, [Dialectic at Peace]Rocca San Casciano, 1917 (posthumous)

== Translation ==
- Plato, Dialogues, 1913–15, 3 vol.

== Bibliography ==
- Anile, Antonino (1924). Francesco Acri: il filosofo, il cristiano. Roma: Libreria Ed. religiosa Ferrari.
- S. Blasucci, Francesco Acri: la fortuna e l'opera, Roma-Bari, 1992
- F. Farnè, Il problema esistenziale nel pensiero di Francesco Acri, L'Aquila, 1984
- L. Malusa, Persona, sistema e sviluppo della filosofia nella storiografia filosofica di Francesco Acri, in «AA. VV., Vetera novis augere. Studi in onore di C. Giacon», Roma, 1982
- L. Monetti, Saggio sul pensiero filosofico di Francesco Acri, Torino, 1957
- Renato Serra, Francesco Acri, in Scritti, t. II, G De Robertis, A Grilli (ed.s), Firenze, Le Monnier, 1938
