= Critica fascista =

Cultural and political magazine in Italy (1923–1943)

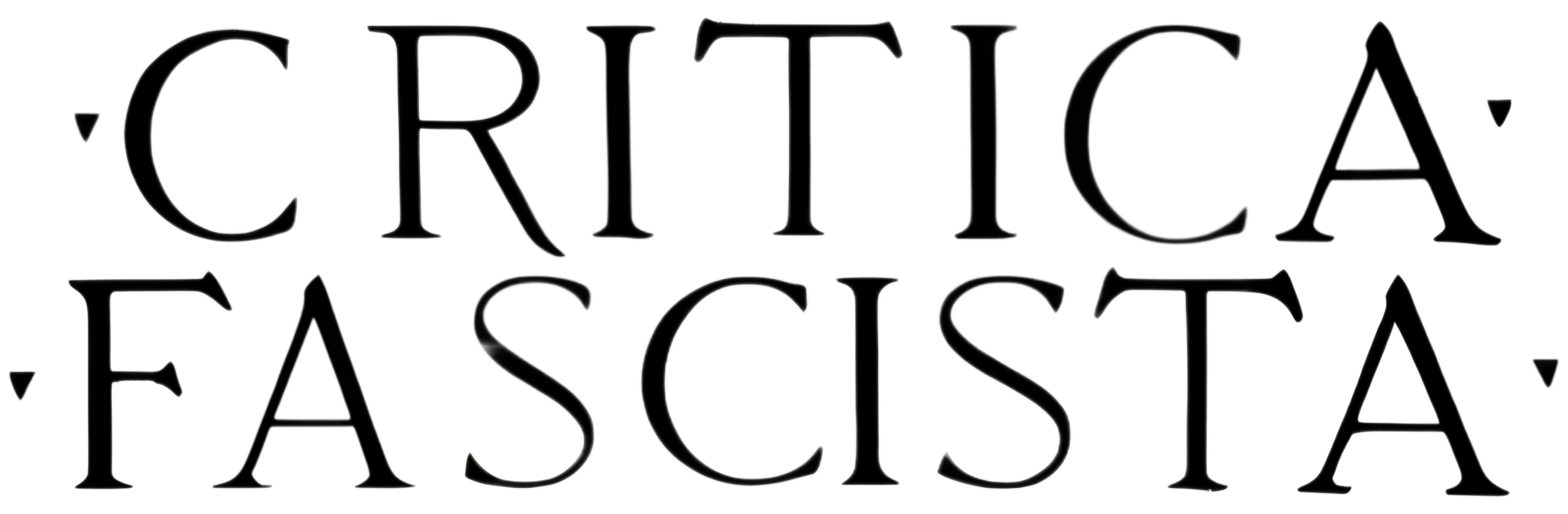
- Categories: Cultural magazine; Political magazine
- Frequency: Biweekly
- Founder: Giuseppe Bottai
- Founded: 15 June 1923
- Final issue Number: 15 July 1943; 21
- Country: Italy
- Based in: Rome
- Language: Italian
- ISSN: 1124-3090
- OCLC: 436549849

Critica fascista was a biweekly cultural magazine which was founded and edited by Giuseppe Bottai in Rome, Italy. The magazine existed during the Fascist rule in the country from 1923 to 1943. Over time it became one of the most significant publications of the fascist period in Italy.

== History and profile ==
Critica fascista was founded in 1923 by Italian journalist Giuseppe Bottai in Rome. It was published on a biweekly basis and edited by Giuseppe Bottai during its lifetime. The goal of Bottai was to provide a platform for the Fascist government to develop a cultural policy through intellectual and artistic discussions. The magazine also aimed at educating the emerging ruling class and at initiating a discussion on the nature of Fascist ideology. It adopted revisionism which had appeared as a new ideology of the Italian Fascism.

Between 1926 and 1927 Critica fascista published various articles on the definition and scope of the state art in an attempt to help the Fascist authorities in developing the related concepts. The magazine adopted an anti-capitalist stance. Its notable contributors included Ardengo Soffici, Mino Maccari, Gino Severini, Massimo Bontempelli, Cipriano Efisio Oppo, Curzio Malaparte, Filippo Tommaso Marinetti, Anton Giulio Bragaglia, Umberto Fracchia and Emilio Cecchi. In the early 1930s Giuseppe Bottai and other Fascist figures frequently published articles in the magazine about the need for the modernization in all aspects of Italian life.

Critica fascista folded in 1943, and the last issue was number 21.

For digitized views of the magazine, see the Emeroteca of the Biblioteca Nazionale Centrale di Roma.
