= Giorgio Pini =

Italian politician and journalist

Giorgio Pini (1 February 1899 – 30 March 1987) was an Italian politician and journalist.

== Biography ==
Pini was born in 1899 in Bologna, studied law at the University of Bologna and served in World War I before joining the Bologna fascio in 1920. Following the establishment of the fascist state, he became an important figure in the journalists syndicate along with the likes of Lando Ferretti and Telesio Interlandi. As a journalist he made his name as an editor for il Resto del Carlino (1928–1930) and Il Gazzettino (1936) before graduating to the editorship of Il Popolo d'Italia in December 1936. He retained this post until 1943, although in the Italian Social Republic Pini, who was a noted moderate, returned to the local Resto. He did however serve as an undersecretary in the Ministry of the Interior in 1944.

Pini was most noted in Fascist Italy for his biography of Benito Mussolini, a hagiography from which Il Duce profited financially. It was translated by Luigi Villari into English as The Official Life on Benito Mussolini in 1939. After the Second World War he released an updated version of this book with Duilio Susmel whilst in 1950 he published Itinerario Tragica 1943/44 which was also pro-fascist in nature. His continuing justifications for fascism led him to far right politics in the post-war era and he was a founding member of the Italian Social Movement (MSI). Within the MSI he was part of the 'left-wing' tendency that sought to add socialist economics to their rhetoric and when his position was not adopted he left in January 1952 to help launch the Raggruppamento Sociale Repubblicano with Concetto Pettinato. Pini continued his career on the socialist fringes of the far right and frequently attacked the MSI in later years for forging links to regimes in Greece, South Africa and Portugal that he dismissed as reactionary.

Pini died aged 88 in 1987 in Bologna.
