= Sacrario militare dei Caduti Oltremare =

Military cemetery in Bari, Italy

- Italy
- For Italian soldiers who died overseas
- Unveiled: 10 December 1967 (inaugurated)
- Location: 41°6′32″N 16°54′15″E
- Designed by: Arnaldo Tulzi and Giuseppe Triggiani

The Sacrario dei Caduti Oltremare (War Memorial of the Fallen Overseas) is a World War II memorial located in the city of Bari, in the Apulia region of Southern Italy. The shrine, inaugurated in 1967, houses the remains of 75,098 Italian soldiers killed overseas (North Africa, East Africa and the Balkans) in both World Wars as well as in Italy's colonial wars (most of those buried in the shrine died in World War II).

The burials, of whom 29,051 are known, 5,675 known but not identified, and 40,372 unknown, are divided in ten sectors, each of them corresponding to a different theatre and/or time period: Jugoslavia 1940–1945, Libya 1911–1939, Libya 1940–1943, Albania 1915–1918, Greece and Albania 1940–1945, Morocco 1940–1943, East Africa, Tunisia 1940–1943, Algeria 1940–1943, North Africa 1940–1943.

The fallen buried in the war memorial include eleven generals and admirals (among them General Giuseppe Tellera (1882–1941 †), the highest ranking Italian officer killed in action in World War II), 192 recipients of the Gold Medal of Military Valor, and 140 Eritrean and Libyan Askari whose remains were moved to Italy in 1972 after the decommissioning of the Tripoli War Memorial, together with the remains of the Italian soldiers buried there.

The memorial also includes a museum illustrating Italy's wars and military campaigns between 1882 and 1945, containing many war relics, uniforms, weapons, and documents.
