= Piazza San Sepolcro =

Square in Milan, Italy

Coordinates: 45°27′47″N 9°11′07″E

The Piazza San Sepolcro (Italian pronunciation: [ˈpjattsa san seˈpolkro]) is a piazza in the center of Milan not far from the Piazza del Duomo.

During the Roman period the piazza was the forum at the intersection of the cardo and the decumanus. In 1030 the Church of San Sepolcro was founded, giving the piazza its name.

On March 23, 1919 Benito Mussolini founded the Fasci di combattimento at a rally held at the piazza. Participants of this rally were known as sansepolcristi, and were granted special privileges under the regime. The square was adjacent to the Palazzo Castani, the national headquarters of the Partito Nazional Fascista from 1921 to 1924, and of the Partito Fascista Repubblicano from 1943 to 1945.

The term Sansepolcrismo, however, pointed to the original spirit of the movement of Fasci di combattimento in which, alongside nationalist ideas and combative myths, there were strong instances of social palingenesis, egalitarianism and even republican components.

Futurist poet Filippo Tommaso Marinetti composed "Il poema dei sansepolcristi" in commemoration of the event.

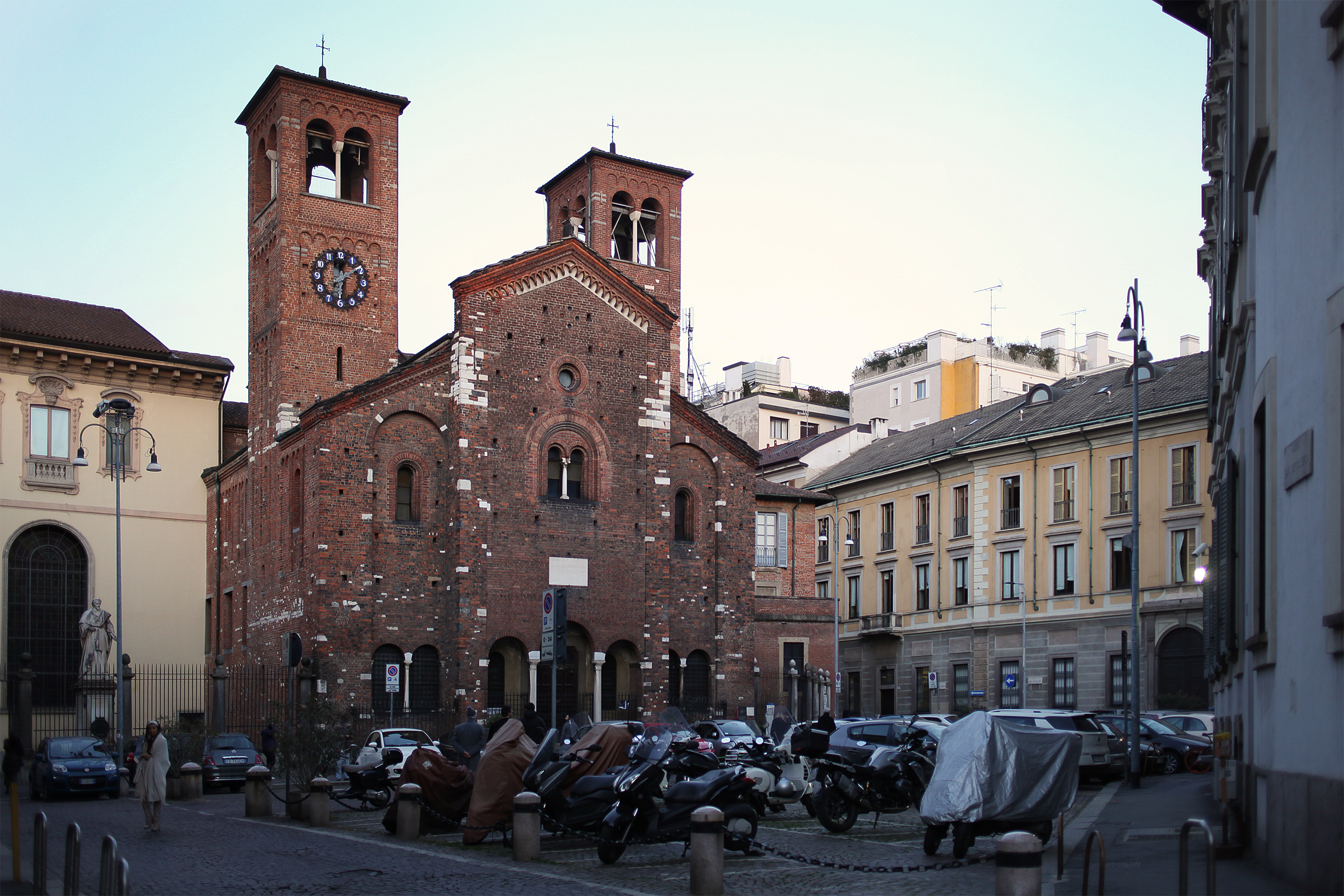
Veduta di piazza San Sepolcro, Milano con la chiesa
