= Mario Carli =

Italian poet, novelist, essayist and journalist

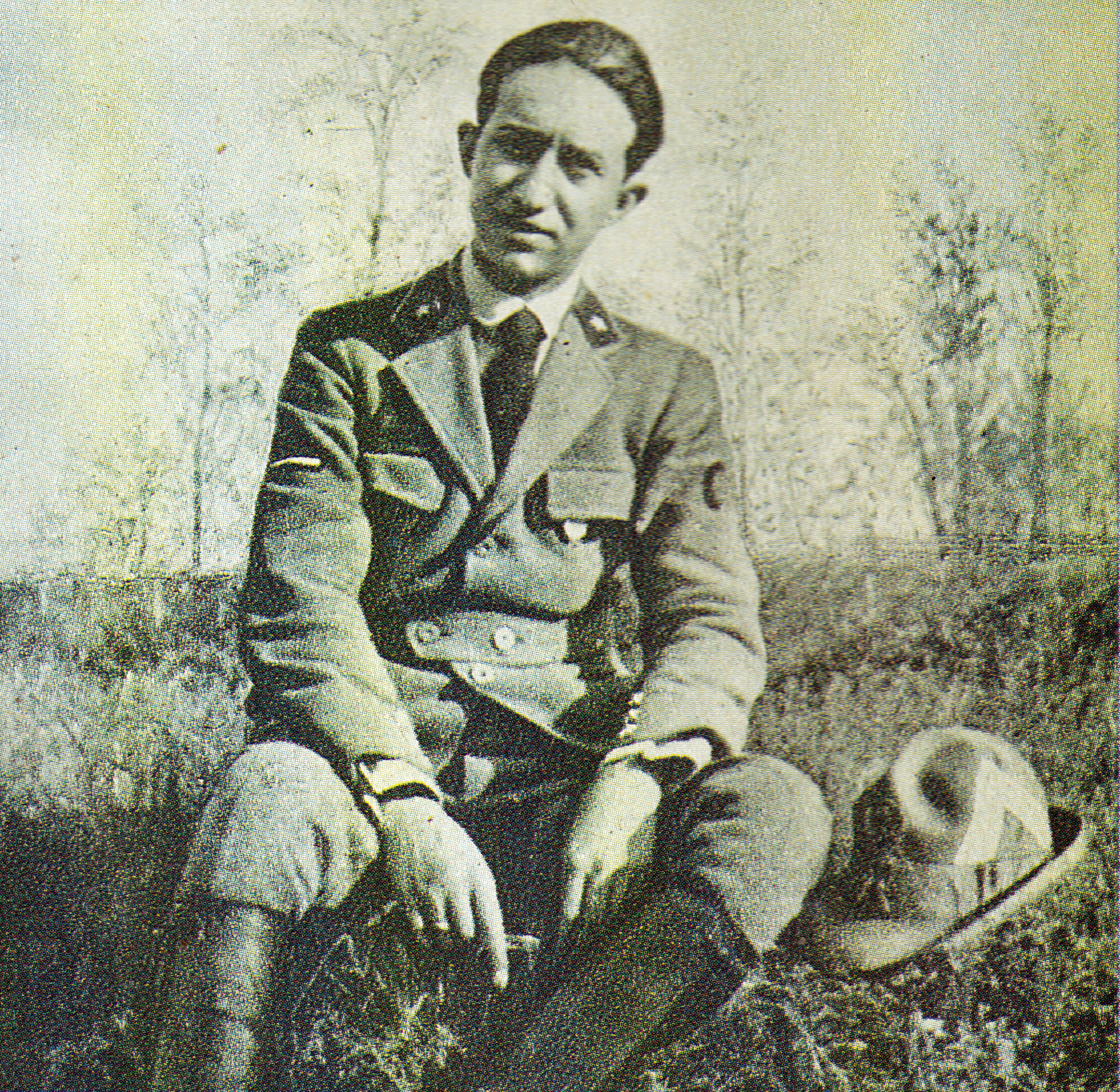
Mario Carli

Mario Carli (31 December 1889 – 9/10 September 1935) was an Italian poet, novelist, essayist and journalist.

== Biography ==
Carli was born in San Severo, Apulia, to Florentine father and Apulian mother.

He spent his formative years in Florence, where he met Filippo Tommaso Marinetti in the 1910s, and adhered to Futurism as a member of the so-called pattuglia azzurra ("Azure platoon"). After fighting in World War I, he engaged in favor of the Arditi, and reached Gabriele D'Annunzio during the latter's political experiment in occupied Fiume in 1919. Carli then supported the militant anti-fascist Arditi del Popolo, created in 1920.

A successful journalist, Carli adhered to Benito Mussolini's Fascist movement the moment it started; he and his friend Emilio Settimelli published the intimidating newspaper L’Impero. Nonetheless, he proved to be a dissident, and joined the field of those considered "left-wing fascists". In the 1930s, Carli was Italy's consul general in Porto Alegre, Brazil.

Tormented by illness, he died prematurely in Rome.

== Works ==
Carli wrote extensively, producing works like the experimental novel Retroscena ("Background"; 1915), and the memoir Con d’Annunzio a Fiume ("With D’Annunzio in Fiume"; 1920). In 1923 he published La mia divinità ("My Divinity"), a text in which he gathered his poetry, small poems in prose among which stands out Notti filtrate ("Filtered Nights") - a pre-Surrealist piece of importance.

The writings express Carli's conviction in life as energy, an egoistical effort at realising oneself against all odds and perils.
