= Giuseppe Bottai =

Italian journalist, university professor, and Fascist politician (1895–1959)

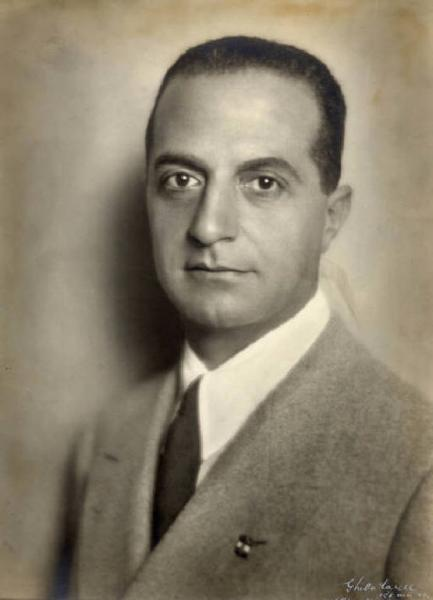
- Giuseppe Bottai as Minister of Education, 1937

Minister of National Education
- In office 15 November 1936 – 5 February 1943
- Prime Minister: Benito Mussolini
- Preceded by: Cesare Maria De Vecchi
- Succeeded by: Carlo Alberto Biggini

Governor of Addis Ababa
- In office 5 May 1936 – 27 May 1936
- Monarch: Victor Emmanuel III
- Preceded by: Office established
- Succeeded by: Alfredo Siniscalchi

Governor of Rome
- In office 23 January 1935 – 15 November 1936
- Preceded by: F. Boncompagni Ludovisi
- Succeeded by: Piero Colonna

Minister of Corporations
- In office 12 September 1929 – 20 July 1932
- Prime Minister: Benito Mussolini
- Preceded by: Alessandro Martelli
- Succeeded by: Benito Mussolini

Member of the Chamber of Fasces and Corporations
- In office 23 March 1939 – 5 August 1943
- Appointed by: Benito Mussolini

Member of the Chamber of Deputies
- In office 11 June 1921 – 2 March 1939
- Constituency: Lazio

Personal details
- Born: 3 September 1895 Rome, Italy
- Died: 9 January 1959 (aged 63) Rome, Italy
- Party: FIC (1919–1921); PNF (1921–1943)
- Height: 1.77 m (5 ft 10 in)
- Education: Sapienza University of Rome
- Profession: Journalist, soldier

Military service
- Allegiance: Kingdom of Italy; Free France
- Branch/service: Royal Italian Army; French Foreign Legion
- Years of service: 1915–1917; 1935–1936; 1943–1948
- Rank: Sergeant; Brigadier; Major; Private
- Unit: 1st Cavalry Regiment (France)
- Battles/wars: First World War; Second Italo-Ethiopian War; Second World War

Giuseppe Bottai (3 September 1895 – 9 January 1959) was an Italian journalist and member of the National Fascist Party of Benito Mussolini.

== Early life ==
Born in Rome, Bottai was son of Luigi Bottai, a wine dealer with republican sympathies, and Elena Cortesia. He graduated at Liceo Torquato Tasso and attended the Sapienza University of Rome until the 1915, when Italy declared war to the Central Powers. The same year, he left his studies to enlist himself in the Italian Royal Army. Wounded in battle, he obtained a Medal of Military Valor after World War I.

In 1919, Bottai met Benito Mussolini during a Futurist meeting, and contributed to establish the Fasci Italiani di Combattimento (Italian Fasces of Combat). In 1921, Bottai ended his studies at law faculty and became a freemason, member of the Gran Loggia d'Italia. At the same time, he also started a journalist career in the Il Popolo d'Italia, the newspaper of the recently founded National Fascist Party. During the March on Rome, Bottai was along with Ulisse Igliori and Gino Calza-Bini the head of the Roman squadrismo, supporting the Blackshirts' political violence.

== Political career ==
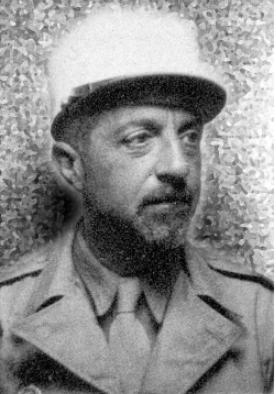
Bottai serving in the French Foreign Legion

After the 1921 Italian general election, Bottai was elected in the Chamber of Deputies for the National Blocs. In 1923, he became leader of the intransigent national syndicalist and revolutionary faction of fascism. To support his ideas, Bottai founded Critica fascista (Fascist Critic), a cultural periodical, co-operating with other left-leaning fascists like Filippo De Pisis, Renato Guttuso, and Mario Mafai. Starting in 1930, he contributed to the political and finance magazine Lo Stato.

Bottai worked to the Ministry of Corporations, introducing the Labour Charter and planning a Corporative Academic Pole in Pisa, from 1926 to 1932, when he was excluded by Mussolini from the Ministry. In 1933, Bottai established and chaired the National Institute of the Social Security (Italian: Istituto nazionale della previdenza sociale, INPS). He was appointed governor of Rome (1935–1936) but resigned to fight in the Second Italo-Ethiopian War with the rank of major. On 5 May 1936, Bottai and Pietro Badoglio entered in Addis Abeba, and Bottai was appointed as vice governor. After the war, Bottai returned in Rome to be Education Minister. During his ministry, Bottai proclaimed a law (the Bottai Law) on safeguarding public and cultural heritage and the preservation of natural beauties. He also co-worked with art critics Giulio Carlo Argan and Cesare Brandi to improve the Italian cultural life.

In the late 1930s, Bottai became more radical and a Germanophile. In 1938, he expressed support to racial laws against Italian Jews, and in 1940 founded Primato (Primacy), a magazine that supported the Aryan race's supremacy and interventionism in the war. Bottai thought that the "Fascist Revolution" was incomplete and that what was needed was a return to the original and more "pure" fascism.

== World War II ==
The Italian intervention in World War II resulted in disaster. The Campaign on the Eastern Front caused the death or the injury of approximately 77,000 soldiers, with more than 39,000 injured. Bottai voted for Mussolini's arrest, which had been proposed by Dino Grandi, on 25 July 1943 after Italy's defeat had become evident. In 1944, the Italian Social Republic condemned Bottai to death, during the Verona trial, but Bottai hid in a Roman convent. In 1944, Bottai enlisted in the French Foreign Legion with the pseudonym Andrea Battaglia. He fought in Provence during Operation Dragoon and then in the Western Allied invasion of Germany.

== Later life ==
After the war, Bottai remained in France and continued to serve in the Foreign Legion until 1948, when he was discharged. For his role in the final stages of World War II, he got an amnesty for his role in fascism. Returning in Italy in 1953, Bottai founded the periodical ABC (not to be confused with the magazine with the same name) and Il Popolo di Roma, which was financed by ex-fascist Vittorio Cini, who supported centrist and conservative views. Bottai died in Rome in 1959. At his funeral was Aldo Moro who, like Moro's father, had been Bottai's friend and assistant during his career.

== Bibliography ==
- Trade organisation in Italy under the act and regulations on collective relations in connection with employment
- Economia fascista (1930)
- Grundprinzipien des korporativen Aufbaus in Italien (1933)
- Esperienza corporativa (1929–1935) (1935)
- Corporazioni (1935)
- Scritti giuridici in onore di Santi Romano ... (1940)
- Funzione di Roma nella vita culturale e scientifica della nazione (1940)
- Pagine di critica fascista (1915–1926) (1941, edited by F. M. Pacces)
- Romanità e germanesimo: letture tenute per il Lyceum di Firenze (1941, edited by Jolanda de Blasi)
- Von der römischen zur faschistischen Korporation (1942)
- Köpfe des risorgimento (1943)
- Contributi all'elaborazione delle scienze corporative (1939-XVIII—1942-XX) (1943)
- Vent 'anni e un giorno, 24 luglio 1943 (1949). Republished as Vent'anni e un giorno (24 luglio 1943) (1977).
- Legione è il mio nome (1950). Republished as Legione è il mio nome: il coraggioso epilogo di un gerarca del fascismo (I memoriali) (1999, edited by Marcello Staglieno)
- Scritti (1965, edited by Roberto Bartolozzi and Riccardo Del Giudice)
- Diario, 1935–1944 (1982, edited by Giordano Bruno Guerri)
- Carteggio 1940–1957, correspondence between Bottai and Don Giuseppe De Luca; edited by Renzo De Felice and Renato Moro (1989)
- La politica delle arti: Scritti, 1918–1943 (1992, edited by Alessandro Masi).
- Quaderni giovanili: 1915–1920 (Atti testimonianze convegni) (1996).
