= Luigi Stefanini =

Italian philosopher and educationist (1891–1956)

- Born: November 3, 1891; Treviso, Italy
- Died: January 16, 1956; Padua, Italy
- Occupation: Philosopher

Luigi Stefanini (1891–1956) was an Italian philosopher.
