= Fasci Italiani di Combattimento =

Political party in Italy (1919–1921)

- Leader: Benito Mussolini
- Secretary: Michele Bianchi; Attilio Longoni; Umberto Pasella
- Founder: Benito Mussolini; Filippo Tommaso Marinetti; Giuseppe Ungaretti
- Founded: 23 March 1919
- Dissolved: 9 November 1921
- Merger of: Futurist Political Party
- Preceded by: Fasci d'Azione Rivoluzionaria
- Succeeded by: National Fascist Party; National Fasces (dissident minority)
- Headquarters: Via Paolo da Cannobbio, Milan
- Newspaper: Il Fascio
- Paramilitary wing: Action squads (Note: The squadre d'azione ('action squads') were also known as Squadristi ('Squadists') and later as Blackshirts.)
- Membership: 187,588 (May 1921)
- Ideology: Italian nationalism Revolutionary nationalism Futurism; National syndicalism (Note: Anti-capitalism; Anti-communism; Anti-socialism); Sansepolcrismo
- Political position: Syncretic (Note: The party initially promoted syncretic policies (as expressed in the Programme of San Sepolcro) in an attempt to gain supporters from both the right and the left. The disastrous results of the November 1919 elections, caused the party to reorient itself to the right. § Reorientation and rise) (until November 1919); Right-wing to far-right (Note: After the party joined the anti-socialist National Bloc, allying with the Nationalists and the Liberals, the party completely abandoned its originally syncretic positions.)
- Electoral alliance: Ardito-Futurist-Fascist list (Note: Filippo T. Marinetti agreed on an alliance of the Fasci Politici Futuristi, the Associazione fra gli Arditi, and the Fasci Italiani di Combattimento to form a list for the national elections of 16 November 1919.) (1919); National Bloc (1921)
- Colours: Black

The Fasci Italiani di Combattimento (English: Italian Fasces of Combat, also translatable as 'Italian Fighting Bands' or 'Italian Fighting Leagues') was an Italian fascist organisation created by Benito Mussolini in 1919. It was the successor of the Fasci d'Azione Rivoluzionaria, being notably further right than its predecessor. The Fasci Italiani di Combattimento was reorganised into the National Fascist Party in 1921.

The Fasci Italiani di Combattimento was founded by Mussolini and his supporters in the aftermath of World War I, at a meeting held in Milan in March 1919. It was an ultranationalist organisation that intended to appeal to war veterans from across the political spectrum, at first without a clear political orientation. It was closely associated with Mussolini's newspaper, Il Popolo d'Italia, and Mussolini served as the leader (Duce) of the movement throughout its existence.

After a very poor result in the Italian election of 1919, in which no members of the Fasci were elected to any office, the organisation moved further to the right and developed a reputation for using paramilitary violence against its political opponents, especially members of the Italian Socialist Party. Through the support of its blackshirts militia and a political alliance with the government of Giovanni Giolitti and the Italian Nationalist Association, the Fasci was able to enter the Italian Parliament for the first time after the election of 1921. In November of that year, the Fasci Italiani di Combattimento renamed and restructured itself as the National Fascist Party.

== History ==
=== Background ===
Benito Mussolini fought in the Royal Italian Army during World War I until he was wounded in February 1917 and discharged from the army after six months in the hospital. After making his way back to Milan, Mussolini returned to the position of chief editor of Il Popolo d'Italia, the newspaper he had originally founded in November 1914 to advocate for Italian entry into the war. The readership of the newspaper had declined in his absence, but Mussolini successfully revived the paper with a focus on war commentary. He sought to appeal to the former members and supporters of the Fasci d'Azione Rivoluzionaria, who had been ardent pro-war activists under his leadership in 1915. Mussolini envisioned a new political movement led by war veterans, argued that only those who had fought for their country were fit to govern, and called for a "government by men in the trenches" who would become a new ruling class, the "aristocracy of tomorrow".

In 1917 and 1918, as the war continued, Mussolini and Il Popolo d'Italia received great funding from major arms manufacturers and businessmen in Milan. Historian Denis Mack Smith writes that "possibly this inflow of money from big business in no way affected the politics of his paper", but that Mussolini's enemies asked, "why these firms would support such a small newspaper unless it was for services rendered."

In 1919, after the end of World War I, the Treaty of Saint-Germain resulted in Italy obtaining South Tyrol, Trentino, Istria, Trieste, and Zara from Austria-Hungary. Italian nationalists also wanted Fiume and the region of Dalmatia on the Adriatic coast; hence they felt treated unfairly and spoke of a "mutilated victory". The Italian special forces from the war, known as the Arditi, were angry about the problems in Italy. Mussolini sympathised with them, claiming he shared their war experiences; hence they joined his movement, eventually becoming the Squadrismo.

Mussolini used his newspaper in 1919 to espouse an eclectic mix of "dramatic and eye-catching" proposals inspired by views from across the political spectrum, as he was "far more concerned with tactics than with ideas" and discovered that inconsistency did not bother his readers. Mussolini at this time "appeared successively as champion of the League and then nationalist, as socialist and then conservative, as a monarchist and then republican" and actively wished to keep all his political options open.

=== Foundation of the Fasci ===
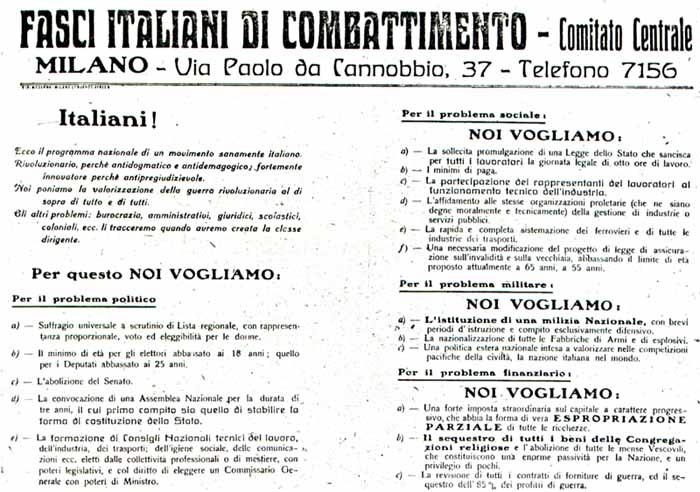
The manifesto of the Fasci Italiani di Combattimento, as published in Il Popolo d'Italia

The Fasci Italiani di Combattimento was founded by Mussolini and a group of between fifty and two hundred supporters who met in a hall provided by Milanese businessmen in the Piazza San Sepolcro on 23 March 1919. There was a great deal of confusion regarding what the new organisation officially stood for. In general, its stances were radically different from those of later fascism, as the early Fasci proclaimed its opposition to censorship, militarism and dictatorship. Mussolini wrote that "we are libertarians above all, loving liberty for everyone, even for our enemies". On the same occasion, he also said that freedom of thought and speech were among the "highest expressions of human civilization".

Mussolini gave two speeches at the meeting on 23 March 1919, which contained a catch-all series of proposals intended to appeal to both the left and the right. For the left, there were proposals to make Italy a republic based on equal suffrage for both sexes (at the time, only men could vote), to introduce referendums, to abolish the Senate, and to eliminate all titles based on caste or class, among others. For the right, Mussolini endorsed nationalist claims over Fiume and Dalmatia, and the Fasci proposed to take the government out of business and transfer large segments of the economy from public to private control.

The manifesto of the Fasci Italiani di Combattimento was published on the following day in Mussolini's newspaper Il Popolo d'Italia, which was closely connected to it. However, Il Popolo d'Italia was not the official newspaper of the Fasci and always remained a separate organisation from it; the official publication of the movement was the weekly newspaper Il Fascio, which was established sometime later when its publication became financially viable.

Soon after its foundation, the Fasci Italiani di Combattimento began engaging in political violence against its enemies. On 15 April 1919, the offices and printing equipment of the main socialist newspaper, Avanti!, were attacked and destroyed by a group of fascists led by Marinetti and Ferruccio Vecchi. Mussolini himself did not claim responsibility for the attack, but he defended it and considered it "the first material achievement of the fascist revolution". On 9 and 10 October, the 1st Congress was held in Florence.

In November 1919, parliamentary elections were held in Italy. The Fasci Italiani di Combattimento allowed each of its local branches to approach the election however it saw fit. Many local branches decided on their own electoral program, some moving sharply to the right, although Mussolini and his Milan branch put forward a leftist and anti-clerical program. This was an attempt to win votes away from the socialists, but it proved to be an electoral disaster when Mussolini and his party gathered fewer than 5,000 votes, compared to 190,000 votes for the socialists in Milan alone. The election result was so dismal that even in Mussolini's home village of Predappio, not a single person voted for him. In a mock funeral procession after the election, members of the Italian Socialist Party carried a coffin that bore Mussolini's name, parading it past his apartment to symbolise the end of his political career.

=== Reorientation and rise ===
After the disastrous results in the November 1919 election, the membership of the Fasci dwindled, with fewer than 4,000 members left by the end of the year. Mussolini briefly considered leaving politics, emigrating away from Italy and pursuing a career in writing fiction. However, it soon became apparent that the newly elected parliament was unable to form any governing coalition. The largest party were the Socialists, a situation that alarmed the conservatives and made them seek new political allies to block any potential socialist government. Mussolini saw an opportunity to re-orient the Fasci towards an alliance with the traditional political right and decided to remain in politics.

Through a newspaper campaign in favour of increased armaments and a larger merchant marine, Mussolini and the Fasci gained new subsidies from business groups. They also declared themselves in support of Gabriele D'Annunzio's seizure of power in the city of Fiume, and asked for public donations to support D'Annunzio. This money never reached D'Annunzio and was appropriated by the Fasci for their own purposes. During the Biennio Rosso, in the summer of 1920, a wave of strikes and factory occupations by socialist workers further persuaded industrialists and landowners to provide financial support to the fascist movement. The Fasci established new branches across the country and greatly expanded their paramilitary militia known as the blackshirts. Under the pretence of saving the country from communism, they launched a wave of violence in the winter of 1920–21.

By the autumn of 1920, the Fasci had shifted focus to the countryside, where they presented themselves as the most determined opposition to the socialists and the only ones willing to engage in acts of violence. The fascists recruited heavily from the countryside, and their membership grew tenfold during the last seven months of 1920. They increasingly made use of squads partially composed of military veterans and often led by former army officers to carry out "punitive expeditions" to sack socialist headquarters and break up trade unions.

Mussolini himself had relatively little control over the fascist armed squads at this time, but he used them to project an image of strength at the negotiating table with other political parties. For the elections of May 1921, the Fasci entered into a coalition with the government of Giovanni Giolitti, who believed that he could use them against the socialists and the newly founded Italian Communist Party. The coalition led by Giolitti was called the National Bloc, and Mussolini presented his Fasci as representing the "extreme right-wing" of this group; this was the first time that he identified himself as being on the extreme right. He began to speak of Italians as being a superior race and said that "fascist foreign policy was summed up in the words 'imperialism' and 'national expansion'".

The elections took place in a climate of violence. Since the fascists were now in a coalition with the government, they were allowed to break the law and intimidate their opponents with impunity. The police sometimes lent their trucks to fascist squads, army units sometimes gave them weapons, and judges usually found them innocent of charges brought against them. Some parts of the country were under effective fascist control by election day. In consequence, the Fasci Italiani di Combattimento had a much better electoral result than in 1919, but still only received 7% of the vote and 35 seats in parliament (out of 535 total); the pro-fascist Italian Nationalist Association won 10 seats.

Although the number of fascists in parliament was small, one of the elected fascist deputies was Mussolini himself, and this gave him a platform to increase his public profile and to exert more influence over the regional and local Fasci leaders. It also gave him immunity from prosecution, which was important because there was a pending criminal case against him.

A few months later, Mussolini decided to transform the relatively decentralised Fasci Italiani di Combattimento into a more tightly organised political party under his control. Thus, in November 1921, the Fasci was renamed and reorganised as the National Fascist Party.

== Electoral results ==
=== Italian Parliament ===
Election	Leader	Chamber of Deputies				
Election	Leader	Votes	%	Seats	+/–	Position
1921 (Note: In the 1921 election, 35 FIC members were elected within the National Bloc list, while 2 candidates were elected outside the coalition, running solely as FIC members.)	Benito Mussolini	Into National Bloc		37 / 535	▲37	–
1921	Benito Mussolini	29,549	0.45	37 / 535	▲37	▲15th
