= Il Popolo d'Italia =

Italian fascist newspaper (1914–1943)

- Founder(s): Benito Mussolini; Manlio Morgagni
- Publisher: Benito Mussolini (1914–1922); National Fascist Party (1922–1943)
- Founded: 15 November 1914
- Ceased publication: 24 July 1943
- Political alignment: Italian fascism
- Language: Italian
- Headquarters: Via Lovanio 10, Milan (since 1923)
- Country: Kingdom of Italy
- Circulation: 230,000 (as of 1939)

Il Popolo d'Italia (Italian: [il ˈpɔpolo d‿iˈtalja]; lit. 'The People of Italy') was an Italian newspaper published from 15 November 1914 until 24 July 1943. It was founded by Benito Mussolini as a pro-war newspaper during World War I, and it later became the main newspaper of the fascist movement in Italy after the war. It published editions every day with the exception of Mondays.

== Founding and First World War ==
The paper was founded in Milan in November 1914, with the aim of supporting Italian entry into World War I. In November 1914 the entrepreneur Giuseppe Pontremoli, a 33rd degree Freemason of the Ancient and Accepted Scottish Rite, advanced 20,000 lire for the purchase of the rotary press with which the new newspaper was printed.

The war had started several months previously, but Italy was neutral at the time and would remain so until May 1915. Il Popolo d'Italia, advocating militarism and irredentism, received financial backing from major companies including Ansaldo and others, especially from the sugar and electrical industries, who wished for Italy to join the war. The paper was also subsidized by government-backed sources in France, on the pretext of influencing Italy to join the Entente Powers in the war. In the paper's early period, during World War I, the masthead of the newspaper carried quotes from Louis Auguste Blanqui ("Whoever has steel has bread") and Napoleon Bonaparte ("The Revolution is an idea which has found bayonets!").

Investigations to identify the sources of funding for the Mussolini newspaper continued even after the World War. The documents found testify both of the provenance and the financiers. In 1917 the United Kingdom financed the newspaper: Mussolini made a commitment, for the sum of 100 pounds a week, to boycott any pacifist demonstrations in Italy. Today the documents found attest to the payment of contributions from Italian industrialists interested in increasing military expenses for Italy's desired entry into the war; among these stand out the names of Carlo Esterle (Edison company), Emilio Bruzzone (Società siderurgica di Savona and Italian Society for the Indigenous Sugar Industry, of which Eridania was the most important member), Giovanni Agnelli (Fiat), Pio Perrone (Ansaldo) and Emanuele Vittorio Parodi (Acciaierie Odero).

== Inter-war period ==
The newspaper's logo as it appeared on its front page

After the war, Il Popolo d'Italia became associated with the new Fascist movement, which was also led by Benito Mussolini. The paper served as a way of uniting the many autonomous fascist groups across Italy in the early 1920s, and provided a way to attract new political allies and financial backers. Mussolini left the editorial staff of the paper when he moved to Rome to become prime minister in 1922, but he maintained control by appointing his younger brother Arnaldo as director of the paper, and by communicating regularly with the editors-in-chief.

Throughout the period of Fascist rule in the Kingdom of Italy, Il Popolo d'Italia officially remained an independent privately owned newspaper, separate from the National Fascist Party and the Italian state. However, it received funds from the party and the state, as well as continued support from the private sector, and consistently promoted the Fascist point of view on the issues of the day.

During his time in power, Mussolini often wrote anonymously for Il Popolo d'Italia, such as when he mocked a proposal for an Italian copy of "Heil Hitler", or to spread his ideas about Italy increasing its birth rate.

== World War II and end ==
From 1936 to 1943, the paper was edited by Giorgio Pini. Among the co-founders were Manlio Morgagni, who became an ardent supporter of fascism and the chairman of news agency Agenzia Stefani.

Following the fall of the Fascist regime in Italy, the newspaper was banned by Prime Minister Pietro Badoglio on 24 July 1943. After the German invasion of Italy and the creation of the Italian Social Republic (RSI), Mussolini explicitly refused to revive the newspaper, since he did not want it to become a mouthpiece of the German occupation forces. Instead, Mussolini generally wrote in the Corriere della Sera, when he felt that it was necessary to publish his declarations.

In 1944, Mussolini sold the headquarters of Il Popolo d'Italia to Italian businessman Gian Riccardo Cella and, after the Liberation of Italy, they were used to publish the Corriere Lombardo. In 1946 the post-war Italian government invalidated Mussolini's sale and confiscated the premises.

== Contributors ==
- Benito Mussolini
- Giuseppe Ungaretti
- Luigi Barzini, Sr.
- Luigi Razza
- Umberto Saba

== See also ==
- List of newspapers in Italy
