= List of 1960s films based on actual events =

This is a list of films and miniseries that are based on actual events. Films on this list are generally from American production unless indicated otherwise.

== 1960 ==
- The Alamo (1960) – epic historical war film about the 1836 Battle of the Alamo
- Alfonso XII and María Cristina (Spanish: Alfonso XII y María Cristina: ¿Dónde vas triste de ti?) (1960) – Spanish historical drama film about Alfonso XII who is recently widowed from Mercedes of Orléans and is urged to marry again to secure the restored monarchy and an heir to the throne. He chooses Maria Christina of Austria, who makes an excellent yet lonely queen
- Bhakta Kanakadasa (Kannada: ಭಕ್ತ ಕನಕದಾಸ) (1960) – Indian Kannada-language depicting the spiritual journey of Kanakadasa, who was a devotee of the Hindu deity Krishna, and a poet belonging to the Dasa sect
- Bluebeard's Ten Honeymoons (1960) – British thriller film loosely based on the real-life serial killer Henri Désiré Landru
- Cleopatra's Daughter (Italian: Il sepolcro dei re) (1960) – Italian historical drama film set in Egypt during the reign of the pharaoh Khufu
- Darkness Fell on Gotenhafen (German: Nacht fiel über Gotenhafen) (1960) – West German war drama film about the sinking of MV Wilhelm Gustloff, which was sunk while carrying German servicemen and around 6,000 civilian evacuees
- David and Goliath (Italian: David e Golia) (1960) – Italian Christian action drama film based on the Old Testament story from the Book of Samuel
- Esther and the King (1960) – epic drama film recounting the origin of the Jewish celebration of Purim
- Exodus (1960) – epic historical drama film about the founding of the State of Israel
- The Flesh and the Fiends (1960) – British horror film based on the true case of Burke and Hare, who murdered at least 16 people in 1828 Edinburgh, Scotland and sold their bodies for anatomical research
- The Gallant Hours (1960) – biographical war drama film about William F. Halsey Jr. and his efforts in fighting against Admiral Isoroku Yamamoto and the Imperial Japanese Navy in the Guadalcanal campaign of World War II
- The Great Mughal (Hindi: मुगल आजम) (1960) – Indian Hindi-language epic historical drama film following the love affair between Mughal Prince Salim (who went on to become Emperor Jahangir) and Anarkali, a court dancer
- Hell to Eternity (1960) – biographical war drama film about the true experiences of Marine hero Pfc. Guy Gabaldon, a Los Angeles Hispanic boy raised in the 1930s by a Japanese American foster family, and his heroic actions during the Battle of Saipan
- Her Brother (Japanese: おとうと) (1960) – Japanese drama film containing biographical elements for Kon Ichikawa, who was born in 1915 and was a young boy being raised in the 1920s, spoiled by his mother and sisters
- The Hunchback of Rome (Italian: Il gobbo) (1960) – Italian crime drama film loosely based on the real life events of Giuseppe Albano, an Italian partisan that was involved in the Roman Resistance against German occupation between 1943 and 1945
- I Aim at the Stars (1960) – biographical drama film telling the story of the life of Wernher von Braun, from his early days in Germany, through Peenemünde, until his work with the U.S. Army, NASA, and the American space program
- Inherit the Wind (1960) – biographical drama film fictionalizing the 1925 Scopes "Monkey" Trial as a means to discuss McCarthyism
- Mahakavi Kalidasu (Telugu: మహాకవి కాళిదాసు) (1960) – Indian Telugu-language biographical film based on the life of the poet Kalidasa
- Murder, Inc. (1960) – biographical gangster film based on the true story of Murder, Inc., a Brooklyn gang that operated in the 1930s
- Nader Nimai (Bengali: নাদের নিমাই) (1960) – Indian Bengali-language biographical film based on the life of Chaitanya Mahaprabhu
- The Night They Killed Rasputin (Italian: L'ultimo zar) (1960) – Italian historical adventure film about Grigori Rasputin
- Northern Story (Russian: Северная повесть) (1960) – Soviet biographical drama film taking place on the eve of the Decembrist revolt in 1825 where officer Pavel Bestuzhev, who is sent into exile in the garrison in the North, meets a wounded Decembrist, who is trying to leave Russia
- Oscar Wilde (1960) – biographical drama film primarily focusing on the litigation surrounding Wilde's libel suit against the Marquess of Queensberry, and the subsequent accusation of Wilde's homosexuality
- Pay or Die (1960) – biographical crime film about the career of New York City police officer Joseph Petrosino, a pioneer in the fight against organized crime in America
- Pretty Boy Floyd (1960) – biographical crime drama film based on the career of the notorious 1930s outlaw Charles Arthur "Pretty Boy" Floyd
- Revenge of the Barbarians (Italian: La vendetta dei barbari) (1960) – Italian historical film about the sack of Rome in AD 410 by the Visigoths
- The Rise and Fall of Legs Diamond (1960) – historical crime drama film about small-time New York City criminal, Legs Diamond, whose ambition is to become a big-time crime boss during the Prohibition era
- The Siege of Sidney Street (1960) – British historical drama film about the 1909 Tottenham Outrage - a bungled wages-snatch which resulted in the murder of a police officer and a ten-year-old bystander as well as the two armed robbers - and the 1911 Siege of Sidney Street, in which armed police surrounded a house in East End of London occupied by a gang who had killed three police officers during a bungled attempt to break into a jeweller's shop
- Sink the Bismarck! (1960) – British war drama film dealing directly with the operations, chase and sinking of the battleship Bismarck by the Royal Navy during the Second World War
- Song Without End (1960) – biographical romance film telling the story of Hungarian pianist Franz Liszt, whose scandalous love affair forced him to abandon his adoring audiences
- Spartacus (1960) – epic historical drama film about Spartacus, a slave who leads a rebellion against Rome and the events of the Third Servile War
- Storm Over the Pacific (Japanese: ハワイ・ミッドウェイ大海空戦 太平洋の嵐) (1960) – Japanese war film depicting an account of a young Japanese bombardier stationed aboard the Hiryu and his participation in two battles in the Pacific during World War II, the attack on Pearl Harbor and the Battle of Midway
- The Story of Ruth (1960) – Christian historical romance film based on the biblical Book of Ruth
- Sunrise at Campobello (1960) – biographical drama film telling the story of the struggles of future President of the United States Franklin Delano Roosevelt and his family when Roosevelt was stricken with paralysis at the age of 39 in August 1921
- Sweetheart of the Gods (German: Liebling der Götter) (1960) – West German biographical drama film portraying the life of Renate Müller, a German film actress who died in 1937 in mysterious circumstances
- Testament of Orpheus (French: Le testament d'Orphée) (1960) – French biographical fantasy film about Jean Cocteau who looks back over his life and work, recalling his inspirations and obsessions
- The Trials of Oscar Wilde (1960) – British historical drama film based on the libel and subsequent criminal cases involving Oscar Wilde and the Marquess of Queensberry
- Two Women (Italian: La ciociara) (1960) – Italian war drama film based on actual events of 1944 in Rome and rural Lazio, during the Marocchinate
- Under Ten Flags (Italian: Sotto dieci bandiere) (1960) – Italian war film loosely based on actual events during World War II, depicting real-life German Captain Bernhard Rogge commanding the navy raider Atlantis, which from May 1940 to November 1941 sank 22 Allied merchant ships

== 1961 ==
- A Story of David (Hebrew: סיפור דוד) (1961) – British-Israeli drama film depicting the life of the Biblical King David and his conflicted relationship with King Saul
- Barabbas (1961) – epic religious film expanding on the career of Barabbas, from the Christian Passion narrative in the Gospel of Mark and other gospels
- Bridge to the Sun (1961) – war drama film based on the 1957 autobiography Bridge to the Sun by Gwen Terasaki, which detailed events in Terasaki's life and marriage
- Constantine and the Cross (Italian: Costantino il grande) (1961) – Italian historical drama film about the early career of the emperor Constantine, who first legalized and then adopted Christianity in the early 4th century as far into his life as the Battle of the Milvian Bridge in AD 312
- Darclee (1961) – Romanian drama film based on the life of Hariclea Darclée
- Duel of the Titans (Italian: Romolo e Remo) (1961) – Italian action drama film about Romulus and Remus' revolt against tyranny in pre-Roman Italy and how they lead their people toward the founding of a new city, known as Rome
- El Cid (1961) – epic historical drama film based on the life of the 11th-century Castilian warlord Rodrigo Díaz de Vivar, called "El Cid" (from the Arabic al-sidi, meaning "The Lord")
- Francis of Assisi (1961) – biographical drama film about the life of Francis of Assisi
- The George Raft Story (1961) – biographical drama film depicting George Raft's turbulent life and career
- The Gleiwitz Case (German: Der Fall Gleiwitz) (1961) – East German war film depicting the Gleiwitz incident from 31 August 1939, a false flag attack on a German radio station staged by the SS
- The Great Impostor (1961) – comedy drama film based on the story of an impostor named Ferdinand Waldo Demara
- Greyfriars Bobby (1961) – family drama film based upon an incident in 19th century Edinburgh involving a dog that came to be known as Greyfriars Bobby
- The Hoodlum Priest (1961) – drama film based on the life of Father Charles "Dismas" Clark of St. Louis, who ministered to men in prison and men coming out of prison
- Judgment at Nuremberg (1961) – epic courtroom drama film depicting a fictionalized version of the Judges' Trial of 1947, one of the twelve Nuremberg Military Tribunals conducted under the auspices of the U.S. military in the aftermath of the Second World War
- King of Kings (1961) – epic religious film telling the story of Jesus of Nazareth from his birth and ministry to his crucifixion and resurrection
- King of the Roaring '20s: The Story of Arnold Rothstein (1961) – biographical crime drama film telling the story of flamboyant Prohibition-era gangster, gambler and bootlegger Arnold Rothstein
- Mad Dog Coll (1961) – biographical crime drama film about the life of Vincent "Mad Dog" Coll Curran, who was born in 1908 in County Donegal
- The Moises Padilla Story (Filipino: Ang Kwento ni Moises Padilla) (1961) – Philippine biographical action film about a Negros Occidental mayoral candidate who in 1951, was tortured and murdered by the private army of the provincial governor after he had refused to withdraw his candidacy
- The Navigator (Tamil: கப்பலோட்டிய தமிழன்) (1961) – Indian Tamil-language historical drama film about V. O. Chidambaram Pillai who founded the Swadeshi Stream Navigation Company to break the monopoly of the British over maritime trade out of India
- The Outsider (1961) – biographical war film about Ira Hayes, a Native American who fought in World War II in the United States Marine Corps and was one of the Marines who raised the flag on Iwo Jima
- Portrait of a Mobster (1961) – crime drama film portraying the rise and fall of 1920s gangster Dutch Schultz
- Prince Yeonsan (Korean: 연산군) (1961) – South Korean drama film about Yeonsangun of Joseon as a prince trying to restore the status of his mother, the deposed and executed Queen Yun
- The Story of Joseph and His Brethren (Italian: Giuseppe venduto dai fratelli) (1961) – Italian biographical drama film telling the story of Joseph and his brothers
- Sword of the Conqueror (Italian: Rosmunda e Alboino) (1961) – Italian historical adventure film centering on the conflict between Alboin, King of the Lombards, and Cunimund, King of the Gepids, following the Lombards' invasion of Italy
- Two Half Times in Hell (Hungarian: Két félidő a pokolban) (1961) – Hungarian war film based on a 1942 football match between German soldiers and their Soviet Ukrainian prisoners of war during World War II, known as the Death Match, although in the film the prisoners of war are Hungarian labour servicemen
- Victoria Regina (1961) – historical drama television film depicting the life of Great Britain's Queen Victoria through vignettes starting with her accession to the throne at age 18, covering her romance with Prince Albert, and ending with her time as an elderly widow at age 78

== 1962 ==
- A Queen for Caesar (Italian: Una regina per Cesare, French: Cléopâtre une reine pour César) (1962) – Italian-French historical drama film focusing entirely on the dynastic struggle within Egypt leading up to the arrival of Caesar
- Axel Munthe, The Doctor of San Michele (1962) – biographical drama film based on the memoirs of the Swedish doctor Axel Munthe
- Birdman of Alcatraz (1962) – biographical drama film about the life of Robert Stroud, who was sentenced to solitary confinement after having killed a prison guard. A federal prison inmate, he became known as the "Birdman of Alcatraz" because of his studies of birds, which had taken place when he was incarcerated at Leavenworth Prison where he was allowed to keep birds in jail
- Caesar the Conqueror (Italian: Giulio Cesare, il conquistatore delle Gallie) (1962) – Italian adventure drama film centering around Julius Caesar's battling the rebels in Gaul
- The Collegno Amnesiac (Italian: Lo smemorato di Collegno) (1962) – Italian commedia all'italiana drama film based on the Bruneri-Canella case
- Convicts 4 (1962) – neo-noir crime film depicting the story of the life of death row convict John Resko
- The Counterfeit Traitor (1962) – spy thriller film about an American-born Swedish citizen who is forced to spy on the Nazis in World War II
- Dada Thakur (Bengali: দাদা ঠাকুর) (1962) – Indian Bengali-language based on the life of publisher, editor and satirist Sarat Chandra Pandit (popularly known as Dada Thakur)
- Elgar (1962) – British biographical drama film about the life of the English composer Sir Edward Elgar
- The Elusive Corporal (French: Le Caporal épinglé) (1962) – French war film based on Jacques Perret's book based on his own prisoner of war experiences
- Escape from East Berlin (1962) – American-German historical drama film taking place in East Berlin soon after the Berlin Wall is built, and is based on an actual escape on January 24, 1962
- Everyone Dies Alone (German: Jeder stirbt für sich allein) (1962) – West German political drama television film based on the true story of a working class couple, Otto and Elise Hampel, who committed acts of civil disobedience against the government of Nazi Germany and were executed
- Freud: The Secret Passion (1962) – biographical drama film based on the life of Austrian neurologist Sigmund Freud
- Geronimo (1962) – action drama Western film following the events leading up to the final surrender of Geronimo during the Apache-United States Wars in 1886
- Gypsy (1962) – musical biographical drama film about the life and times of burlesque dancer Gypsy Rose Lee and her aggressive stage mother, Mama Rose
- Hitler (1962) – biographical war drama film depicting Hitler through the years, beginning with the Beer Hall Putsch of November 1923 and focuses mainly on his private life, in particular, his relationships with niece Geli and longtime companion/wife, Eva Braun
- How the West Was Won (1962) – Western epic anthology film covering several decades of Westward expansion in the 19th century, including the Gold Rush, the Civil War, and the building of the railroads
- It Happened in Athens (1962) – sport comedy-drama film depicting the story of water-carrier Spyridon Louis
- King of Music - Tansen (Hindi: संगीत सम्राट तानसेन) (1962) – Indian Hindi-language historical drama film about the famous court singer musician, Mian Tansen, one of the Navaratnas in Emperor Akbar's court
- Kozara (1962) – Yugoslav war drama film depicting events surrounding the Battle of Kozara
- Lawrence of Arabia (1962) – epic biographical adventure drama film depicting Lawrence's experiences in the Ottoman provinces of Hejaz and Greater Syria during the First World War, in particular his attacks on Aqaba and Damascus and his involvement in the Arab National Council
- The Longest Day (1962) – epic war film about the D-Day landings at Normandy on June 6, 1944
- The Magnificent Concubine (Mandarin: 楊貴妃) (1962) – Hong Kong historical drama film telling the story of Yang Guifei, Yang Guozhong and the Fanyang Chief revolt, imperiling the throne
- Merrill's Marauders (1962) – adventure crime drama film based on the exploits of the long-range penetration jungle warfare unit of the same name in the Burma campaign, culminating in the Siege of Myitkyina
- The Miracle Worker (1962) – biographical drama film about Anne Sullivan, blind tutor to Helen Keller
- Mutiny on the Bounty (1962) – historical drama film based on the story of the real-life mutiny led by Fletcher Christian against William Bligh, captain of HMAV Bounty, in 1789
- No Man Is an Island (1962) – war drama film about the exploits of George Ray Tweed, a United States Navy radioman who avoided capture and execution by the Japanese during their years-long World War II occupation of Guam
- The Password Is Courage (1962) – British comedy-drama war film based on the true story of Sergeant-Major Charles Coward
- Pattinathar (Tamil: பட்டினத்தார்) (1962) – Indian Tamil-language biographical film about Pattinathar who became the guru and contemporary of another ascetic philosopher, Pattirakiriyar
- Queen Samyuktha (Tamil: ராணி சம்யுக்தா) (1962) – Indian Tamil-language historical romance film about the relationship between Prithvirajan and Samyuktha
- The Reluctant Saint (1962) – American-Italian historical comedy-drama film telling the story of Joseph of Cupertino, a 17th-century Italian Conventual Franciscan friar and mystic honored as a saint by the Catholic Church
- Salvatore Giuliano (1962) – Italian historical crime drama film following the lives of those involved with the famous Sicilian bandit Salvatore Giuliano
- Seven Seas to Calais (Italian: Il dominatore dei sette mari) (1962) – Italian adventure film depicting the career of Sir Francis Drake
- The Silent Raid (Dutch: De Overval) (1962) – war thriller film depicting the raid on Leeuwarden prison of December 8, 1944 in World War II
- Sodom and Gomorrah (1962) – Christian epic film based on the Biblical reading of Sodom and Gomorrah In August 1960 Titanus announced it would make the film with Joseph E. Levine and it would star Stewart Granger.
- Ten Italians for One German (Italian: Dieci italiani per un tedesco (Via Rasella)) (1962) – Italian historical war drama film about the Fosse Ardeatine massacre
- The Trial of Joan of Arc (French: Procès de Jeanne d'Arc) (1962) – French historical drama film about the Trial of Joan of Arc
- Tyrant Yeonsan (Korean: 폭군 연산) (1962) – South Korean biographical drama film chronicling the tyrannical reign of King Yeonsangun of Joseon
- The Valiant (1962) – British war drama action film based on the Italian manned torpedo attack which seriously damaged the two British battleships Valiant and Queen Elizabeth and the oil tanker Sagona at the port of Alexandria in December 1941
- The Wonderful World of the Brothers Grimm (1962) – biographical fantasy film telling the story of Wilhelm and Jacob Grimm, and three of their stories

== 1963 ==
- Act One (1963) – biographical drama film about the life of Moss Hart
- America America (1963) – adventure drama film inspired by the life of Elia Kazan's uncle
- The Castilian (Spanish: El valle de las espadas) (1963) – Spanish historical action film concerning Fernán González, the first independent count of Castile, who lived and ruled in the early 10th century
- The Christine Keeler Story (1963) – biographical drama film about the Profumo affair
- Cleopatra (1963) – epic historical drama film chronicling the struggles of Cleopatra, the young queen of Egypt, to resist the imperial ambitions of Rome
- Dr. Crippen (1963) – British biographical crime film concerning the real-life Edwardian doctor Hawley Harvey Crippen, who was hanged in 1910 for the murder of his wife
- Empress Wu Tse-Tien (Mandarin: 武則天) (1963) – Hong Kong historical drama film about the life of Empress Wu Zetian
- The Great Escape (1963) – epic war thriller film depicting a heavily fictionalized version of the mass escape by British Commonwealth prisoners of war from German POW camp Stalag Luft III during the Second World War
- The Great Journey (Czech: Velká cesta) (1963) – Czechoslovak-Soviet biographical drama film about Jaroslav Hašek
- Johnny Shiloh (1963) – family adventure television film based on the true story about Johnny Clem, the ten year old drummer boy who became a union officer in the Civil War
- Ladybug Ladybug (1963) – drama film about an actual incident at a California elementary school during the 1962 Cuban Missile Crisis
- Landru (1963) – French-Italian biographical crime drama film based on the story of French serial killer Henri Désiré Landru, who murdered and dismembered more than 10 women during World War I
- Miracle of the White Stallions (1963) – adventure war film based on the story of Operation Cowboy which was the evacuation of the Lipizzaner horses from the Spanish Riding School in Vienna during World War II
- Naked Among Wolves (German: Nackt unter Wölfen) (1963) – East German war drama film telling the story of inmates of Buchenwald concentration camp who hid a Polish child from SS guards
- PT 109 (1963) – biographical war drama film depicting the actions of John F. Kennedy as an officer of the United States Navy in command of Motor Torpedo Boat PT-109 in the Pacific theater of World War II
- Road to the Stage (Armenian: Ճանապարհ դեպի բեմ) (1963) – Soviet era Armenian war drama film about a young circus artist (Leonid Yengibarov) who becomes a famous star
- The Sadist (1963) – horror exploitation film inspired by the real life murder spree of teenage killer Charles Starkweather
- Saladin the Victorious (Arabic: الناصر صلاح الدين) (1963) – Egyptian epic film telling the story of Saladin, ruler of the kingdoms surrounding Jerusalem, during the events of the Third Crusade
- The Terrorist (Italian: Il terrorista) (1963) – Italian war drama film inspired by real life events of the Italian partisan Otello Pighin
- These Are The Paths Of Love (Hindi: ये रास्ते हैं प्यार के) (1963) – romantic crime drama film based on the sensational K.M. Nanavati adultery and murder case in Mumbai
- Torpedo Bay (1963) – war drama film based on events that took place at Betasom, a submarine base established at Bordeaux by the Italian Navy during World War II
- The Verona Trial (Italian: Il processo di Verona) (1963) – Italian historical drama film telling of the final phases of the Italian fascist regime, in particular the affair of the 1944 Verona trial, in which Galeazzo Ciano, Emilio De Bono, Giovanni Marinelli and other eminent Fascist officials (Carlo Pareschi and Luciano Gottardi) were sentenced to death and almost immediately executed by a shooting detachment, while Tullio Cianetti was sentenced to 30 years imprisonment
- The V.I.P.s (also known as Hotel International) (1963) – A British comedy-drama film in Metrocolor and Panavision, following a group of travelers bound for a flight to New York City, they wait at the lounge of the London's Heathrow airport, each passenger at a moment of crisis in his or her life. Inspired by a real-life incident involving actress Vivien Leigh wanting to leave her husband, Laurence Olivier, for actor Peter Finch.
- The Victors (1963) – British-American war film following a group of U.S. soldiers through Europe during the Second World War, from Britain in 1942, through the fierce fighting in Italy and the invasion of Normandy, to the uneasy peace of occupied Berlin - adapted from a collection of short stories called The Human Kind by English author Alexander Baron, based upon his own wartime experiences
- The Windows of Heaven (1963) – Christian drama film about Lorenzo Snow, the fifth president of the Church of Jesus Christ of Latter-day Saints

== 1964 ==
- Amarashilpi Jakanachari (Kannada: ಅಮರಶಿಲ್ಪಿ ಜಕಣಾಚಾರಿ) (1964) – Indian Kannada-language historical drama film about Amarashilpi Jakanachari, a sculptor from the 12th-century Hoysala Empire
- Amarasilpi Jakkanna (Telugu: అమరశిల్పి జక్కన్న) (1964) – Indian Telugu-language historical drama film depicting Jakanachari, a legendary sculptor from the Hoysala period
- Arunagirinathar (Tamil: அருணகிரிநாதர்) (1964) – Indian Tamil-language biographical drama film about the poet of the same name
- Becket (1964) – British historical drama film about the historic, tumultuous relationship between Henry II of England and his friend-turned-bishop Thomas Becket
- Black Like Me (1964) – drama film about white reporter John Howard Griffin who disguised himself to pass as an African-American man for six weeks in 1959 in the Deep South to experience the realities of a black man's life in the segregated South
- The Crime of Aldeia Velha (Portuguese: O Crime da Aldeia Velha) (1964) – Portuguese drama film inspired by a real murder that took place in a small village of northern Portugal during the 1930s
- Culloden (1964) – British biographical drama television film depicting the 1746 Battle of Culloden, the final engagement of the Jacobite rising of 1745 which saw the Jacobite Army be decisively defeated by government troops and in the words of the narrator "tore apart forever the clan system of the Scottish Highlands"
- The Enchanted Desna (Ukrainian: Зачарована Десна) (1964) – Soviet era Ukrainian fantasy film based on based on an autobiographical story by a Ukrainian national writer and cinematographer Oleksandr Dovzhenko, depicting his whimsical childhood experiences in a Ukrainian village near the banks of river Desna
- The Fall of the Roman Empire (1964) – epic historical drama film focusing the onset of corruption and decadence which led to Rome's demise
- The Gospel According to St. Matthew (Italian: Il vangelo secondo Matteo) (1964) – Italian Christian drama film depicting a cinematic rendition of the story of Jesus according to the Gospel of Matthew, from the Nativity through the Resurrection
- Island of the Blue Dolphins (1964) – adventure biographical drama film based on the life of a Native American woman who lived 18 years in relative isolation on San Nicolas Island
- Lady General Hua Mu-lan (Cantonese: 花木蘭) (1964) – Hong Kong Huangmei opera musical film depicting the story of Hua Mulan
- Luther (1964) – biographical drama television film about the life of Luther during the years of 1506–1530
- Revolt of the Praetorians (Italian: La Rivolta dei Pretoriani) (1964) – Italian historical sword-and-sandal film about the conspiracy to assassinate the emperor Domitian in the year AD 96
- The Train (1964) – French-American war film loosely based on the non-fiction book Le front de l'art by Rose Valland, who documented the works of art placed in storage that had been looted by Nazi Germany from museums and private art collections
- The Unsinkable Molly Brown (1964) – comedy musical Western film depiciting a fictionalized account of the life of Margaret Brown, who survived the 1912 sinking of the RMS Titanic
- Your Cheatin' Heart (1964) – biographical musical drama film about country singer Hank Williams
- Zulu (1964) – British epic war film depicting the Battle of Rorke's Drift between the British Army and the Zulus in January 1879, during the Anglo-Zulu War

== 1965 ==
- A Man Named John (Italian: E venne un uomo) (1965) – Italian drama film about Pope John XXIII
- The Agony and the Ecstasy (1965) – historical drama film dealing with the conflicts of Michelangelo and Pope Julius II during the 1508-1512 painting of the Sistine Chapel ceiling
- As Long As There's Life in Me (German: Solange Leben in mir ist) (1965) – East German biographical war drama film following the life of the German communist leader Karl Liebknecht during the first half of World War I
- The Assassination (Czech: Atentát) (1965) – Czechoslovak war film depicting World War II events before and after the assassination of top German leader Reinhard Heydrich in Prague (Operation Anthropoid)
- Battle of the Bulge (1965) – epic war drama film depicting a dramatization of Nazi Germany's final Western Front counterattack of World War II
- The Debussy Film (1965) – British biographical television film about French composer Claude Debussy
- Genghis Khan (1965) – biographical adventure film depicting a fictionalized account of the life and conquests of the Mongol emperor Genghis Khan
- The Great Race (1965) – epic slapstick comedy film inspired by the actual 1908 New York to Paris Race
- The Great Sioux Massacre (1965) – Western war film depicting Colonel Custer's descent from a defender of the Indians from Federal interference to an incompetent warmonger, and the Indians as his victims, and covers events leading up to the Battle of the Little Bighorn and Custer's Last Stand
- The Greatest Story Ever Told (1965) – Christian epic film depicting a retelling of the Biblical account about Jesus of Nazareth, from the Nativity through to the Ascension
- Harlow (1965) – biographical drama film based on the life of screen star Jean Harlow
- Harlow (1965) – biographical drama film about the life of film star Jean Harlow
- The Heroes of Telemark (1965) – British war film based on the true story of the Norwegian heavy water sabotage during the Second World War from Skis Against the Atom, the memoirs of Norwegian resistance soldier Knut Haukelid
- King Rat (1965) – war film adapted from James Clavell's novel King Rat, which in turn is partly based on Clavell's experiences as a POW at Changi Prison in Singapore in the latter part of the Second World War
- Lee Seong-gye King Taejo (Korean: 태조 이성계) (1965) – South Korean biographical drama film based on the life and reign of King Taejo
- The Magnificent Yankee (1965) – biographical television film examining the life of United States Supreme Court Justice Oliver Wendell Holmes
- Man of Destiny (Tagalog: Iginuhit ng Tadhana) (1965) – Filipino biographical propaganda film telling of the life and exploits of then-Philippine Presidential candidate Senator Ferdinand E. Marcos
- Marco the Magnificent (1965) – international co-production about the life of Marco Polo
- Murieta (1965) – biographical Western film about Joaquin Murrieta
- Nights of Farewell (Russian: Третья молодость) (1965) – Soviet-French drama film about the young dancer Marius Petipa, who is invited to St. Petersburg, which will completely change his life
- Operation Crossbow (1965) – British spy drama film concerning an actual series of events where British undercover operatives targeted the German manufacturing facilities for experimental rocket-bombs
- Shaheed (Hindi: शहीद) (1965) – Indian Hindi-language biographical drama film based on the life of Bhagat Singh
- Shakespeare Wallah (1965) – romantic drama film about a travelling family theatre troupe of English actors in India, who perform Shakespeare plays in towns across India, amidst a dwindling demand for their work and the rise of Bollywood
- The Sound of Music (1965) – musical biographical drama film about a young Austrian postulant (Maria von Trapp) who, in 1938, is sent to the villa of a retired naval officer and widower (Captain von Trapp) to be governess to his seven children
- The Vampire of Düsseldorf (French: Le Vampire de Düsseldorf) – French crime thriller film based on the life and crimes of German serial killer Peter Kürten
- Young Cassidy (1965) – British biographical drama film based upon the life of the playwright Seán O'Casey

== 1966 ==
- A Man for All Seasons (1966) – British historical drama film depicting the final years of Sir Thomas More, the 16th-century Lord Chancellor of England who refused both to sign a letter asking Pope Clement VII to annul Henry VIII of England's marriage to Catherine of Aragon and to take an Oath of Supremacy declaring Henry Supreme Head of the Church of England
- Alvarez Kelly (1966) – Western drama film based on the historic Beefsteak Raid of September 1864 led by Confederate Major General Wade Hampton III
- Andrei Rublev (Russian: Андрей Рублёв) (1966) – Soviet biographical historical drama film based on the life of Andrei Rublev, a 15th-century Russian icon painter
- The Battle of Algiers (Italian: La battaglia di Algeri; Arabic: معركة الجزائر) (1966) – Italian-Algerian war drama film based on events undertaken by rebels during the Algerian War (1954–1962) against the French government in North Africa, the most prominent being the eponymous Battle of Algiers, the capital of Algeria
- Black Girl (French: La noire de...) (1966) – French-Senegalese drama film based on a short story from Sembène's 1962 collection Voltaique, which was in turn inspired by a real life incident
- Born Free (1966) – British adventure drama film about Joy and George Adamson who raised Elsa the Lioness, an orphaned lion cub, to adulthood and released her into the wilderness of Kenya
- Cast a Giant Shadow (1966) – historical drama film based on the life of Colonel Mickey Marcus
- Day Stars (Russian: Дневные звёзды) (1966) – Soviet drama film telling about Olga Bergholz, the Soviet poet who achieved the greatest success during the siege of Leningrad
- El Greco (1966) – Italian biographical drama film about the painter El Greco
- The Fighting Prince of Donegal (1966) – biographical adventure film following the real-life exploits of the 16th-century Irish prince Hugh Roe "Red Hugh" O'Donnell
- Is Paris Burning? (French: Paris brûle-t-il ?) (1966) – French epic war film about the liberation of Paris in August 1944 by the French Resistance and the Free French Forces during World War II
- Isadora Duncan, the Biggest Dancer in the World (1966) – biographical television film based on the life of the American dancer Isadora Duncan
- Khartoum (1966) – British epic war film based on historical accounts of Gordon's defence of the Sudanese city of Khartoum from the forces of the Mahdist army, during the 1884–1885 Siege of Khartoum
- Mahakavi Kalidas (Tamil: மகாகவி காளிதாஸ்) (1966) – Indian Tamil-language biographical drama film based on the life of the poet Kalidasa
- Rasputin the Mad Monk (1966) – biographical horror drama film about Grigori Rasputin, the Russian peasant-mystic who gained great influence with the Tsars prior to the Russian Revolution
- Since (1966) – historical drama film about the assassination of the President of the United States, John F. Kennedy
- The Singing Nun (1966) – biographical musical drama film about the life of Jeannine Deckers, the nun who recorded the chart-topping song "Dominique"
- The Taking of Power by Louis XIV (French: La prise de pouvoir par Louis XIV) (1966) – French historical television film revolving around the French king Louis XIV's rise to power after the death of his powerful advisor, Cardinal Mazarin
- Wake Up and Die (Italian: Svegliati e uccidi) (1966) – Italian crime drama film based on the real life of Luciano Lutring, an Italian criminal known as "the machine-gun soloist"
- Woman of Darkness (Swedish: Yngsjömordet) (1966) – Swedish historical crime film based on the real Yngsjö murder case of 1889
- Year as Long as Life (Russian: Год как жизнь) (1966) – Soviet drama film about the popular uprisings that took place in Europe in the 19th century, as well as the search for truth and the confrontation of Karl Marx and opponents of the revolution

== 1967 ==
- Attack on the Iron Coast (1967) – British-American war film based on the commando raid on the French port of St. Nazaire in the Second World War
- The Banner of Krivoi Rog (German: Die Fahne von Kriwoj Rog) (1967) – East German war film depicting th liberation of Ukrainian city of Krivoy Rog in the Second World War
- Beach Red (1967) – biographical war film based on Peter Bowman's 1945 novella of the same name, which was based on his experiences with the United States Army Corps of Engineers in the Pacific War
- Bonnie and Clyde (1967) – biographical neo-noir crime film about Clyde Barrow and Bonnie Parker
- Cervantes (1967) – French-Italian-Spanish adventure drama film depicting the early life of Miguel de Cervantes
- Custer of the West (1967) – Western film presenting a highly fictionalised version of the life and death of George Armstrong Custer
- Dacii (1967) – historical drama film about the run up to Domitian's Dacian War, which was fought between the Roman Empire and the Dacians in AD 87-88
- The Diary of Anne Frank (1967) – drama television film based on the posthumously published 1947 book The Diary of a Young Girl by Anne Frank
- Elvira Madigan (1967) – Swedish romantic drama film based on the tragedy of the Danish slackrope dancer Hedvig Jensen, working under the stage name of Elvira Madigan at her stepfather's traveling circus, and her romance with Swedish nobleman lieutenant Sixten Sparre
- First to Fight (1967) – biographical war film based loosely on the story of United States Marine Gunnery Sergeant John "Manila" Basilone, who later went back into action and died at Iwo Jima
- Frozen Flashes (German: Die gefrorenen Blitze) (1967) – East German historical film revolving around the history of the resistance movement in Peenemünde during the Second World War and its attempt to sabotage the V-2 program
- The Greatest Gamble (Norwegian: Det største spillet) (1967) – Norwegian war drama film telling the story about Norwegian resistance member Gunvald Tomstad, and his experience as a double agent during World War II
- The Green Carriage (Russian: Зелёная карета) (1967) – Soviet biographical drama film portraying the life of the nineteenth century stage actress Varvara Asenkova
- The Happiest Millionaire (1967) – musical comedy film based upon the true story of Philadelphia millionaire Anthony Drexel Biddle
- Hour of the Gun (1967) – Western drama film depicting Wyatt Earp and Doc Holliday during their 1881 battles against Ike Clanton and his brothers in the Gunfight at the O.K. Corral, and the gunfight's aftermath in and around Tombstone, Arizona
- I Killed Rasputin (French: J'ai tué Raspoutine) (1967) – French-Italian biographical drama film based on the murder of Rasputin
- In Cold Blood (1967) – neo-noir crime film detailing the 1959 murders of four members of the Clutter family in the small farming community of Holcomb, Kansas
- Japan's Longest Day (Japanese: 日本のいちばん長い日) (1967) – Japanese epic war film set on August 15, 1945, when Emperor Hirohito's decision to surrender to the Allies in World War II was broadcast to the Japanese people, and the attempted coup d'état to prevent that from happening
- The Life of Na Woon-gyu (Korean: 나운규 일생) (1967) – South Korean drama film about life and death of Na Woon-gyu who was film actor and director who struggled for rise of Korean cinema during Japanese rule of Korea
- Massacre in the Black Forest (Italian: Il Massacro Della Foresta Nera; German: Hermann der Cherusker – Die Schlacht im Teutoburger Wald) (1967) – Italian-Yugoslav-West German historical drama film centering on Arminius, a chieftain of the Cherusci Germanic tribe (in what is now Lower Saxony), who drew three Roman legions into an ambush in the Teutoburg Forest, known as the Battle of the Teutoburg Forest
- Nawab Sirajuddaula (Bengali: নবাব সিরাজউদ্দৌলা) (1967) – Pakistani Bengali-language biographical film detailing the life of Nawab of Bengal Siraj ud-Daulah and the Battle of Plassey
- Robbery (1967) – British crime mystery film depicting a fictionalized version of the 1963 Great Train Robbery
- Saint Joan (1967) – biographical drama television film about 15th-century French military figure Joan of Arc
- Sofiya Perovskaya (Russian: Софья Перовская) (1967) – Soviet biographical film based on the life of Sofiya Perovskaya, member of Narodnaya Volya, executed for taking part in planning the successful assassination of Alexander II of Russia
- The St. Valentine's Day Massacre (1967) – historical gangster film based on the 1929 mass murder of seven members of the Northside Gang (led by George "Bugs" Moran) on orders from Al Capone
- Tobruk (1967) – war drama film loosely based on the British attacks on Italian and German forces at Tobruk codenamed "Operation Agreement"
- Westerplatte (Polish: Westerplatte broni się nadal) (1967) – Polish historical war film based upon the Battle of Westerplatte in September 1939

== 1968 ==
- Anzio (Italian: Lo sbarco di Anzio) (1968) – American-Italian war drama film about Operation Shingle, the 1944 Allied seaborne assault on the Italian port of Anzio in World War II
- Black Jesus (Italian: Seduto alla sua destra) (1968) – Italian drama film inspired by the final days of the first Prime Minister of the Democratic Republic of the Congo, Patrice Lumumba
- The Boston Strangler (1968) – biographical crime drama film based on the true story of the Boston Strangler
- The Caesars (1968) – British historical drama miniseries dealing with the lives of the early emperors of Ancient Rome
- The Charge of the Light Brigade (1968) – British epic war drama film depicting parts of the Crimean War and the eponymous charge
- The Chronicle of Anna Magdalena Bach (German: Chronik der Anna Magdalena Bach) (1968) – West German historical drama film depicting the life and music of Johann Sebastian Bach as presented by his wife, Anna
- The Countess Cosel (Polish: Hrabina Cosel) (1968) – Polish historical romance film based on the true story of the beautiful Anna Constantia von Brockdorff, a German noblewoman who became mistress of Augustus the Strong, King of Poland and Elector of Saxony in 1704
- The Devil's Brigade (1968) – war drama film recounting the formation, training, and first mission of the 1st Special Service Force, a joint American-Canadian commando unit, known as the Devil's Brigade
- Elizabeth the Queen (1968) – biographical drama television film about the life and reign of Elizabeth I
- Emma Hamilton (1968) – historical drama film depicting the love affair between Emma Hamilton and Horatio Nelson
- Femme Fatale, Jang Hee-bin (Korean: 요화 장희빈) (1968) – South Korean drama film about Jang Ok-jeong who was publicly executed about conspiring to drive the old queen into exile
- Funny Girl (1968) – biographical musical film based on the life and career of Broadway and film star and comedienne Fanny Brice and her stormy relationship with entrepreneur and gambler Nicky Arnstein
- I Was Nineteen (German: Ich war neunzehn) (1968) – East German biographical war drama film telling the story of a young German, Gregor Hecker, who fled the Nazis with his parents to Moscow and in early 1945 returned to Germany as a lieutenant in the Red Army
- Isadora (1968) – biographical drama film following the life of American pioneering modern contemporary dance artist and choreographer Isadora Duncan, who performed to great acclaim throughout the US and Europe during the 19th century
- The Lion in Winter (1968) – historical drama film set at Christmas 1183; it centres on political and personal turmoil among the royal family of Henry II of England, his wife Eleanor of Aquitaine, their three surviving sons, and the French king
- Manila, Open City (1968) – Filipino war film about the Battle of Manila in World War II
- Mayerling (1968) – romantic drama film dealing with the real-life Mayerling Incident
- The Other Side of Bonnie and Clyde (1968) – crime drama film about Bonnie and Clyde
- Prince Daewon (Korean: 대원군) (1968) – South Korean historical drama film depicting power struggles in the last days of the Joseon Dynasty
- The Seven Cervi Brothers (Italian: I sette fratelli Cervi) (1968) – Italian drama film recounting the last days of life during the resistance of the anti-fascist Cervi Brothers
- Song of Summer (1968) – biographical drama film portraying the final six years of Frederick Delius' life, during which Eric Fenby lived with the composer and his wife Jelka as Delius's amanuensis
- Star! (1968) – biographical musical film based on the life and career of British performer Gertrude Lawrence
- Submarine X-1 (1968) – British war film loosely based on the Operation Source attack on the German battleship Tirpitz in 1943

== 1969 ==
- Adalen Riots (Swedish: Ådalen 31) (1969) – Swedish historical drama film depicting the 1931 Ådalen shootings, in which Swedish military forces opened fire against labour demonstrators in the Swedish sawmill district of Ådalen killing five people, including a young girl
- Age of Consent (1969) – British-Australian romantic comedy drama film based loosely on Norman Lindsay, who travels to a rural township of New South Wales in search of scenic inspiration, but who meets instead a wild adolescent girl who serves as his model and muse
- Alfred the Great (1969) – British epic film portraying Alfred the Great's struggle to defend the Anglo-Saxon Kingdom of Wessex from a Danish Viking invasion in the 9th century
- Anne of the Thousand Days (1969) – British historical drama film based on the life of Anne Boleyn
- Battle of Britain (1969) – British historical war film documenting the events of the Battle of Britain, when in the summer and autumn of 1940 the British RAF inflicted a strategic defeat on the Luftwaffe and so ensured the cancellation of Operation Sea Lion, Adolf Hitler's plan to invade Britain
- The Battle of El Alamein (1969) – Italian-French war film depicting the Second Battle of El Alamein
- Battle of Neretva (Croatian: Bitka na Neretvi; Serbian: Битка на Неретви) (1969) – Yugoslavian epic partisan film based on the Battle of the Neretva, a combined Axis strategic offensive launched against the Yugoslav Partisans throughout occupied Yugoslavia during World War II
- Boy (Japanese: 少年) (1969) – Japanese drama film following the title character, Toshio Omura, across Japan, as he is forced to participate in a dangerous scam to support his dysfunctional family, based on real events reported in Japanese newspapers in 1966
- The Bridge at Remagen (1969) – action war film depicting a highly fictionalized version of actual events during the last months of World War II, when the U.S. 9th Armored Division approached Remagen and captured the intact Ludendorff Bridge
- Butch Cassidy and the Sundance Kid (1969) – Western buddy film based on the story of Wild West outlaws Robert LeRoy Parker, known as Butch Cassidy, and his partner Harry Longabaugh, the "Sundance Kid", who are on the run from a crack US posse after a string of train robberies
- Casanova: His Youthful Years (Italian: Infanzia, vocazione e prime esperienze di Giacomo Casanova, veneziano) (1969) – Italian comedy film about the youth of Giacomo Casanova, who, after an unhappy childhood and early ecclesiastical activity in Venice, became an abbot and abandoned his vocation for the love of a countess
- Che! (1969) – biographical drama film following Marxist revolutionary Ernesto "Che" Guevara from when he first landed in Cuba in 1956 to his death in Bolivia in 1967
- The Color of Pomegranates (Armenian: Նռան գույնը) (1969) – Soviet era Armenian art film depicting a poetic treatment of the life of 18th-century Armenian poet and troubadour Sayat-Nova
- The Conspiracy of Torture (Italian: Beatrice Cenci) (1969) – Italian historical drama film depicting the real life events of Francesco Cenci and his daughter Beatrice, emphasizing the more horrific elements of the story
- De Sade (German: Das Ausschweifende Leben des Marquis De Sade) (1969) – American-West German drama film based on the life of Donatien Alphonse François, Marquis de Sade
- Eros + Massacre (Japanese: エロス+虐殺) (1969) – Japanese experimental drama film about anarchist Sakae Ōsugi, who was murdered by the Japanese military police in 1923
- The First Churchills (1969) – British historical drama miniseries about the life of John Churchill, 1st Duke of Marlborough, and his wife, Sarah Churchill, Duchess of Marlborough
- Hell Raiders (1969) – war television film reportedly based on the capture of General William Dean during the Korean War
- Jackal of Nahueltoro (Spanish: El Chacal de Nahueltoro) (1969) – Chilean biographical crime drama film based on the true story of Jorge Valenzuela Torres, a poor farmer who, during a drunken rampage in 1960, murdered his partner and five of her children
- The Lady of Monza (Italian: La monaca di Monza) (1969) – Italian historical drama film loosely based on the real life events of Marianna de Leyva, better known as "The Nun of Monza", whose story was made famous by Alessandro Manzoni's novel The Betrothed
- Play Dirty (1969) – British war film inspired by the exploits of units such as the Long Range Desert Group, Popski's Private Army and the SAS in North Africa during the Second World War
- Pirosmani (Georgian: ფიროსმანი) (1969) – Soviet era Georgian biographical art drama film about Georgian primitivst painter Niko Pirosmani
- The Red Tent (Russian: Красная палатка; Italian: La tenda rossa) (1969) – Soviet-Italian adventure drama film based on the story of the 1928 mission to rescue Umberto Nobile and the other survivors of the crash of the airship Italia
- Ring of Bright Water (1969) – British comedy drama film about a Londoner and his pet otter living on the Scottish coast, adapted from the 1960 autobiographical book of the same name by Gavin Maxwell
- The Royal Hunt of the Sun (1969) – British-American epic historical drama film dramatizing the relation of two worlds entering in a conflict by portraying two characters: Atahuallpa Inca and Francisco Pizarro
- Simón Bolívar (1969) – Spanish drama film about Venezuelan military and political leader Simón Bolívar who helped much of Latin America to achieve independence from Spain
- Tell Them Willie Boy Is Here (1969) – Western drama film based on the true story of a Chemehuevi–Paiute Native American named Willie Boy and his run-in with the law in 1909 in Banning, California, United States
- Where's Jack? (1969) – British adventure film recounting the exploits of notorious 18th-century criminal Jack Sheppard and London "Thief-Taker General" Jonathan Wild
- Z (1969) – French-Algerian political thriller film presenting a thinly fictionalized account of the events surrounding the assassination of the democratic Greek politician Grigoris Lambrakis in 1963
