= List of people convicted of treason =

This is a list of people convicted of treason.

Some countries have a high constitutional hurdle to conviction for treason, while many countries have less stringent definitions.

== Armenia ==
- Meruzhan Artzruni, Lord Prince of Vaspurakan (? – 369), for conspiring with one of the Great Persian Kings, Shapur II against his liege-lord, Armenian King Arsaces II (Arshak II), whom he betrayed to Persia. He was captured by Arsaces II's son King Papas (Pap) and executed.

== Austria ==
- Count Lajos Batthyány de Németújvár, for involvement in the Hungarian Revolution of 1848. Executed by firing squad on the same day as the 13 Martyrs of Arad.

== Austria-Hungary ==
- Nedeljko Čabrinović, for conspiring to assassinate Archduke Franz Ferdinand
- Vaso Čubrilović, for conspiring to assassinate Archduke Franz Ferdinand
- Veljko Čubrilović, for conspiring to assassinate Archduke Franz Ferdinand
- Trifko Grabez, for conspiring to assassinate Archduke Franz Ferdinand
- Danilo Ilić, for conspiring to assassinate Archduke Franz Ferdinand
- Muhamed Mehmedbašić, for conspiring to assassinate Archduke Franz Ferdinand
- Cvjetko Popović, for conspiring to assassinate Archduke Franz Ferdinand
- Gavrilo Princip, for assassinating Archduke Franz Ferdinand
- Nazario Sauro, for fighting in the Royal Italian Navy in the First World War
- Nikola Posnovski, for threatening to overthrow the government in the First World War

== Canada ==
- Louis Riel, executed for leading the Métis in the North-West Rebellion against Canada's expansion into the west.
- Kanao Inouye, Kamloops-born sergeant in the Imperial Japanese Army in World War II, executed for killing eight Canadian prisoners of war captured at the Battle of Hong Kong.

== China ==
- Zhou Fohai, for serving in the Wang Jingwei government in the Second World War
- Chen Gongbo, for serving in the Wang Jingwei government in the Second World War
- Wang Jingwei, president of the Reorganized National Government of China (puppet government controlled by Japan) in the Second World War
- Wang Lijun, vice-mayor and police chief of Tieling convicted for giving secrets to the U.S. consulate and a British businessman

== Republic of Congo ==
- Pascal Lissouba, former President of the Republic of Congo, was convicted of treason after being overthrown by Denis Sassou Nguesso in the Second Republic of the Congo Civil War

== Czechoslovakia ==
- Karel Čurda, for betraying the Czech Resistance and the assassins of Reinhard Heydrich.

== Denmark ==
- Henrik Kauffmann was charged with grand treason by the Nazi-occupied Danish government for helping the Allied Powers by allowing the United States to occupy Greenland.

== East Germany ==
- Werner Teske was accused, convicted, and executed for "planned treason" by embezzling funds and plotting to defect to West Germany; his sentence was posthumously overturned after German reunification.

== Estonia ==
- Aleksei Dressen
- Herman Simm
- Vladimir Veitman

== Fiji ==
- George Speight, for plotting the Fiji coup of 2000. Death sentence commuted to life in prison.
- Ratu Jope Seniloli, incumbent Vice-President (in 2004), for his role in the coup of 2000. Sentenced to four years in prison; released by a sympathetic government after three months.

== Finland ==
- Lauri Törni, for having served with the Waffen-SS at the end of World War II, later received a presidential pardon

== France ==
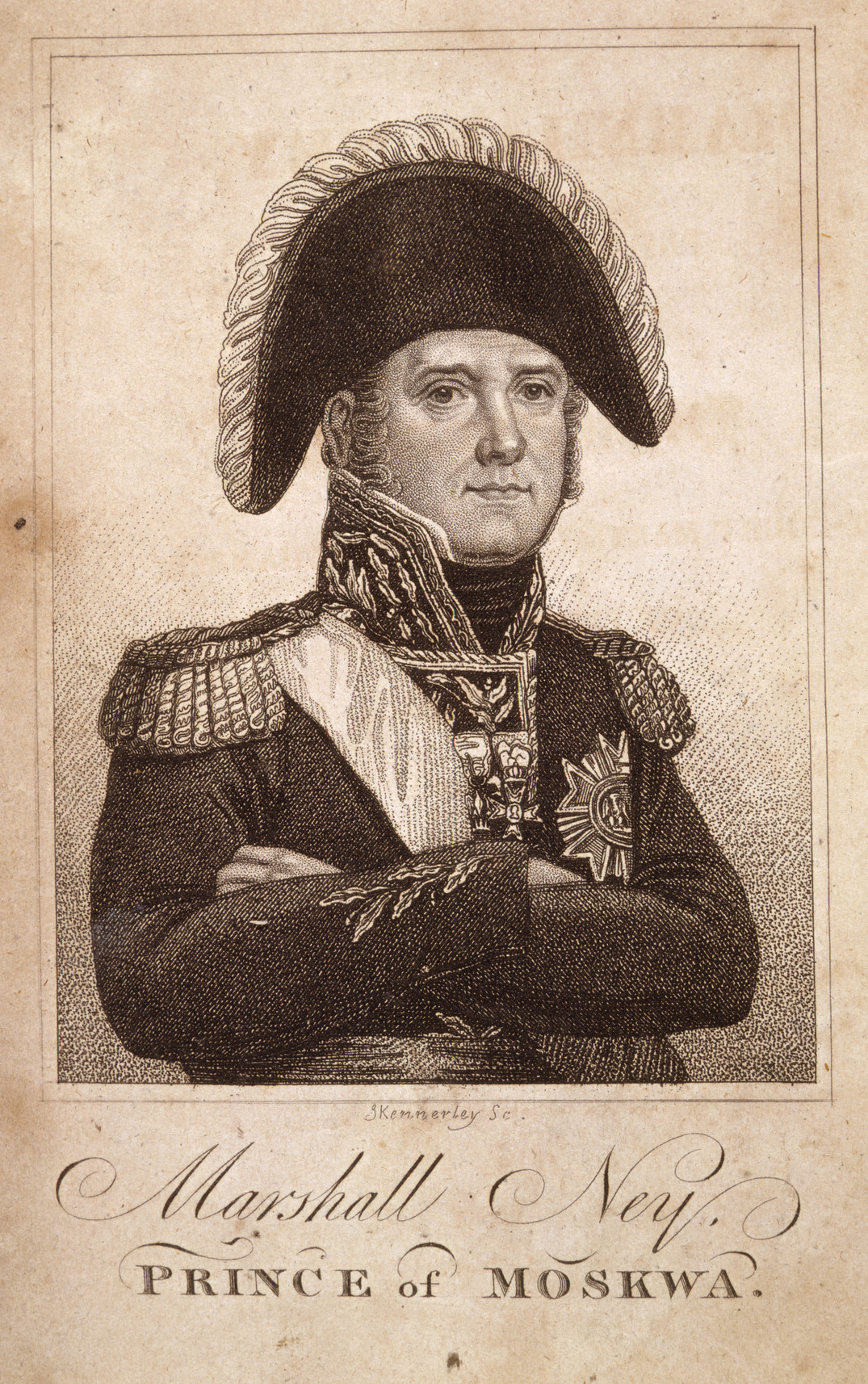
Image taken from Trial of Marshal Ney for high treason taken in short-hand at the time of trial, 1816

- François Achille Bazaine, imprisoned for treason after being blamed for France's loss of the Franco-Prussian War
- Robert Brasillach, for anti-Semitic and fascist writings, including his newspaper Je suis partout, in Vichy France
- Marcel Bucard, for founding the collaborationist Mouvement Franciste and the Legion of French Volunteers Against Bolshevism
- Louis-Ferdinand Céline, for writing anti-Semitic and fascist pamphlets supporting Vichy France
- Cinq-Mars
- Joseph Darnand, for leading the Vichy French Milice.
- Émile Dewoitine, aviation industrialist sentenced to 20 years forced labour sentence for collaboration.
- Charles François Dumouriez
- Isabeau of Bavaria
- John the Fearless
- Pierre Laval, for being Prime Minister of Vichy France.
- Jean Victor Marie Moreau
- Michel Ney
- Philippe Pétain
- Charles Maurice de Talleyrand-Périgord
- Marie Antoinette
- Louis XVI

== Germany ==
- Adolf Hitler, for his role in the Beer Hall Putsch in 1923
- Marinus van der Lubbe, for high treason and arson in the Reichstag fire case, in 1933; the extent of his true responsibility is still disputed by historians
- Anton Schmid, for saving Jews and helping Jewish partisans, in 1942. The Bundeswehr has named two barracks after him.
- Sophie Scholl, Hans Scholl and Christoph Probst in 1943 for their involvement in the anti-Nazi White Rose movement
- Ulrich Wilhelm Graf Schwerin von Schwanenfeld (1902–1944), a key conspirator in the failed assassination attempt in the July 20 plot in 1944 on Hitler's life
- Claus Schenk Graf von Stauffenberg, for the attempted assassination of Hitler in the July 20 plot in 1944
- Günter Guillaume, Private Secretary to then-chancellor Willy Brandt, and his wife Christel Guillaume, both officers of East German Stasi, in 1975
- Clyde Lee Conrad, former U.S. Army non-commissioned officer, the only person to have been handed down a lifetime sentence for treason by a court of the Federal Republic of Germany, in 1990
- Klaus Kuron, counter-intelligence officer with the Bundesverfassungsschutz who had spied for East German Stasi, in 1992

== Great Britain ==
- Archibald Cameron of Locheil, for his part in the 1745 Jacobite rising
- Simon Fraser, 11th Lord Lovat, for his part in the 1745 Jacobite rising
- William Maxwell, 5th Earl of Nithsdale, for supporting the Jacobite rising of 1715
- Thomas Paine, for publishing revolutionary literature supporting the French Revolution and criticizing the British monarchy
- Charles Radclyffe, for supporting the Jacobite rising of 1715

== Greece ==
- Dimitrios Gounaris, Prime Minister of Greece (1921–1922), convicted of treason in 1922 for the Asia Minor catastrophe. Executed 15 November 1922.
- Petros Protopapadakis, Minister of Economy in Dimitrios Gounaris' government and later Prime Minister of Greece (1922), convicted of treason for the Asia Minor catastrophe. Executed 15 November 1922.
- Nikolaos Stratos, Minister of Internal Affairs in Gounaris' government, convicted of treason for the Asia Minor catastrophe. Executed 15 November 1922.
- Georgios Baltatzis, Minister of Foreign Affairs in Gounaris' government, convicted of treason for the Asia Minor catastrophe. Executed 15 November 1922.
- Nikolaos Theotokis, Minister of Military Affairs in Gounaris' government, convicted of treason for the Asia Minor catastrophe. Executed 15 November 1922.
- Georgios Hatzanestis, commanding officer of the Asia Minor and Eastern Thrace Greek army, convicted of treason for the Asia Minor catastrophe. Executed 15 November 1922.
- Michail Goudas, rear admiral and minister in Gounaris' government, convicted of treason for the Asia Minor catastrophe. Sentenced to life imprisonment.
- Xenophon Stratigos, major general and minister in Gounaris' government, convicted of treason for the Asia Minor catastrophe. Sentenced to life imprisonment.
- George Papadopoulos, Greek colonel, leader of a military junta (1967–1973), convicted of treason and jailed for life, died in Korydallos prison 27 June 1999.

== Hawaii ==
The Republic of Hawaii government had one trial for treason after the failed 1895 Counter-Revolution in Hawaii. Those charged were found guilty, but pardoned after serving time in prison.

- Charles T. Gulick (1841–1897), former cabinet minister
- Robert William Wilcox (1855–1903), military leader, later delegate to US Congress

== Hungary ==
- Imre Nagy, Prime Minister of Hungary, for leading the 1956 Hungarian Revolution.
- Count Fidel Palffy
- László Rajk
- Sándor Szűcs, international footballer, for defecting.

== Israel ==
- Meir Tobianski, falsely accused of treason during the 1948 Arab-Israeli war. Executed by firing squad but pardoned after his death.
- Mordechai Vanunu, for revealing details of Israel's nuclear weapons program to the British press in 1986.
- "Prisoner X2", a mole within Mossad.

== Italy ==
- Tullio Cianetti, convicted and sentenced to thirty years imprisonment due to the letter of apology he had written to Benito Mussolini, which saved him from the death penalty, at the Verona trial for voting yes on the 25 July 1943 motion in the Grand Council of Fascism to depose Benito Mussolini. After he was liberated, he went into exile to Portuguese Mozambique where he stayed till his death.
- Emilio De Bono, convicted and executed by firing squad at the Verona trial for voting yes on the 25 July 1943 motion in the Grand Council of Fascism to depose Benito Mussolini.
- Luciano Gottardi, convicted and executed by firing squad at the Verona trial for voting yes on the 25 July 1943 motion in the Grand Council of Fascism to depose Benito Mussolini.
- Giovanni Marinelli, convicted and executed by firing squad at the Verona trial for voting yes on the 25 July 1943 motion in the Grand Council of Fascism to depose Benito Mussolini.
- Carlo Pareschi, convicted and executed by firing squad at the Verona trial for voting yes on the 25 July 1943 motion in the Grand Council of Fascism to depose Benito Mussolini.

== Japan ==
- Ozaki Hotsumi, journalist and Soviet agent (nominally convicted under the Peace Preservation Law)
- Daisuke Namba, Japanese left-wing activist
- Kotoku Shusui, Japanese anarchist

== Kenya ==
- Hezekiah Ochuka, Kenya airforce soldier, for conspiring to overthrow the government of Daniel Moi in 1982

== Kuwait ==
- Alaa Hussein Ali, for heading the Iraqi puppet government during the Gulf War

== Liberia ==
- Edward James Roye, in connection with the 1871 Liberian coup d'état; sentenced to death but died in uncertain circumstances before sentence carried out

== Mexico ==
- Agustín de Iturbide, for fighting for the royalists' army during the Mexican War of Independence.

== Netherlands ==
- Anton Mussert, for leading the Dutch puppet regime under Nazi occupation.

== New Zealand ==
- Patrick Stanley Vaughan Heenan, for passing information to the Japanese during World War II (was not convicted under New Zealand civil law)
- Hamiora Pere, for fighting against the British government in Te Kooti's War; only person executed for treason in New Zealand

== Norway ==
- Albert Viljam Hagelin, member of Quisling's government.
- Vidkun Quisling, for being Minister President of Nazi-occupied Norway during World War II. The word 'quisling' now means 'traitor'.
- Ragnar Skancke, Quisling's minister of Church and Educational Affairs.
- Arne Treholt Norwegian diplomat, turned by the KGB

== Pakistan ==
- Shakil Afridi, for spying for the Central Intelligence Agency of the United States
- Hussain Haqqani, for involvement with a secret memo to Admiral Michael Mullen asking for US intervention in changing Pakistan's military and intelligence agencies.
- Pervez Musharraf, for abrogating and suspending the Pakistani Constitution on 3 November 2007

== Peru ==
- Julio Vargas Garayar, for spying for Chile during the 1970s. Executed in 1979.

== Poland ==
For the betrayal of General Stefan Rowecki to the Gestapo:

- Blanka Kaczorowska ("Sroka"), as above, emigrated to France in 1971
- Ludwik Kalkstein ("Hanka"), protected by the Gestapo during the war, emigrated to France in 1982
- Eugeniusz Świerczewski ("Gens"), executed 1944

For betrayal of the Polish People's Republic:

- Witold Pilecki ("Druh"), death for espionage for the Polish Government-in-exile, executed in 1948, posthumously acquitted in 1990
- Ryszard Kukliński ("Jack Strong"), escaped to the US in 1981, sentenced to death in absentia in 1984, in 1990 sentence changed to 25 years of imprisonment, in 1995 sentence cancelled due to search of the 1st President of the Supreme Court, fully pardoned in 1997
- Adam Kaczmarczyk, death for espionage for MI16, executed in 1969

== Russia ==
- Valentin Danilov – 14 years for espionage for China.
- Mikhail Shein.
- Igor Sutyagin (2004) – 15 years for espionage for USA. Exchanged for Russian spies in 2010.

== Scotland ==
- Robert Baillie, for involvement in the Rye House Plot
- William Ruthven, 1st Earl of Gowrie, for leading the Raid of Ruthven on King James VI
- Murdoch Stewart, 2nd Duke of Albany
- Patrick Stewart, Earl of Orkney, for usurping King James VI on the Orkney Islands

== South Africa ==
- The 1956 Treason Trial was a trial in Johannesburg in which 156 people, including Nelson Mandela, were arrested in a raid and accused of treason by the apartheid regime of South Africa in 1956.

== South Vietnam ==
- Lê Chiêu Thống
- Trần Ích Tắc
- Nguyễn Văn Trỗi

== Soviet Union ==
- Leonid Eitingon, during the Doctors' Plot
- Oleg Penkovsky, for providing GRU intelligence to the United Kingdom and the United States, including during the Cuban Missile Crisis
- Adolf Tolkachev, for providing designs of Soviet military aircraft to the CIA, executed 1986
- Gennady Varenik KGB, worked for CIA
- Andrey Vlasov, for defecting to Nazi Germany during World War II and forming the Russian Liberation Army
- Genrikh Yagoda, during the Great Purge

== Spain ==
- Francisco Xavier Mina, for fighting against the Spanish government in the Mexican War of Independence.
- Camilo Torres Tenorio, for leading the independence movement in Colombia

== Sri Lanka ==
- Velupillai Prabhakaran, the Tamil rebel leader who fought with the government for 30 years.

== Sweden ==
- Gustaf Mauritz Armfelt, attempted to overthrow the guardian-government of King Gustav IV Adolf with Russian military assistance.
- Johann Patkul, protested the land-recovery project of Charles XI of Sweden and, when unsuccessful, sided with Augustus the Strong and tried to wrest Livonia from Sweden.
- Magdalena Rudenschöld, for taking part in the Armfelt conspiracy.
- Brita Tott, for exposing military movements to Denmark
- Stig Wennerström, for espionage activities on behalf of the Soviet Union in 1964.

== Switzerland ==
- Jean-Louis Jeanmaire, sentenced to 18 years of prison (released after 12 for good behavior) for leaking information to the Soviet KGB.

== Turkey ==
- Abdullah Öcalan, life sentence (originally death penalty) for trying to establish a Kurdish state in Turkey.

== Ukraine ==
- Viktor Yanukovych, found guilty of treason in absentia by a Kyiv court. Yanukovych fled Ukraine to Russia after the 2014 Ukrainian Revolution. He was subsequently impeached and tried for treason in absentia.

== United Kingdom ==
- John Amery, for trying to recruit soldiers to the British Free Corps and broadcasting propaganda for Nazi Germany.
- Roger Casement, for negotiating with Germany to provide arms to the Irish Republican Brotherhood during the First World War for use in the Irish Easter 1916 rising; hanged in August 1916.
- William Comstive, Charles Stanfield, Richard Addy, Benjamin Hanson and eighteen others were tried and convicted for High Treason for revolt in the West Riding of Yorkshire in 1820.
- William Joyce, alias 'Lord Haw-Haw', for broadcasting Nazi propaganda to the United Kingdom during World War II. Hanged on 3 January 1946. Last person to be executed for treason in the United Kingdom.
- Members of the British Free Corps: Thomas Haller Cooper and Walter Purdy (death sentences commuted)
- William Smith O'Brien MP, for his part in leading the Young Irelander Rebellion of 1848.
- Arthur Thistlewood, John Brunt, William Davidson, James Ings, Richard Tidd, Charles Cooper, Richard Bradburn, John Harrison, James Wilson and John Shaw Strange participants of the 1820 Cato Street Conspiracy
- James Wilson (revolutionary) convicted and executed for High Treason, following his part in the Scottish Insurrection of 1820.
- Jeremiah Brandreth, Isaac Ludlam and William Turner convicted and executed for High Treason following their part in the Pentrich Revolution of 1817.
- Jaswant Singh Chail convicted of treason and sentenced to 9 years in prison for trying to assassinate Queen Elizabeth II.

== United States ==
- Philip Vigil and John Mitchell, convicted of treason and sentenced to hanging; pardoned by George Washington; see Whiskey Rebellion.
- John Fries, the leader of Fries' Rebellion, was convicted of treason in 1800 along with two accomplices, and pardoned that same year by John Adams.
- Governor Thomas Dorr 1844, convicted of treason against the state of Rhode Island; see Dorr Rebellion; released in 1845; civil rights restored in 1851; verdict annulled in 1854.
- Hipolito Salazar, hanged on April 9, 1847. Convicted of treason for rebelling against the military occupation of New Mexico in the Taos Revolt during the Mexican-American War. He was a Mexican citizen on then-Mexican soil, and George W. Crawford, Secretary of War in the Zachary Taylor administration, later concluded that Salazar had been wrongfully convicted.
- John Brown, abolitionist, the first person executed for treason within the United States, convicted in 1859 of treason against the Commonwealth of Virginia, murder, and fomenting a slave insurrection for his part in the Harpers Ferry raid.
- Aaron Dwight Stevens took part in John Brown's raid and was executed in 1860 for treason against Virginia.
- William Bruce Mumford, convicted of treason and hanged in 1862 for tearing down a United States flag during the American Civil War.
- Walter Allen was convicted of treason on September 16, 1922 for taking part in the 1921 Miner's March against the coal companies and the U.S. Army at Blair Mountain, West Virginia. He was sentenced to 10 years and fined. During his appeal to the Supreme Court, he disappeared while out on bail. United Mineworkers of America leader William Blizzard was acquitted of the charge of treason by the jury on May 25, 1922.
- Max Stephan, a German-born Detroit tavernkeeper, was convicted of treason on July 2, 1942, after the jury deliberated for only one hour and 23 minutes. In April 1942, Stephan harbored and fed a Luftwaffe pilot at his tavern who escaped from a Canadian POW camp. On August 6, Judge Arthur J. Tuttle sentenced Stephan to death by hanging. He was the first man convicted and sentenced to death on a federal treason charge since the Civil War. His sentence was later commuted by President Franklin D. Roosevelt to life in prison.
- Hans Max Haupt, Walter Otto Froehling and Otto Richard Wergin were convicted of treason and sentenced to death, and Erna Emma Haupt, Lucille Froehling and Kate Martha Wergin were convicted of treason and sentenced to 25 years in prison on November 24, 1942, in a joint indictment. All six individuals were charged with treason for giving aid and comfort to the executed German saboteur Herbert Hans Haupt. On appeal, these judgments were reversed and remanded to be retried. Hans Max Haupt was convicted again on June 9, 1944. He was sentenced to life in prison. He appealed again, but the Seventh Circuit Court of Appeals affirmed this judgement. Walter Otto Froehling and Otto Richard Wergin were sentenced to 5 years in prison on July 22, 1944 as accessories to treason. Hans Max Haupt eventually appealed the case up to the Supreme Court, which sustained the verdict against him.
- Martin James Monti, United States Army Air Forces pilot, convicted of treason for defecting to the Waffen-SS in 1944. He was paroled in 1960.
- Douglas Chandler, worker for National Geographic, convicted of treason in 1947 for defecting to Germany during World War II, sentence commuted by President John F. Kennedy.
- Robert Henry Best, convicted of treason on April 16, 1948, and served a life sentence.
- Iva Toguri D'Aquino, who is frequently identified by the name "Tokyo Rose", convicted 1949. Subsequently pardoned by President Gerald Ford.
- Mildred Gillars, also known as "Axis Sally", convicted of treason on March 8, 1949; served 12 years of a 10- to 30-year prison sentence.
- Herbert John Burgman, convicted in 1949 of treason during WWII for spreading Nazi propaganda; sentenced to 6–20 years in prison.
- Tomoya Kawakita, sentenced to death for treason in 1952, but eventually released by President John F. Kennedy to be deported to Japan.

== Zambia ==
- Steven Lungu, also known as Captain Solo. Sentenced to death for an attempted coup in 1997, he was pardoned in 2010 by President Rupiah Banda.

== Zimbabwe ==
- Ndabaningi Sithole, for conspiring to kill Robert Mugabe

== See also ==
- Treason trial
