= The Verona Trial =

- Directed by: Carlo Lizzani
- Written by: Sergio Amidei; Ugo Pirro
- Produced by: Dino De Laurentiis
- Starring: Silvana Mangano
- Cinematography: Leonida Barboni
- Music by: Mario Nascimbene
- Release date: 2 March 1963
- Running time: 120 minutes
- Country: Italy
- Language: Italian

Il processo di Verona (internationally released as The Verona Trial) is a 1963 Italian historical drama film directed by Carlo Lizzani. The film tells of the final phases of the Italian fascist regime, in particular the affair of the 1944 Verona trial, in which Galeazzo Ciano, Emilio De Bono, Giovanni Marinelli and other eminent Fascist officials (Carlo Pareschi and Luciano Gottardi) were sentenced to death and almost immediately executed by a shooting detachment, while Tullio Cianetti was sentenced to 30 years imprisonment.

For her portrayal of Edda Mussolini-Ciano, Silvana Mangano won the two major Italian film awards, the David di Donatello for Best Actress and the Silver Ribbon in the same category.

== Cast ==
- Silvana Mangano as Edda Ciano (Mussolini's daughter; Ciano's wife)
- Frank Wolff as count Galeazzo Ciano (Mussolini's son-in-law and former Minister of Foreign Affairs)
- Vivi Gioi as Donna Rachele (Mussolini's wife)
- Françoise Prévost as Frau Beetz (a member of a German Secret Service)
- Salvo Randone as Andrea Fortunato (public prosecutor)
- Giorgio De Lullo as Alessandro Pavolini
- Ivo Garrani as Roberto Farinacci
- Andrea Checchi as Dino Grandi
- Henri Serre as Emilio Pucci
- Claudio Gora as Judge as Vincenzo Cersosimo
- Carlo D'Angelo as Console Vianini
- Umberto D'Orsi as Luciano Gottardi
- Filippo Scelzo as Giovanni Marinelli
- Andrea Bosic as Tullio Cianetti
- Gennaro Di Gregorio as Emilio De Bono
