= Anfuso =

Anfuso is an Italian surname, and may refer to:

- Filippo Anfuso (1901–1963), Italian writer, diplomat and Fascist politician
- Victor Anfuso (1905–1966), Democratic member of the United States House of Representatives

== See also ==
- Alfonso of Capua, also called Anfuso
