= Giuseppe Solaro =

Italian Fascist politician and soldier

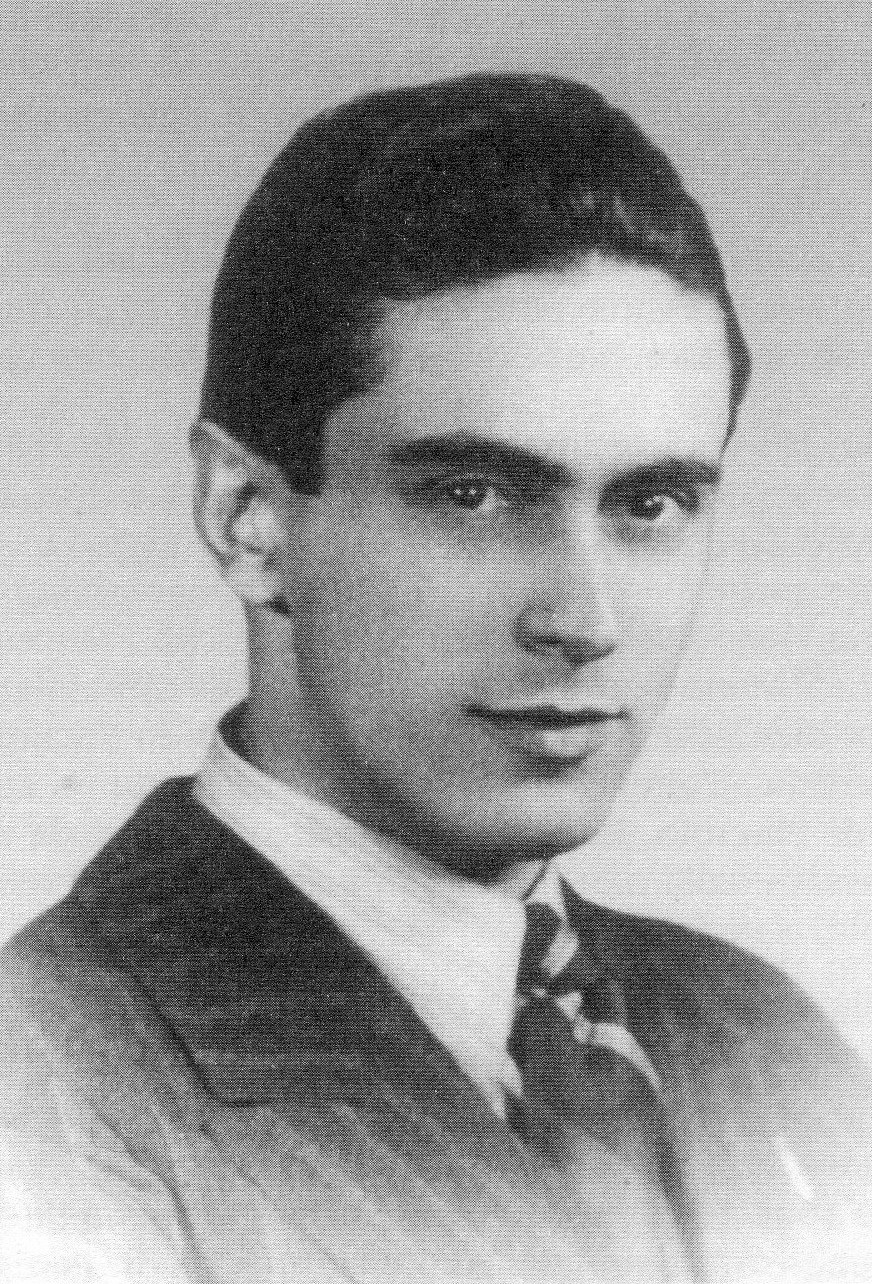

Federal Secretary of the Republican Fascist Party of Turin
- In office 8 October 1943 – 23 April 1945
- Preceded by: office established
- Succeeded by: Mario Pavia
- Regional Inspector of the Black Brigades of Piedmont
- In office 23 April 1945 – 27 April 1945

Personal details
- Born: 16 May 1914 Turin, Kingdom of Italy
- Died: 29 April 1945 (aged 30) Turin, Italy
- Party: National Fascist Party; Republican Fascist Party

Military service
- Allegiance: Kingdom of Italy; Italian Social Republic
- Branch/service: Royal Italian Army; MVSN; Black Brigades
- Commands: 1st Black Brigade "Ather Capelli"
- Battles/wars: Spanish Civil War; Battle of Bilbao; World War II; Italian Civil War

Giuseppe Solaro (16 May 1914 – 29 April 1945) was an Italian Fascist politician and soldier, federal secretary of the Republican Fascist Party of Turin during the Italian Social Republic.

== Biography ==
Born into a working-class family, the son of a railway worker, Solaro graduated as a surveyor before enrolling in the Faculty of Economics and Commerce of the University of Turin in November 1936, joining local the Fascist University Group (GUF), of which he soon became leader. A member of the so-called Fascist left wing, he started writing articles on economic matters for various magazines. Also in November 1936 he married Martina Magnani, known as Tina. On February 14, 1937 he volunteered for the Spanish Civil War as an officer of the Voluntary Militia for National Security (MVSN), participating in the early stages of the Battle of Bilbao, although at the time of the fall of the city he was on leave. Having returned to Italy, he was hired as a surveyor at the Municipality of Turin.

In 1940, after the beginning of the Second World War, he was recalled into service as a reserve artillery officer in the Royal Italian Army, while continuing to write newspaper articles and essays on geopolitics. In June 1940, a few days Italy's entry into the war, he graduated in economics, and in October 1940 he founded the Center for Economic and Social Studies, while writing in the national newspaper La Stampa and in the magazine of the provincial Federation of the National Fascist Party.

After the Armistice of Cassibile, Solaro joined the Italian Social Republic, and on 16 September 1943 he was appointed to lead the Republican Fascist Party (PFR) of Turin, governing in a triumvirate along with Luigi Riva and Blackshirt General Domenico Mittica. Solaro's appointment was decided by Alessandro Pavolini, who appreciated young people from the School of Fascist Mysticism, which he saw as an intellectual reference point from which to draw the new leadership. On September 30 Paolo Zerbino was appointed head of the Province of Turin, and on 8 October the local Fascist leaders met and divided their tasks; Solaro became federal secretary of the local section of the PFR, Riva was made commander of the Fasce of Turin and deputy federal secretary of the PFR, and Mittica was appointed commander of the Fascist Youth as well as liaison with the MVSN.

Partisan attacks on local Fascists soon began, while larger partisan groups formed on the nearby mountains; on 31 October Riva and Count Federico Gaschi led a punitive expedition against partisans in the Val di Susa, despite Solaro's prohibition, but the expedition ended in disaster, suffering several casualties including Riva, who was killed. Solaro then had Count Gaschi placed under arrest. Starting from November 15, FIAT workers began a strike which soon extended to other factories, owing to low wages that were insufficient due to the rising cost of life; Solaro went to Fiat Mirafiori to speak with the workers and persuaded the German authorities to a grant a 30% wage increase in December. While facing these problems, Solaro also had to keep under control the diverging currents within the local PFR, several of which were trying to split and form their own party.

Solaro followed with particular attention the implementation of decrees on the socialization of the means of production, promoting initiatives among workers (such as conferences and printing of brochures) in order to inform them of the contents of the new social legislation. In April 1944 he started a "Course of preparation of workers for socialization" to be held in eleven lessons. Along with Zerbino, he denounced to Mussolini the alleged agreement between the Fiat management and the German command aimed at boycotting any initiative aimed at socializing the economy. On 2 December 1944 he appointed Fiat worker and Fascist syndicalist Michele Fassio as the new podestà of Turin.

Solaro as federale of Turin

On 19 July 1944 Solaro assumed command of the newly founded 1st Black Brigade "Ather Capelli" of Turin (one of the largest Black Brigades, with some 2,000 members), which on 20 April 1945 he led in an attack on the town of Chieri, which was sacked and set ablaze, with twenty-five inhabitants taken as hostages. On April 23, 1945, Solaro was promoted to Regional Inspector of the Black Brigades, while Mario Pavia replaced him as federal secretary of the PFR. The collapse of the Italian Social Republic was however imminent, and the city's military leaders, headed by General Enrico Adami Rossi, decided to leave Turin and retreat towards the Valtellina, while Solaro tried in vain to persuade them to stay. Probably underestimating the actual strength of the partisan movement, Solaro argued the need to oppose at least a symbolic resistance in the city, and organized franc-tireur groups tasked with countering the entrance of the partisans into the city with the aim of "making Turin an Alcazar" and resist until the arrival of the Allied forces.

On the morning of April 26, Solaro ordered the withdrawal from the Bank of Italy of a sum sufficient to pay the overdue wages of all soldiers. Finding it closed, he went instead to the Cassa di Risparmio where, having obtained a refusal from the director, he broke down the gate with an armored vehicle and withdrew seventeen and a half million lire. After the departure of ENR troops, which rendered all plans to defend the city unfeasible, in the morning of the April 27 Solaro demobilized the Black Brigades and handed them all the money withdrawn in the morning as a demobilization bonus. He refused to join the departing ENR column and hid in the cellars of the local agricultural consortium with three of his followers, but in the morning of 28 April they were discovered and captured by a partisan squad. Despite the demobilization of the Black Brigade of Turin, some groups of franc-tireurs still enacted the planned last-ditch defense of the city, sniping on the partisans and killing about three hundred people.

After being recognized, Solaro was interrogated by the partisans; according to Communist leaders Giorgio Amendola and Osvaldo Negarville, he denied being a Fascist, claimed to have Communist sympathies and tried to shift responsibility for his actions to other Fascist leaders. In the morning of 29 April he was summarily tried and sentenced to death by a partisan court. After writing a last letter to his wife, (Note: "Dear Tina, before I die, I express all my love and devotion to you. I have been honest all my life and honest I die for an idea. May it help Italy on the way to redemption and reconstruction. Remember me and love me, as I have always loved Italy. Dear Tina, long live free Italy, long live the Duce! Your Peppino.") Solaro was hanged from a tree in Corso Vinzaglio, in the same spot where nine months earlier four partisans had been hanged in retaliation for the wounding of an RSI officer. He had to be hanged twice, as the branch of the tree broke on the first attempt. His body was carried through the streets of Turin and then thrown into the Po river from the Isabella Bridge.
