= Falcone Lucifero =

Italian politician (1898–1997)

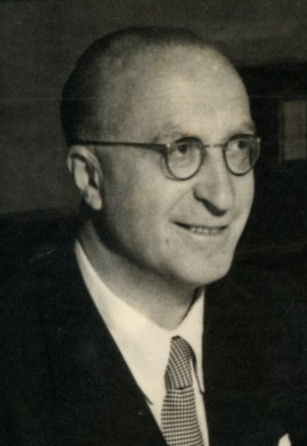

Minister of Agriculture and Forests of the Kingdom of Italy
- In office 11 February 1944 – 22 April 1944
- Preceded by: Alessandro Brizi
- Succeeded by: Fausto Gullo
- Minister to the Royal Household of the Kingdom of Italy
- In office 4 June 1944 – 13 June 1946
- Preceded by: Pietro d'Acquarone
- Succeeded by: office abolished

Prefect of Catanzaro
- In office 10 October 1943 – 11 February 1944
- Preceded by: Pietro Monzoni
- Succeeded by: Giovan Battista Pontiglione

Prefect of Bari
- In office 20 May 1944 – 1 August 1944
- Preceded by: Giuseppe Li Voti
- Succeeded by: Antonio Antonucci

Personal details
- Born: 3 January 1898 Crotone, Kingdom of Italy
- Died: 2 May 1997 (aged 99) Rome, Italy
- Party: Italian Socialist Party; National Fascist Party
- Civilian awards: Supreme Order of the Most Holy Annunciation; Order of Saints Maurice and Lazarus; Order of the Crown of Italy

Military service
- Allegiance: Kingdom of Italy
- Branch/service: Royal Italian Army
- Battles/wars: World War I
- Military awards: War Merit Cross

Marquis Falcone Lucifero (Crotone, 3 January 1898 – Rome, 2 May 1997) was an Italian politician, who served as Minister of Agriculture and Forests of the Kingdom of Italy in the Badoglio I Cabinet, and Minister of the Royal House from 1944 to 1946. After the abolition of the monarchy in Italy he remained in the country as Umberto II’s official representative.

== Biography ==
The son of Armando Lucifero and cousin of Roberto Lucifero d'Aprigliano, he was born into a noble family. At the end of the First World War, in which he participated as an officer, he graduated in law in Turin. In 1920 he was elected to the municipal council of Crotone, his hometown; in the same year he joined the Unitary Socialist Party, which however he left after two years to join the National Fascist Party. However, after the establishment of the Fascist regime he retired from political life, practicing the profession of lawyer. Following the fall of the regime, on 25 July 1943, the first Badoglio government appointed him prefect of Catanzaro and then of Bari, and from 11 February to 22 April 1944 he served as Minister of Agriculture in the same government, replacing Alessandro Brizi.

On 4 June 1944 Umberto of Savoy, Lieutenant-General of the Realm, appointed him as Minister of the Royal House, replacing Pietro d'Acquarone. During the following two years Lucifero was thus the main liaison between the royal family and the government; after the end of the war, he organized the campaign in favor of the monarchy in the run-up to the institutional referendum of 2 June 1946. After the defeat of the monarchy in the referendum, from 2 to 13 June 1946 he managed the delicate transitional phase, and on 13 June, following the attribution by the Council of Ministers of the powers of provisional head of state to the head of government Alcide De Gasperi, he drafted the text of the last proclamation of King Umberto II.

After the King's departure for exile in Portugal, he remained his only official representative in Italy. In this capacity he represented the former king on the occasion of the funerals of the victims of the Vajont disaster and of those of the Years of Lead, as well as at those of Popes Pius XII, John XXIII, Paul VI and John Paul I and at the enthronement ceremonies of their successors. He also dealt with the charitable activity of Umberto II and his contacts with the political world. In 1948 he was offered the post of senator for life by President Luigi Einaudi, but declined the offer. On 4 September 1969, on the occasion of his sixty-fifth birthday, Umberto II appointed him a Knight of the Supreme Order of the Most Holy Annunciation; the only case in nearly forty years, along with that of Vittorio Cini, of granting the highest honor of the House of Savoy to a personality who was neither a head of state nor a member of a royal dynasty.

On 18 March 1983, after the death of Umberto, he was ousted from his role by the son of the former king, Vittorio Emanuele of Savoy. During his final years he published essays, biographies, literary and theatrical works, collaborated with newspapers and periodicals, and remained a staunch monarchist to the end, always claiming that the 1946 referendum was invalid, in interviews given as late as 1996. He died in Rome in 1997, and as dictated in his last will, he was buried in the monumental cemetery of Crotone, to whose municipal library, named after his father Armando Lucifero, he had donated his voluminous private correspondence in 1996. His diaries from 1944 to 1946 were published in 2002 with the title L'ultimo re (The Last King).
