= Treason trial =

List of criminal trials

A treason trial is a criminal trial. It may refer to:

== List ==
Event	Date	Location	Notes
Caprivi treason trial	2003–ongoing	Namibia	Caprivi conflict
Delmas Treason Trial	1985–88	South Africa	Apartheid
1956 Treason Trial	1956	South Africa	Apartheid
Indian National Army trials	1945–46	British India	World War II
Memel Trial	1934–35	Lithuania	Nazi
Salonika Trial	1917	Austria-Hungary	
Sarajevo Trial	1914	Austria-Hungary	Assassination of Archduke Franz
High Treason Incident	1911	Japan	Assassination plot
Friedjung Trial	1909	Austria-Hungary	
Agram Trial	1909	Austria-Hungary	Serbian conspiration
Omladina Trial	1894	Austria-Hungary	Radicalism
Trial of Louis Riel	1885	Canada	Rebellion
Christiana Treason Trial	1851	United States	Slave riots
Burr conspiracy	1806–07	United States	
1794 Treason Trials	1794	Great Britain	Radicalism

== See also ==
- List of people convicted of treason
