= Monumental Cemetery of Crotone =

Cemetery in Crotone, Italy

- Cimitero monumentale di Crotone
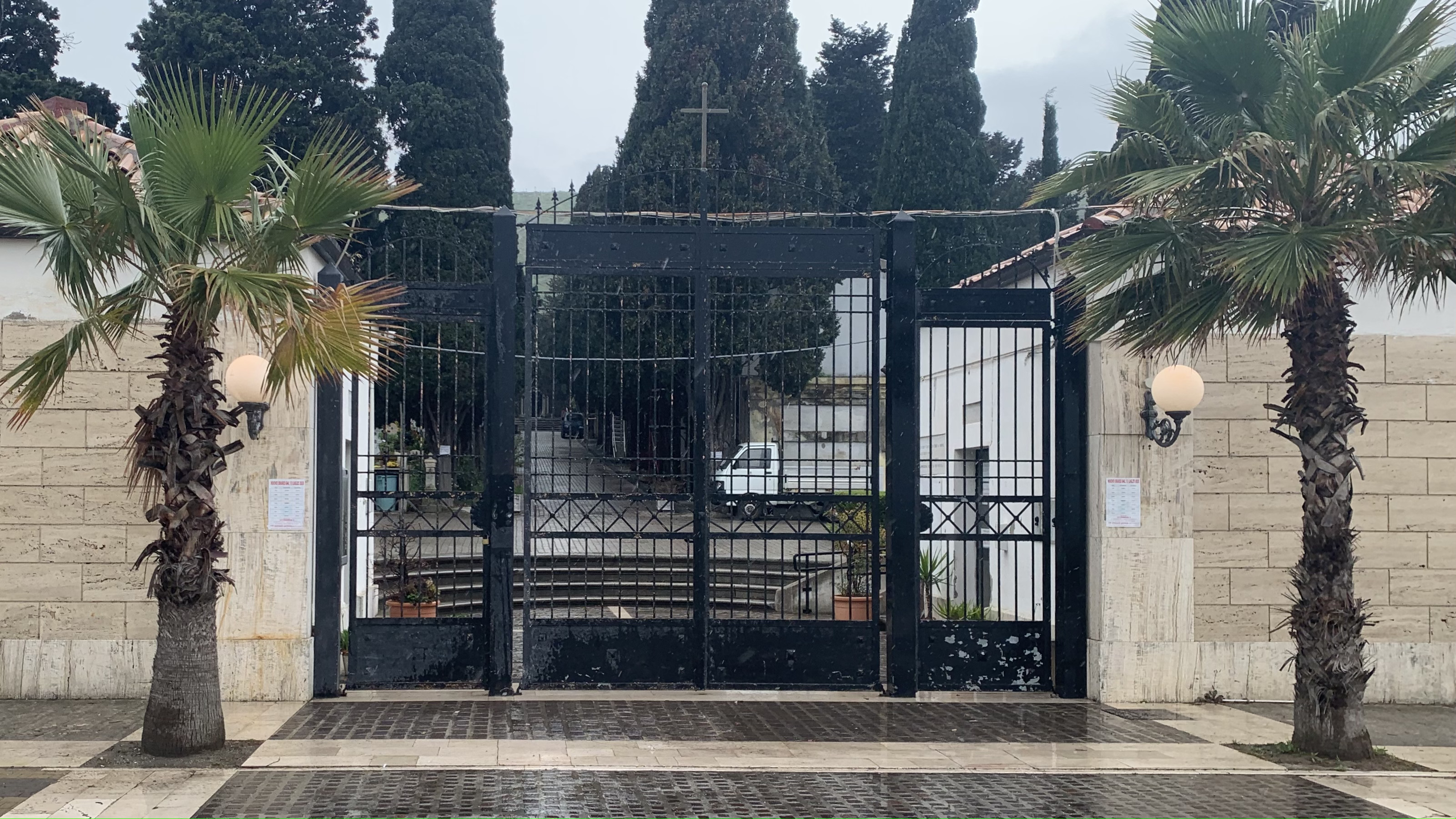
- Interactive map of Monumental Cemetery of Crotone

Details
- Established: 2 February 1843; 183 years ago
- Location: Viale Antonio Gramsci, 2; 88900 Crotone, Calabria
- Country: Italy
- Coordinates: 39°03′56″N 17°07′52″E
- Type: Multireligious
- Style: Monumental Eclecticism
- Owned by: City of Crotone
- Size: 45,500 m^{2} (490,000 sq ft)

The Monumental Cemetery of Crotone (Italian: Cimitero monumentale di Crotone) is the monumental cemetery of the city of Crotone, located in the Calabria region of Italy.

It is situated in the southern part of the city, opposite the seafront along Viale Antonio Gramsci, covering an area of 4.55 hectares.

== History ==
The cemetery was inaugurated on 2 February 1843. Its location represented a significant change in local burial practices, as interments moved from church interiors to designated spaces outside of urban centers, in accordance with hygienic reforms introduced in the 19th century. These reforms were shaped by the 1804 Edict of Saint-Cloud, issued during Napoleon's rule in Italy and later reinforced by the Medical Police Edict of 5 September 1806. Beforehand, local burials took place in locations of worship such as the Cathedral of Crotone, the Convent of the Observance, and the Church of the Carmine. Following its establishment, the cemetery was neglected for decades under the management of various municipal administrations.

In the late 19th century, site renovations transformed the cemetery into a more formally organized and structured burial site. In 1893, it expanded to include private chapels commissioned by Crotone’s wealthiest families, elevating its reputation from a simple communal burial ground to a monumental site adorned with structures. These chapels, often inspired by classical temple forms, featured wrought iron gates and allegorical symbols such as skulls, winged hourglasses, inverted torches, and floral wreaths, representing the belief in the cycle of life and death and the soul's passage to eternity.

The chapel of Baron Luigi Berlingieri (1816–1900), constructed between 1895 and 1896, is characterized as exemplifying the funerary architecture of the era, one of mixing elegance and simplicity. Other chapels often deemed aesthetically and monumentally noteworthy include those of the Giglio, Asturi, and Lucente families. The cemetery's artistic and cultural importance grew further in 1897 with the addition of a central stone cross, initiated by Friar Luigi Covelli, and placed at the intersection of the main avenues. This cross became a focal point for visitors and a testament to the community's Christian character. Earlier, in 1890, the Crotone municipality had classified the road connecting the cemetery to the city as a municipal road to ensure better access, with construction of the road upgrade beginning in 1893.

The cemetery's administration faced numerous challenges in the 20th century, including maintaining hygienic standards as required by the 1864 sanitary regulations, which imposed strict rules on transportation and burial practices. Funerals were mandated to take place during daylight hours, and processions were prohibited after sunset to ensure public health and decorum. Friar Armando Camposano (1879–1953), chaplain of the cemetery from 1903, compiled a report in 1910 on the cemetery's condition, arguing for its preservation as a place of memory and respect. Camposano, later archdeacon of the Cathedral of Crotone, also documented efforts to formalize regulations. These included Ordinance No. 251, issued by Mayor Carlo Turano, which outlined rules for access and use of the cemetery. In January 1944, facing significant financial challenges during World War II, the Crotone municipality, under Commissioner Orazio Laino (1888–1944), introduced measures to increase revenue. These included doubling the fees for land use in the municipal cemetery, particularly for the construction of cappelle gentilizie (English: family chapels), from 100 to 200 lire per square meter. This adjustment was part of a broader strategy to revise local taxation and address the financial strain caused by wartime conditions and the ongoing economic crisis.

== Individual Memorials ==
The cemetery includes the graves of the following individuals:

- Anselmo Berlingeri (1852–1911), politician, former mayor of Crotone
- Luigi Berlingeri (1816–1900), politician, former mayor of Crotone
- Rocco Gaetani (1957–2020), politician
- Domenico Lucente (1943–2022), politician, former mayor of Crotone
- Raffaele Lucente (1831–1890), politician, former mayor of Crotone
- Falcone Lucifero (1898–1997), former Minister to the Royal Household of the Kingdom of Italy
- Giulio Marino (1842–1901), gardener and superintendent of Crotone's public gardens, vividly depicted by George Gissing in By the Ionian Sea
- Tina Nicoletta (1961–2023), songwriter, musician and writer
- Giuseppe Pugliese (1947–2020), politician
- Giovanni Scalise (1883–1968), painter
- Ezio Scida (1915–1946), footballer, for whom the eponymous stadium is named
- Nicola Sculco (1846–1913), historian
- Riccardo Sculco (1858–1931), physician and politician
- Pasquale Senatore (1940–2015), politician, former mayor of Crotone
- Giancarlo Sitra (1949–2020), politician
- Carlo Turano (1864–1926), politician, former mayor of Crotone
- Luigi Vrenna (1909–1992), a mafia member of the 'Ndrangheta

== Cultural references ==
The cemetery has attracted the attention of international figures, including English writer George Gissing, who visited Crotone between 1897 and 1898. In his travelogue By the Ionian Sea: Notes of a Ramble in Southern Italy, Gissing described the cemetery as a unique and evocative place, noting how the chapels reflected respect for the deceased and symbolized Crotone's collective memory. This literary account brought the cemetery to a broader audience, shedding light on its cultural and spiritual significance.

Gissing's journey was inspired by the earlier travels of French archaeologist François Lenormant, who explored Southern Italy in the late 19th century. Lenormant's work La Grande Grèce detailed his explorations of Magna Graecia's ancient sites, including those in Calabria. His writings influenced subsequent travelers, such as Scottish writer Norman Douglas, who retraced these routes in his 1915 book Old Calabria. Both authors, like Gissing, were captivated by the region's history and cultural heritage, contributing to a wider European appreciation of Southern Italy's archaeological and historical heritage.

== See also ==
- Crotone
- List of cemeteries in Italy
