= Alessandro Brizi =

Italian politician

Minister of Agriculture and Forests of the Kingdom of Italy
- In office 27 July 1943 – 11 February 1944
- Preceded by: Carlo Pareschi
- Succeeded by: Falcone Lucifero
- Member of the Chamber of Fasces and Corporations
- In office 23 March 1939 – 6 February 1943
- Member of the Senate of the Kingdom of Italy
- In office 6 February 1943 – 5 March 1946

Personal details
- Born: 7 September 1878 Melicucco, Kingdom of Italy
- Died: 14 January 1955 (aged 76) Rome, Italy

Alessandro Brizi (Poggio Nativo, 7 September 1878 – Rome, 14 January 1955) was an Italian agronomist, economist and politician, who served as Minister of Agriculture and Forests of the Kingdom of Italy in the Badoglio I Cabinet, the first after the fall of the Fascist regime.

== Biography ==
He was born in the province of Rieti to Eugenio Brizi, a patriot of Mazzinian ideas, and Anna Maria Antonini. After attending school in Assisi, from which his family originally hailed from, he graduated in agricultural sciences from the University of Pisa. Starting from 1900 he began to work at the Itinerant Schools of Agriculture in the provinces of Ferrara, Parma, Chieti and Cremona, initially as assistant and later as teacher and director. In 1908 he started to work as an inspector at the Ministry of Agriculture, of which he became director-general from 1918 to 1928, when he started teaching agricultural economics and politics at the Higher School of Agriculture of Portici. From 1925 he was member of the Permanent Committee on Grain during the so-called Battle for Grain.

From 1929 to 1939 he served as secretary-general of the International Institute of Agriculture, and in 1939 he became a member of the Chamber of Fasces and Corporations. In 1943 he was appointed Senator of the Kingdom and made head of cabinet of the Ministry of Finance by Giacomo Acerbo; after the fall of Fascism on 25 July 1943, he was appointed Minister of Agriculture and Forestry in the Badoglio I Cabinet. At the proclamation of the armistice of Cassibile, on 8 September 1943, he was presiding over a meeting at the Ministry of Agriculture on the procurement of agricultural goods, and did not follow the rest of their government in their flight from Rome to Brindisi. He then retired with his family in Assisi, albeit he formally kept his post as Minister until February 1944.

After the end of the war, due to his ties to the Fascist regime, Brizi was forfeited of his seat as a Senator by the High Court for Sanctions against Fascism, and resigned from his chair at the School of Agriculture of Portici. In the following years he published books and wrote for agricultural magazines, and became vice president of the European Federation of Farmers as well as president of the Italian Institute of Genetics until 1952. He continued his work on agricultural problems until his death, which occurred in 1955.
