= Ather Capelli =

Italian journalist (1902–1944)

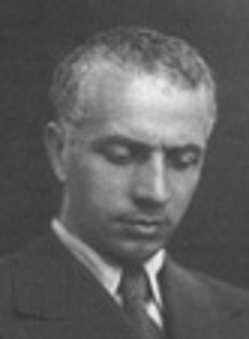
- Ather Capelli
- Born: October 31, 1902 Ferrara, Italy
- Died: March 31, 1944 (aged 41) Turin, Italy
- Occupation: Journalist, propagandist

Ather Capelli (31 October 1902 – 31 March 1944) was an Italian journalist.

Capelli joined the Italian Fascist Party as a young man and participated in the March on Rome.

In the 1920s and 1930s he collaborated with numerous newspapers and wrote plays and theatrical works that were staged by the amateur dramatic company Sursumcorda. At this time he also participated in several military operations in eastern Africa, where he was seriously wounded.

After the entry of Italy into the Second World War he requested to be permitted to enlist in the Italian army, but his offer was rejected due to his serious disability. Thus he continued his journalism, ultimately joining the editorial staff of the Turin newspaper Gazzetta del Popolo.

He supported the Fascist Italian Social Republic after the 3 September 1943 armistice between Italy and the Allies. On 20 September 1943 he became the editor of the Gazzetta del Popolo. After 17 January 1944 he was also editor of the weekly Illustrazione del Popolo, a supplement to the Gazzetta del Popolo.

On 31 March 1944 he was killed by partisans Giovanni Pesce and Giuseppe Bravin, who lay in wait for him near his residence. Pesce, the head of the Patriotic Action Group (GAP) of Turin, recalled the attack in his memoirs, in which he labelled Capelli as "one of the most despicable figures in the Fascist propaganda apparatus" and "the bloodthirsty inciter of reprisals."

To retaliate for his killing, on 2 April 1944 in the Via Morghen in Turin, five prisoners were shot: Domenico Binelli, Angelo Caligaris, Domenico Cane, Ferdinando Conti, and Giuseppe Igonetti.

The First Black Brigade, founded in Turin on 19 July 1944 and led by Giuseppe Solaro, was named for Capelli in his honor.
