= Domenico Mittica =

Italian Fascist politician and Blackshirt general

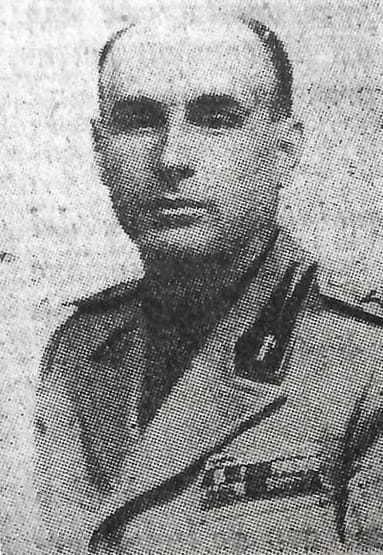
- Born: 11 July 1894; Sant'Ilario dello Ionio, Kingdom of Italy
- Died: 12 January 1944 (aged 49); Greggio, Italian Social Republic
- Military career
- Allegiance: Kingdom of Italy; Italian Social Republic
- Branch: Royal Italian Army; MVSN; Guardia Nazionale Repubblicana
- Rank: Brigadier General
- Commands: 215th Blackshirt Battalion; 1st University Legion "Prince of Piedmont"; 1st Blackshirt Battalion "Sierra Avila"; 45th Assault Blackshirt Legion "Alto Adige"; 63rd Assault Blackshirt Legion "Tagliamento"; 1st Blackshirt Zone
- Conflicts: World War I; Battle of Asiago; Second Italo-Ethiopian War; Battle of Amba Aradam; Spanish Civil War; Battle of the Ebro; World War II; Greco-Italian War; Italian campaign on the Eastern Front
- Awards: Silver Medal of Military Valor (four times); Bronze Medal of Military Valor; War Cross of Military Valor (three times); Order of the Crown of Italy; Order of Saints Maurice and Lazarus; Iron Cross Second Class

Domenico Mittica (11 July 1894 – 12 January 1944) was an Italian Fascist politician and a Blackshirt general during World War II.

== Biography ==
He was born in Sant'Ilario dello Ionio, province of Reggio Calabria, on 11 July 1894, the son of Giuseppe Mittica and Teresa Palmisani. After the Kingdom of Italy entered World War I on 24 May 1915 he arrived enlisted in the Royal Italian Army with the rank of second lieutenant, reaching the front on 17 August. On 3 June 1916, while serving in the 212th Infantry Regiment "Pescara", he was captured on Monte Cengio during the battle of Asiago; he spent the rest of the war in captivity, finally returning to Italy on 26 November 1918. In April 1920 he enrolled in the engineering faculty of the University of Messina; on 3 October 1920 he joined the Fascist movement by becoming a member of the Reggio Calabria section of the National Fascist Party, and in 1921 he moved to Turin, where he later graduated in engineering at the local Polytechnic. In 1922 he participated in the March on Rome, and shortly thereafter he joined the National Security Voluntary Militia (MVSN). At the end of 1925 he was appointed secretary of the Fascist University Groups (GUF) of Turin, a post he held until the end of 1929, when he was replaced by Guido Pallotta. During his office he was among the promoters of the magazine of the Turin GUF, Rivista Universitaria.

In 1931 he was appointed member of the Directory of the Turin section of the National Fascist Party, and in 1933 he was among the organizers of the University World Games. At the outbreak of the war with Ethiopia, on 23 September 1935 he volunteered for the front with the rank of seniore (Major) in the 4th CC.NN. Division "3 Gennaio". He participated in the battle of Amba Aradam and was awarded a War Cross for Military Valor, after which he was given command of the 215th Blackshirt Battalion, which he held until the end of the war.

On his return to Turin he assumed command of the 1st University Legion "Prince of Piedmont". After the outbreak of the Spanish Civil War he volunteered again and was given command of the 1st Battalion "Sierra Avila" of the 1st "Blue Arrows" Regiment of the Flechas Azules Division. He took part in the battle of the Ebro, distinguishing himself in the battle of Mirablanca (28 March 1938), and was promoted to console (colonel) for war merit, returning to Italy with three silver medals and one bronze medal for military valor. Returning to Italy in 1939, he resumed command of the 1st University Legion and became a member of the Chamber of Fasces and Corporations. For his nearly twenty-year career in the National Fascist Party he was granted the Lictor Scarf.

After the Italy's entry in the Second World War Mittica was recalled into service with the MVSN and given command of the 45th Assault Blackshirt Legion "Alto Adige", landing in Durrës on 30 December 1940. Attached to the 11th Infantry Division Brennero, the legion participated in the Greco-Italian War, helping repel a Greek offensive on Tepelenë on 9–12 February 1941 and participating in the final advance into Greece in April. After the fall of Greece Mittica returned to Turin, where in August 1941 he took over the direction of the fortnightly magazine Vent'anni, replacing Ather Capelli. On 6 June 1942 he returned once again to the front, replacing Niccolò Nicchiarelli at the head of the 63rd Assault Blackshirt Legion "Tagliamento", fighting on the Eastern Front as part of the 8th Army, being awarded his third War Cross for military valor and fourth silver medal for military valor, as well as the German Iron Cross second class, for having repelled a Soviet offensive on the Don river in September 1942. In early December 1942, shortly before the beginning of Operation Little Saturn, Mittica left the command of "Tagliamento" and returned to Italy, arriving in Turin on 18 December. Here he became a lecturer in Military Culture at the Royal University of Turin on behalf of the Ministry of National Education. On 4 May 1943, Mussolini appointed him inspector of the PNF, reporting directly to the National Secretary of the Party, but on 25 July with the fall of Fascism, he lost all his posts.

After the armistice of Cassibile he joined the Italian Social Republic, becoming a member of the Republican Fascist Party of Turin. On 23 October 1943 he was promoted to console generale (brigadier general) and appointed Commander of the 1st Blackshirt Zone, later renamed 1st Republican National Guard Zone, as well as Inspector of the Republican National Guard for Piedmont. In early 1944 Benito Mussolini chose him as one of the judges in the Verona Trial against six members of the Grand Council of Fascism who, in the session of 25 July 1943, had voted a motion of no confidence against the Duce, causing his resignation and the fall of the regime. The trial lasted from 8 to 10 January 1944, and resulted in five of the six defendants being sentenced to death, the sentence being carried out on 11 January.

At 18:00 on 12 January 1944, while returning to Turin from Verona after the trial, Mittica's Fiat 1500 overturned and fell into a ditch near Greggio, along the Milan-Turin autoroute, due to a tire suddenly bursting; Mittica was killed instantly, while the driver and his adjutant were seriously injured. He was buried in the monumental cemetery of Turin.
