= Wake Up and Die =

- Directed by: Carlo Lizzani
- Screenplay by: Ugo Pirro
- Story by: Ugo Pirro; Carlo Lizzani
- Produced by: Joseph Fryd; Carlo Lizzani
- Starring: Robert Hoffmann; Lisa Gastoni; Gian Maria Volonté
- Cinematography: Armando Nannuzzi
- Edited by: Franco Fraticelli
- Music by: Ennio Morricone
- Production companies: Sanson Film; Castoro Film; Compagnie Internationale de Productions Cinématographiques
- Distributed by: Titanus; Cineriz (Italy); Metro-Goldwyn-Mayer (International)
- Release date: 6 April 1966
- Running time: 123 minutes
- Countries: Italy; France
- Language: Italian

Wake Up and Die (Italian: Svegliati e uccidi, French: Lutring... réveille-toi et meurs), also known as Wake Up and Kill and I Kill for Kicks, is a 1966 Italian-French crime-drama film directed by Carlo Lizzani, based on real life events of Luciano Lutring, an Italian criminal known as "the machine-gun soloist" ("il solista del mitra").

For her performance in this film, Lisa Gastoni was awarded a Silver Ribbon for Best Actress.

== Cast ==
- Robert Hoffmann as Luciano Lutring
- Lisa Gastoni as Yvonne Lutring
- Gian Maria Volonté as Inspector Moroni
- Claudio Camaso as Franco Magni
- Ottavio Fanfani as Inspector Julien
- Corrado Olmi as Bobino
