= Filippo Anfuso =

Italian politician (1901–1963)

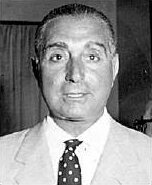
- Born: 1 January 1901; Catania, Sicily, Italy
- Died: 13 December 1963 (aged 62); Rome, Italy
- Occupations: Writer, diplomat, Fascist politician

Filippo Anfuso (1 January 1901 – 13 December 1963) was an Italian writer, diplomat and fascist politician.

== Biography ==
Anfuso was born in Catania. His writing career started with a volume of short stories and poetry that he published in 1917. Anfuso subsequently joined as a reporter with the poet Gabriele D'Annunzio in his attempt to seize Fiume for Italy (1919–1921). Anfuso returned to write for La Nazione and La Stampa, reporting from various foreign countries. A friend of Galeazzo Ciano, the two passed the exam for a career in diplomacy at the same time (in 1925).

Anfuso was appointed to the Italian Consulate in Munich (1927) and then to the missions in Hungary (1929), Germany (1931), the Republic of China (1932), and Greece (1934). In 1936, Anfuso was seconded to Francisco Franco's side during the Spanish Civil War and was decorated for merit. In 1938, after Galeazzo Ciano was appointed Minister of Foreign Affairs, Anfuso became Ministry head of staff.

In 1942, he became Minister in charge of the Italian Legation in Budapest. In 1943, after Mussolini had escaped to Northern Italy with Nazi German backing, Anfuso served as a diplomat for the newly-founded Italian Social Republic and represented it in Berlin. As ambassador in Berlin, he took care of the problems related to the presence in Germany of thousands of Italian servicemen deported after the 1943 armistice. His role in trying to protect some Jews persecuted by the Nazis was mentioned during the Eichmann trial held in Israel in 1961. In 1945, he replaced the deceased Serafino Mazzolini as undersecretary for the Republic's Foreign Affairs Ministry.

On 12 March 1945, the Rome High Court of Justice tried Anfuso and condemned him to death in absentia. He was found guilty of having co-operated with the Germans after the armistice on 8 September 1944, and was sentenced to be shot in the back.

After the war ended in Italy's defeat, Anfuso had made his way to France but was soon recognised and arrested there. He spent two years in prison, and after having been fully cleared by the French courts, he then exiled himself to Madrid.

Anfuso requested and received a new trial. In 1949, the Perugia Court of Assizes completely exonerated him.

In 1950, he returned to Italy, returned to journalism and published several books. Having adhered to the neo-fascist Italian Social Movement, he represented it in the Italian Chamber of Deputies. Anfuso died on 13 December 1963, aged 62, while he was speaking on the floor in the Italian Parliament in Rome.

== Family ==
On 13 April 1944, in Berlin, Germany, Anfuso married Kornélia "Nelli" Tasnady-Szüts (died 1995, Rome). In 1948, they had a daughter, Carmelina (died 2000, Rome, without issue), and, in 1951, a son, Francesco (died 1968, Abruzzi).

== Works ==
- 1949, Du Palais de Venise au Lac de Garde, Calmann-Levy, Paris
- 1950, Roma, Berlino, Salò (1936-1945), Garzanti, Milano, 1950
- 1951, L'innocenza del mezzogiorno e altri racconti, Garzanti
- 1951, Rom-Berlin im diplomatischen Spiegel, Pohl, München, Essen, Hamburg
- 1952, Die beiden Gefreiten - Ihr Spiel um Deutschland und Italien, Pohl, München
- 1957, Da Palazzo Venezia al lago di Garda 1936-1945, Cappelli, Bologna, 1957
- 1959, Da Jalta alla luna, Tipografia Tambone, Roma, 1959
- 1962, Fino a quando?, Edizioni del Borghese, Milano, 1962
- 1964, Discorsi ai sordi, Ediltaroma, Roma, 1964

== Sources ==
- Albanese, Matteo, & Pablo del Hierro (2016) Transnational Fascism in the Twentieth Century: Spain, Italy and the Global Neo-Fascist Network. (Bloomsbury Publishing). ASIN B01L92DJJG.
- Domenico, Roy Palmer (1991). Italian Fascists on Trial, 1943–1948. Chapel Hill: University of North Carolina. ISBN 0807820067.
