= Luciano Lutring =

Italian criminal (1937–2013)

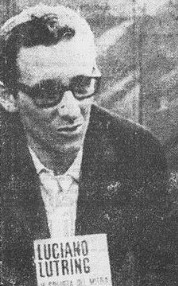
- Born: 30 December 1937; Milan, Italy
- Died: 13 May 2013 (aged 75); Verbania, Italy

Luciano Lutring (30 December 1937 – 13 May 2013) was an Italian criminal, author, and painter, known as "The Submachine Gun Soloist" (il solista del mitra), because he kept the weapon in a violin case. Born in Milan, Lutring carried out hundreds of robberies in France and Italy during the 1960s for an estimated 35 billion lire.

On 1 September 1965, during a robbery in Paris, Lutring was seriously wounded and remained in critical condition for two months. Sentenced to 22 years in prison, he served 12 years in prison in France, during which he began to write and paint, even exchanging letters with Sandro Pertini, then president of Italy's Chamber of Deputies. Later, in what is the only recorded case in history, he was pardoned by two presidents, Georges Pompidou of France and Italy's Giovanni Leone. In 1966, Carlo Lizzani directed a film based on his story, Wake Up and Die, with Robert Hoffmann and Gian Maria Volonté.
