= Giovanni Marinelli =

Italian Fascist politician (1879-1944)

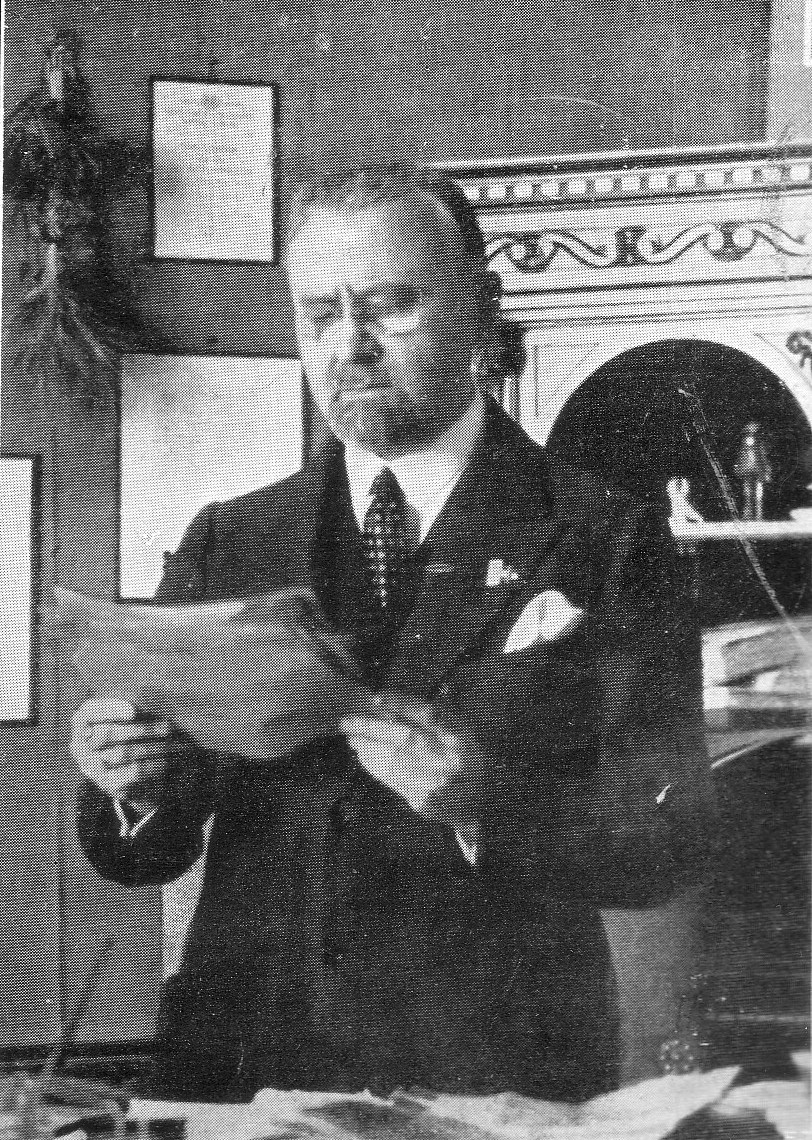

State Undersecretary for Communications
- In office 5 November 1939 – 13 February 1943

Personal details
- Born: 18 October 1879 Adria, Kingdom of Italy
- Died: 11 January 1944 (aged 64) Verona, Veneto, Italian Social Republic
- Cause of death: Execution by firing squad

Giovanni Marinelli (18 October 1879 – 11 January 1944) was an Italian Fascist political leader.

== Biography ==
Marinelli was born in Adria, Veneto.

A wealthy man, Marinelli contributed to Fascist success by financing the March on Rome. As secretary of the National Fascist Party (PNF), he created the Ceka, a secret police organization established on the model of the Soviet Cheka. The Ceka soon established itself as a terrorist squad, and was behind the assassination of Giacomo Matteotti, a prominent member of the opposition to the Fascist regime.

Tried as the instigator of the murder of Matteotti, he was arrested in June 1924. Thanks to the amnesty signed by Alfredo Rocco in July 1925, he was cleared of the charge in December 1925. He remained out of the spotlight during most of the next two decades of Fascist rule, and appears to have been involved in the crushing of internal opposition to Mussolini (including moves inside the PNF). He was elected to the Chamber of Deputies of the Kingdom of Italy in 1929 and in 1934, and from November 1939 to February 1943, he held the position of Undersecretary of State for Communications.

As a member of the Grand Council of Fascism, he joined the 25 July 1943 coup d'état carried out by Dino Grandi against Mussolini in an attempt to make the Kingdom of Italy switch sides from the Axis powers to the Allies during World War II. When Nazi Germany helped Mussolini re-establish his rule as leader of the Italian Social Republic in northern Italy, Marinelli was convicted of treason during the Verona trial of 1944, and executed by firing squad along with former minister of foreign affairs Galeazzo Ciano, Emilio De Bono, Carlo Pareschi, and Luciano Gottardi.

Tullio Cianetti, Marinelli's cellmate and the sole defendant spared the death penalty at the Verona trial (he got a 30-year sentence), later talked about Marinelli's final months. He described Marinelli in his last three months as an exhausted and dejected man. After Marinelli was sentenced to death, he appeared confused, and Ciano had to explain that they were going to be shot. As he departed his cell for his execution, Marinelli had to be supported by two officers.

== In media ==
In Florestano Vancini's 1973 film The Assassination of Matteotti, Orazio Stracuzzi plays Marinelli.

== Honours and awards ==
=== Italian ===
- Member of the Grand Council of Fascism of the National Fascist Party
- Knight Grand Cross of the Order of Saints Maurice and Lazarus (11 January 1940)
- Grand Officer of the Order of the Crown of Italy
- Commemorative Medal of the March on Rome (Gold)
- Honorary Corporal of the Voluntary Militia for National Security

=== Foreign ===
- Commander of the Order of Isabella the Catholic (Spain)
- Knight Grand Cross of the Order of Saint Agatha (San Marino)
