= Verona trial =

1944 show trial in the Italian Social Republic

Coordinates: 45.4400°N 10.9883°E

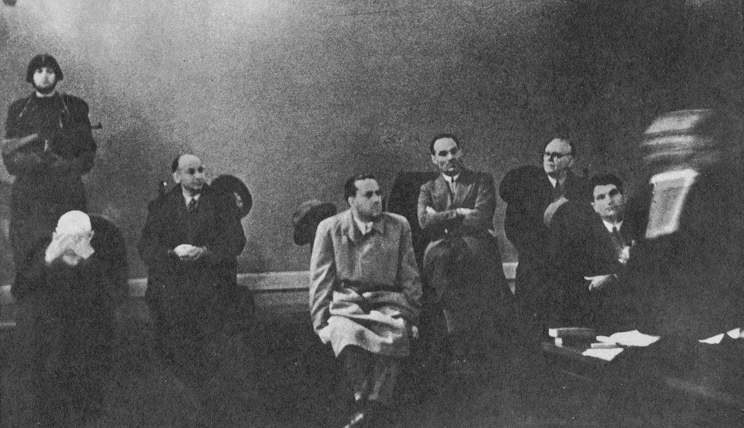
Galeazzo Ciano and others at the Verona trial

The Verona Trial (Italian: processo di Verona) was a show trial held in January 1944 in the Italian Social Republic (RSI) to punish the 19 members of the Grand Council of Fascism who had voted for Benito Mussolini's removal from power in the Kingdom of Italy. Six of them had been captured by Mussolini's forces and were present for the trial. Five of them were sentenced to death, whereas the sixth one received a 30-year sentence. The remaining members who were not captured were all sentenced to death in absentia.

== The event ==
Following the Allied invasion of Sicily, the Grand Council of Fascism voted, on 25 July 1943, with 19 against 8 votes and one abstention, to strip Mussolini of his function as Duce. When Mussolini refused to accept this decision and his dismissal by the king, he was arrested. In September 1943, German paratroopers rescued Mussolini from his captors via the Gran Sasso raid. He was then installed as the leader of the Italian Social Republic, effectively a puppet state of Nazi Germany.

At the urging of the German authorities, the RSI prosecuted those plotters they could find, six in number. The six men were Giovanni Marinelli; Carlo Pareschi; Luciano Gottardi; Galeazzo Ciano, the former Italian Minister of Foreign Affairs and Mussolini's son-in-law; the honoured Marshal of Italy Emilio De Bono; and Tullio Cianetti. All of the six captured defendants were found guilty, and all, except Cianetti, (who was granted general extenuating circumstances and was sentenced to 30 years) were sentenced to death. The other thirteen of the nineteen people who had voted against Mussolini were tried and sentenced to death in absentia. Among them was Dino Grandi, who had been responsible for the agenda of the meeting of 25 July 1943.

The trial took place between 8 and 10 January 1944. Vincenzo Cersosimo was appointed examining magistrate, with Blackshirt Colonel Aldo Vecchi as president of the court, and Andrea Fortunato as public prosecutor. The judges were Enrico Vezzalini, Franz Pagliani, Celso Riva, Blackshirt Generals Domenico Mittica and Renzo Montagna, Blackshirt Colonel Vito Casalinuovo, and Blackshirt Major Otello Gaddi. The execution of the five captured defendants who had been sentenced to death was performed as hastily as possible, by firing squad, on the morning of 11 January 1944. The condemned were tied to chairs and shot in the back by a Blackshirt firing squad led by Nicola Furlotti, under the supervision of SS officers who also photographed and filmed the event. Ciano twisted around in his chair to face his executioners.

== A contemporary comment ==
Victor Klemperer, a famous Dresden-based literature professor and diarist, who – although being Jewish – had survived the Hitler years, writing diary notices for almost every day, commented on the trial and the execution in a diary notice from 15 January 1944 as follows (translating the German original): "For me it is certain that the trial was a farce, that the execution was the work of the Germans, that Mussolini had almost nothing to do any longer with the whole affair – he is now almost invisible, the shadow of a puppet –, above all: that with this whole affair one wants to deter primarily internal opponents (Paulus, Seydlitz)."

== Film ==
A 1963 film by Carlo Lizzani, Il processo di Verona ("The Trial of Verona"), released internationally as The Verona Trial, depicts the trial and stresses the fate of Ciano.
