= Emilio De Bono =

Italian general and fascist activist (1866–1944)

Maresciallo d'Italia Emilio De Bono
- De Bono in 1937

Minister of the Colonies
- In office 12 September 1929 – 17 January 1935
- Monarch: Victor Emmanuel III
- Preceded by: Benito Mussolini (acting)
- Succeeded by: Benito Mussolini (acting)

Governor of Eritrea
- In office 18 January 1935 – 22 November 1935
- Monarch: Victor Emmanuel III
- Preceded by: Ottone Gabeli (acting)
- Succeeded by: Pietro Badoglio

Governor of Tripolitania
- In office 3 July 1925 – 18 December 1928
- Monarch: Victor Emmanuel III
- Preceded by: Giuseppe Volpi
- Succeeded by: Pietro Badoglio

Commandant-General of the Blackshirts
- In office 1 February 1923 – 31 October 1924
- Preceded by: Position established
- Succeeded by: Italo Balbo

Quadrumvir in the Grand Council of Fascism
- In office 15 December 1922 – 25 July 1943 Serving with Michele Bianchi (d. 1930), Italo Balbo (d. 1940), Cesare Maria De Vecchi

Member of the Senate of the Kingdom
- In office 1 March 1923 – 5 August 1943
- Appointed by: Victor Emmanuel III

Personal details
- Born: 19 March 1866 Cassano d'Adda, Lombardia, Italy
- Died: 11 January 1944 (aged 77) Verona, Veneto, Italian Social Republic
- Cause of death: Execution by firing squad
- Party: National Fascist Party
- Education: Scuola Militare Teulié; Military Academy of Modena
- Cabinet: Mussolini

Military service
- Allegiance: Kingdom of Italy
- Branch/service: Royal Italian Army
- Years of service: 1884–1920; 1935–1943
- Rank: Marshal of Italy
- Commands: "Trapani" Infantry Brigade; IX Army Corps; Blackshirts
- Battles/wars: Italo-Ethiopian War; Italo-Turkish War; World War I: Battle of Gorizia; Second Battle of the Piave River; Battle of Monte Grappa; Second Italo-Ethiopian War; World War II

Emilio De Bono (19 March 1866 – 11 January 1944) was an Italian general, fascist activist, marshal, war criminal, and member of the Fascist Grand Council (Gran Consiglio del Fascismo). De Bono fought in the Italo-Turkish War, the First World War and the Second Italo-Abyssinian War. He was one of the key figures behind Italy's anti-partisan policies in Libya, such as the use of poison gas and concentration camps.

After voting for the ousting of Benito Mussolini, De Bono and five others were arrested and tried for treason at the Verona trial. All of the men were found guilty, with De Bono and four others being executed by firing squad the following day.

== Early life and career ==
De Bono was born in Cassano d'Adda, a son of Giovanni de Bono and descendant of the Counts of Barlassina, and Elisa Bazzi. His family "suffered under the Austrian yoke". He entered the Royal Italian Army (Regio Esercito) in 1884 as a second lieutenant, fought in the Italo-Ethiopian War of 1887-1889, and had worked his way up to the General Staff by the start of the Italo-Turkish War in 1911. He was awarded the Knight's Cross of the Military Order of Savoy for his conduct during the war.

De Bono then fought in the First World War in which he distinguished himself against Austria-Hungary on the Karst Plateau in 1915 (as Colonel in the Bersaglieri corps), in the capture of Gorizia in 1916 (as commander of the "Trapani" Infantry Brigade), in the Second Battle of the Piave River in June 1918 and in the battle of Monte Grappa in October 1918 (as commander of the IX Army Corps). He was also the author of a popular patriotic song, Monte Grappa tu sei la mia patria ("Mount Grappa, you are my Fatherland"). During the war he was awarded three Silver Medals of Military Valour; in 1920, he was discharged with the rank of Major General.

== Fascist support ==
In the early 1920s, De Bono helped organise the National Fascist Party. In 1922, as one of the four Quadrumvirs, he organised and staged the March on Rome. The event signalled the start of the fascist regime in Italy.

After the march, De Bono served as Chief of Police and Commander of the Fascist Militia.

In 1925, De Bono was tried for his role in the 1924 death of the leftist politician Giacomo Matteotti. De Bono refused to implicate his superiors and was unexpectedly acquitted in 1925. Later that year, De Bono was appointed governor of Tripolitania, in Libya. De Bono was one of the key figures behind Italy's anti-partisan policies in Libya, such as poison gas and concentration camps, which resulted in the deaths of tens of thousands of civilians and have been described as genocidal.

In 1929, De Bono was appointed Minister of Colonial Affairs, also referred to as the Minister of Colonies. In 1932, King Victor Emmanuel III and De Bono visited Eritrea.

== Second Italo-Ethiopian War ==
In November 1932, at Benito Mussolini's request, De Bono wrote a plan for an invasion of Ethiopia. The plan outlined a traditional mode of penetration: a relatively small force would move gradually southward from Eritrea, establish strong bases and then advance against increasingly weak and disorganised opponents. The invasion that De Bono envisioned would be cheap, easy, safe and slow.

Mussolini separately involved the Army in planning, and over the next two years, the army developed its own massive campaign, which would involve five to six times the number of troops as required by De Bono. In 1934, Mussolini pulled the uncoordinated plans together into one that emphasised the military's idea of full-scale war.

In 1935, De Bono became Supreme Commander of the Italian operation against Ethiopia during the Second Italo-Ethiopian War. De Bono was appointed because Mussolini wanted the victory in Ethiopia to be not just an Italian victory but also a fascist victory, hence the appointment of a well-known fascist general. In addition, he was Commander-in-Chief of the forces invading from Italian-held Eritrea on what was known as the "northern front". De Bono had under his direct command a force of nine army divisions in three corps: the Italian I Corps, the Italian II Corps and the Eritrean Corps.

On 3 October, forces under De Bono's command crossed into Ethiopia from Eritrea. On 6 October, his forces took Adowa, officially avenging the humiliating 1896 Italian defeat. Soon afterwards, De Bono entered the historically significant city of Axum and rode a white horse. After those initial triumphs, however, De Bono's advance slowed.

On 8 November, the I Corps and the Eritrean Corps captured Mek'ele, which was to be the limit of Italian advances under De Bono. Increasing world pressure on Mussolini brought a need for fast glittering victories, and he was not prepared to hear of obstacles or delays.

On 16 November, De Bono was promoted to Marshal of Italy (Maresciallo d'Italia), but Mussolini grew ever more impatient with the invasion's slow progress. In December, De Bono was relieved of his command via State Telegram 13181 (Telegramma di Stato 13181), which stated that with the capture of Mek'ele five weeks earlier, his mission had been accomplished. His place was taken by Marshal Pietro Badoglio, and De Bono was appointed Inspector of Overseas Troops.

== Second World War ==
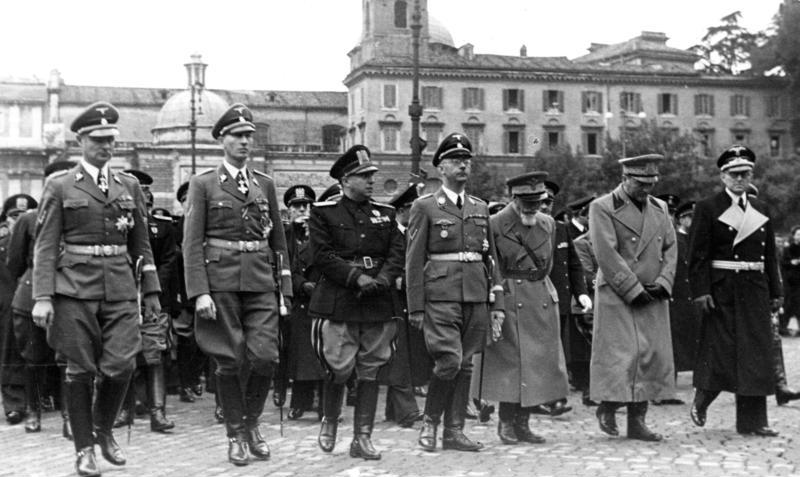
A photograph of De Bono taken in Rome on 21 November 1940. He is between Heinrich Himmler and Rodolfo Graziani and is easily identified by his signature beard. Reinhard Heydrich is to be seen, second from left.

In 1940, De Bono commanded a southern defense corps headquartered in Sicily and was opposed to the Italian entry into the Second World War; he filed a scathing report about the condition of the troops in Sicily, pointing out that the "mobile battalions" were not mobile at all, and harshly criticizing both the Maritime Artillery Militia and the Anti-Aircraft Defense Militia. However, he kept a low profile and in 1942 was appointed Minister of State.

On 24 and 25 July 1943, De Bono was one of the members of the Grand Council of Fascism who voted to oust Benito Mussolini when Dino Grandi, put a non-confidence motion to the vote of the Grand Council of Fascism. That led the King to get rid of the dictator, ordering his arrest and imprisonment.

Later in 1943, Mussolini was freed by Nazi Germany during the Gran Sasso raid and installed in Northern Italy as head of a new state, the Italian Social Republic (Repubblica Sociale Italiana, RSI). Mussolini had De Bono and others who voted against him arrested and tried for treason at Verona in what became known as the "Verona trial".

On 11 January 1944, the 77-year-old De Bono was executed by firing squad at Verona. He was shot along with Galeazzo Ciano, Luciano Gottardi, Giovanni Marinelli and Carlo Pareschi. Ciano was the Italian Minister of Foreign Affairs and Mussolini's son-in-law. Gottardi was the former president of the Fascist Confederation of Industrial Workers. Marinelli was the former chief of the Fascist militia, and Pareschi was the former Agriculture Minister. The only person on trial who escaped from capital punishment was Tullio Cianetti, the Minister of Corporations, who was sentenced to 30 years' imprisonment by the RSI judges. De Bono and the other condemned, tied to chairs as it was in use in Italy, suffered the humiliation of being shot in the back as traitors. After hearing the sentence, De Bono reportedly remarked, "You barely got me; I am seventy-eight", but later complained about being shot in the back, which he considered a stain to his honour as a soldier.

== Personal life ==
His siblings were Edmondo, Agostino, Constanza, Gerardo and Marella. He had no children.

== In popular culture ==
In Florestano Vancini's film The Assassination of Matteotti (1973), De Bono is played by Mario Maffei. In Joe Wright's miniseries Mussolini: Son of the Century (2025) based off the book of the same name, De Bono is played by Italian actor Maurizio Lombardi.

== Honours ==
- Knight of the Military Order of Savoy (28 December 1913)
- Commander of the Military Order of Savoy (9 September 1918)
- Grand Officer of the Military Order of Savoy (10 August 1928)
- Knight Grand Cross of the Military Order of Savoy (19 June 1936)
- Knight of the Order of Saints Maurice and Lazarus (3 April 1913)
- Officer of the Order of Saints Maurice and Lazarus (12 January 1919)
- Commander of the Order of Saints Maurice and Lazarus (30 December 1919)
- Grand Officer of the Order of Saints Maurice and Lazarus (8 April 1923)
- Knight of the Order of the Crown of Italy (7 November 1907)
- Officer of the Order of the Crown of Italy (13 September 1917)
- Commander of the Order of the Crown of Italy (13 September 1918)
- Grand Officer of the Order of the Crown of Italy (1 June 1919)
- Knight of the Supreme Order of the Most Holy Annunciation (3 October 1937)
- Knight Grand Cross with the Grand Cordon of the Colonial Order of the Star of Italy
- Knight Grand Cross of Magistral Grace of the Sovereign Military Order of Malta
- Silver Medal of Military Valor
- War Merit Cross
- Commemorative Medal of the African Campaigns
- Commemorative Medal for the Italo-Turkish War 1911–1912
- Commemorative Medal for the Italo-Austrian War 1915–1918 (two years of campaign)
- Commemorative Medal of the Unity of Italy 1848–1918
- Commemorative Medal of the March on Rome (28 October 1922)
- Cross for Length of Military Service (Gold Cross with Royal Crown for 40 years of service)
- Maurician Medal
- Honorary Corporal of the Voluntary Militia for National Security

== See also ==
- Second Italian-Abyssian War
- Tripoli Grand Prix
- Italian war crimes

== Sources ==
- Baer, George W. (1976). Test Case: Italy, Ethiopia, and the League of Nations. Stanford, California: Hoover Institute Press, Stanford University. ISBN 0-8179-6591-2.
- Barker, A.J. (1971). Rape of Ethiopia, 1936. New York: Ballantine Books. ISBN 978-0-345-02462-6.
- Bosworth, R.J.B. (2005). Mussolini's Italy: Life Under the Fascist Dictatorship, 1915-1945. New York: Penguin Books. ISBN 978-0-14-303856-6.
- Mockler, Anthony (2003). Haile Sellassie's war. New York: Olive Branch Press. ISBN 978-1-56656-473-1.
- Nicolle, David (1997). The Italian Invasion of Abyssinia 1935-1936. Westminster: Osprey. ISBN 978-1-85532-692-7.

Political offices
Preceded by Benito Mussolini interim	Italian Minister of the Colonies; 1929–1935	Succeeded by Benito Mussolini interim
Preceded by Giuseppe Volpi	Governor of Tripolitania; 1925–1929	Succeeded by Pietro Badoglio
Preceded by Ottone Gabelli	Governor of Eritrea; 1935	Succeeded by Pietro Badoglio
