= Carlo Pareschi =

Italian politician (1898–1944)

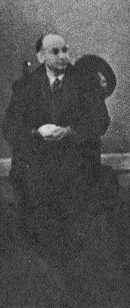

Minister of Agriculture of the Kingdom of Italy
- In office 26 December 1941 – 25 July 1943
- Prime Minister: Benito Mussolini
- Preceded by: Giuseppe Tassinari
- Succeeded by: Alessandro Brizi

Member of the Chamber of Fasces and Corporations
- In office 23 March 1939 – 5 August 1943

Personal details
- Born: 19 August 1898 Poggio Renatico, Kingdom of Italy
- Died: 11 January 1944 (aged 45) Verona, Veneto, Italian Social Republic
- Cause of death: Execution by firing squad
- Party: National Fascist Party

Military service
- Allegiance: Kingdom of Italy
- Branch/service: Royal Italian Army
- Years of service: 1917-1918, 1941
- Rank: Captain
- Battles/wars: World War I; World War II; North African campaign
- Awards: Bronze Medal of Military Valour

Carlo Pareschi (19 August 1898 – 11 January 1944) was an Italian Fascist politician, member of the Grand Council of Fascism and minister of agriculture of the Kingdom of Italy from 1941 to 1943.

== Biography ==
A renowned agronomist, he fought in World War I as lieutenant in the 6th Heavy Artillery Regiment, earning a Bronze Medal of Military Valour. After the war, he joined the Fascist Party in the early 1920s. From 1928 to 1932 he was general secretary of the Fascist Confederation of Farmers, and in 1933 he became a member of the Grand Council of Fascism, although he did not personally attend its sessions during the 1930s. In 1941, during World War II, he volunteered for the front and was sent to North Africa with the rank of artillery Captain, but was recalled after a few months to be appointed president of the Fascist Confederation of Farmers and then Minister of Agriculture.

He attended the Grand Council of Fascism for the first time on 25 July 1943, when he was among those who voted in favor of the motion of no confidence against Benito Mussolini, having been persuaded to do so by Dino Grandi. To those who pointed out that the approval of Grandi's order of the day would result in the resignation of the Duce, Pareschi replied "these are merely words, nothing will ever change, as usual". Even after the arrest of Benito Mussolini, considering himself a "technician" lent almost unwillingly to politics, he did not foresee desire for revenge of the Fascists and remained in Rome, where in early October 1943, after the Armistice of Cassibile and the German takeover, he was arrested by the authorities of the newly established Italian Social Republic.

Tried for treason at the Verona Trial, he was sentenced to death and executed by firing squad on 11 January 1944, along with Galeazzo Ciano, Emilio De Bono, Luciano Gottardi and Giovanni Marinelli.
