= Luciano Gottardi =

Italian politician (1899–1944)

Member of the Chamber of Fasces and Corporations
- In office 23 March 1939 – 5 August 1943
- President of the Fascist Confederation of Industrial Workers
- In office 29 April 1943 – 16 August 1943
- Preceded by: Giuseppe Landi
- Succeeded by: Bruno Buozzi

Personal details
- Born: 18 February 1899 Ferrara, Kingdom of Italy
- Died: 11 January 1944 (aged 44) Verona, Veneto, Italian Social Republic
- Cause of death: Execution by firing squad
- Party: National Fascist Party

Military service
- Allegiance: Kingdom of Italy
- Branch/service: Royal Italian Army
- Battles/wars: World War I

Luciano Gottardi (18 February 1899 – 11 January 1944) was an Italian Fascist politician and trade unionist.

== Biography ==
The son of a small farmer, he participated in the First World War initially as a private in the telegraph troops of the Royal Italian Army and later as a cavalry second lieutenant. After the war he enrolled in the faculty of economic and commercial sciences of the University of Trieste, but was unable to complete his studies. He joined the Fascist movement in 1920, participating in Trieste in the protests against the Italian Army’s intervention against the Regency of Carnaro (during which he was slightly wounded and arrested), and later in the march on Rome. After the establishment of the Fascist regime, during the 1920s and 1930s, he held a number of offices within Fascist trade unions in Trieste, Bari, Rome, Como, Florence, Treviso and Caltanissetta. This sometimes brought him into conflict with the employers, which he accused of being excessively greedy and opportunistic; a report by an informant of the Fascist political police described him as "an old fascist of faith. Too passionate. He has trouble in adapting to collaboration with employers. Fascist syndicalism, rather than directing him towards corporatism, tends to bring him to class struggle. Morally alright. Good orator".

In 1939 he became a member of the Chamber of Fasces and Corporations, and in 1942 he was appointed president of the Carbonsarda mining company, but he resigned due to conflicts with the Azienda Carboni Italiani, the state company that controlled the coal mining industry in Italy. In May 1943 he became president of the Confederation of Industrial Workers, which gave him a seat by right in the Grand Council of Fascism. He thus participated in the meeting of the Grand Council on 25 July 1943, voting in favor of the order of the day that resulted in the downfall of the regime (he would later have motivated this choice by explaining that he intended "to relieve the Duce of many responsibilities" and that he "had the clear impression that there was a split between the Party, the people, and the army, and that the morale of the nation was shaken. Since it emerged from the Duce's own account at the Grand Council that the army did not want to fight, I thought that, if the Crown took a direct part in the fortunes of the war, perhaps the army would be able to recover"). On 16 August 1943 he was dismissed from his post at the head of the Confederation of Industrial Workers by the Badoglio government.

After the armistice of Cassibile, in September 1943, he remained in Rome and asked to be able to join the Republican Fascist Party, accompanying the request with a long letter to secretary Alessandro Pavolini, in which he claimed to have repented and recalled his fascist merits. Despite his belated "repentance", in early October 1943 he was arrested by the Italian Social Republic and locked up in Regina Coeli prison - the first of the "traitors of 25 July" to be captured. He was later transferred to the Padua prison, tried and sentenced to death for treason at the Verona trial together with Galeazzo Ciano, Emilio De Bono, Carlo Pareschi and Giovanni Marinelli; together with them he was executed by firing squad in Verona in the morning of 11 January 1944. Throughout the trial and in front of the firing squad, Gottardi maintained a serene and courageous demeanor; just before the order to fire was given, he rose from the chair he had been tied to, gave the Fascist salute and shouted, "Long live the Duce, long live Italy!".
