= Tullio Cianetti =

Italian politician (1899–1976)

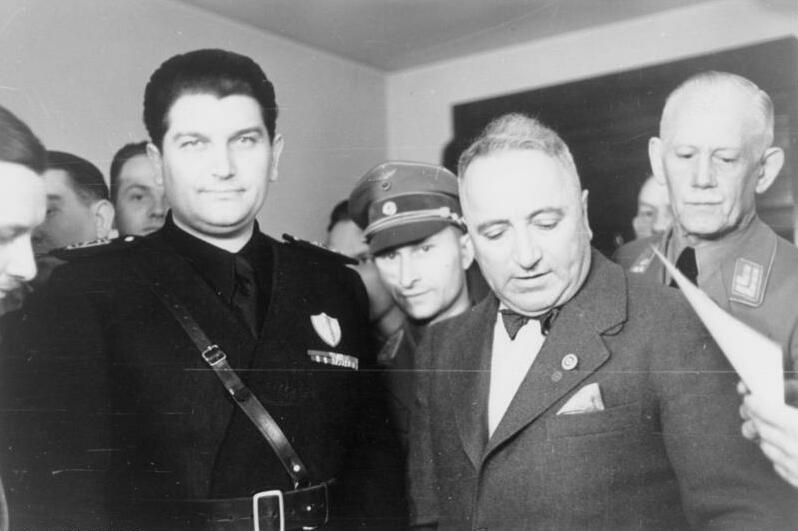
Tullio Cianetti (left) with Robert Ley

Tullio Cianetti (20 August 1899, in Assisi – 8 April 1976, in Maputo, Mozambique) was an Italian fascist politician who was well known for his work with the trade unions.

The son of a farmer, Cianetti was conscripted in 1917 and served as a lieutenant in the Italian Army until 1921. Returning to Assisi, he worked as a teacher, whilst also helping to found the fascio in the town, becoming secretary in 1922. He was moved to Terni to organise the syndicate before being promoted to captain and appointed regional secretary for syndicates in Umbria in 1924. The same year he stepped away from fascism for a time following the death of Giacomo Matteotti and suspicion began to arise that he was too left-wing. However, by 1925 he had returned as secretary of syndicates in Syracuse, before being promoted to major and going on to hold similar roles in Carrara, Messina, Matera, and Treviso.

In 1931 he was promoted to colonel and made secretary of the national federation of miners and quarrymen and in this role agitated for higher wages. However, despite his tendency to sometimes clash with the government he continued to rise in influence, serving as secretary of the Fascist Confederation of Industrial Workers' syndicates and Vice-President of the Institute of Social Assurance. As head of the Confederation, Cianetti concluded a deal with Robert Ley in 1937 to allow Italian workers to go to Nazi Germany for employment. Such was the regard with which he was held by the leaders of the German Labour Front that the main Volkswagen factory even had a leisure complex called Cianetti Hall in his honour.

Cianetti's rise continued when he was promoted to general and appointed to the Fascist Grand Council in November 1934, and in 1939 was made undersecretary of corporations. He reached his zenith in April 1943 when he was promoted to marshal and became Minister of Corporations. However his dissident tendencies continued as Cianetti voted in favour of Dino Grandi's motion to remove Mussolini, after Grandi had told him that all he was doing was arranging for the king to share the burden of government with Mussolini. Cianetti wrote to Il Duce to apologise immediately afterwards.

Cianetti was one of the fascists tried along with Galeazzo Ciano in the Verona trial of 8–10 January 1944. However, of all the defendants, he was the only one granted general extenuating circumstances and was therefore to be spared execution, instead being sentenced to 30 years in prison. The letter of apology he had written to Mussolini saved him from execution. Following the liberation, he was released and went into exile in Portuguese Mozambique.

== See also ==
- António Júlio de Castro Fernandes
