= Mussolini family =

Italian political family

- Bruno Mussolini (left), with his father, Benito Mussolini and brother Vittorio Mussolini (right), on the cover of Time
- Country: Kingdom of Italy
- Founder: Alessandro Mussolini

The Mussolini family is a well-known family in Italy. The most prominent member was Benito Mussolini, the fascist Prime Minister of Italy from 1922 to 1943.

== Family ==
- Alessandro Mussolini (1854–1910), blacksmith, socialist, the father of Benito Mussolini, and the father-in-law of Rachele Mussolini
- Rosa Maltoni Mussolini (1858–1905), mother of Benito Mussolini and the mother-in-law of Rachele Mussolini, married to Alessandro Mussolini
  - Benito Mussolini (1883–1945)
  - Rachele Mussolini (1890–1979), wife of Benito Mussolini, sister-in-law of Arnaldo and Edvige Mussolini
    - Edda Mussolini (1910–1995), daughter of Benito Mussolini, married to Galeazzo Ciano, 2nd Count of Cortellazzo and Buccari
      - Fabrizio Ciano, 3rd Count of Cortellazzo and Buccari (1931–2008), memoirist, grandson of Benito Mussolini, last Count of Cortellazzo and Buccari
    - Vittorio Mussolini (1916–1997), film critic and producer, son of Benito Mussolini
      - Caio Giulio Cesare Mussolini (born 1968), great-grandson of Benito Mussolini, grandson of Vittorio, stood for the 2019 European Parliament election in Italy as a member of the right-wing Brothers of Italy political party
    - Bruno Mussolini (1918–1941), pilot in the Regia Aeronautica, son of Benito Mussolini
    - Romano Mussolini (1927–2006), musician and painter, son of Benito Mussolini, married Maria Scicolone, who is the sister of Sophia Loren
      - Alessandra Mussolini (born 1962), politician, singer, and television personality, granddaughter of Benito Mussolini
        - Romano Floriani Mussolini (born 2003), footballer, great-grandson of Benito Mussolini
      - Rachele Mussolini (born 1974), councillor of the city of Rome, granddaughter of Benito Mussolini
    - Anna Maria Mussolini (1929–1968), an Italian radio presenter, fifth child of Benito Mussolini
  - Arnaldo Mussolini (1885–1931), journalist and politician, younger brother of Benito Mussolini, brother-in-law of Rachele Mussolini
  - Edvige Mussolini (1888–1952), younger sister of Arnaldo and Benito, and sister-in-law of Rachele Mussolini

== See also ==
- Mussolinia (disambiguation)
- Italian fascism
