= Bruno Mussolini =

Son of Benito Mussolini (1918–1941)

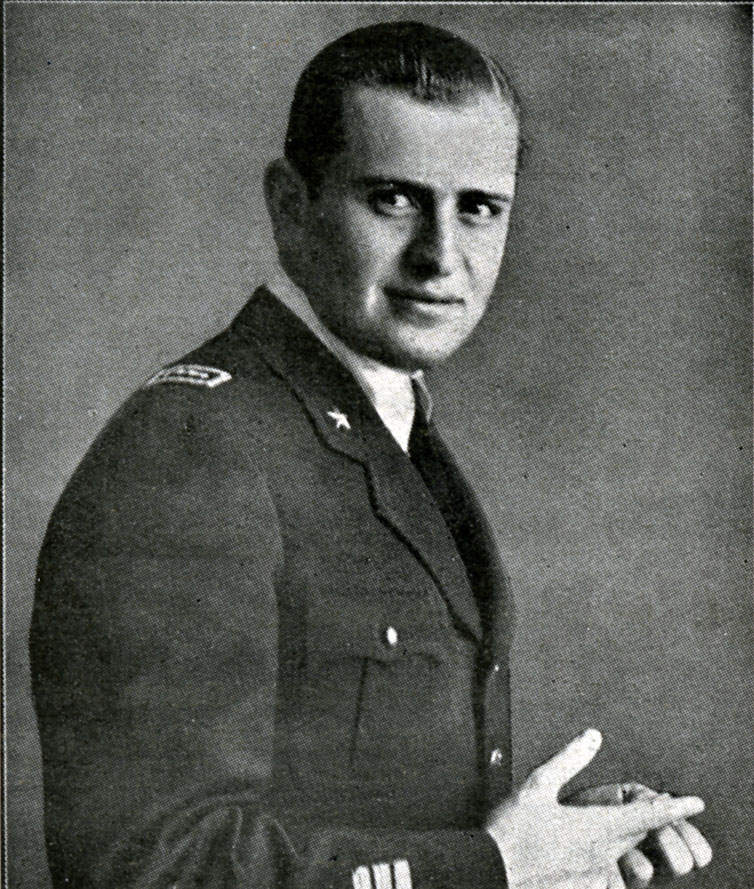
- Mussolini in 1941
- Born: 22 April 1918; Milan, Kingdom of Italy
- Died: 7 August 1941 (aged 23); Pisa, Kingdom of Italy
- Cause of death: Flying accident
- Height: 1.69 m (5 ft 7 in)
- Spouse: Gina Ruberti
- Parents: Benito Mussolini (father); Rachele Guidi (mother)
- Relatives: Vittorio Mussolini (brother); Edda Mussolini (sister); Romano Mussolini (brother); Arnaldo Mussolini (uncle); Alessandro Mussolini (paternal grandfather); Rosa Mussolini (paternal grandmother)
- Military career
- Allegiance: Kingdom of Italy
- Branch: Regia Aeronautica
- Service years: 1935–1941
- Rank: Captain
- Conflicts: Second Italo-Ethiopian War; Spanish Civil War; World War II

Bruno Mussolini (22 April 1918 – 7 August 1941) was the son of Prime Minister of Italy Benito Mussolini and Mussolini's second wife Rachele, the nephew of Arnaldo Mussolini, and also the grandson of Alessandro Mussolini and Rosa Mussolini. He was an experienced pilot who died in a flying accident.

== Biography ==
Bruno Mussolini was born in Milan in Lombardy. His father, Benito Mussolini, was the editor of the newspaper Il Popolo d'Italia ("The People of Italy") before Bruno's birth and, on 22 April 1918, was away for the day in Genoa. Mussolini indicated to his wife that he did not want her to give birth before his return. In his words: "I don't want to be the last to be told again, as I was with Vittorio." That evening, the manager of the newspaper greeted Mussolini at the station with a broad grin and the words: "It's a boy."

=== Childhood ===
In 1919, Bruno Mussolini caught diphtheria and his parents feared he would never recover. Soon after the doctors pronounced him out of danger, he suffered from a bronchial complaint. By this time, one-year-old Bruno's weight had dropped to about 15 pounds (6.8 kg).

As a young student, 9-year-old Bruno adeptly, if not correctly, answered a schoolteacher's question about grammar. An examiner is reported to have said: "Now Bruno, tell me in what person one cannot command" (meaning the first-person). In response, Bruno tactfully responded: "There are two persons one cannot command, the King and my father."

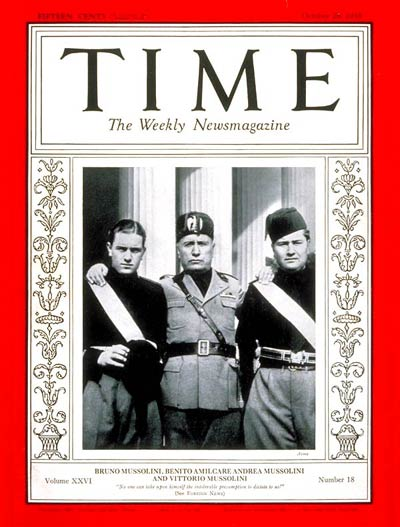
Bruno (left), with father and brother Vittorio, on the cover of Time, 28 October 1935

At the age of 12, Bruno took after his father and tackled journalism. He and his older brother Vittorio published a weekly periodical called La Penna del Ragazzi ("The Boys' Pen").

Bruno grew to like boxing, women, and cars. In 1935, at the age of 17, Bruno became Italy's youngest pilot.

=== Marriage ===
On 7 November 1938, Bruno married Gina Ruberti (Note: Also spelled Gena Ruberti.) in Rome. (Note: According to the British Pathé short, "Bruno Mussolini Weds". The groom's father escorted the bride.) His wife was the daughter of the head of the Ministry of Education's Contemporary Art Bureau. On 18 March 1940 in Rome, Bruno and his wife had their first child, a daughter named Marina.

=== Pilot ===
In 1935, Bruno Mussolini joined the Royal Italian Air Force (Regia Aeronautica Italiana) and became a pilot. He flew for the Regia Aeronautica during the Second Italo-Ethiopian War. In September, before the Kingdom of Italy invaded the Ethiopian Empire, Air Sergeant Bruno Mussolini, 17, Air Second Lieutenant Vittorio Mussolini, 18, and Air Captain Count Nobile Galeazzo Ciano, 32, sailed from Naples to Africa aboard the MS Saturnia. Bruno later wrote newspaper articles describing his exploits in the war, saying that the Ethiopians were "bursting open like a rose," and that "after the bomb racks were emptied I began throwing bombs by hand...it was most amusing." After Ethiopia, Bruno also participated in the Spanish Civil War and World War II. Unlike his brother Vittorio, Bruno was considered to be a serious pilot. In addition to participating in various conflicts, Bruno was involved in setting flight airspeed records in a 1938 flight to Brazil.

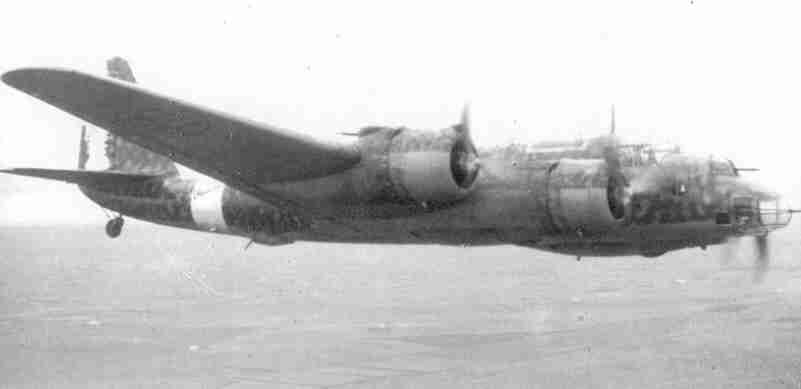
Piaggio P.108

=== Death ===
On 7 August 1941, the 23-year-old Mussolini, commander of the 274a Squadriglia (274th Squadron), was flying in one of the prototypes of the "secret" Piaggio P.108B bomber, MM22003, near the San Giusto Airport in Pisa, when he crashed into a house. The cockpit section was separated from the rest of the aircraft, and Bruno Mussolini died of his injuries. Although the aircraft did not catch fire, it was totally destroyed in the impact. Five members of the crew were injured, and three died, including Bruno. Benito Mussolini rushed to the Santa Chiara Hospital to be at the side of his dead son.

Bruno's death prompted his father to compose a booklet entitled "I Talk With Bruno" (Parlo con Bruno). The booklet implied timeless intimacy between the two and mixed Fascist, Catholic, and familial piety.

== Television ==
Robert Downey, Jr. portrayed Bruno Mussolini in the TV mini-series Mussolini: The Untold Story in 1985.

== See also ==
- Benito Albino Mussolini – Bruno Mussolini's older half brother
- Vittorio Mussolini – Bruno Mussolini's older brother
- Romano Mussolini – Bruno Mussolini's younger brother
- Anna Maria Mussolini – Bruno Mussolini's younger sister
- István Horthy – son of Hungarian Regent Admiral Miklós Horthy, also died in an aircraft-related incident
- Edda Mussolini - Bruno Mussolini's older sister

== Sources ==
- Bignozzi, Giorgio. "The Italian 'Fortress' (part 1)." Air International Vol. 31 No. 6, December 1986. pp. 298–305, (part 2). Air International Vol. 32 No. 1, January 1987. pp. 29–31, 47–49.
- Bosworth, R. J. B. (2005). Mussolini's Italy: Life Under the Fascist Dictatorship, 1915–1945. New York: Penguin Press. pp. 692. ISBN 1-59420-078-5.
- Emiliani, Angelo (April 1998). "'Mon duel avec le fils du Duce', ou l'histoire d'un bluff!" [My Duel with the Son of the Duce, or the Story of a Bluff!]. Avions: Toute l'aéronautique et son histoire (in French) (64): 14–16. ISSN 1243-8650.
- Mussolini, Rachele (1974). Mussolini: An Intimate Biography by His Widow (as told to Albert Zarca). New York: William Morrow. pp. 291. ISBN 0-688-00266-8.
