= Mussolini: The Untold Story =

- Directed by: William A. Graham
- Starring: George C. Scott; Lee Grant; Mary Elizabeth Mastrantonio; Gabriel Byrne; Raul Julia; Virginia Madsen; Robert Downey Jr.
- Music by: Laurence Rosenthal
- Countries of origin: United Kingdom; United States

Production
- Executive producer: Bernard Sofronski
- Running time: 6 h 50 m

Original release
- Release: 24 November – 26 November 1985

Mussolini: The Untold Story is a television biographical miniseries drama that aired on November 24–26, 1985. The series followed the rise, rule, and downfall of the Italian dictator Benito Mussolini (played by American actor George C. Scott).

Mussolini's private life features prominently in the series, including his long-term romance with his mistress Clara Petacci (played by Virginia Madsen).

The series begins in 1922, as Mussolini gathers his power through the use of his Black Shirt militia. Promoting himself as Julius Caesar reincarnate, Il Duce gains a national fervor that peaks after the Italian invasion of Abyssinia (Ethiopia) in 1935. In 1938, Mussolini attempts to promote peace at the Munich Conference. Nonetheless, he aligns himself with Adolf Hitler. Mussolini draws Italy into World War II, which leads to his country's decline, Mussolini's fall from power, and the eventual roadside execution of Mussolini and Petacci.

The series was nominated for two Primetime Emmy Awards.

== Premise ==
The rise and fall of the Italian fascist dictator, Benito Mussolini.

== Cast ==
- George C. Scott as Benito Mussolini
- David Suchet as Dino Grandi
- Lee Grant as Rachele Mussolini
- Mary Elizabeth Mastrantonio as Edda Mussolini-Ciano
- Raul Julia as Count Galeazzo Ciano
- Tracy-Louise Ward as Countess Maria Ciano
- Virginia Madsen as Claretta Petacci
- Robert Downey Jr. as Bruno Mussolini
  - Paul Kehagias as Young Bruno Mussolini
- Gabriel Byrne as Vittorio Mussolini
  - Spencer Chandler as Young Vittorio Mussolini
- Kenneth Colley as King Victor Emmanuel III
- Gunnar Möller as Adolf Hitler
- Gina Bellman as Gena Ruberti
- Godfrey James as Marshal Pietro Badoglio
- Michael Aldridge as Giacomo Matteotti
- George Coulouris as Emilio De Bono
- Vernon Dobtcheff as Sebastiani
- Constantine Gregory as Baron Russo
- Paul Herzberg as Major Spogler
- Wolf Kahler as Skorzeny
- Richard Kane as Joachim von Ribbentrop
- Anne-Louise Lambert as Orsala
- Annabel Leventon as Mrs Petacci
- Michael MacKenzie as Amalfi
- Philip Madoc as Buchini
- Stephen Marshall as Romano
- Tony Vogel as Tarabella
- Milton Johns as German Ambassador
- Vladan Živković as Carlo Scorza

== Production ==
The dictator's son Vittorio advised writer-producer Stirling Silliphant on the screenplay, which later led to accusations of bias. In a promotional interview, Silliphant said that his research "really got interesting when we went off to Rome and met his eldest surviving son, Vittorio. For about 10 days, we asked him hundreds of questions. He was delightful, charming, very sophisticated and still a spokesman for his father". Silliphant sent a finished script to Vittorio (himself a sometime screenwriter and film critic) and travelled to meet him on Ischia:

We spent an anxious three or four days there waiting and then we met again. That was, I think, the most difficult time in my life as a writer. He is really brilliant in terms of analysing scenes and he would suggest, very acutely, very cleverly, very small alterations that would have the effect of showing his father more favourably. We really had to watch him.

The series was shot in Rome and Yugoslavia, at the same time as the Italian shoot of HBO's Mussolini and I, which broadcast earlier in the same year.

== Reception ==
In September 1985, John J. O'Connor had concluded a lukewarm review for The New York Times of HBO's rival show: "The Decline and Fall of Il Duce serves as a kind of teasing introduction to what perhaps will be more illuminating television efforts to deal with one of this century's more confounding figures. Later this season, Mussolini is to be portrayed by George C. Scott." When the NBC production appeared in November, O'Connor was disappointed, noting again an emphasis on the dictator's private life at the expense of his political significance ("this is history as it might be reworked for Dynasty"). Pointing out Vittorio Mussolini's involvement, he felt the series painted too sympathetic a portrait, and summed up: "That, it's to be hoped, ends television's preoccupation with Mussolini and global politics for this season."

Howard Rosenberg in The Los Angeles Times shared many of O'Connor's misgivings. Though positive about the series's technical aspects ("elegantly staged, wonderfully lit and beautifully shot"), he disliked the emphasis on private life: "The Untold Story reduces turbulent history to a string of romances that add up to Dynasty, Italian style." He also felt that Scott's Mussolini was "portrayed far too sympathetically. Accompanied by Godfatherly music, he is defined largely as a tragic and even somewhat heroic figure who sacrifices himself rather than endanger others".

When the series screened on BBC One in four parts in 1987, The Times wrote, "As drama, this is no better or worse than the usual American mini-series, but Scott is one of those rare actors who can transcend his material and take over the screen." A preview for The Sunday Telegraph was contemptuous: "The unique George C. Scott, the Olivier of thuggish monomaniacs, does his thing as Benito with lots of almost-Italian accents. The final punishment for that obsessive nationalist, a four-part series with about two Italian actors in it." A review for The Daily Telegraph published a few days later felt that the series started impressively ("George C. Scott, a colossus among contemporary screen actors by anyone's reasonable standards, postured and glowered and played Godfather to family, friends and enemies to considerable effect") but deteriorated into soap opera as it continued. Nancy Banks-Smith in The Guardian wrote: "It seems respectably researched though with a soft, not to say squashy, centre about family life with the Mussolinis." By contrast, Andrew Graham-Dixon in The Independent was entirely negative ("The crude set-pieces that Mr Scott had to perform added up to something like a crash course in Italian Fascism devised for five-year-olds") as was Patrick Stoddart in The Sunday Times ("not even the father of fascism deserved Mussolini: The Untold Story... this unspeakable story should have remained untold").

== Awards ==
The series was nominated for two Emmy Awards, for editing and sound mixing.

== Accuracy ==
Mussolini's biographer, the Oxford historian Denis Mack Smith, detailed his objections to the series in an article for The Daily Telegraph. He felt that it glamorised Mussolini both in his private and his political life:

Though the film does not say so, he was a bad husband and bad father who despised any kind of friendship and even when at home preferred to eat by himself... Mussolini despised women and consistently treated them with petty brutality, but to reveal that side of him might make unattractive viewing... Nor is there anything here of the ruthless man who ordered the execution of prisoners and the "extermination" by poison gas of whole villages in Africa...

Mack Smith wrote that Petacci was given undue prominence in the story by the removal of the dictator's other mistresses. Regarding Scott's performance, he stated that in the scenes of Mussolini's public speeches the actor reproduced his mannerisms exactly, but on other occasions did not bother, and was too old considering that, in the period depicted, Mussolini became Italy's youngest prime minister. Pointing out that Scott's make-up omitted the protuberant wart that Mussolini made sure was not visible in photographs, (Note: Scott wore a false nose as part of his make-up.) Mack Smith concluded that the series showed him according to his own self-image: "a decent, humane, affectionate person that he would have dearly liked the outside world to believe in".
