= Propaganda in Fascist Italy =

Propaganda in Fascist Italy was used by the National Fascist Party in the years leading up to and during Benito Mussolini's leadership of the Kingdom of Italy during the Fascist era and was a crucial instrument for acquiring and maintaining power and the implementation of Fascist policies.

== History ==
=== Early Fascist Party (1919–1922) ===
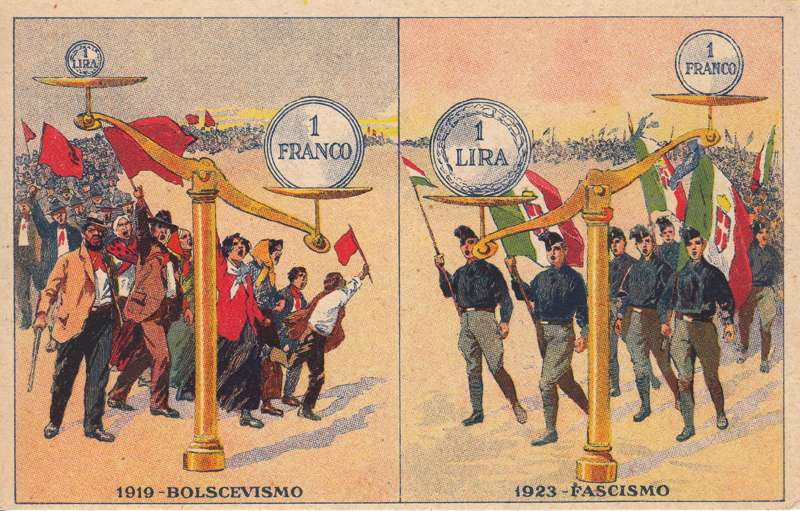
An anti-socialist poster published by the National Fascist Party (1924)

From the formation of the Italian Fasces of Combat ("Fasci Italiani di Combattimento") in 1919, the Fascists made heavy use of propaganda, including pageantry and rhetoric, to inspire the nation into the unity that would obey. The party's main propaganda tool was Il Popolo d'Italia ("The People of Italy"), a pro-war political newspaper founded and directed by Benito Mussolini himself in 1914, which advocated for militarism, Italian irredentism, and the Italian intervention in the First World War.

During those years, Fascist propaganda was mostly targeted at opposing the Italian Socialist Party (PSI), the largest political movement in the country and the Italian Fascists' main antagonist to power. The PSI was accused of being a sock puppet of the Communist Party of the Soviet Union and was often labelled as a "Russian army". Those sentiments were often shared by the Italian liberal establishment, which condemned Fascist violence but was more afraid of a Bolshevik Revolution.

In addition to attacking the Italian socialists through the pro-war Fascist newspaper Il Popolo d'Italia ("The People of Italy"), Mussolini often also attacked the liberal establishment of the Kingdom of Italy, which he regarded as responsible for the so-called "mutilated victory", a term used to describe Italian nationalists' dissatisfaction on the territorial rewards at the end of the Great War.

=== In power (1922–1943) ===
Once Mussolini came in power, all propaganda efforts were grouped together under the press office;, and propaganda efforts were slowly organized until a Ministry of Popular Culture was created in 1937. A special propaganda ministry was created in 1935 and claimed that its purpose was to tell the truth about Fascism, refute the lies of its enemies and clear up ambiguities that were only to be expected in so large and dynamic a movement.

== Themes ==
=== Personality cult ===
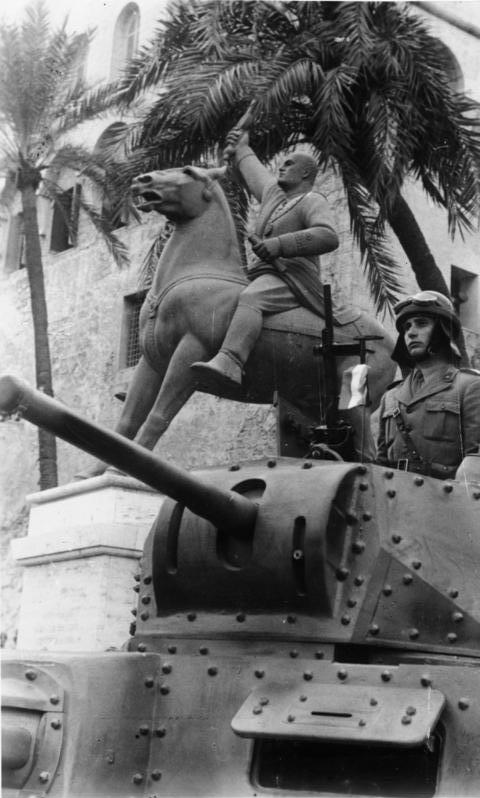
Parade Of Italian forces alongside an equestrian statue of Mussolini during the North African campaign in Tripoli, Italian-occupied Libya (Bundesarchiv Bild, March 1941)

Benito Mussolini was the central figure of Italian Fascism and portrayed as such. The personality cult of Mussolini was in many respects the unifying force of the Fascist regime by acting as a common denominator of various political groups and social classes in the National Fascist Party and Italian society. The personality cult of Mussolini helped reconcile Italian citizens with the Fascist regime despite annoyance with local officials. A basic slogan in Fascist Italy proclaimed that Mussolini was "always right" (Italian: Il Duce ha sempre ragione). Endless publicity revolved about Mussolini with newspapers being instructed on exactly what to report about him.

He was generally portrayed in a macho manner, but he could also appear as a Renaissance man or as a military, family, or even common man. That reflected his presentation as a universal man, capable of all subjects. A light was left on in his office long after he was asleep as part of propaganda to present him as an insomniac because of his supposed nature of being driven to work. Mussolini, as a practitioner of various sports such as fencing, auto racing, skiing, horse riding, lion taming, and swimming, was promoted to create an image of a valiant and fearless hero. Mussolini's prestige as a hero aviator in the manner of Charles Lindbergh was especially important, as for Italian Fascism the aeroplane embodied qualities such as dynamism, energy, and courage. Mussolini himself oversaw the photographs that could appear and rejected some, such as because he was not sufficiently prominent in a group.

Mussolini's youthfulness (when he took office, he became the youngest prime minister in Italian history), and his virile and energetic appearance were promoted. In Fascist symbolism, youth constituted a metaphor for action and vitality, which emphasizsed the nature of Italian fascism as a revolutionary ideology in contrast to the stasis of liberal democracy. The official Italian Fascist hymn, Giovinezza ("Youth"), linked the concepts of youth, the rebirth of the nation, and the reign of Mussolini into symbolic unity. The publicising of Mussolini's birthdays and illnesses were banned for journalists to give an impression of him not aging. The erotic aspect of this personality cult was also prominent since although Mussolini was portrayed as a respectable family man, state propaganda did meanwhile little to counter the idea that he had sexual magnetism to women and was promiscuous.

Legends of Mussolini defying death during the First World War and surviving assassination attempts were circulated to give the dictator a mythical and immortal aura. It was stated that Mussolini's body had been pierced by shrapnel just as Saint Sebastian had been pierced by arrows, the difference being that Mussolini had survived his ordeal. He was also compared to Saint Francis of Assisi, who had, like Mussolini, "suffered and sacrificed himself for others".

Mussolini's humble origin was described with explicit parallels with the life of Christ. when writing about Mussolini's blacksmith father and mother, Fascist propaganda presented them symbolically as the Holy Family ("They are but Mary and Joseph in relation to Christ"). His hometown of Predappio was developed as a place of mass tourism and symbolic pilgrimage. The Vatican implied that heavenly powers were aware that Mussolini had saved Italy from Bolshevism and thus protected him. Pope Pius XI referred to him as "the man of Providence" during the aftermath of the Lateran Treaty. Fascist state media described Mussolini's public speeches as sacramental meetings between "Il Duce" and the Italian people. Mussolini's melodramatic style of oratory was both pantomimic and liturgical, with exaggerated poses and hand movements, and prominent variations in the pitch and tone of his voice. Mussolini intended his speeches to be faith-inspiring theatrical performances and stated that "the crowd does not have to know; it must believe".

In addition to being depicted as being chosen by God, the Italian Fascist regime presented Mussolini himself having omnipotent or godlike characteristics, such as being able to work superhuman amounts (14–16 hours) daily and never appearing tired. Fascist newspapers implied even that Mussolini had performed miracles, such as stopping the lava flow of Mount Etna in Sicily and invoking rain in the drought-suffering Italian-occupied Libya during his visit to the region in March 1937. A story of a deaf-mute boy being cured after listening in a crowd to a speech of Mussolini was told in an elementary school manual.

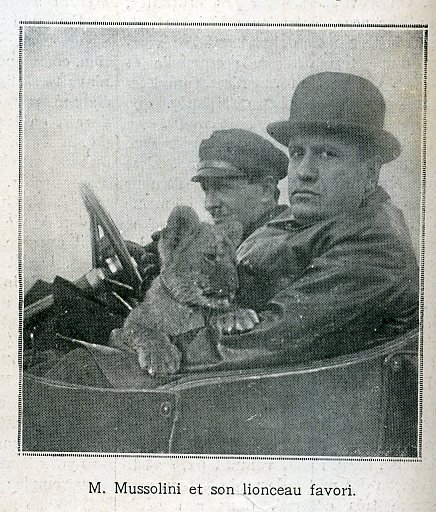
Mussolini with his pet lion cub Ras, 1924

His overtly-belligerent image did not prevent Fascist newspapers from declaring he had done more for peace than anyone else, on the principle that Mussolini always did better than everyone else. Fascist propaganda proclaimed that he had improved the Italian people morally, materially, and spiritually. Mussolini was "Il Duce" and as such he had been proclaimed in song even before the seizure of power. The Italian invasion of Ethiopia in 1935 was presented as a revival of the Roman Empire, with Mussolini being portrayed as the Roman emperor Augustus.

In order to improve the image of Fascist Italy in North Africa and the Levant and to gain support from the Arabs, Mussolini had himself declared the "Protector of Islam" during an official visit to Italian-occupied Libya in 1937. He also got the Sword of Islam.

=== Action ===
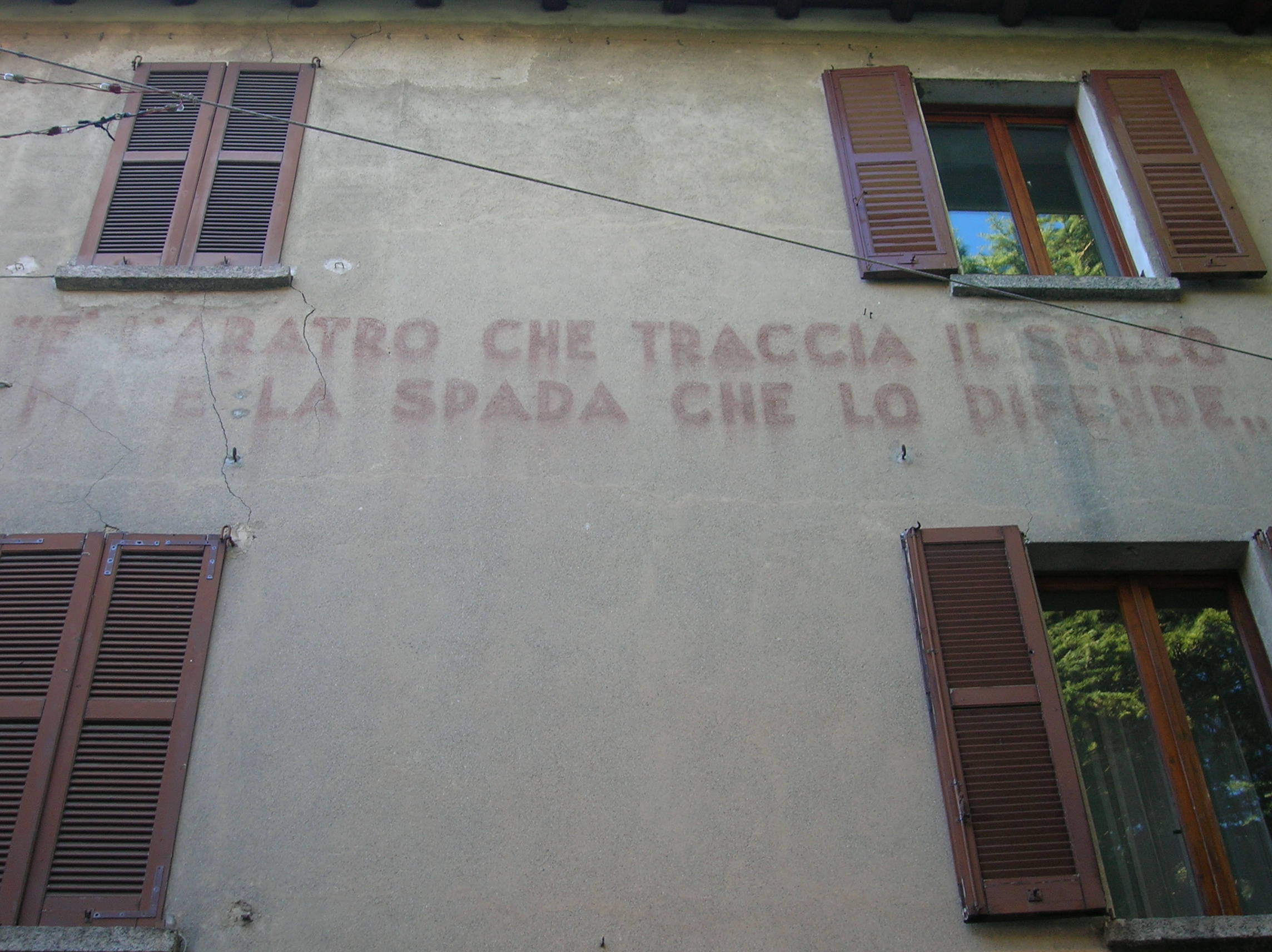
Slogan: "The plow makes the furrow, but the sword defends it", with a reference to the Romulus and Remus legend.

Italian Fascism was among the most visible of the contemporary political movements that had emerged following World War I; it emphasised action and violence over talk and reason. Italian Fascism was used to justify taking up notions and dropping them again. Economic issues were presented in a heroic and militaristic manner, with programs being termed the Battle of Wheat and the Battle of the Lira. Military matters were also straightforwardly praised, with the aim of primacy on land, sea, and air; disarmament was seen as impossible.

War, conquest, and killing were praised as the essence of manhood. A Fascist encyclopedia proclaimed that "nothing is ever won in history without bloodshed", drawing upon older themes of suffering being necessary for greatness which had been promoted during World War I. World War I was often cited in Fascist propaganda, with many prominent Italian Fascists displaying many medals from the conflict. To such figures as Gabriele d'Annunzio, the return of peace meant only the return of the humdrum, but the ideal was still war, themes that Italian Fascism drew into its propaganda. Mussolini, shortly before the seizure of power, proclaimed violence as better than compromise and bargaining. Afterwards, there was a prolonged period during which the absence of military action did not prevent the government from many belligerent statements. Interviews appearing in foreign press, in which Mussolini spoke of wanting peace, had that portion censored out before they appeared in Italian newspapers.

Italian victories in the Spanish Civil War, in which the Royal Italian Army sent the Corpo Truppe Volontarie ('Corps of Volunteer Troops') to intervene on behalf of the Spanish Nationalists, were heralded in the Fascist state media. The Italian invasion of Albania in 1939 was presented as a splendid act of aggression. In the run-up to World War II, Mussolini's claim that he could field 8 million was quickly exaggerated to 9 million and then to 12 million. The continually-bellicose pose created an embarrassment with the outbreak of World War II since failure to join the war would undermine the propaganda's desired effects.

The Italians were called to be like Roman legionaries, and their opponents were depicted as weak and enthralled by money. The United Kingdom was denounced in particular, but both France and later the United States, when its sympathies were clearly turning toward the Allies, also came in for abuse. Heroism was exaggerated. Violent acts committed by the Italian Fascists prior to their seizure of power in the Kingdom of Italy were glorified and legitimized. The March on Rome of 1922 was presented mythically as a bloody and heroic seizure of power.

Futurism was a useful part of the cultural scene because of its militaristic elements. A Fascist doctrine was first set forth in The Manifesto of the Fasci of Combat. Years later, a different set of ideas were enumerated in The Doctrine of Fascism, which was purportedly written entirely by Benito Mussolini although he wrote only the second part, and the first part was actually also written by Giovanni Gentile.

Fascism's internal contradictions, such as its changing official doctrines, were justified by Mussolini as a product of its nature: a doctrine of action and a revolt against the conformity and alienation of bourgeois society:

The Fascist accepts and loves life; he rejects and despises suicide as cowardly. Life as he understands it means duty, elevation, conquest; life must be lofty and full, it must be lived for oneself but above all for others, both near bye [sic] and far off, present and future.

— Benito Mussolini, The Doctrine of Fascism, 1933.

=== Unity ===
The "fasces of unity", featured along with the Italian tricolor on the emblem of the National Fascist Party

National and social unity was symbolized by the Fascist appropriation of the ancient Roman fasces themselves, the bound sticks being stronger together than individually. That drew on military themes from World War I, during which Italians were called to pull together into a unity. Mussolini openly proclaimed that Fascists were willing to kill or die when it was a question of the fatherland while the March on Rome was being prepared. Similarly, he declared that the State did not weaken the individual any more than a soldier was weakened by the rest of the regiment.

That was part of an explicit rejection of liberal individualism; the punitive aspect of the fasces, containing an axe, not being omitted. Furthermore, Fascism was meant to be a totalitarian or total experience, since it was impossible to a Fascist only in politics, and it therefore overtly rejected liberalism's private and public spheres. Fascism was not a party but a way of life. The corporatist State was offered as a unifying form of politics, as opposed to liberal democracy. Fascism and the state were identified, and everything was to be encompassed in the state.

Work was presented as a social duty of every citizen, because Italy was greater than any individual purpose. Beehives were presented as a model of industry and harmony. Furthermore, the unity would allow the entire nation to throw itself into support of military necessity. The sanctions imposed by the League of Nations while Fascist Italy invaded Ethiopia were used to unite the country against the "aggression".

=== Empire ===
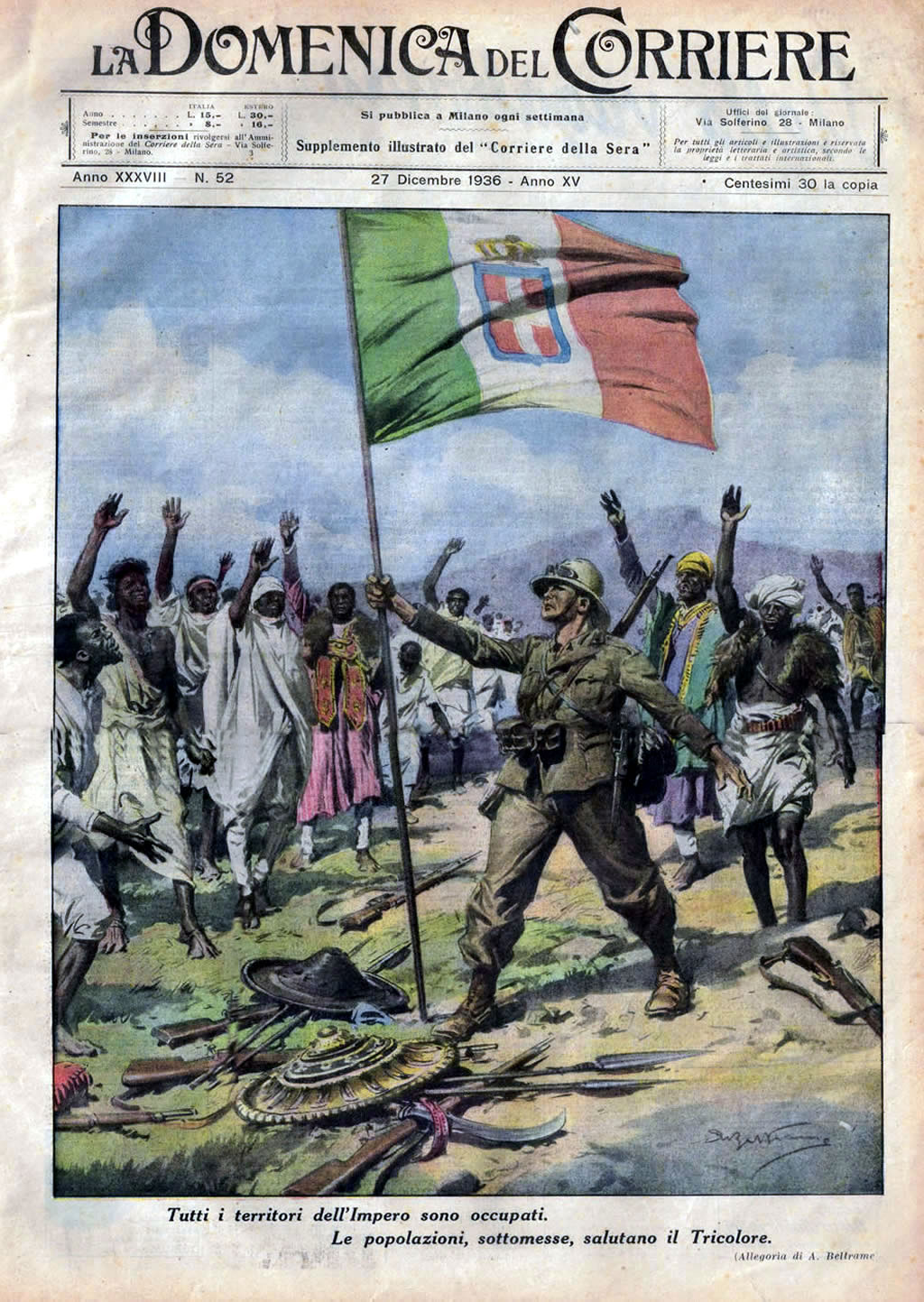
Cover of La Domenica del Corriere depicting the Italian victory in the Second Italo-Ethiopian War

Reviving the glories of the Roman Empire in modern Italy was a common theme. That called for the control of Mare Nostrum (" Our Sea", as the Mediterranean Sea was called in ancient Rome). France, the United Kingdom, and other powers were denounced as having kept Italy immured. Concerted efforts were made to drum up enthusiasm for colonialism in the 1930s.

Besides its symbolic aspects, the fasces had been carried by the lictors of ancient Rome as a representation of authority. April 21, the anniversary of the founding of Rome, was proclaimed a Fascist holiday that was intended to replace the socialist Labour Day as a celebration of the Roman virtues of "work" and "discipline". Rome's role in establishing Christianity as a universal religion was also exalted.

Architecture was used to supplement the Roman revival by juxtaposing modern monuments with ancient buildings, such as the creation of the Via dell'Impero. In the city of Rome, archaeological and propagandist projects involving the clearing, isolation (often by deliberately destroying surrounding medieval buildings) and restoration of key monuments such as the Ara Pacis and the Mausoleum of Augustus received strong support from the fascist regime. A major propaganda event was the opening of the "Augustan Exhibition of Romanitas" on 23 September 1937 to celebrate the 2000th anniversary of the birth of Augustus. There, the symbolic connection between Caesarean leadership of Augustus and Mussolini's dictatorship was stressed. At the exhibition entrance was inscribed a quote from Mussolini: "Italians, you must ensure that the glories of the past are surpassed by the triumphs of the future". Rome thus constituted a point of reference in Fascism's dream of building an aggressive and forward-looking Italy of the future. After the successful military campaign against Ethiopia and the subsequent proclamation of the Italian Empire, regime propaganda depicted Fascism now even overshadowing its Roman past.

=== Spazio vitale ===
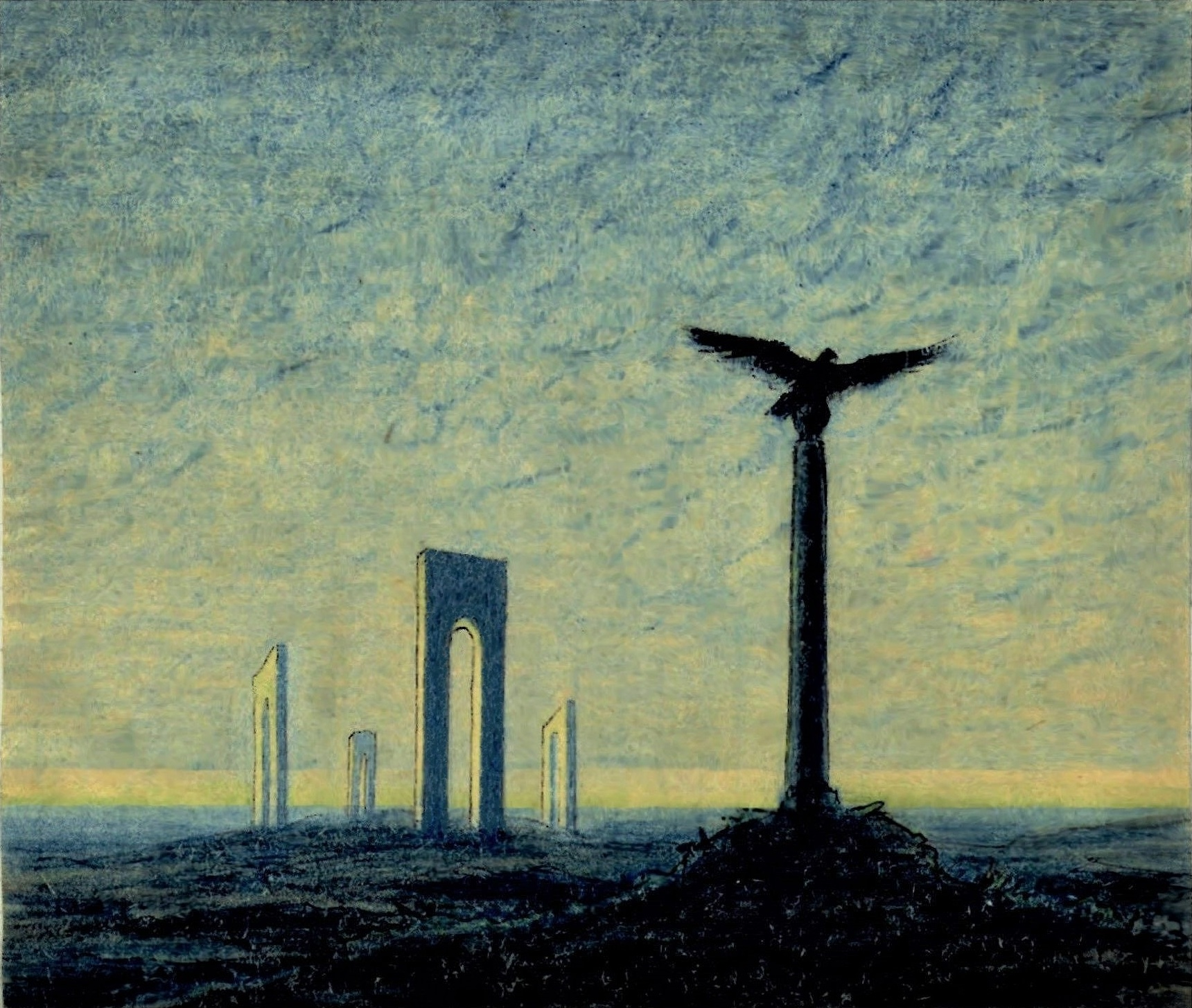
In Fascist propaganda, the dead are considered part of the fight for "vital space": "Guard at the borders" (Guardia ai confini), project for a war cemetery by Arnaldo dell'Ira, 1941.

Spazio vitale, living space, or vital space, was presented as needing conquest. It would strengthen the country by drawing off its surplus population and send landless peasants and the unemployed to work the earth, buy Italian goods and act as a garrison. Millions of Italians could live in Ethiopia, and exaggerated claims were made of its resources.

That would amend the situation after World War I in which Fascists alleged that the Allies had cheated Italy of expansion into the former Austro-Hungarian and Ottoman Empires.

=== Fertility ===
Even while arguing that the population had to be drained off, propaganda urged greater fertility and derided men who failed to produce children and women whose Parisian fashions did not fit them for bearing children. Slogans urged maternity as the female form of patriotism. Mussolini instructed the heads of fascist women's organisations to go home and tell the women that they needed many births. To help the "battle of births", assistance had to be given to mothers and newborns, and the founding of an organisation to do so was trumpeted. Contraception was decried as producing medical problems.

Mussolini also called for a more rural Italy to increase births.

The "battles" to reclaim land and increase grain production, Mussolini trumpeted, had produced enough that Italy could hold 10 million more people.

=== Civilisation ===
Fascist rhetoric portrayed the attack on Ethiopia as advancing the cause of civilisation. Other European nations were called on to stand with Italy against alleged "savage cannibals" and "slave-holders". This rhetoric was backed up by the Gold for the Fatherland initiative, which involved the donation of wedding rings and other forms of gold by Italian citizens in exchange for steel rings bearing the words "Gold for the Fatherland". Many Italians participated, and even Rachele Mussolini was known to have donated her wedding ring. The donated gold was then collected and used to fund the war effort.

==== Anti-Ethiopian ====
During the war, propaganda was spread about exaggerated Ethiopian atrocities, both the abuse of prisoners and the misuse of the Red Cross symbol on military installations.

=== Economics ===
A series of calculated lies was propagated to win support for the Ethiopian venture by claiming that Italy was self-sufficient in food, and enough oil had been stockpiled.

=== Bolshevism ===
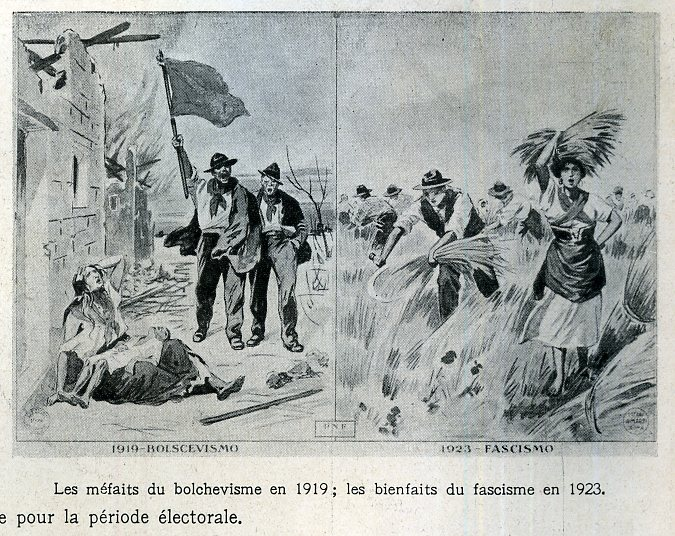
"The misdeeds of Bolshevism in 1919, the benefits of Fascism in 1923"

Socialism was resisted, particularly in its internationalist forms. Socialist forces were denounced as a "Russian army". An editorialist, afraid that Fascist violence would repulse women, warned them that the killings were necessary to save Italy from the "Bolshevist beast."

In his first speech as a deputy, Mussolini proclaimed that no dealings were possible between Communism and Fascism even while he proclaimed his willingness to work with other groups.

The Spanish Civil War was presented as a crusade against Communism.

=== Foreign culture ===
The influx of foreign culture was attacked. "Americanism" was the object of an organised propaganda campaign that attacked as a "grease stain which is spreading through the whole of European life". French and Russian novels and H. G. Wells's Outline of History were also attacked as contaminating youth. British literature was used to show them as decadent as the French, their low birth rate was decried and it was proclaimed that Italy had saved Britain and France during World War I.

Italianization of street names and monuments in linguistically-Slavic and -German regions of Italy was mandated by legislation, and teachers instructing in languages other than Italian were persecuted (See Katakombenschule). In 1926, new legislation was introduced decreeing the Italianization of Slavic surnames. Sports clubs were likewise forced to Italianize their names: A.C. Milan became Milano, and Internazionale was renamed Ambrosiana, after the patron saint of Milan.

=== Democracy ===
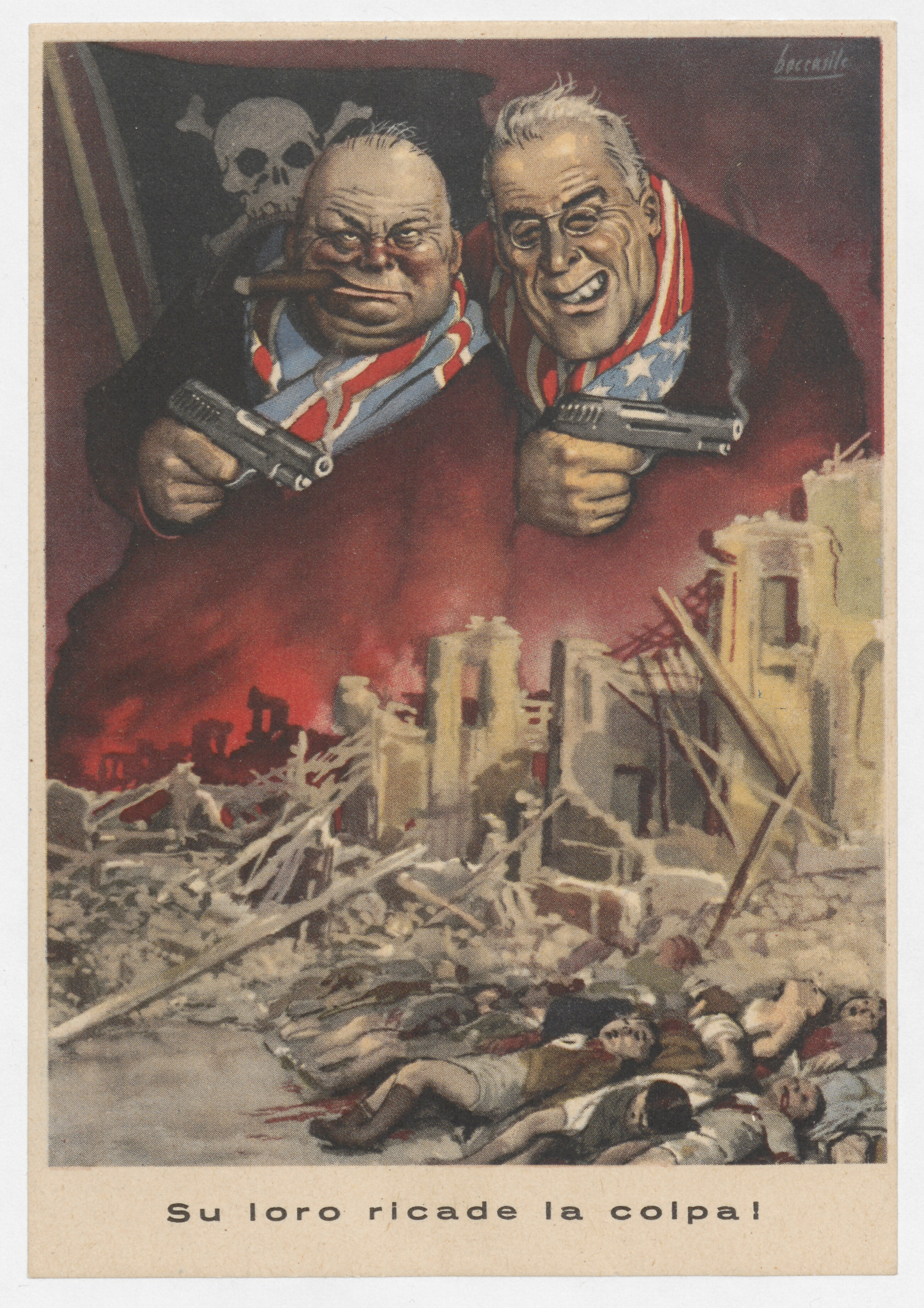
Italian WWII propaganda poster

Democracy and liberalism were pronounced moribund, with praise cited that Fascism received everywhere and claims that the workers of North America wished they had a Mussolini. In 1934, Mussolini declared both democracy and liberalism dead. Bourgeois culture and morality were seen as integral parts of liberalism and were thus attacked. The bourgeoisie supposedly valued utilitarianism, materialism, well-being and maintaining the status quo instead of the fascist virtues of dynamism, courage, discipline and self-sacrifice. An anti-bourgeois exhibition was opened on 29 November 1937. It denounced "typical aspects of bourgeois mentality" and ridiculed gestures and customs such as handshakes, suits, top hats and afternoon tea, all to which fascism was to provide its own replacements, such as the Roman salute. Even the Gregorian calendar was deemed as being bourgeois; in the Era Fascista, the year began on October 29, the day after the anniversary of the March on Rome, and the years were to be counted from 1922 by using Roman numerals.

The Nazi rise to power was used as Germany's imitating Italy, which would soon be followed by other nations.

The attack on Ethiopia was framed as Italy's vigour and idealism easily crushing the decadent, bloodless and cowardly democracies, especially as they supported barbarians over the "mother of civilizations".

=== Plutocracies ===
The United States was particularly resented for its wealth and position.

Joining World War II was presented as a war on decadent plutocracies. The powers were also claimed to have prevented Italian imperialism. Mussolini began to decry the oppression that Italy suffered as early as the peace negotiations of World War I and the first days of Fascism as a movement.

== Media ==
=== Newspapers ===
Authorities were allowed to confiscate newspapers on the grounds of publishing false information likely to incite class hatred or to bring the government into contempt. Meanwhile, pro-Fascist journals were subsidized, and by 1926, government permission was needed to publish.

=== Slogans ===
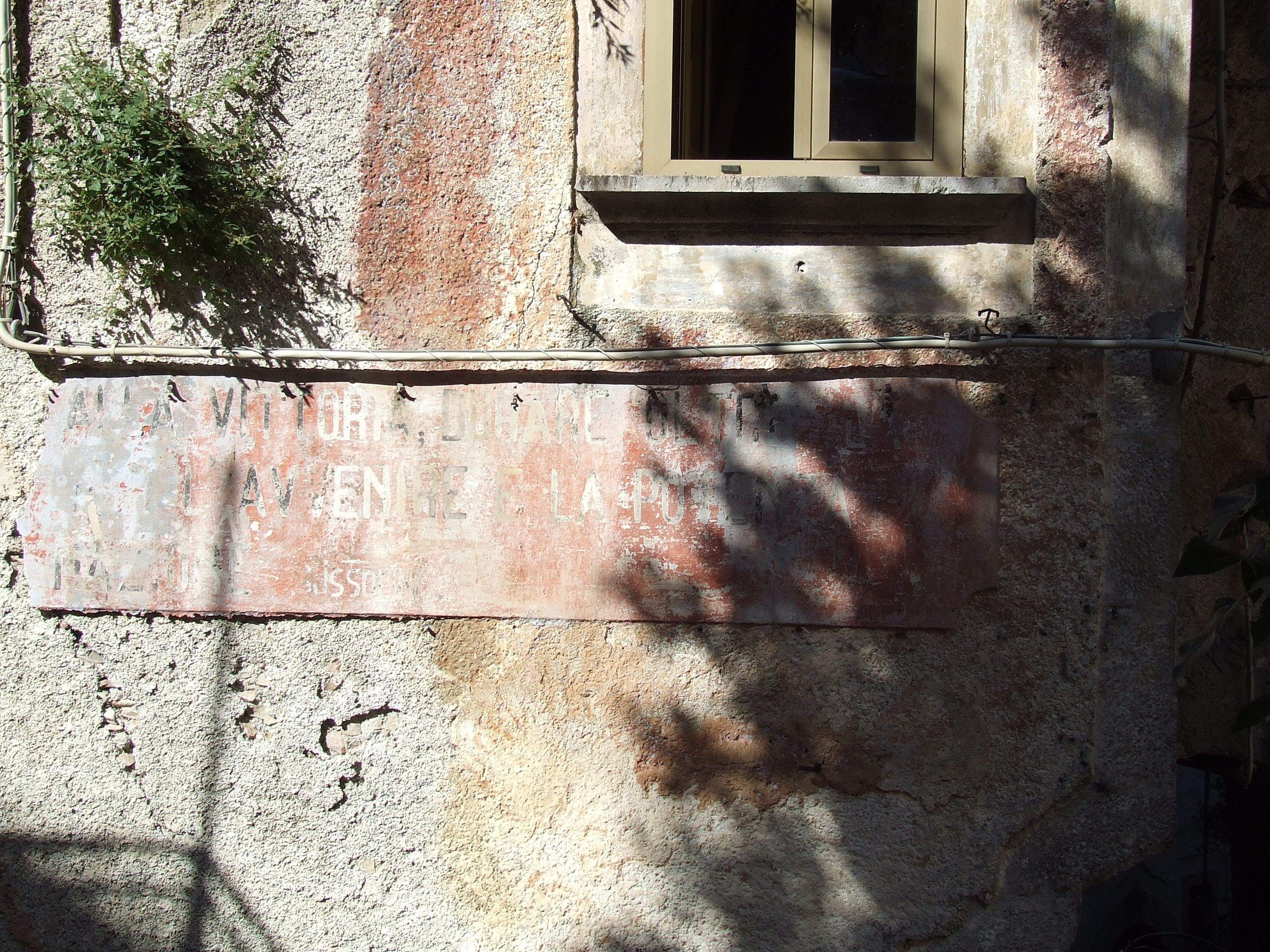
"Durare sino alla vittoria! Durare oltre la vittoria, per l'avvenire e la potenza della nazione"

Slogans were widely used and especially inscribed on walls.

=== Posters ===
Many of Italy's leading graphic artists produced Fascist posters.

During World War II, to counter British pamphlets that proclaimed bombs the curse of Garibaldi, posters proclaimed that a British victory meant worse than bombs, barbarism, would befall them. Americans were depicted as ready to plunder Italy's treasures.

=== Exhibition ===
The Exhibition of the Fascist Revolution was devised as propaganda to recount Italian history to the March on Rome to engage the visitors with Fascist Italy emotionally.

=== March ===
Two major marches were devised as propaganda: the March on Rome, which brought Mussolini to power, and the March of the Iron Will, the capturing of the Ethiopian capital. The notion of a "march on Rome" was a concept to inspire heroism and sacrifice, and the Fascists made full use of the notion.

=== Song ===
Songs were widely used for propaganda purposes. Even prior to coming to power, Mussolini had been praised in song. Its anthem was Giovinezza ("Youth").

=== Radio ===
With the spread of ownership of radio units during the Fascist regime, radio became the major tool for propagandising the population. It was used to broadcast Mussolini's open-air speeches and as an instrument for propagandizing youth. The American author Ezra Pound broadcast on short-wave radio to propagandize the United States.

=== Film ===
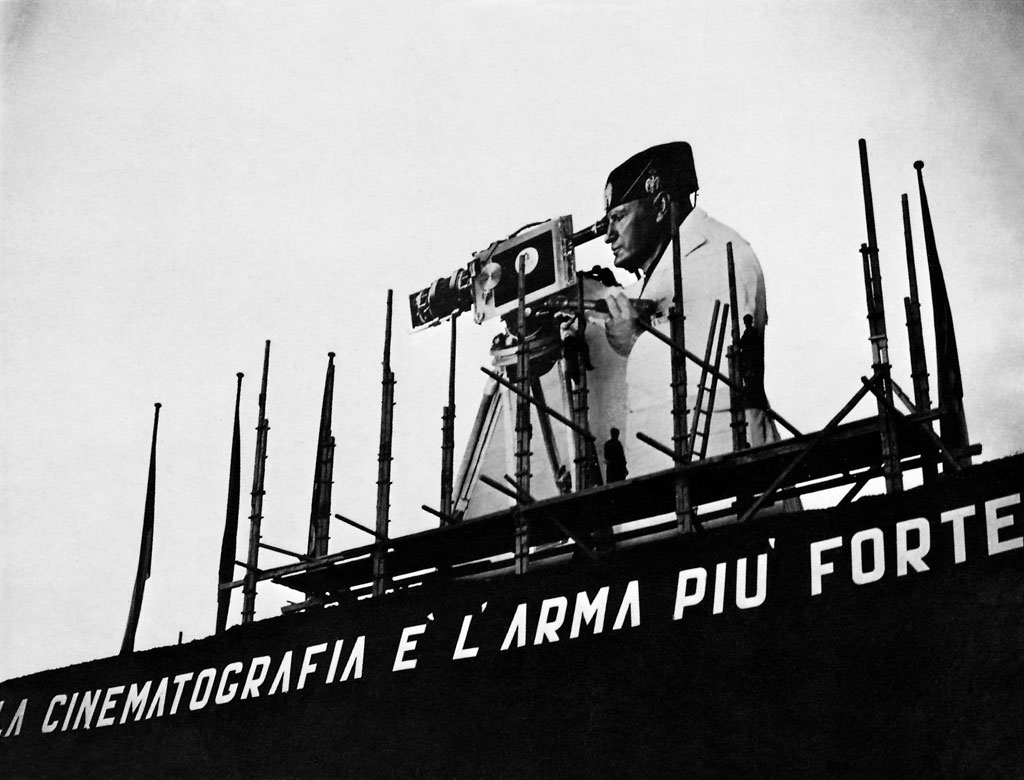
"Cinematography is the strongest weapon" banner during inauguration of Istituto Luce's new headquarters

In 1924, the Istituto Luce was set up by the fascist government to oversee cinema operations in Italy. The organisation's main role was the creation of newsreels shown before films. From 1934 to 1935, more efforts were made by the governments to control the Italian film industry. In 1934, Luigi Freddi headed the Direzione Generale per la Cinema, whose purpose was to censor films made that could be harmful for the Fascist government. That caused many American films to be banned and many Italian scripts to be modified. In 1935, the Ente Nazionale Industrie Cinematografiche (ENIC) was set up to make films after it had bought up a movie theatre chain, and it expanded in 1938 to regulate the number of foreign films coming into Italy. The Fascist regime was never successful at making propagandist films show a political message. Film was not widely used for propaganda, as the Italian public was not interested in "serious" films that the government produced but wanted realistic films. However, censorship was heavily used to avoid unwanted material, and a governmental body was set up to produce documentaries on Fascist achievements.

=== Schools ===
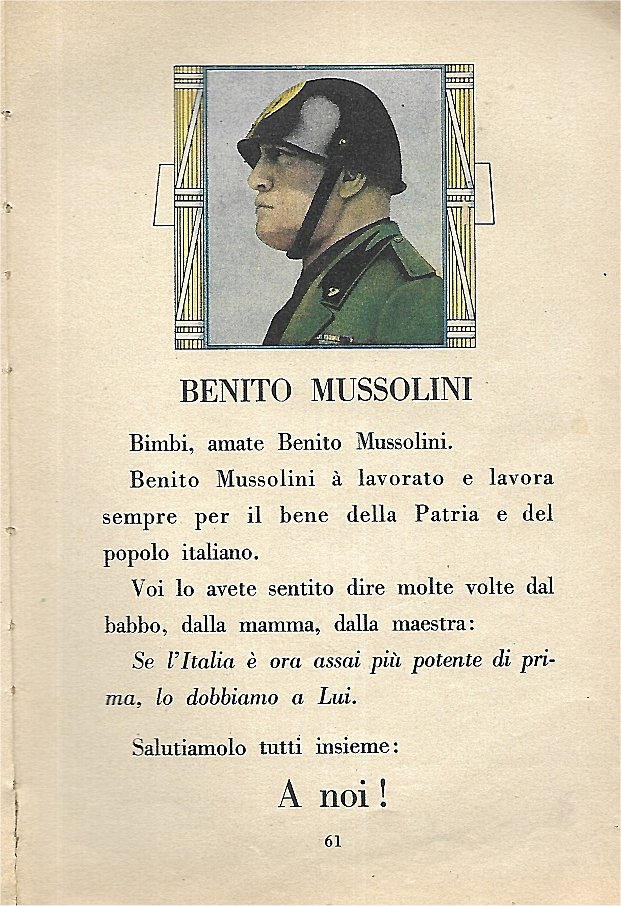
From a 1936 Fascist regime textbook: "Kids, love Benito Mussolini. Benito Mussolini has worked and works always for the good of the Homeland and of the Italian people. You've overheard this many times from daddy, from mom, from the teacher: If Italy is now far more powerful than before, we owe it to Him. Let's all greet him together: To us!"

Curriculums for schools were immediately overhauled for Fascist purposes in a manner that the Nazis later admitted to imitating, and elementary schools soon spent twenty percent of their time teaching children to be good Fascists. Teachers were removed if they did not conform, and textbooks were required to emphasize the "Fascist soul".

=== Youth groups ===
Young Fascists and University Fascist Groups existed to channel talent to the Fascist Party and for several years were the party's only source of new members. Students soon learned they had to join the university groups to advance. Mussolini proclaimed their purpose to be inspiring the youth for power and conquests as Fascists.

Up to the age of fourteen, the groups were mainly sports for physical fitness, but at fourteen, militaristic drills were added. They were given songs and commandments to mold their views. Everything from cultural institutes to camps was deployed to consolidate activities on Fascism.

=== Clothing ===
Italy implemented fashion standards to enforce certain political behavior. Attempting to strive women away from individuality, and bring them towards fascist conformity.

== See also ==
- American propaganda during World War II
- British propaganda during World War II
- Japanese propaganda during World War II
- Propaganda in Nazi Germany
- Propaganda in the Soviet Union
- The Doctrine of Fascism (1927)
- The Manifesto of the Italian Fasces of Combat (1919)
