= Mussolini and I =

1985 docudrama film directed by Alberto Negrin

- DVD cover of Mussolini and I
- Written by: Alberto Negrin; Nicola Badalucco
- Directed by: Alberto Negrin
- Starring: Bob Hoskins; Anthony Hopkins; Susan Sarandon
- Theme music composer: Egisto Macchi
- Countries of origin: Italy; France; West Germany; Switzerland; Spain; United States
- Original language: English

Production
- Producers: Mario Gallo; Enzo Guilioli
- Editors: Roberto Perpignani; Egisto Macchi
- Running time: 130 mins. (original); 240 mins. (extended)
- Production companies: HBO Premiere Films; Rai Radiotelevisione Italiana

Original release
- Network: Rai Uno; HBO
- Release: 15 April 1985

Mussolini and I (alternately titled Mussolini: The Decline and Fall of Il Duce) is a 1985 made-for-television docudrama film directed by Alberto Negrin. It chronicles the strained relationship between Italy's fascist dictator Benito Mussolini and his son-in-law and foreign minister, Count Galeazzo Ciano, based on Ciano's diaries. Made in English as an Italian-French-German-Swiss-Spanish-American co-production, with Bob Hoskins, Anthony Hopkins and Susan Sarandon in the leading roles, it first aired on Rai Uno on 15 April 1985 in a 130-minute version. On 8 September 1985, it premiered in the USA on HBO in an extended four-hour version.

All filming was done in Italy, including northern Italy's Gargnano, Merano, Bolzano, Verona, and in central Italy, Rome and L'Aquila. Filming was also done at the well-known Villa Torlonia and Palazzo Venezia. It was released on a 2-disc DVD in August 2003. It is divided into four segments for a total of 240 minutes and was released by Koch Entertainment.

== Plot ==
The film starts just before World War II and shows the political and personal side of Benito Mussolini's fall from power and his death and the end of the war. It delves into his relationship with his son in-law, daughter, wife, mistress, and Hitler.

== Production ==
Locations used included Mussolini's former residences Villa Torlonia and Villa Feltrinelli. The film reunited Hoskins and Hopkins after they had played Othello and Iago for the BBC Television Shakespeare series a few years earlier. Its Italian shoot overlapped with the filming (in Yugoslavia) of Mussolini: The Untold Story starring George C. Scott: when asked about the rival series by a journalist, Scott called Hopkins "the best English-speaking actor today". Hopkins's fee was reported in the press as $450,000.

== Reception ==
John J. O'Connor, reviewing for The New York Times, wrote that the script "keeps reducing historical issues to the dimensions of a kitchen drama. These particular kitchens just happen to be in magnificent Italian palazzos". He described Hoskins as "all done up in elaborate makeup with no place to go except to look terribly unhappy but determined to stick it out to the end", but praised the other leading performances and the production values.

== Cast ==
- Bob Hoskins as Benito Mussolini, dictator of Fascist Italy
- Susan Sarandon as Edda Ciano, Mussolini's daughter
- Anthony Hopkins as Galeazzo Ciano, 2nd Count of Cortellazzo and Buccari, Mussolini's son-in-law
- Annie Girardot as Rachele Mussolini, Mussolini's wife
- Barbara De Rossi as Claretta Petacci, Mussolini's mistress
- Massimo Dapporto as Vittorio Mussolini, Mussolini's son
- Vittorio Mezzogiorno as Alessandro Pavolini, friend of Galeazzo's and leader of the Republican Fascist Party
- Kurt Raab as Adolf Hitler, dictator of Nazi Germany
- Marne Maitland as King Victor Emmanuel III
- Hans-Dieter Asner as Joachim von Ribbentrop, Foreign Minister of the Third Reich
- Carlheinz Heitmann as Karl Wolff, Military Governor and Supreme SS and Police Leader of Northern Italy
- Harald Dietl as Otto Skorzeny, led Operation Oak to rescue Mussolini from Campo Imperatore
- Dietlinde Turban as Frau Beetz, born as Hildegard Burkhardt: she was a German intelligence agent who visited Galeazzo in prison and tried to help him
- Ted Rusoff as Francesco Saverio Nitti
- David-George Brown as Giuseppe Castellano
- Gianni Pulone as Enzo Galbiati
- Stefano De Sando as Dino Grandi
- Luciano Baglioni as Carlo Scorza
- Franco Meroni as Giuseppe Bottai
- Leslie Thomas as Emilio De Bono
- Piero Palermini as Roberto Farinacci
- Robert Sommer as Giacomo Suardo
- Franco Mazzieri as Giovanni Marinelli
- Ulrich Engst as Major Otto-Harald Mors
- Franco Fabrizi as Quinto Navarra
