= Arnaldo Mussolini =

Italian journalist and politician (1885–1931)

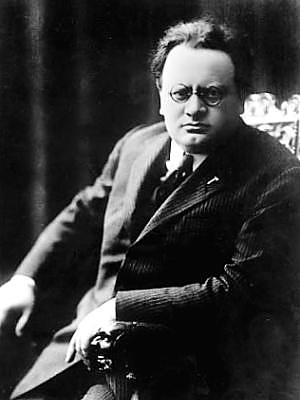

Personal details
- Born: 11 January 1885 Predappio, Kingdom of Italy
- Died: 21 December 1931 (aged 46) Milan, Italy
- Resting place: Cemetery in Mercato Saraceno
- Party: Italian Socialist Party (?–1914); National Fascist Party (1921–1931)
- Spouse: Augusta Bondanini (m. 1909)
- Children: 3
- Parents: Alessandro Mussolini (father); Rosa Maltoni (mother)
- Relatives: Benito Mussolini (brother); Mussolini family

Military service
- Allegiance: Kingdom of Italy
- Branch/service: Royal Italian Army
- Years of service: 1915-1918
- Rank: Lieutenant
- Battles/wars: World War I

Arnaldo Mussolini (11 January 1885 – 21 December 1931) was an Italian journalist and politician. He was the brother of fascist Prime Minister of Italy Benito Mussolini, and a fascist himself. He was also the brother of Edvige Mussolini and the brother-in-law of Rachele Mussolini.

== Biography ==
Arnaldo Mussolini was born at Dovia di Predappio.

A graduate of the agricultural school at Cesena in 1909, he married Augusta Bondanini who bore him three children: Sandro Italico Mussolini, Vito Mussolini and Rosina Mussolini. He was a teacher and commune secretary with the Italian Socialist Party in Predappio until 1914. Before devoting himself to teaching in his hometown, Arnaldo Mussolini was a professor of agriculture from 1908 to 1909 at the Institute of Falcon-Vial in San Vito al Tagliamento. He had a great affection for the region, and devoted many years to it, teaching at the aforementioned institution, as well as at elementary schools Carbona, in the municipality of San Vito. The town appointed him city clerk. As a tribute to this country that had welcomed him with affection, he called his eldest son Vito, after which the town reciprocated by placing, on behalf of Sanvitesi a plaque in the courtyard of the Falcon-Vial in memory of the beloved teacher.

Arnaldo Mussolini, like his brother Benito Mussolini, took part in World War I, attaining the rank of lieutenant, and in 1919 after the war's end, he moved to Milan. When he learned that his brother Benito had congratulated and rewarded with money the authors of the bomb-throwing which had caused serious injuries to several citizens in Via di San Damiano in Milan on 17 November 1919, "Arnaldo Mussolini, then not completely touched from the divine light of his brother", said to an accolyte: 'my brother is truly a criminal".

== Fascism ==
In Milan, Arnaldo became managing director of the newspaper founded by his brother, Il Popolo d'Italia, succeeding Manlio Morgagni, who worked in advertising. In 1922, when Benito became prime minister, Arnaldo took over leadership of the newspaper, staying faithful to the policies of his brother, while mitigating some of the excesses indulged in by Benito, with his own style of a meek tone and adhering to confidentiality. Benito Mussolini blindly trusted his brother Arnaldo, who also had the task of proofreading Benito's speeches.

Arnaldo was Benito's closest advisor; the brothers called each other on the telephone almost every night. Between 1923 and 1927, Arnaldo dedicated himself to journalism and to various publishing ventures, creating a journal for the Opera Nazionale Balilla, the Domenica dell'Agricoltore (Sunday Farmer), Rivista Illustrata (Illustrated Review), which he co-founded with Manlio Morgagni, Illustrazione Fascista (Illustrated Fascism), Bosco e Historia (Forest and History), while continuing to lead Il Popolo d'Italia.

His interest in nature led him also to dedicate himself to environmentalist causes, such as forest revival, the agriculture organization, to drainage projects, and becoming the first president of the Comitato Nazionale Forestale (National Forest Committee). On 27 November 1928 he was awarded the degree "honoris causa" in agricultural sciences.

In 1930, Arnaldo assisted with the founding of the School of Fascist Mysticism in Milan, supporting Niccolò Giani. The School's object was the training of the future leaders of the National Fascist Party. The School's president was Arnaldo's son Vito Mussolini.

Arnaldo Mussolini had an important part in defusing the cooled relations between the Fascist regime and the Catholic Church during the crisis of 1931, especially regarding the education of youth. Mussolini had signed a Concordat with the Catholic Church in 1929, but by 1931, after Fascist authority came into conflict with the superior organizational skills of Catholic groups, Mussolini retracted part of the concessions that he had made. Catholic groups were critical of the violence of Fascist extremists; the bulletin of the women's Catholic organization Gioventù Femminile denounced the Fascists, and banned Fascist members from Gioventù Femminile. Fascist attacks on Catholic groups, such as the large Azione Cattolica Italiana, and Church property followed. On 4 June 1931 the Catholic Church issued the call for a protest against new laws and violence suffered by Catholic organizations, such as a government prohibition against explaining the Gospel during Mass (priests delivering sermons). In September, thanks to Arnaldo Mussolini, a compromise was reached, whereby the young Catholics could organize just inside the Azione Cattolica Italiana, without performing any political activities. The ACI, for its part, was limited to local activities under the control of the bishops. The agreements with the Holy See were sent by the Ministry of Interior to all prefectures with a circular telegram of 16 September 1931.

According to Marco Zeni, Arnaldo Mussolini was assigned to manage the interests of Ida Dalser, Benito's "secret mistress" and of their son Benito Albino Dalser. While Ida Dalser was interned in a mental hospital, Arnaldo – whether because of orders he received, or through personal affection, it is not clear – treated his nephew Benito Albino in the best possible way. After the death of his uncle Arnaldo, Albino was committed, like his mother, to a mental hospital, where he died in 1942.

Arnaldo Mussolini died suddenly of a heart attack in Milan on 21 December 1931, aged 46.

His brother Benito writes his biography, Vita di Arnaldo (Life of Arnaldo), which begins: "I want to write tonight - 25 December 1931 - X - one of the saddest Christmases - perhaps the saddest - of my life, the first pages of the book that I dedicate to the memory of Arnaldo. Today, at Palazzo Venezia, for six hours, I began the counting of the papers left by him; a necessary, delicate operation, which I have completed and will carry out with great trepidation. "

He was buried in the small cemetery in Paderno di Mercato Saraceno, birthplace of his wife Augusta Bondanini. In the family home, his private studio with furnishings and memorabilia of the time were kept on exhibit. At Forlì, the Casa del Balilla, then the GIL, opened a votive chapel dedicated to him.

In the church of Santa Maria Nuova, at Mercato Saraceno, a plaque was installed under orders of Benito Mussolini to mark the burial ground. The little cemetery of Paderno has become inaccessible.

The journalists' organization, "Istituto Nazionale di Previdenza dei Giornalisti Italiani Arnaldo Mussolini", was dedicated to him after his death while Benito Mussolini was in power. After the end of World War II, it was renamed the "INPGI G. Amendola".

== Sources ==
- Benito Mussolini, Vita di Arnaldo, Tipografia del "Popolo d'Italia", Milano, 1932
- Marcello Staglieno, Arnaldo e Benito, due fratelli, Mondadori, 2004.
- Arnaldo Mussolini, Coscienza e dovere, Raido, Roma, 2007
- Michelangelo Ingrassia, L'idea di fascismo in Arnaldo Mussolini, Palermo, ISSPE, 1998
