= Rosa Maltoni =

Mother of Benito Mussolini (1858–1905)

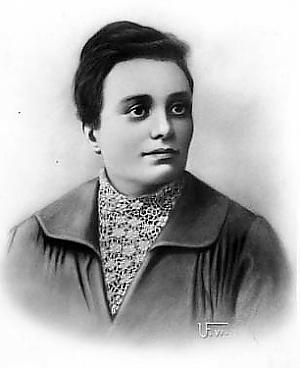
- Born: 22 April 1858; San Martino in Strada, Forlì, Papal States
- Died: 19 February 1905 (aged 46); Predappio, Italy
- Occupation: Teacher
- Spouse: Alessandro Mussolini (m. 1882)
- Children: Benito; Arnaldo; Edvige
- Family: Mussolini family

Rosa Maltoni Mussolini (née Maltoni; 22 April 1858 – 19 February 1905) was an Italian schoolteacher who was the mother of Benito Mussolini, the Italian Fascist dictator.

== Personal life ==
Rosa Maltoni was the mother of Benito, Arnaldo and Edvige Mussolini, the mother-in-law of Rachele Mussolini and the paternal grandmother of Bruno Mussolini, Edda Mussolini, Romano Mussolini, and Vittorio Mussolini. Maltoni was a nominal Catholic schoolteacher who married the socialist Alessandro Mussolini against the wishes of her father. After Benito, Rosa had three more children, Arnaldo, Laura, and Edvige. She died of meningitis in 1905 when her son, Benito Mussolini, was only 22.

Mussolini was reportedly very attached to his mother, and during the Fascist period, Rosa came to represent the ideal Italian woman. On 17 June 1930, a ceremony was held to honor her as a "great educator and glorious mother."
