= Vincere =

- English-language poster
- Directed by: Marco Bellocchio
- Written by: Marco Bellocchio; Daniela Ceselli
- Produced by: Mario Gianani
- Starring: Giovanna Mezzogiorno; Filippo Timi
- Cinematography: Daniele Ciprì
- Edited by: Francesca Calvelli
- Music by: Carlo Crivelli
- Distributed by: 01 Distribution; IFC Films
- Release dates: 19 May 2009 (Cannes); 20 May 2009 (Italy); 25 November 2009 (France)
- Running time: 128 minutes
- Countries: Italy; France
- Language: Italian
- Budget: €9 million
- Box office: €2,089,000

Vincere (in English, 'To Win') is a 2009 Italian biographical historical drama film directed by Marco Bellocchio, co-written by Bellocchio and Daniela Ceselli. Its based on the life of Benito Mussolini's first wife Ida Dalser. It stars Giovanna Mezzogiorno as Dalser and Filippo Timi as Mussolini.

The film competed for the Palme d'Or at the 2009 Cannes Film Festival. It was theatrically released in Italy on 20 May 2009 by 01 Distribution.

== Plot ==
The film opens in 1907, with Ida Dalser watching a speech by the young journalist and socialist Benito Mussolini. She immediately falls in love with him and they begin a torrid affair. Mussolini initially opposes Italian involvement in the European Great War, but then reverses his position. This leads to his expulsion from the Italian Socialist Party, and he develops a new political philosophy, which will become Italian fascism. He decides to start a newspaper to expound his views, and Dalser sells all her belongings to finance it. They have a son, Benito, then Mussolini goes to war, and Dalser does not hear from him for a long time. When she does, he is in hospital recovering from wounds, but when she goes to visit him, she finds that he has a new wife and a daughter. Dalser insists that he is legally married to her, but he denies it.

From then on, Mussolini appears in the film only in newsreels, reflecting the fact that Dalser never sees him in person again. By the early 1920s, he is Italy's leader, and in the process of concluding a concordat with the Vatican. Dalser intensifies her campaign to prove that she is Mussolini's wife and that her son, Benito Albino, is legitimate. She finds that all the might of the fascist state is turned against her. She is committed to an asylum, and when she continues to protest from there by writing to the newspapers, and even to the Pope, Benito Albino is committed to a different asylum. Dalser descends gradually into madness. Although the film ends with a caption listing the official cause for their deaths (Dalser in 1937 and Benito Albino in 1942), the film's last scenes hint at the possibility that one or both of them were murdered.

== Cast ==
- Giovanna Mezzogiorno as Ida Dalser
- Filippo Timi as both Benito Mussolini and Benito Albino Mussolini
- Michela Cescon as Rachele Guidi
- Fausto Russo Alesi as Riccardo Paicher
- Pier Giorgio Bellocchio as Pietro Fedele
- Corrado Invernizzi as Dottor Cappelletti
- Nataliya Kozhenova as Suora

== Reception ==
The film received universal acclaim from film critics. Vincere has an approval rating of 91% on review aggregator website Rotten Tomatoes, based on 93 reviews, and an average rating of 7.6/10. The website's critical consensus states: " "Part political treatise, part melodrama, Marco Bellocchio's Mussolini biopic forsakes historical details in favor of absorbing emotion -- and provides a showcase for a stunning performance from Giovanna Mezzogiorno." Metacritic assigned the film a weighted average score of 85 out of 100, based on 24 critics, indicating "universal acclaim".

Vincere was well received by French critics during the 2009 Cannes Film Festival, and was considered to be a possible Palme d'Or contender, along with Un Prophète from Jacques Audiard and (the eventual winner) The White Ribbon from Michael Haneke.

In the Los Angeles Times, critic Saul Austerlitz wrote:"Vincere is a melodrama with pretensions to the operatic, but it is also, like all of Bellocchio’s work, a study in human frailty and grace -- a black canvas studded with shafts of brilliant light."

== Awards ==
It won four Silver Hugos at the Chicago International Film Festival (Best Actor (Filippo Timi), Best Actress (Giovanna Mezzogiorno), Best Director and Best Cinematography (Daniele Ciprì), and won four Silver Ribbon (Actress (Giovanna Mezzogiorno), Cinematography, Editing and Art Direction). Giovanna Mezzogiorno was rewarded with the National Society of Film Critics Award for Best Actress 2010.
