= Maltoni =

Maltoni is an Italian surname. Notable people with the surname include:

- Costante Maltoni (1915–1980), Italian diplomat and archbishop
- Rosa Maltoni (1858–1905), Italian mother of Benito Mussolini
