= Edvige Mussolini =

Sister of Benito Mussolini (1888–1952)

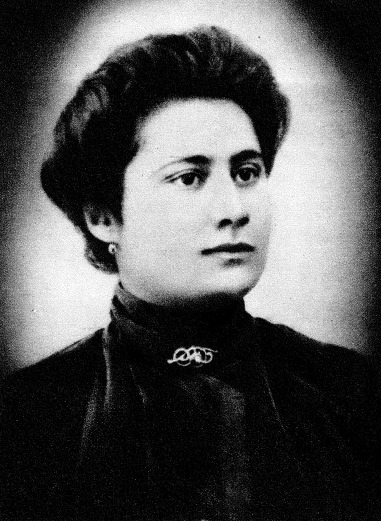
- Mussolini in 1918
- Born: 10 November 1888; Predappio, Kingdom of Italy
- Died: 20 May 1952 (aged 63); Rome, Italy
- Occupations: Writer, journalist
- Spouse: Michele Mancini
- Children: Giuseppe; Paolo; Giuseppina; Rosa Cristina
- Relatives: Mussolini family
- Writing career
- Notable work: Mio fratello Benito

Edvige Mussolini (Italian: [edˈviːdʒe mussoˈliːni]; 10 November 1888 – 20 May 1952) was the younger sister of Arnaldo and Benito Mussolini.

== Biography ==
Edvige was the daughter of Alessandro Mussolini, a blacksmith and activist, first anarchist and later socialist, as well as a town and district councillor of Predappio, and Rosa Maltoni, a schoolteacher. After marrying Michele Mancini, she moved from Predappio to Premilcuore, where her husband became podestà. She had two children: Giuseppe and Rosetta (the latter married Pier Giovanni Ricci on 15 February 1928).

In 1940 she obtained the annulment of the sentence condemning the writer Pitigrilli (Dino Segre), accused of being an anti-fascist, to be locked up in the internment camp of L'Aquila.

Her son Giuseppe Mancini, vice-brigadier of the 6th Company of the Tagliamento Legion of the Republican National Guard, who surrendered to the partisans, was killed on 28 April 1945 with 42 other comrades in the Rovetta massacre, the same day as his uncle Benito.

Until 1940, Edvige kept the diaries which, according to some historians, her brother Benito had written between 1935 and 1939. The five diaries have been extensively studied over the years to verify their authenticity. The diaries reveal an intimate and melancholic Mussolini, frightened of Hitler, opposed to the war, and "indifferent" to the Jews.

In this study, the author of the research work, Emilio Gentile, after citing the work of other researchers who have judged these notebooks to be authentic, highlights a number of elements (factual errors that are difficult to impute to Mussolini, spellings of proper names, etc.) that tend to cast doubt on their authenticity. Given that these notebooks contain nothing that was not already known from other sources, and that the only novelty they bring is that they give an image of the Duce that is different from the one usually accepted, the author raises the possibility, with all reservations, that a forgery may have been fabricated, from known and public materials, precisely with the aim of correcting the said image in a favourable direction.

After the war, Edvige was still very attached to her brother: her memoirs were collected and transcribed by Rosetta Ricci Crisolini in Mio fratello Benito, published by La Fenice, Florence, in 1957. In the book, Edvige recounts her own memories, letters, and conversations with her brother; among other things, Edvige argues against the thesis that Benito was anti-Semitic, including a testimony by Mussolini himself that he joined anti-Semitism because of the need for an alliance with Hitler.

She died in Rome on 20 May 1952 at the age of 63.
