= Marcello Sorgi =

Italian journalist and author (born 1955)

- Born: Marcello Sorgi; 31 March 1955 (age 70); Palermo, Italy
- Occupation: Journalist
- Height: 1.73 m (5 ft 8 in)
- Spouse: Anna Chimenti

Marcello Sorgi (born 31 March 1955) is an Italian journalist and author.

Born in Palermo, the son of a criminal defense lawyer, Sorgi started his career as a journalist for the newspaper L'Ora, and then he worked Il Messaggero and La Stampa. In 1996 he became the director of RAI TV's TG1, then in 1998, left the office, he was the director of La Stampa until 2005.

In 2000 Sorgi released a book-length interview with Sicilian novelist Andrea Camilleri, La testa ci fa dire. In 2009 he wrote the book Edda Ciano and the Communist in which he tells the illicit love story between Edda Ciano, Benito Mussolini's daughter, and a regional communist leader, Leonida Bongiorno, which had as its background on the Isle of Lipari. The book was adapted into a film with the same name, directed by Graziano Diana and starred by Alessandro Preziosi and Stefania Rocca.

In 2010, Sorgi wrote Le amanti del vulcano (The Volcano Lovers), a historical reconstruction of the love triangle between Roberto Rossellini, Ingrid Bergman and Anna Magnani.
