= Mussolinia =

Mussolinia is the former name of two planned communities in Italy which were named in honor of the Italian fascist dictator Benito Mussolini

- Mussolinia di Sicilia, the original name of Santo Pietro, a frazione in Caltagirone, Catania
- Mussolinia di Sardegna, the original name of Arborea, a comune in the province of Oristano

== See also ==
- Mussolini family
