= Fabrizio Ciano =

Grandson of Benito Mussolini

Fabrizio Ciano, 3rd Count of Cortellazzo and Buccari (1 October 1931 – 4 April 2008) was the son of Count Galeazzo Ciano and his wife Edda Mussolini, and grandson of Benito Mussolini. He was the author of the memoir Quando il nonno fece fucilare Papà (When Grandpa Had Daddy Shot). He married Beatriz Uzcategui Jahn, without issue.

Italian nobility
Preceded by Galeazzo Ciano	Count of Cortellazzo and Buccari; 1944–2008	Extinct
