= Marco Zeni =

Italian investigative journalist

Italian journalist Marco Zeni was the first to uncover the suppressed secret of Benito Mussolini's first marriage to Ida Dalser, in which the two had a son, Benito Albino Mussolini. His story was publicized through a documentary and two books, L'ultimo filò and La moglie di Mussolini.

== See also ==
- Benito Mussolini
- Ida Dalser
- Benito Albino Mussolini
