= Anna Maria Mussolini =

Italian radio presenter and Benito Mussolini's daughter (1929–1968)

- Born: Anna Maria Mussolini; 3 September 1929; Forlì, Romagna, Kingdom of Italy
- Died: 26 April 1968 (aged 38); Rome, Italy
- Spouse: Giuseppe Negri (m. 1960)
- Children: 2
- Parents: Benito Mussolini (father); Rachele Mussolini (mother)
- Family: Mussolini family

Anna Maria Mussolini (3 September 1929 – 25 April 1968) was an Italian radio presenter. She was the fifth child of Benito Mussolini and Rachele Guidi.

== Biography ==
Anna Maria Mussolini was the last-born child of Benito Mussolini and Rachele Mussolini, born on September 3, 1929, at Villa Carpena in Forlì. Her early years were marked by tragedy when she was afflicted with severe polio at the age of seven, causing permanent disabilities and deeply affecting her father. Raised in the opulence of Villa Torlonia in Rome, her family's primary residence, her childhood took a tumultuous turn with her father's arrest in 1943, leading to confinement with her mother and brother Romano at Rocca delle Caminate.

In the aftermath of Mussolini's fall from power, Anna Maria, alongside her mother and brother, attempted to flee to Switzerland in April 1945 but was turned back at the Chiasso border. Their subsequent journey, marked by temporary refuge in Como and eventual arrest by the National Liberation Committee, ended in internment at various locations before exile on the Island of Ischia.

Post-war, Anna Maria distanced herself from politics and embarked on a career in radio broadcasting at RAI in the 1960s. Using her husband's surname, she hosted a popular radio program, "Rotocalco musicale," showcasing notable personalities from the entertainment and music worlds. However, her anonymity was shattered when her true identity was revealed, leading to controversy and dismissal from her position.

Later, Anna Maria met presenter Giuseppe Negri (known as "Nando Pucci") in Cortina D'Ampezzo on New Year's Eve between 1959 and 1960. They married on June 11, 1960, and had two daughters named Silvia (1961) and Edda Negri Mussolini (1963), the latter later serving as mayor of Gemmano from 2009 to 2012.

Anna Maria faced health challenges in later years, undergoing surgery for breast cancer in 1966 and died of complications from chickenpox and endocarditis on April 25, 1968, at the age of 38.

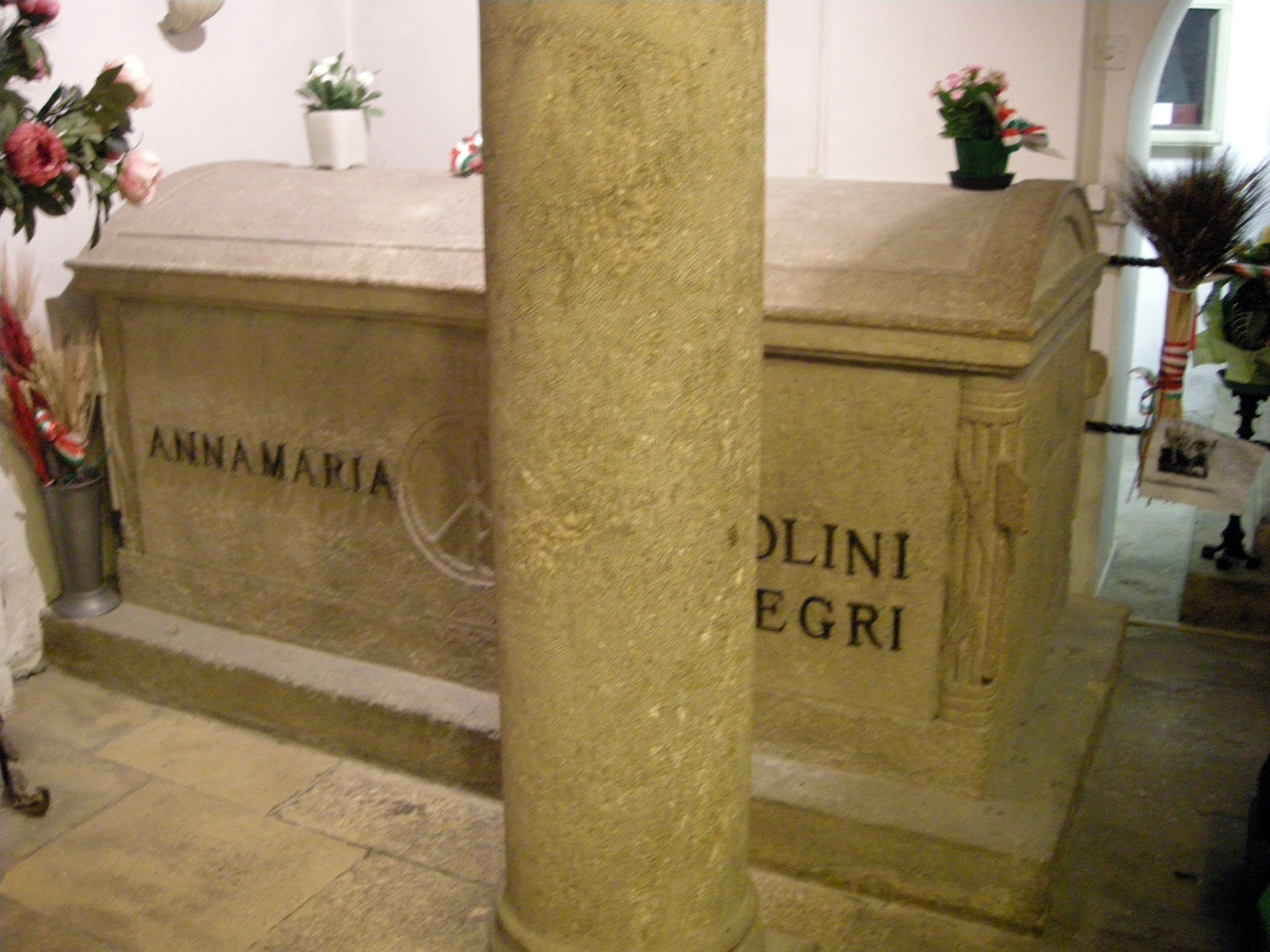
The tomb of Anna Maria Mussolini in the cemetery of Predappio

She was buried alongside her father and siblings in the crypt of the Predappio cemetery. In 2008, her childhood writings and personal diary (dated 1942) were published, offering insight into her early life.

== Bibliography ==
- Mussolini, Vittorio [in Italian] (1973). Mussolini: the tragic women in his life. New York: Dial Press.
- Silvagni (2010). Rubbettino (ed.). Anna Maria Mussolini. ISBN 978-8842537465.
- Spinosa (1983). Rizzoli Editore (ed.). I figli del Duce. ISBN 9788817115193.
- Baratter, Lorenzo [in Italian] (2008). Mursia (ed.). Anna Maria Mussolini: L'ultima figlia del Duce. ISBN 9788842537465.
