= Vittorio Mussolini =

Italian film producer (1916–1997)

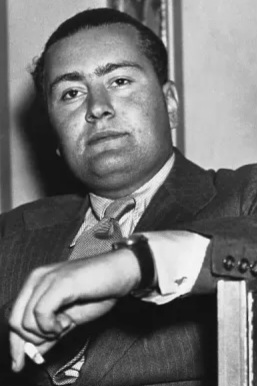
- Mussolini in 1936
- Born: 27 September 1916; Milan, Kingdom of Italy
- Died: 13 June 1997 (aged 80); Rome, Italy
- Occupations: film critic, producer
- Height: 1.75 m (5 ft 9 in)
- Spouse: Orsola Buvoli (m. 1937)
- Relatives: Edda Mussolini (sister); Romano Mussolini (brother); Bruno Mussolini (brother); Benito Mussolini (father); Rachele Mussolini (mother)

Vittorio Mussolini (27 September 1916 – 12 June 1997) was an Italian film critic and producer. He was also the second child of fascist dictator Benito Mussolini. However, he was the first officially acknowledged son of Mussolini, with his second wife Rachele; his older half-brother, Benito Albino Dalser, was never officially acknowledged by Mussolini's fascist regime.

== Biography ==
Vittorio Mussolini was born in Milan, Lombardy, Kingdom of Italy (Regno d'Italia). He married Milanese Orsola Buvoli (1914–2009), two years his senior. In January 1938, Mussolini and his wife announced the birth of their first child, a son, Guido, born in Rome.

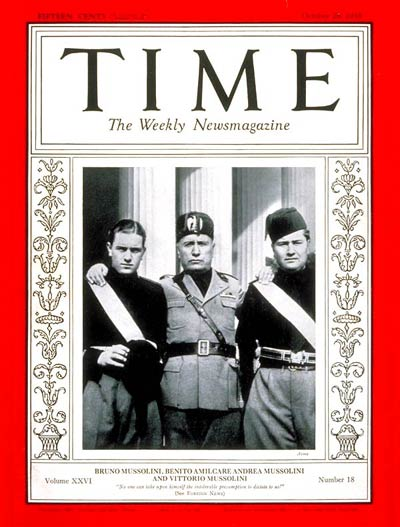
Vittorio (right), with his father and brother Bruno, on the cover of Time, 28 October 1935.

Mussolini served as a Lieutenant (Tenente) in the Italian Royal Air Force (Regia Aeronautica). He participated in the Second Italo-Ethiopian War, the Spanish Civil War, and World War II. In Ethiopia, both he and his younger brother Bruno crewed bombers. Unlike his brother, Vittorio was not considered a serious pilot and described bombing masses of Ethiopian civilians as "a rose opening up" and killing as "exceptionally good fun".

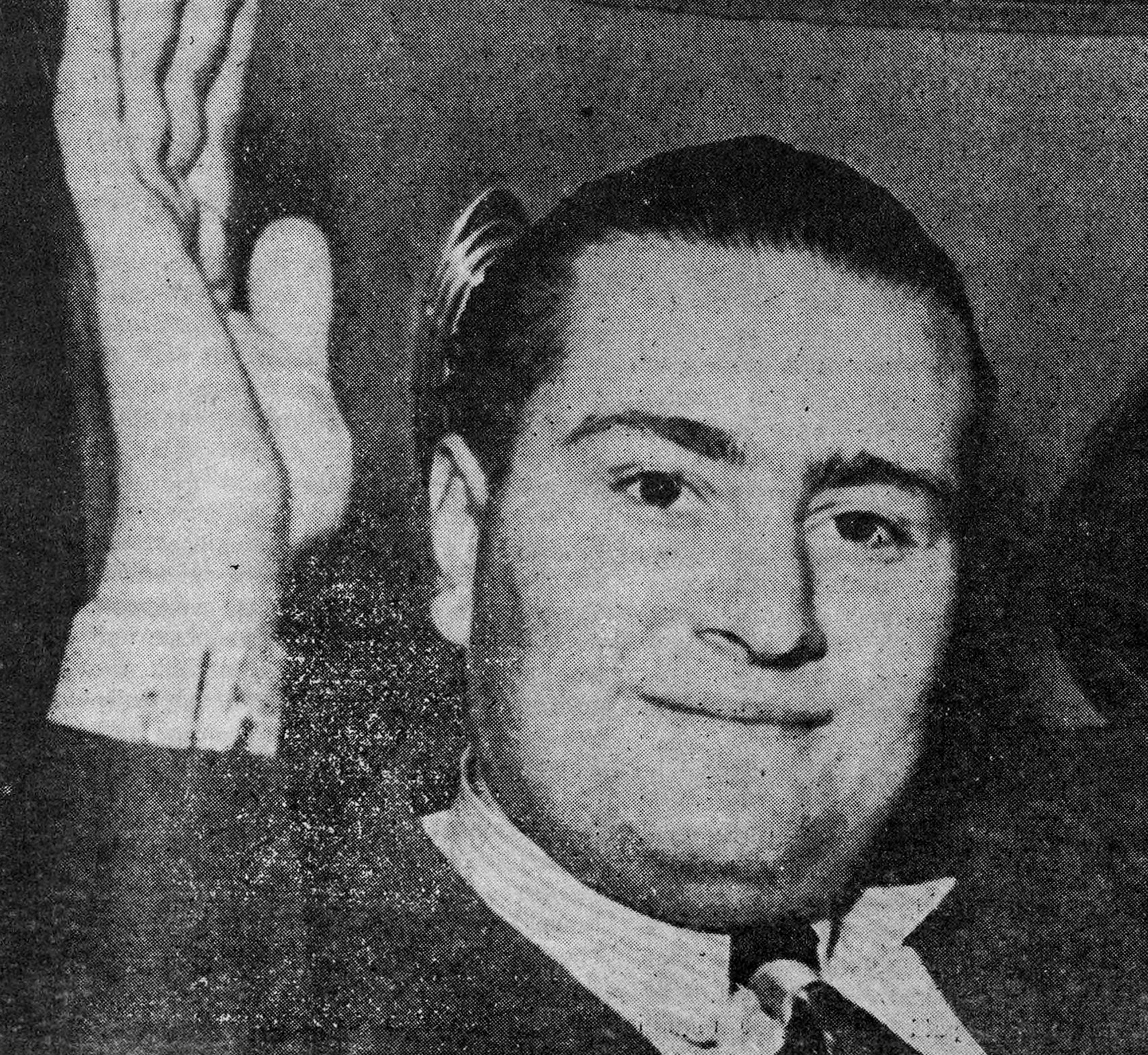
Mussolini visits the United States, 1937

In 1937, Vittorio was briefly involved with Hal Roach in a company, R.A.M. Pictures ("Roach and Mussolini"), but Roach bought himself out of the deal after being heavily ostracized in Hollywood.

In later years, Vittorio made much of his contact and friendship with left-wing and Jewish directors, writers, and film critics during the brief period in the late 1930s and early 1940s, when he edited the journal Cinema. Openly leftist critics such as Michelangelo Antonioni were published in the magazine, and Vittorio even found lodgings for the distinguished German Jewish critic Rudolf Arnheim in the Roman Mussolini residence, Villa Torlonia; with another Jewish friend, Orlando Piperno, Vittorio took part in the Mille Miglia car race, finishing tenth.

Mussolini worked with many of Italy's best film directors, such as Federico Fellini, Roberto Rossellini, and Michelangelo Antonioni.

He was the editor of the film journal Cinema and was involved with the Italian film studio Cinecittà.

Following the war, Mussolini emigrated to Argentina, but later returned to Italy.

Vittorio Mussolini died on 12 June 1997, at age 80, in a Rome clinic after a long illness.

== Publications ==
Mussolini was the author of a 1973 book on the women in his father's life entitled Mussolini: The Tragic Women in His Life.

== Filmography ==
Year	Title	Notes
1937	Scipio Africanus	Producer, Film debut
1942	A Pilot Returns	Writer
1942	The Three Pilots	Writer
1942	Luisa Sanfelice	Writer
1942	Knights of the Desert	Writer, Final film

== See also ==
- Ida Dalser, the mother of Vittorio Mussolini's older half brother
