= Edda Mussolini =

Benito Mussolini's daughter (1910–1995)

Edda Ciano
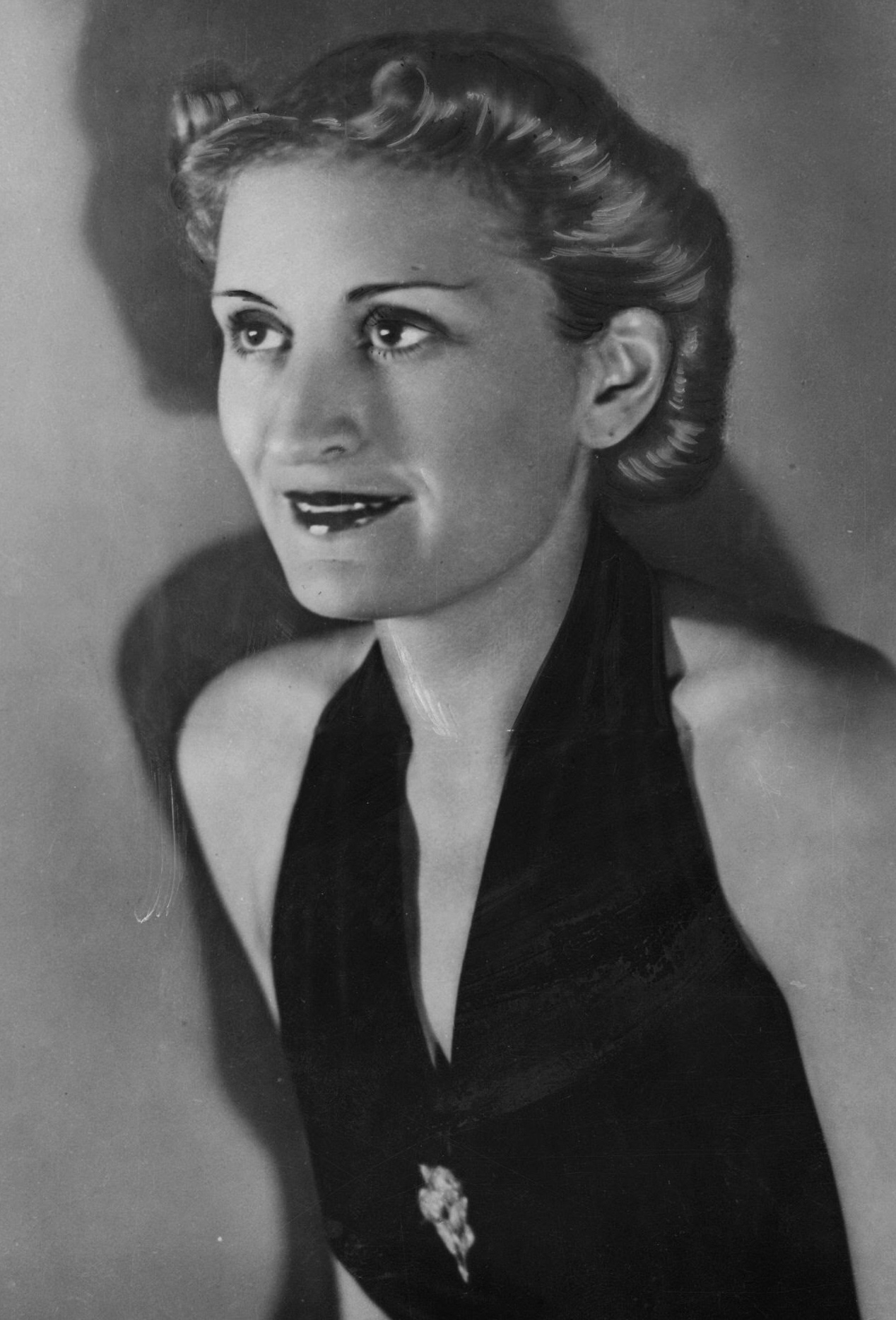
- Born: Edda Mussolini; 1 September 1910; Forlì, Romagna, Kingdom of Italy
- Died: 9 April 1995 (aged 84); Rome, Italy
- Title: Countess of Cortellazzo and Buccari
- Spouse: Galeazzo Ciano (m. 1930; died 1944)
- Children: 3
- Parents: Benito Mussolini (father); Rachele Guidi (mother)

Edda Ciano, Countess of Cortellazzo and Buccari (née Mussolini; 1 September 1910 – 9 April 1995) was the daughter of Benito Mussolini, fascist dictator of Italy from 1922 to 1943. Her husband, the fascist propagandist and Foreign Minister Galeazzo Ciano, was executed in January 1944 for his role in Mussolini's ousting. She strongly denied her involvement in the National Fascist Party regime following her father's execution by the Italian partisans in April 1945.

== Biography ==
=== Early life ===
The first child of Benito Mussolini and Rachele Guidi, she was born out of wedlock in Forlì, Romagna; her parents did not marry until December 1915. In her early years, while her father was editor of Il Popolo d'Italia in Milan, Edda lived with Rachele in Forlì. Her father became Prime Minister of Italy in October 1922 and dictator after January 1925.

In March 1925, Rachele and Edda with her brothers and sisters, moved from Milan to Carpegna and then to Rome in November 1929 to live with their father. Edda was a rebellious woman in her youth. Her powerful father made dating difficult, as most young men feared her. She has been described as being opinionated and outspoken. It was while in Rome that she met Galeazzo Ciano, son of Admiral Count Costanzo Ciano, a loyal Fascist and supporter of Benito Mussolini before his March on Rome. They were married on 24 April 1930 in a lavish ceremony attended by 4,000 guests.

Her husband was appointed Italian Consul in Shanghai. The couple moved back to Italy in 1932, where Galeazzo took the post of Minister of Foreign Affairs. In China, she had an affair with the Chinese general Zhang Xueliang.

=== Second World War ===
After the Italian invasion of Albania in June 1939, the city of Santi Quaranta (Sarandë in Albanian) was renamed "Porto Edda."

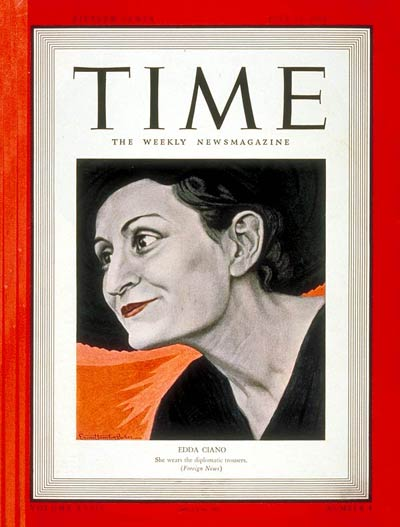
An illustration of Edda on the cover of Time, 24 July 1939.

In July 1939, she was depicted on the cover of Time in a feature entitled "Lady of the Axis".

During the Greco-Italian War, Edda Ciano volunteered for service with the Italian Red Cross. On 14 March 1941, she was embarked near the Albanian port of Valona (now Vlorë) on the Lloyd Triestino liner Po, which had been converted into a hospital ship. British planes attacked and sank the ship, with some loss of life. The ship was moored among other vessels with her lights switched off on the orders of the port authorities and was, therefore, a legitimate target and would not have been easily identifiable as a hospital ship. Edda managed to survive, being picked up from the water by another ship. She continued to work for the Red Cross until 1943.

It is rumored that Heinrich Himmler bestowed Edda the rank of an honorary SS leader (SS Ehrenführerin) in 1943.

After Edda's close call in the Adriatic Sea, Rachele and Benito Mussolini were doubly distressed when her brother, Bruno, died in August of the same year.

=== Execution of Ciano and escape to Switzerland ===
In July 1943, when internal opposition against Mussolini finally emerged in the Fascist Grand Council, Galeazzo Ciano voted against his father-in-law. For this act, he was arrested for treason in November 1943, tried, and then executed on 11 January 1944.

Edda Ciano escaped to Switzerland on 9 January 1944, disguised as a peasant woman. She managed to smuggle out the Count's wartime diaries, which had been hidden in her clothing by her confidant Emilio Pucci. At that time he was a lieutenant in the Italian Air Force but later found fame as a fashion designer. War correspondent Paul Ghali of the Chicago Daily News learned of her secret internment in a Swiss convent in Neggio and arranged the publication of the diaries. They reveal much of the secret history of the Fascist regime between 1939 and 1943 and are considered a prime historical source. The diaries are strictly political and contain little of the Cianos' personal lives.

=== After the war ===
After returning to Italy from Switzerland, Edda was arrested and held in detention on the island of Lipari. On 20 December 1945, she was sentenced to two years' imprisonment for aiding Fascism. Marcello Sorgi's book, Edda Ciano e il comunista (2009), concerns her time on Lipari and her relationship with a young communist who also lived there; this was the basis of a 2011 film starring Stefania Rocca.

Her autobiography, La mia vita, was published in translation as My Truth by Weidenfeld & Nicolson in 1975.

At the age of 84, she died in Rome in 1995.

== Legacy ==
At the time, it was widely reported that the daughter of Hermann Göring and Emmy Göring (born on 2 June 1938) was named Edda Göring after her.

Films depicting Edda include The Verona Trial (1963), starring Silvana Mangano, and Mussolini and I (1985) in which she was played by Susan Sarandon. In the TV-series Mussolini: The Untold Story (1985), Mary Elizabeth Mastrantonio played Edda. The Verona Trial, about Ciano's death sentence, was banned in Venice after the widowed countess lodged a complaint with the prefect, saying that the film was inaccurate and "treads on our sorrow".

Her son Fabrizio Ciano wrote a personal memoir titled Quando il nonno fece fucilare papà (When Grandpa Had Daddy Shot).

== Honors ==
- Silver Medal of Military Valor

== Sources ==
- Bosworth, R.J.B. (2002). Mussolini, Hodder Arnold ISBN 0-340-73144-3
- Ciano, Fabrizio (1991). Quando il nonno fece fucilare papà (When Grandpa Had Daddy Shot). Milan: Mondadori.
- Ciano, Galeazzo (1948). Ciano's Diplomatic Papers: being a record of nearly 200 conversations held during the years 1936-42 with Hitler, Mussolini, Franco; together with important memoranda, letters, telegrams etc.; edited by Malcolm Muggeridge; translated by Stuart Hood. London: Odhams Press.
- Ciano, Galeazzo (2000). The Ciano Diaries 1939-1943: The Complete, Unabridged Diaries of Count Galeazzo Ciano, Italian Minister of Foreign Affairs, 1936-1943 ISBN 1-931313-74-1
- Чиано Галеаццо, Дневник фашиста. 1939-1943, (Москва: Издательство "Плацъ", Серия "Первоисточники новейшей истории", 2010, 676 стр.) ISBN 978-5-903514-02-1
- Guerri, Giordano Bruno (2005). Un amore fascista. Benito, Edda e Galeazzo. Mondadori ISBN 88-04-53467-2
- Malaparte, Curzio, Kaputt: After he wrote Coup d'État: The Technique of Revolution, Malaparte was jailed by the fascist regime. He was freed on the personal intervention of Count Galeazzo Ciano. In Kaputt Malaparte refers to Count Ciano and his wife Edda. Like Edda Ciano, Malaparte spent time in forced exile on the island of Lipari.
- Moorehead, Caroline (2022). Mussolini's Daughter: The Most Dangerous Woman in Europe. Harper. ISBN 0-062-96725-8.
- Moseley, Ray (1999). Mussolini's Shadow: The Double Life of Count Galeazzo Ciano. Yale University Press ISBN 0-300-07917-6
- Mussolini, Rachele (1974). Mussolini: An Intimate Biography by His Widow (as told to Albert Zarca). New York: William Morrow. pp. 291. ISBN 0-688-00266-8.
- Ridley, Jasper (1997). Mussolini. St. Martin's Press.
- Salter, Michael, and Lorie Charlesworth, "Ribbentrop and the Ciano Diaries at the Nuremberg Trial" in Journal of International Criminal Justice 2006 4(1):103-127 doi:10.1093/jicj/mqi095
- Uglow, Jenny (23 March 2023). "Fascism's Poster Girl". The New York Review of Books.

Awards and achievements
Preceded by Sonja Henie	Cover of Time; 24 July 1939	Succeeded by Wendell L. Willkie
