= Alessandro Mussolini =

Father of Benito Mussolini (1854–1910)

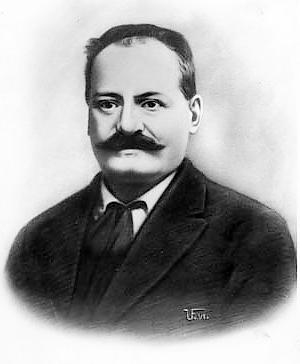
- Born: 11 November 1854; Montemaggiore di Predappio, Papal States
- Died: 19 November 1910 (aged 56); Forlì, Italy
- Occupation: Blacksmith
- Spouse: Rosa Maltoni (m. 1882; died 1905)
- Partner: Anna Lombardi (1905—)
- Children: Benito; Arnaldo; Edvige
- Family: Mussolini family

Alessandro Mussolini (11 November 1854 – 19 November 1910) was an Italian socialist activist who was the father of Benito Mussolini, the founder and leader of Italian fascism. Mussolini was a blacksmith by profession. He was married to Rosa Maltoni, a schoolteacher, with whom he had three children, including Benito. He exercised considerable influence over his son Benito's early political beliefs, even naming his son Benito Amilcare Andrea Mussolini after three leaders he admired: Benito Juárez, Amilcare Cipriani and Andrea Costa.

== Personal life ==
On 25 January 1882, Mussolini married Rosa Maltoni, a schoolteacher and Roman Catholic. Unlike his wife, Mussolini did not believe in God and hated the Roman Catholic Church. Maltoni's father looked down upon her decision to marry Mussolini and did not approve of the marriage.

In 1883, Maltoni gave birth to their first son, Benito Mussolini. Benito helped his father at the forge where Alessandro Mussolini worked as a blacksmith. Mussolini and his son Benito were close. He taught his son about revolutionary leaders he admired such as Karl Marx.

Mussolini experienced a number of personal troubles; he had difficulty in finding employment and became an alcoholic.

== Political activism and views ==
Mussolini entered politics in 1873 at the age of nineteen as a revolutionary socialist militant. In 1874, Mussolini took part in political disturbances in Predappio, Italy. Mussolini became a member of local government and was known by authorities for controversy and political violence against opponents. Mussolini was ill-tempered towards his opponents and in 1878, police warned Mussolini to cease threatening his opponents with the destruction of their property. He was arrested in 1878 on the suspicion of taking part in revolutionary activities and remained under house arrest until authorities released him in 1882 so that he could attend his marriage to Rosa Maltoni.

Mussolini believed that the government should control the mode of production and that working conditions needed to be improved, and supported the creation of a society run by the working-class.

Mussolini held Italian nationalist sentiments and idolized Italian nationalist figures with socialist or humanist tendencies such as Carlo Pisacane, Giuseppe Mazzini and Giuseppe Garibaldi. Alessandro Mussolini's political outlook combined the views of anarchist figures like Carlo Cafiero and Mikhail Bakunin, the military authoritarianism of Garibaldi, and the nationalism of Mazzini.
