= Galeazzo Ciano =

Italian diplomat and politician (1903–1944)

Count Galeazzo Ciano
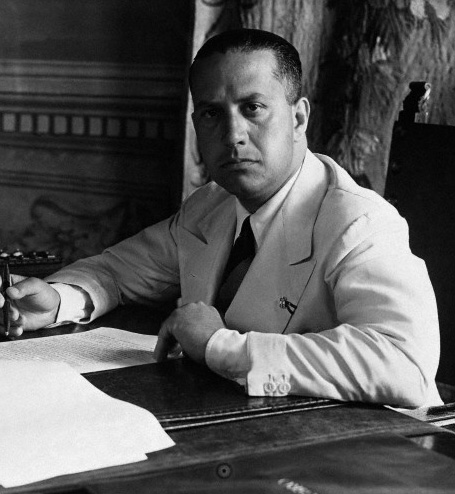
- Ciano in 1936

Ambassador of Italy to Vatican City
- In office 5 February 1943 – 25 July 1943
- Preceded by: Raffaele Guariglia
- Succeeded by: Francesco Babuscio Rizzo

Minister of Foreign Affairs
- In office 9 June 1936 – 6 February 1943
- Prime Minister: Benito Mussolini
- Preceded by: Benito Mussolini
- Succeeded by: Benito Mussolini

Minister of Press and Propaganda
- In office 23 June 1935 – 11 June 1936
- Prime Minister: Benito Mussolini
- Preceded by: Position established
- Succeeded by: Dino Alfieri

Member of the Chamber of Fasces and Corporations
- In office 23 March 1939 – 5 August 1943
- Appointed by: Benito Mussolini

Personal details
- Born: Gian Galeazzo Ciano; 18 March 1903 Livorno, Tuscany, Kingdom of Italy
- Died: 11 January 1944 (aged 40) Verona, Veneto, Italian Social Republic
- Cause of death: Execution by firing squad
- Party: National Fascist Party
- Height: 1.79 m (5 ft 10 in)
- Spouse: Edda Mussolini (m. 1930)
- Children: 3
- Parents: Costanzo Ciano (father); Carolina Pini (mother)
- Profession: Diplomat; politician
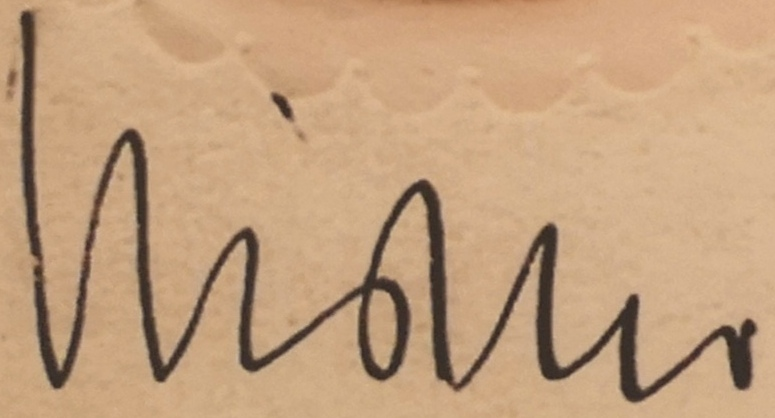
- Signature

Gian Galeazzo Ciano, 2nd Count of Cortellazzo and Buccari (/ˈtʃɑːnoʊ/ CHAH-noh, Italian: [ɡaleˈattso ˈtʃaːno]; 18 March 1903 – 11 January 1944), was an Italian diplomat and politician who served as Minister of Foreign Affairs of the Kingdom of Italy under the government of his father-in-law, Benito Mussolini, from 1936 until 1943. During this period, he was widely seen as Mussolini's most probable successor as head of government.

He was the son of Admiral Costanzo Ciano, a founding member of the National Fascist Party; father and son both took part in Mussolini's March on Rome in 1922. Ciano saw action in the Italo-Ethiopian War (1935–36) and was appointed Foreign Minister on his return. Following a series of Axis defeats in the Second World War, Ciano began pushing for Italy's exit, and he was dismissed from his post as a result. He then served as ambassador to the Vatican.

In July 1943, Ciano was among the members of the Grand Council of Fascism that forced Mussolini's ousting and subsequent arrest. Ciano proceeded to flee to Germany but was arrested and handed over to Mussolini's new regime based in Salò, the Italian Social Republic. Mussolini ordered Ciano's death, and in January 1944, he was executed by firing squad.

Ciano wrote and left behind a diary that has been used as a source by several historians, including Winston Churchill in his six-volume work The Second World War, William Shirer in his 1960 book The Rise and Fall of the Third Reich and in the four-hour HBO documentary-drama Mussolini and I (1985).

== Early life ==
Gian Galeazzo Ciano was born in Livorno, Italy, in 1903. He was the son of Costanzo Ciano and his wife Carolina Pini; his father was an Admiral and World War I hero in the Royal Italian Navy (for which service he was given the aristocratic title of Count by Victor Emmanuel III). The elder Ciano, nicknamed Ganascia ("The Jaw"), was a founding member of the National Fascist Party and re-organiser of the Italian merchant navy in the 1920s. Costanzo Ciano was not above extracting private profit from his public office.

He would use his influence to depress the stock of a company, after which he would buy a controlling interest, then increase his wealth after its value rebounded. Among other holdings, Costanzo Ciano owned a newspaper, farmland in Tuscany and other properties worth huge sums of money. As a result, his son Galeazzo was accustomed to living a high-profile and glamorous lifestyle, which he maintained almost until the end of his life. Father and son both took part in Mussolini's 1922 March on Rome.

After studying Philosophy of Law at the University of Rome, Galeazzo Ciano worked briefly as a journalist before choosing a diplomatic career; soon, he served as an attaché in Rio de Janeiro. According to Mrs. Milton E. Miles, in the 1920s in Beijing, Ciano met Wallis Simpson, later the Duchess of Windsor, had an affair with her, and left her pregnant, leading to a botched abortion that left her infertile. The rumour was later widespread but never substantiated, and Ciano's wife, Edda Mussolini, denied it.

On 24 April 1930, when he was 27 years old, Ciano married Benito Mussolini's daughter Edda Mussolini, and they had three children (Fabrizio, Raimonda and Marzio), though he was known to have had several affairs while married. Soon after their marriage, they left for China where he served as an attache at the Italian Legation in Beijing before serving as Italian consul in Shanghai.

== Political career ==
=== Minister of press and propaganda ===
On his return to Italy in 1935, Ciano became the minister of press and propaganda in the government of his father-in-law. He volunteered for action in the Italian invasion of Ethiopia (1935–36) as a bomber squadron commander. He received two silver medals of valour and reached the rank of captain. His future opponent Alessandro Pavolini served in the same squadron as a lieutenant.

=== Foreign minister ===
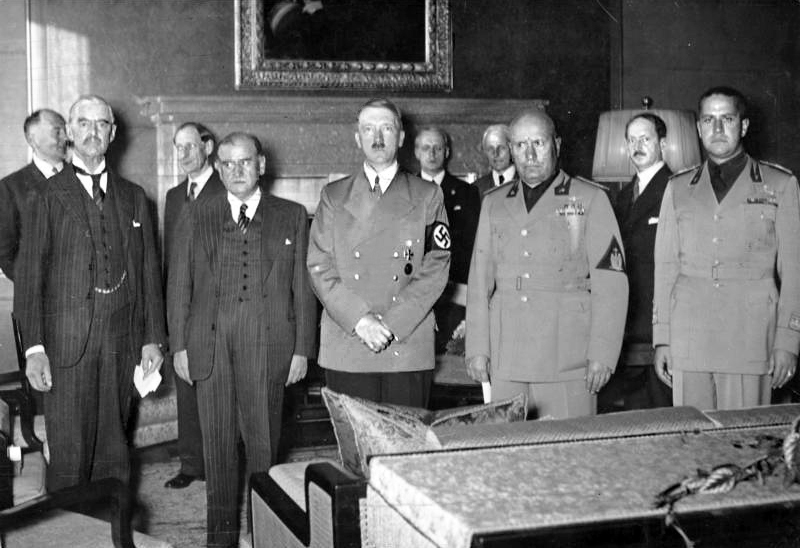
Ciano (far right) standing alongside (right to left) Benito Mussolini, Adolf Hitler, Édouard Daladier, and Neville Chamberlain prior to the signing of the Munich Agreement

Upon his highly trumpeted return from the war as a "hero" in 1936, he was appointed by Mussolini as the replacement Foreign Minister. Ciano began to keep a diary a short time after his appointment and kept it active up to his 1943 dismissal as foreign minister. In the autumn of 1936, he visited Germany, where Hitler suggested that Italy should rule the Mediterannean while Germany should expand to the east and control the Baltic. Both Ciano and Mussolini reacted positively to the proposal. In 1937, he was allegedly involved in planning the murder of the brothers Carlo and Nello Rosselli, two exiled anti-fascist activists killed in the French spa town of Bagnoles-de-l'Orne on 9 June. Also in 1937, prior to the Italian annexation in 1939, Ciano was named an Honorary Citizen of Tirana, Albania.

Before World War II, Mussolini may have been preparing Ciano to succeed him as Duce. After an abrupt decision by Mussolini, he negotiated Italy's formal alliance with Germany—the so-called Pact of Steel—in Berlin in May 1939. In early August 1939, when it became apparent that Germany was preparing to attack Poland imminently (despite earlier reassurances to the contrary), Mussolini sent Ciano to Germany to explain that Italy was not ready for a large-scale European war and to ask for two or three years before commencing hostilities. At the start of the war in September 1939, Ciano did not agree with Mussolini's plans and knew that Italy's armed forces were ill-prepared for a major war. When Mussolini formally declared war on France in 1940, he wrote in his diary, "I am sad, very sad. The adventure begins. May God help Italy!" Ciano became increasingly disenchanted with Nazi Germany and the course of World War II, although when the Italian regime embarked on an ill-advised "parallel war" alongside Germany, he went along, despite the terribly executed Italian invasion of Greece and its subsequent setbacks. Prior to the German campaign in France in 1940, Ciano leaked a warning of imminent invasion to neutral Belgium.

Throughout 1941 and thereafter, Ciano made derogatory and sarcastic comments about Mussolini behind his back and was surprised that these comments were reported to the Duce, who did not take them lightly; for his part, Ciano ignored well-meaning friends who advised moderation. On top of that, friends and acquaintances sought his protection and aid on various matters not having to do with his official position, which in turn resulted in further caustic remarks. In addition, two relatively minor incidents wounded his overblown self-importance and vanity. One was his being excluded from a projected meeting between Mussolini and Franco. The other involved him being reprimanded for a rowdy celebration of an aviator in Bari; he wrote a letter to Mussolini stating that the Duce had "opened a wound in him which can never be closed." His own self-worth seemed to cloud his judgement, forgetting that he had acquired his position by marrying Mussolini's daughter.

In late 1942 and early 1943, following the Axis defeat in North Africa, other major setbacks on the Eastern Front, and with an Anglo-American assault on Sicily looming, Ciano turned against the doomed war and actively pushed for Italy's exit from the conflict. He was silenced by being removed from his post as foreign minister. The rest of the cabinet was removed as well on 5 February 1943.

=== Ambassador to the Holy See ===
Ciano was offered the post of ambassador to the Holy See, and presented his credentials to Pope Pius XII on March 1, 1943. In this role, he remained in Rome, watched closely by Mussolini. The regime's position had become even more unstable by the coming summer, however, and court circles were already probing the Allied commands for some sort of agreement.

On the afternoon of 24 July 1943, Mussolini summoned the Fascist Grand Council to its first meeting since 1939, prompted by the Allied invasion of Sicily. At that meeting, Mussolini announced that the Germans were thinking of evacuating the south. This led Dino Grandi to launch a blistering attack on his longtime comrade. Grandi put on the table a resolution asking King Victor Emmanuel III to resume his full constitutional powers – in effect, a vote leading to Mussolini's ousting from leadership. The motion won by an unexpectedly large margin, 19–8, with Ciano voting in favour. Mussolini's replacement was Pietro Badoglio, an Italian general in both World Wars. Mussolini did not expect the vote to have substantive effect, and showed up for work the next morning as usual. That afternoon, the king summoned him to Villa Savoia and dismissed him from office. Upon leaving the villa, Mussolini was arrested.

== Exile, trial and death ==
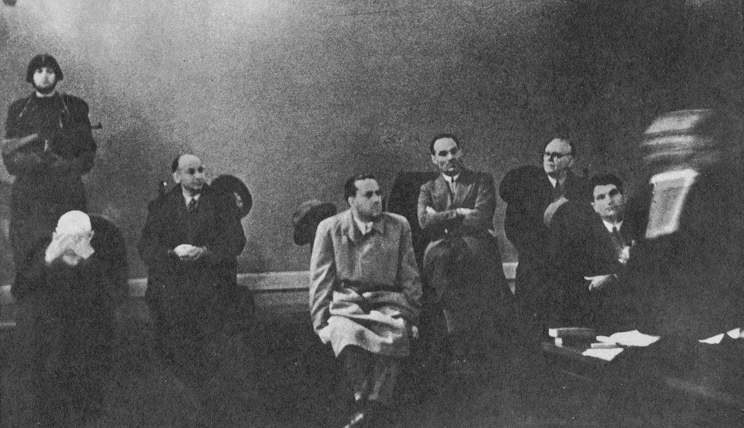
Ciano trial in Verona, 1944

Ciano was dismissed from his ambassador's post by the new government of Italy, put in place after his father-in-law was overthrown. Later, he and Edda were put under home arrest. Fearing further prosecution by the new Italian government, Ciano and Edda secretly turned to the Germans for help, and after covertly fleeing their villa with their three children on 27 August 1943, were evacuated on a German military plane from Ciampino airport to Munich.

After they were evacuated to Germany and placed in a secluded villa near Munich, Ciano and Edda applied for permission to be transferred to neutral Spain where they hoped to wait till the war's end. The application was denied, and as the Germans were furious at Ciano for his anti-Mussolini vote at the 24 July Fascist Grand Council meeting, they turned Ciano over to Mussolini's new government, the Italian Social Republic formed on 23 September, agreeing with Mussolini that Ciano would be viewed as a traitor. Ciano was then formally arrested on charges of treason. Under German and Fascist pressure, Mussolini kept Ciano imprisoned before he was tried at court and found guilty. After the Verona trial and sentence, on 11 January 1944, Ciano was executed by a firing squad along with four others (Emilio De Bono, Luciano Gottardi, Giovanni Marinelli and Carlo Pareschi) who had voted for Mussolini's ousting. As a further humiliation, the condemned men were tied to chairs and shot.

Ciano is remembered for his Diaries 1937–1943, a revealing daily record of his meetings with Mussolini, Hitler, Ribbentrop, foreign ambassadors and other political figures. Edda tried to barter his papers to the Germans in return for his life; Gestapo agents helped her confidant Emilio Pucci rescue some of them from Rome. Pucci was then a lieutenant in the Italian Air Force, but would find fame after the war as a fashion designer. When Hitler vetoed the plan, she hid the bulk of the papers at a clinic in Ramiola, near Medesano and on 9 January 1944, Pucci helped Edda escape to Switzerland with five diaries covering the war years which were then buried beneath a rose garden. The diary was first published in English in London in 1946, edited by Malcolm Muggeridge, covering 1939 to 1943. The complete English version was published in 2002.

== Children ==
Gian Galeazzo and Edda Ciano had three children:

- Fabrizio Ciano, 3rd Conte di Cortellazzo e Buccari (Shanghai, 1 October 1931 – San José, Costa Rica, 8 April 2008), married to Beatriz Uzcategui Jahn, without issue. Wrote a personal memoir entitled Quando il nonno fece fucilare papà (When Grandpa Had Daddy Shot).
- Raimonda Ciano (Rome, 12 December 1933 – Rome, 24 May 1998), married to Nobile Alessandro Giunta (born 1929), son of Nobile Francesco Giunta (Piero, 1887–1971) and wife (m. Rome, 1924) Zenaida del Gallo Marchesa di Roccagiovine (Rome, 1902 – São Paulo, Brazil, 1988)
- Marzio Ciano (Rome, 18 December 1937 – 11 April 1974), married Gloria Lucchesi

== In popular culture ==
- Several films have depicted Ciano's life, including The Verona Trial (1962) by Carlo Lizzani, where he is played by Frank Wolff and Mussolini and I (1985) in which he was played by Anthony Hopkins.
- In Serbia, there is a proverb: "Living like Count Ciano" – describing a flamboyant and luxurious life (Živi k'o grof Ćano/Живи к'о гроф Ћано).
- Ciano's diaries were published in 1946 and were used by the prosecution against Hitler's Foreign Minister, Joachim von Ribbentrop, during the post-war Nuremberg Trials.

Italian nobility
Preceded by Costanzo Ciano	Count of Cortellazzo and Buccari; 1939–1944	Succeeded by Fabrizio Ciano
Government offices
Preceded by Gaetano Polverelli	Head of the Government Press Office; 1933–1934	Succeeded by None (Office abolished); Himself as Undersecretary for Press and Propaganda
Preceded by None (Office established)	Undersecretary for Press and Propaganda; 1934–1935	Succeeded by None (Office abolished); Himself as Minister for Press and Propaganda
Preceded by None (Office established)	Minister of Press and Propaganda; 1935	Succeeded by Dino Alfieri
Preceded by Benito Mussolini	Minister of Foreign Affairs; 1936–1943	Succeeded by Benito Mussolini
