= Rachele Mussolini =

Wife of Benito Mussolini (1890–1979)

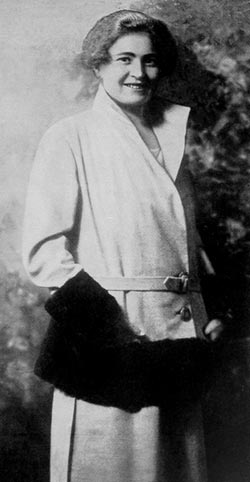
- Born: Rachele Guidi; 11 April 1890; Predappio, Italy
- Died: 30 October 1979 (aged 89); Forlì, Italy
- Spouse: Benito Mussolini (m. 1915; died 1945)
- Children: Edda; Vittorio; Bruno; Romano; Anna Maria

Rachele Mussolini (née Guidi; Italian: [raˈkɛːle ˈɡwiːdi]; 11 April 1890 – 30 October 1979), also known (particularly in Italy) as Donna Rachele ('Lady Rachel') was the second wife of dictator and fascist leader Benito Mussolini.

== Early life ==
Rachele Guidi was born in Predappio, Romagna, Kingdom of Italy. She was born into a peasant family and was the daughter of Agostino Guidi and wife Anna Lombardi. After the death of Rachele's father, her mother became the lover of the widowed Alessandro Mussolini.

== Relationship, marriage and children ==
In 1905 Benito's father, Alessandro Mussolini, had become a widower and opened a tavern in Forlì, on Giove Tonante Street, together with Rachele's mother (also a widow), entertaining an affair with her. Benito, meanwhile, having returned from Switzerland, moved after a couple of years to Forlì, to his father's place, and there he met Rachele again, thereupon commencing a romantic relationship with her. However, the families disagreed about their relationship, and so in 1909 Benito summoned his father and Rachele's mother and, wielding a revolver, told them that if they did not consent to their marriage, he would kill her and himself.

In 1910, Rachele Guidi moved in with Alessandro's son, Benito Mussolini, and gave birth to their daughter Edda in September that year. In 1914, Mussolini married his first wife, Ida Dalser. Although the records of that marriage were destroyed by Mussolini's government, an edict from the city of Milan ordering Mussolini to make maintenance payments to "his wife Ida Dalser" and their child was overlooked. Shortly before his son, Benito Albino Mussolini, was born to Ida Dalser, Rachele Guidi and Benito Mussolini were married in a civil ceremony in Treviglio, Lombardy, on 17 December 1915. In 1925, they renewed their vows in a religious service (after his rise to power).

Many sources agree that Rachele had a stern and authoritarian temperament, sometimes even more so than her husband: she was, for example, opposed to any act of clemency towards her son-in-law Galeazzo Ciano during the Verona trial and worsened, because of this, her relations with her daughter Edda, who called her "the real dictator of the house". Moreover, in the last months of 1943 she would go every night for two hours to talk with Guido Buffarini Guidi, minister of the interior of the Italian Social Republic, asking him for more severity in order to restore internal order.

== Children ==
Rachele and Benito Mussolini had two daughters and three sons:

1. Edda (1910–1995)
2. Vittorio (1916–1997)
3. Bruno (1918–1941)
4. Romano (1927–2006)
5. Anna Maria (1929–1968)

== Author ==
With Albert Zarca, she wrote a biography of her husband that was translated into English as Mussolini: An Intimate Biography.
