= Ida Dalser =

First wife of Benito Mussolini (1880–1937)

- Born: Ida Irene Dalser; 20 August 1880; Sopramonte, Tyrol, Austria-Hungary
- Died: 3 December 1937 (aged 57); Venice, Kingdom of Italy
- Spouse: Benito Mussolini (m. 1914; div. 1915)
- Children: Benito Albino Mussolini

Ida Irene Dalser (20 August 1880 – 3 December 1937) was the first wife of Italian fascist dictator Benito Mussolini.

== Early life ==
Ida Dalser was born in Sopramonte, a village near Trento (Trient), which was then within the borders of the County of Tyrol in the Austro-Hungarian Empire. The daughter of the town mayor, she was sent to Paris to study cosmetic medicine. When she returned, she moved to Milan, where she opened a French-style beauty salon.

== Marriage and motherhood ==
It is unclear whether Ida Dalser first met young Benito Mussolini in Trento, where he had found his first job as a journalist in 1909, or in Milan, where he had moved soon afterwards. The two started a relationship, and when Mussolini was refused work on the basis of his fervent socialist political activity, she financed him with the revenues of her beautician job. According to some sources, they married in 1914, and in 1915 she had a son, Benito Albino Mussolini. Though Fascist agents sought to erase all traces of the relationship, an edict from the city of Milan ordering Mussolini to make maintenance payments to "his wife Ida Dalser" and their child was overlooked.

== Persecution and death ==
In 1917, Mussolini came back from the war. His political career accelerated, and in 1919, he went on to found the Fasci italiani di combattimento. In 1921, it became the National Fascist Party, and in the same year, he was also elected to the Chamber of Deputies.

With the 1922 March on Rome, Mussolini seized power and became a dictator who was officially recognised by the reigning House of Savoy.

Once Mussolini was in power, Ida Dalser and her son were placed under surveillance by the police, and paper evidence of their relationship was tracked down to be destroyed by government agents. She persisted in continuing to claim her role as the dictator's wife and even publicly denounced Mussolini as a traitor. She said that during his years in Milan, he had accepted a bribe from the French government, in exchange for political campaigning in support of the involvement of neutral Italy in the war on the side of France.

However, her accusations were ignored, and fascist doctors had her committed to an asylum in Trento in 1926.

Eventually, she was transferred to the island of San Clemente in Venice, where she died in 1937. The cause of her death was officially given as a "brain hemorrhage".

== Fate of Benito Albino ==
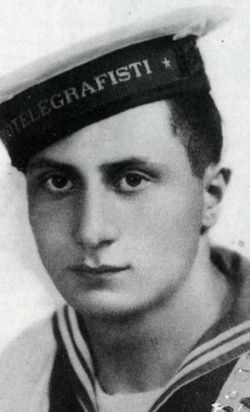
Benito Albino Dalser-Mussolini in the Italian Royal Navy, son of Italian fascist dictator Benito Mussolini

Benito Albino Mussolini was abducted by government agents and was told that his mother was dead. In 1931, he was adopted as an orphan at age 15 by the fascist ex-police chief of Sopramonte. Initially educated at a Barnabite college in Moncalieri, he enrolled in the Italian Royal Navy and always remained under close surveillance by the fascist government. Nevertheless, he persisted in stating that Benito Mussolini was his father and eventually, he was forcibly interned in an asylum in Mombello, Province of Milan, where he died on 26 August 1942 after he was repeatedly given coma-inducing injections of insulin, at the age of 26. Ida and Benito were officially described as "a danger to themselves and others" but hospital records show that both of them were lucid.

== In films ==
The story of Benito Mussolini's first marriage was suppressed during the fascist era and generally, it remained unknown for years afterward. In 2005, it was resurrected by the Italian journalist Marco Zeni and it was made public in a documentary, Mussolini’s Secret, which was broadcast on RAI state television as well as in two books (L'ultimo filò and La moglie di Mussolini).

Vincere, a biopic about Dalser's life, directed by Marco Bellocchio and starring Giovanna Mezzogiorno, was screened at the 2009 American Film Institute Festival and it was entered into the competition at the 2009 Cannes Film Festival.
