= Provinces of Italy =

Second-level administrative divisions of the Italian Republic

Provinces of Italy Province d'Italia (Italian)
- Category: Regionalised unitary state
- Location: Italian Republic
- Number: 110
- Populations: 81,415 (province of Isernia) – 4,231,451 (Metropolitan City of Rome Capital)
- Areas: 212.50 km^{2} (82.05 sq mi) (province of Trieste) – 7,397.86 km^{2} (2,856.33 sq mi) (South Tyrol)
- Government: Provincial Government (President of Province), Regional Government, National Government
- Subdivisions: Comuni

Provinces of Italy (grey borders), within Regions (solid borders)

The provinces of Italy (Italian: province d'Italia) are the second-level administrative divisions of the Italian Republic, on an intermediate level between a municipality (comune) and a region (regione). Since 2015, provinces have been classified as "institutional bodies of second level".

There are currently 110 institutional bodies of second level in Italy, including 82 ordinary provinces, 2 autonomous provinces, 4 regional decentralization entities, 6 free municipal consortia, and 15 metropolitan cities, as well as the Aosta Valley region (which also exercises the powers of a province).

Italian provinces (with the exception of the current Sardinian provinces) correspond to the NUTS 3 regions.

== Overview ==
A province of the Italian Republic is composed of many municipalities (comune). Usually several provinces together form a region; the region of Aosta Valley is the sole exception—it is not subdivided into provinces, and provincial functions are exercised by the region.

The three main functions devolved to provinces are:

- Local planning and zoning
- Provision of local police and fire services
- Transportation regulation (car registration, maintenance of local roads, etc.)

The number of provinces in Italy has been steadily growing in recent years, as many new ones are carved out of older ones. Usually, the province's name is the same as that of its capital city.

According to the 2014 reform, each province is headed by a President (or Commissioner) assisted by a legislative body, the Provincial Council, and an executive body, the Provincial Executive. President (Commissioner) and members of Council are elected together by mayors and city councilors of each municipality of the province. The Executive is chaired by the President (Commissioner) who appoint others members, called assessori. Since 2015, the President (Commissioner) and other members of the council will not receive a salary.

In each province, there is also a Prefect (prefetto), a representative of the central government who heads an agency called prefettura-ufficio territoriale del governo. The Questor (questore) is the head of State Police (Polizia di Stato) in the province and his office is called questura. There is also a provincial police force depending from local government, called provincial police (polizia provinciale).

Due to its size, the Aosta Valley region is not divided into provinces, but straight to the comune level.

South Tyrol and Trentino are autonomous provinces, unlike all other provinces they have the same legislative powers as regions and are not subordinated to Trentino-Alto Adige/Südtirol, the region they are part of.

== Type ==
Based on the most recent legislation, contained in the law of 7 April 2014 n. 56, the council and the presidents of the provinces of the regions with ordinary statute are elected by restricted suffrage by the mayors and councilors of the province's municipalities, while in the metropolitan cities, the equivalent of the president of the province is the (elective) mayor of the capital, called "metropolitan mayor".

There are other types of entities similar to the provinces in the regions with special statutes: the free municipal consortia in Sicily and the Sardinian provinces are governed by extraordinary commissioners appointed by the respective regional administrations, the autonomous provinces of Trentino-Alto Adige each elect its own president, and finally, in Aosta Valley, the functions of the province are carried out by the regional administration (whose president is elected by the regional council).

== List of provinces ==
=== List ===
Type	Province	Capital	Code	Region	Macroregion	Population (2026)	Area	Pop. density (p/km²)	Comuni	Established
F	Agrigento	Agrigento	AG	Sicily	Insular	407,041	3,052.82 km^{2} (1,178.70 sq mi)	133	43	1861
O	Alessandria	Alessandria	AL	Piedmont	North-West	408,063	3,558.78 km^{2} (1,374.05 sq mi)	115	187	1861
O	Ancona	Ancona	AN	Marche	Centre	461,613	1,963.21 km^{2} (758.00 sq mi)	235	47	1861
D	Aosta	Aosta	AO	Aosta Valley	North-West	122,554	3,260.85 km^{2} (1,259.02 sq mi)	38	74	1927
O	Arezzo	Arezzo	AR	Tuscany	Centre	333,269	3,232.99 km^{2} (1,248.26 sq mi)	103	36	1861
O	Ascoli Piceno	Ascoli Piceno	AP	Marche	Centre	200,202	1,228.19 km^{2} (474.21 sq mi)	163	33	1861
O	Asti	Asti	AT	Piedmont	North-West	207,059	1,510.17 km^{2} (583.08 sq mi)	137	117	1935
O	Avellino	Avellino	AV	Campania	South	393,093	2,805.96 km^{2} (1,083.39 sq mi)	140	118	1861
M	Bari	Bari	BA	Apulia	South	1,218,073	3,862.73 km^{2} (1,491.41 sq mi)	315	41	1861
O	Barletta-Andria-Trani	Barletta, Andria, Trani	BT	Apulia	South	375,933	1,542.93 km^{2} (595.73 sq mi)	244	10	2004
O	Belluno	Belluno	BL	Veneto	North-East	197,265	3,609.98 km^{2} (1,393.82 sq mi)	55	60	1866
O	Benevento	Benevento	BN	Campania	South	257,968	2,080.37 km^{2} (803.24 sq mi)	124	78	1861
O	Bergamo	Bergamo	BG	Lombardy	North-West	1,119,233	2,754.86 km^{2} (1,063.66 sq mi)	406	243	1861
O	Biella	Biella	BI	Piedmont	North-West	168,223	913.27 km^{2} (352.62 sq mi)	184	74	1992
M	Bologna	Bologna	BO	Emilia-Romagna	North-East	1,024,290	3,702.25 km^{2} (1,429.45 sq mi)	277	55	1861
O	Brescia	Brescia	BS	Lombardy	North-West	1,271,759	4,785.48 km^{2} (1,847.68 sq mi)	266	205	1861
O	Brindisi	Brindisi	BR	Apulia	South	373,631	1,861.33 km^{2} (718.66 sq mi)	201	20	1927
M	Cagliari	Cagliari	CA	Sardinia	Insular	534,219	4,311.47 km^{2} (1,664.67 sq mi)	124	70	1861
F	Caltanissetta	Caltanissetta	CL	Sicily	Insular	243,501	2,138.47 km^{2} (825.67 sq mi)	114	22	1861
O	Campobasso	Campobasso	CB	Molise	South	207,723	2,925.28 km^{2} (1,129.46 sq mi)	71	84	1861
O	Caserta	Caserta	CE	Campania	South	909,493	2,651.28 km^{2} (1,023.66 sq mi)	343	104	1861
M	Catania	Catania	CT	Sicily	Insular	1,067,550	3,573.51 km^{2} (1,379.74 sq mi)	299	58	1861
O	Catanzaro	Catanzaro	CZ	Calabria	South	338,160	2,415.41 km^{2} (932.60 sq mi)	140	80	1861
O	Chieti	Chieti	CH	Abruzzo	South	369,059	2,599.53 km^{2} (1,003.68 sq mi)	142	104	1861
O	Como	Como	CO	Lombardy	North-West	598,562	1,279.02 km^{2} (493.83 sq mi)	468	147	1861
O	Cosenza	Cosenza	CS	Calabria	South	667,134	6,709.62 km^{2} (2,590.60 sq mi)	99	150	1861
O	Cremona	Cremona	CR	Lombardy	North-West	355,134	1,770.41 km^{2} (683.56 sq mi)	201	113	1861
O	Crotone	Crotone	KR	Calabria	South	161,765	1,735.65 km^{2} (670.14 sq mi)	93	27	1992
O	Cuneo	Cuneo	CN	Piedmont	North-West	582,109	6,894.83 km^{2} (2,662.11 sq mi)	84	247	1861
F	Enna	Enna	EN	Sicily	Insular	151,525	2,574.67 km^{2} (994.09 sq mi)	59	20	1927
O	Fermo	Fermo	FM	Marche	Centre	166,772	862.75 km^{2} (333.11 sq mi)	193	40	2004
O	Ferrara	Ferrara	FE	Emilia-Romagna	North-East	340,482	2,627.38 km^{2} (1,014.44 sq mi)	130	21	1861
M	Florence	Florence	FI	Tuscany	Centre	988,494	3,513.65 km^{2} (1,356.63 sq mi)	281	41	1861
O	Foggia	Foggia	FG	Apulia	South	587,785	7,007.33 km^{2} (2,705.55 sq mi)	84	61	1861
O	Forlì-Cesena	Forlì	FC	Emilia-Romagna	North-East	394,337	2,378.32 km^{2} (918.27 sq mi)	166	30	1861
O	Frosinone	Frosinone	FR	Lazio	Centre	460,266	3,246.96 km^{2} (1,253.66 sq mi)	142	91	1927
O	Gallura North-East Sardinia	Olbia and Tempio Pausania		Sardinia	Insular	159,460	3,416.28 km^{2} (1,319.03 sq mi)	47	26	2025
M	Genoa	Genoa	GE	Liguria	North-West	820,691	1,833.75 km^{2} (708.01 sq mi)	447	67	1861
R	Gorizia	Gorizia	GO	Friuli-Venezia Giulia	North-East	138,717	475.40 km^{2} (183.55 sq mi)	292	25	1923
O	Grosseto	Grosseto	GR	Tuscany	Centre	214,863	4,503.17 km^{2} (1,738.68 sq mi)	48	28	1861
O	Imperia	Imperia	IM	Liguria	North-West	209,848	1,154.76 km^{2} (445.86 sq mi)	182	66	1861
O	Isernia	Isernia	IS	Molise	South	78,217	1,535.16 km^{2} (592.73 sq mi)	51	52	1970
O	L'Aquila	L'Aquila	AQ	Abruzzo	South	286,765	5,047.34 km^{2} (1,948.79 sq mi)	57	108	1861
O	La Spezia	La Spezia	SP	Liguria	North-West	214,539	881.38 km^{2} (340.30 sq mi)	243	32	1924
O	Latina	Latina	LT	Lazio	Centre	567,130	2,256.14 km^{2} (871.10 sq mi)	251	33	1934
O	Lecce	Lecce	LE	Apulia	South	761,927	2,798.88 km^{2} (1,080.65 sq mi)	272	96	1861
O	Lecco	Lecco	LC	Lombardy	North-West	334,211	805.60 km^{2} (311.04 sq mi)	415	84	1992
O	Livorno	Livorno	LI	Tuscany	Centre	324,893	1,213.52 km^{2} (468.54 sq mi)	267	19	1861
O	Lodi	Lodi	LO	Lombardy	North-West	231,481	782.97 km^{2} (302.31 sq mi)	296	60	1992
O	Lucca	Lucca	LU	Tuscany	Centre	379,957	1,774.04 km^{2} (684.96 sq mi)	214	33	1861
O	Macerata	Macerata	MC	Marche	Centre	301,689	2,779.31 km^{2} (1,073.10 sq mi)	109	55	1861
O	Mantua	Mantua	MN	Lombardy	North-West	408,715	2,341.35 km^{2} (904.00 sq mi)	175	64	1866
O	Massa-Carrara	Massa	MS	Tuscany	Centre	186,637	1,154.60 km^{2} (445.79 sq mi)	162	17	1861
O	Matera	Matera	MT	Basilicata	South	187,754	3,478.84 km^{2} (1,343.19 sq mi)	54	31	1927
O	Medio Campidano	Sanluri and Villacidro		Sardinia	Insular	89,155	1,517.77 km^{2} (586.01 sq mi)	59	28	2025
M	Messina	Messina	ME	Sicily	Insular	594,074	3,266.07 km^{2} (1,261.04 sq mi)	182	108	1861
M	Milan	Milan	MI	Lombardy	North-West	3,253,111	1,575.49 km^{2} (608.30 sq mi)	2,065	133	1861
O	Modena	Modena	MO	Emilia-Romagna	North-East	711,502	2,687.88 km^{2} (1,037.80 sq mi)	265	47	1861
O	Monza and Brianza	Monza	MB	Lombardy	North-West	883,396	405.41 km^{2} (156.53 sq mi)	2,179	55	2004
M	Naples	Naples	NA	Campania	South	2,954,847	1,178.94 km^{2} (455.19 sq mi)	2,504	92	1861
O	Novara	Novara	NO	Piedmont	North-West	365,930	1,340.25 km^{2} (517.47 sq mi)	273	87	1861
O	Nuoro	Nuoro	NU	Sardinia	Insular	142,241	3,991.36 km^{2} (1,541.07 sq mi)	36	53	1927
O	Ogliastra	Lanusei and Tortolì		Sardinia	Insular	53,722	1,855.58 km^{2} (716.44 sq mi)	29	23	2025
O	Oristano	Oristano	OR	Sardinia	Insular	146,785	2,990.41 km^{2} (1,154.60 sq mi)	49	87	1974
O	Padua	Padua	PD	Veneto	North-East	934,540	2,144.12 km^{2} (827.85 sq mi)	436	101	1866
M	Palermo	Palermo	PA	Sicily	Insular	1,195,307	5,009.21 km^{2} (1,934.07 sq mi)	239	82	1861
O	Parma	Parma	PR	Emilia-Romagna	North-East	457,509	3,447.40 km^{2} (1,331.05 sq mi)	133	44	1861
O	Pavia	Pavia	PV	Lombardy	North-West	546,023	2,968.59 km^{2} (1,146.18 sq mi)	184	184	1861
O	Perugia	Perugia	PG	Umbria	Centre	635,988	6,336.99 km^{2} (2,446.73 sq mi)	100	59	1861
O	Pesaro and Urbino	Pesaro	PU	Marche	Centre	349,556	2,511.20 km^{2} (969.58 sq mi)	139	50	1861
O	Pescara	Pescara	PE	Abruzzo	South	311,563	1,230.29 km^{2} (475.02 sq mi)	253	46	1927
O	Piacenza	Piacenza	PC	Emilia-Romagna	North-East	287,745	2,585.76 km^{2} (998.37 sq mi)	111	46	1861
O	Pisa	Pisa	PI	Tuscany	Centre	419,588	2,444.82 km^{2} (943.95 sq mi)	172	37	1861
O	Pistoia	Pistoia	PT	Tuscany	Centre	290,867	964.16 km^{2} (372.26 sq mi)	302	20	1927
R	Pordenone	Pordenone	PN	Friuli-Venezia Giulia	North-East	311,114	2,275.35 km^{2} (878.52 sq mi)	137	50	1968
O	Potenza	Potenza	PZ	Basilicata	South	337,527	6,594.28 km^{2} (2,546.07 sq mi)	51	100	1861
O	Prato	Prato	PO	Tuscany	Centre	261,152	365.66 km^{2} (141.18 sq mi)	714	7	1992
F	Ragusa	Ragusa	RG	Sicily	Insular	323,144	1,623.91 km^{2} (627.00 sq mi)	199	12	1927
O	Ravenna	Ravenna	RA	Emilia-Romagna	North-East	387,743	1,859.39 km^{2} (717.91 sq mi)	209	18	1861
M	Reggio Calabria	Reggio Calabria	RC	Calabria	South	510,590	3,210.31 km^{2} (1,239.51 sq mi)	159	97	1861
O	Reggio Emilia	Reggio Emilia	RE	Emilia-Romagna	North-East	532,157	2,291.15 km^{2} (884.62 sq mi)	232	42	1861
O	Rieti	Rieti	RI	Lazio	Centre	149,335	2,750.24 km^{2} (1,061.87 sq mi)	54	73	1927
O	Rimini	Rimini	RN	Emilia-Romagna	North-East	341,244	922.04 km^{2} (356.00 sq mi)	370	27	1992
M	Rome	Rome	RM	Lazio	Centre	4,224,901	5,363.22 km^{2} (2,070.75 sq mi)	787	121	1870
O	Rovigo	Rovigo	RO	Veneto	North-East	227,183	1,819.86 km^{2} (702.65 sq mi)	125	50	1866
O	Salerno	Salerno	SA	Campania	South	1,053,302	4,954.05 km^{2} (1,912.77 sq mi)	213	158	1861
M	Sassari	Sassari	SS	Sardinia	Insular	311,128	4,286.72 km^{2} (1,655.11 sq mi)	73	66	2025
O	Savona	Savona	SV	Liguria	North-West	266,910	1,546.27 km^{2} (597.02 sq mi)	173	69	1927
O	Siena	Siena	SI	Tuscany	Centre	259,502	3,820.81 km^{2} (1,475.22 sq mi)	68	35	1861
O	Sondrio	Sondrio	SO	Lombardy	North-West	179,268	3,195.68 km^{2} (1,233.86 sq mi)	56	77	1861
A	South Tyrol	Bolzano	BZ	Trentino-South Tyrol	North-East	542,134	7,397.86 km^{2} (2,856.33 sq mi)	73	116	1927
O	Sulcis Iglesiente	Carbonia and Iglesias		Sardinia	Insular	117,780	1,747.24 km^{2} (674.61 sq mi)	67	24	2025
F	Syracuse	Syracuse	SR	Sicily	Insular	382,450	2,124.19 km^{2} (820.15 sq mi)	180	21	1861
O	Taranto	Taranto	TA	Apulia	South	547,928	2,467.33 km^{2} (952.64 sq mi)	222	29	1924
O	Teramo	Teramo	TE	Abruzzo	South	299,835	1,954.34 km^{2} (754.57 sq mi)	153	47	1861
O	Terni	Terni	TR	Umbria	Centre	214,639	2,127.23 km^{2} (821.33 sq mi)	101	33	1927
F	Trapani	Trapani	TP	Sicily	Insular	410,602	2,469.70 km^{2} (953.56 sq mi)	166	25	1861
A	Trento	Trento	TN	Trentino-South Tyrol	North-East	548,684	6,206.87 km^{2} (2,396.49 sq mi)	88	166	1923
O	Treviso	Treviso	TV	Veneto	North-East	878,341	2,479.80 km^{2} (957.46 sq mi)	354	94	1866
R	Trieste	Trieste	TS	Friuli-Venezia Giulia	North-East	227,840	212.50 km^{2} (82.05 sq mi)	1,072	6	1923
M	Turin	Turin	TO	Piedmont	North-West	2,204,779	6,826.91 km^{2} (2,635.88 sq mi)	323	312	1861
R	Udine	Udine	UD	Friuli-Venezia Giulia	North-East	515,825	4,969.23 km^{2} (1,918.63 sq mi)	104	134	1866
O	Varese	Varese	VA	Lombardy	North-West	884,801	1,198.24 km^{2} (462.64 sq mi)	738	136	1927
M	Venice	Venice	VE	Veneto	North-East	834,077	2,472.88 km^{2} (954.78 sq mi)	337	44	1866
O	Verbano-Cusio-Ossola	Verbania	VB	Piedmont	North-West	152,677	2,260.89 km^{2} (872.93 sq mi)	68	74	1992
O	Vercelli	Vercelli	VC	Piedmont	North-West	166,166	2,081.60 km^{2} (803.71 sq mi)	80	82	1927
O	Verona	Verona	VR	Veneto	North-East	930,842	3,096.28 km^{2} (1,195.48 sq mi)	301	98	1866
O	Vibo Valentia	Vibo Valentia	VV	Calabria	South	149,922	1,150.62 km^{2} (444.26 sq mi)	130	50	1992
O	Vicenza	Vicenza	VI	Veneto	North-East	855,212	2,722.45 km^{2} (1,051.14 sq mi)	314	112	1866
O	Viterbo	Viterbo	VT	Lazio	Centre	307,812	3,615.16 km^{2} (1,395.82 sq mi)	85	60	1927
Total	Italy	—	—	—	—	58,942,828	302,068.26 km^{2} (116,629.21 sq mi)	195	7,894	—

=== Data ===
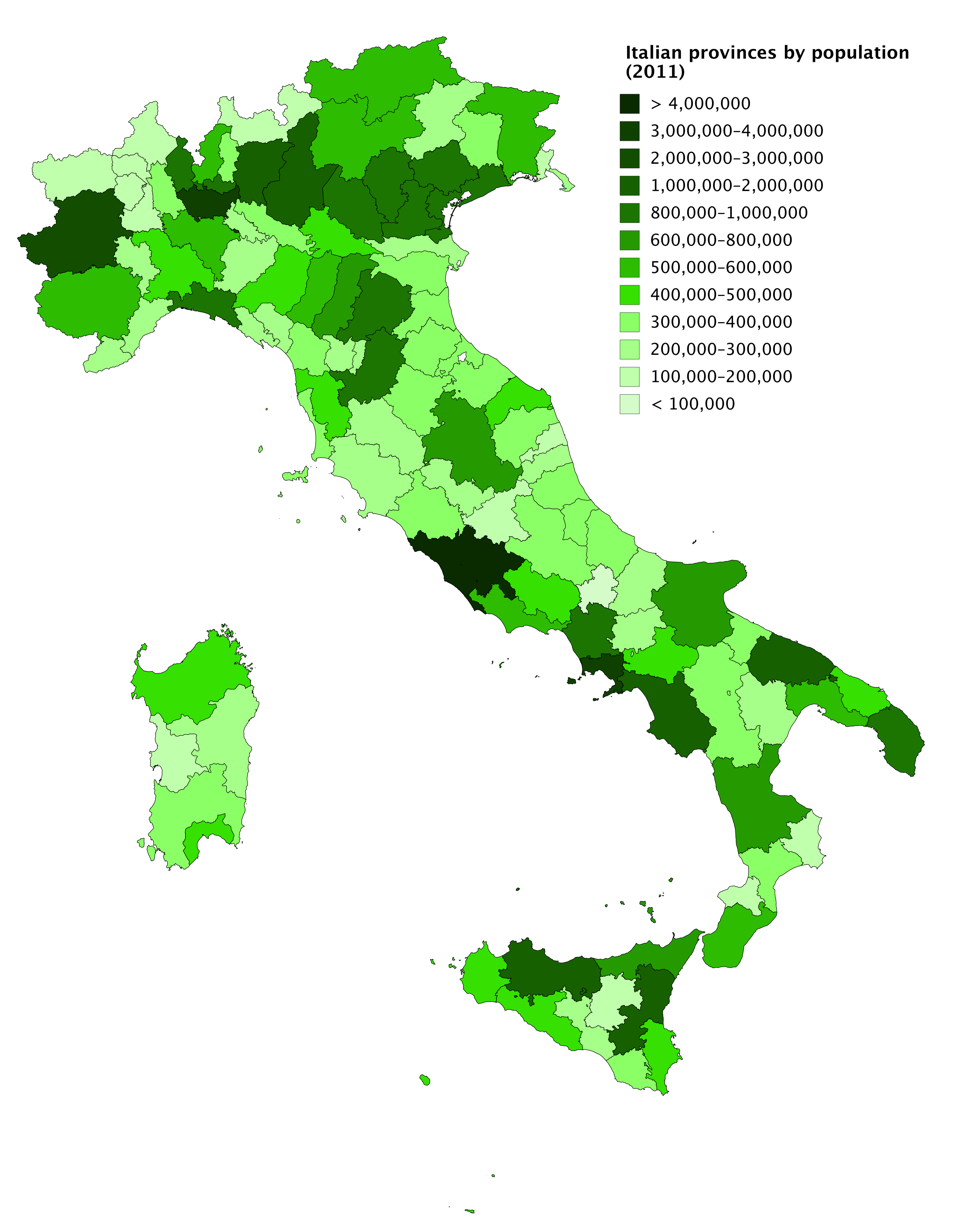
Italian provinces by population

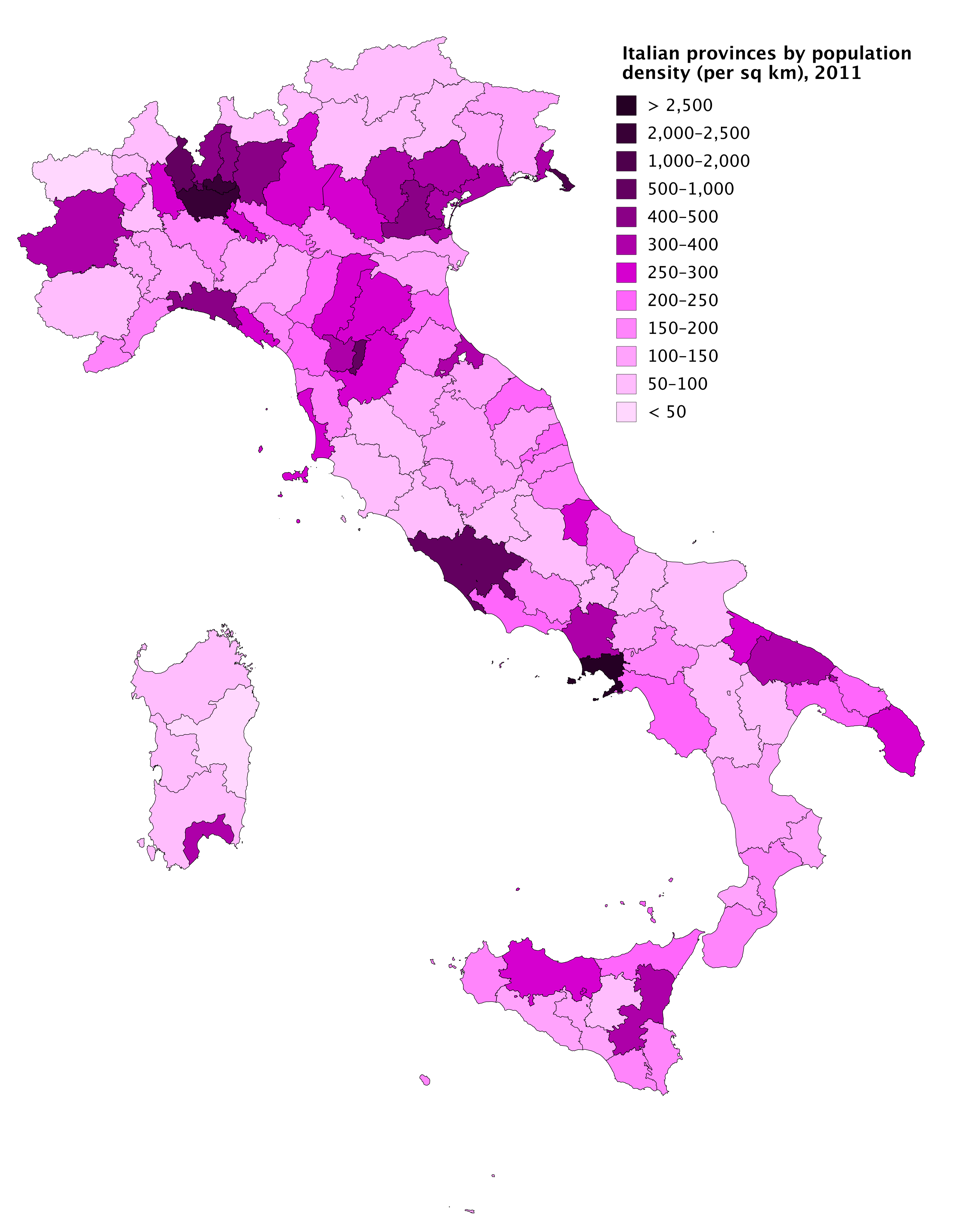
Italian provinces by population density

- Sardinia — following the outcome of the regional referendums of 2012 it was decreed that such institutions should be reformed or abolished by March 2013 (thus remaining in office until 28 February 2013). In January 2014 the Sardinian Regional Administrative Court declared "unconstitutional" the abolition of the Sardinian provinces, which occurred in 2013. In 2016, Sardinian provinces were reformed by Sardinia regional executive: Cagliari became a metropolitan city; the provinces Olbia-Tempio, Ogliastra, Medio Campidano, and Carbonia-Iglesias were abolished. In 2017, Regional council of Sardinia approved the institution of a new province, South Sardinia. It was formed by the municipalities of province of Cagliari that did not join to metropolitan city of Cagliari, and those which formed the provinces of Medio Campidano and Carbonia Iglesias. South Sardinia was disestablished on 1 June 2025 and the other reinstated, some with different names, and Sassari made a metropolitan city.
- Sicily — provinces were replaced by six free municipal consortia in 2013 and three metropolitan cities in 2015.
- Friuli-Venezia Giulia — in 2016, the regional council of Friuli-Venezia Giulia approved a law which abolished the four provinces that formed the region, and replaced them by 18 territorial unions of municipalities. In 2019, the regional council of Friuli-Venezia Giulia rebranded the four provinces as the four regional decentralization entities, with their own competences, powers, and capital.
- Metropolitan cities — in 2015, 14 metropolitan cities replaced the provinces of Bari, Bologna, Cagliari, Catania, Florence, Genoa, Messina, Milan, Naples, Palermo, Reggio Calabria, Rome, Turin, and Venice.

=== Maps ===
Abruzzo

Aosta Valley

Apulia

Basilicata

Calabria

Campania

Emilia-Romagna

Friuli-Venezia Giulia

Lazio

Liguria

Lombardy

Marche

Molise

Piedmont

Sardinia

Sicily

Tuscany

Trentino-Alto Adige/Südtirol

Umbria

Veneto

== History ==
=== National unification ===
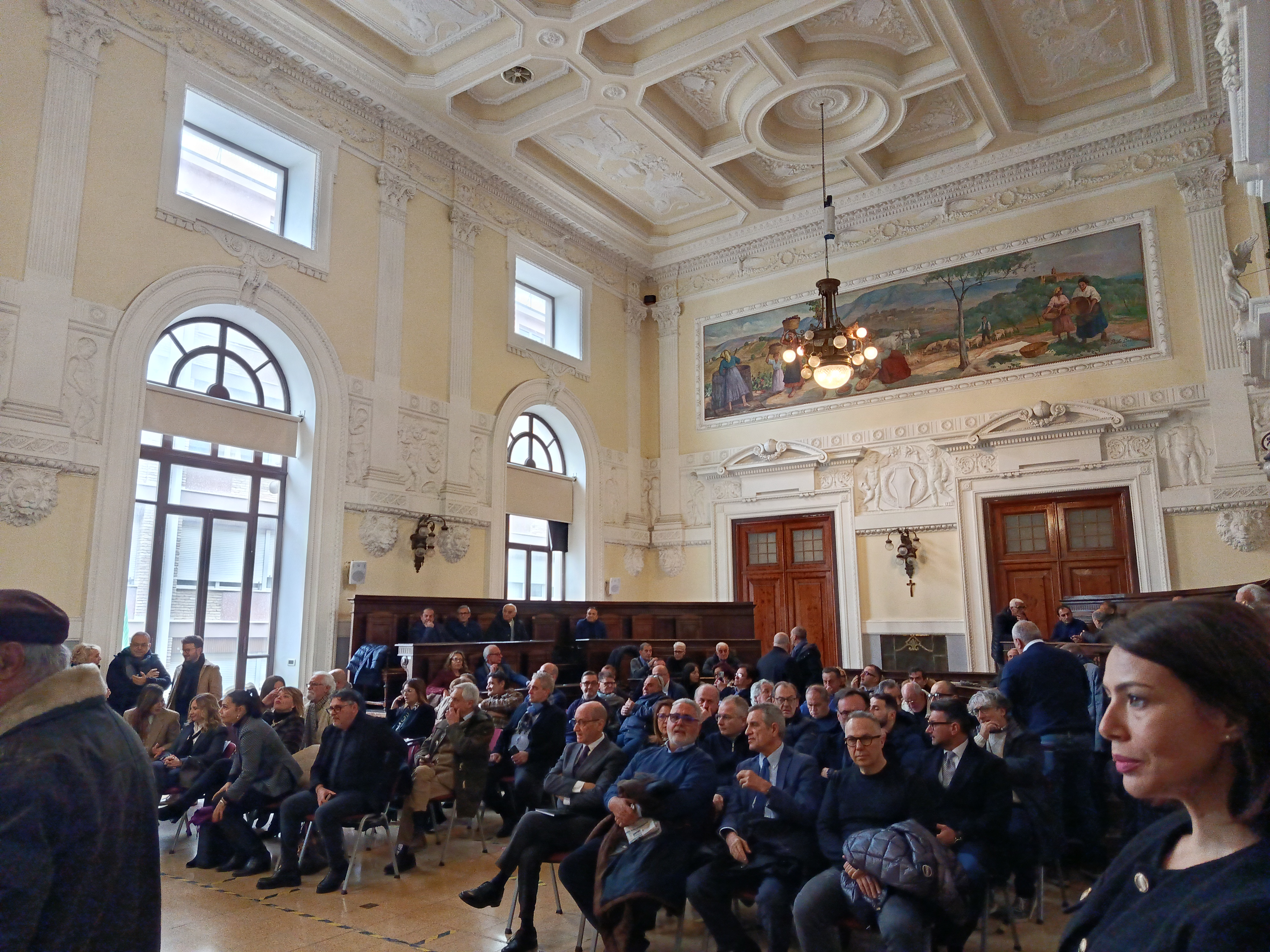
Council room of the Province of Chieti built in the first half of the 20th century in Neoclassical style

In 1861, at the birth of the Kingdom of Italy, there were 59 provinces. However, at that time the national territory was smaller than the current one: regions of Veneto, Friuli-Venezia Giulia, Trentino-Alto Adige/Südtirol, and Lazio were not included in the kingdom.

In 1866, following the Third Independence War, territories of Veneto, Friuli and Mantua were annexed. There were therefore nine more provinces: Belluno, Mantua, Padua, Rovigo, Treviso, Venice, Verona, Vicenza, and Udine, all previously part of the Austrian Empire. Eventually, in 1870, following the union of Rome and its province from the Papal States, the provinces rose in number to 69.

After the World War I, new territories were annexed to Italy. The province of Trento was created in 1923. Provinces of La Spezia and Trieste in 1923, while Ionio in 1924. In 1924 the new provinces of Fiume, Pola, and Zara were created, increasing the total number of provinces in Italy to 76.

=== Interwar period ===
Provinces of Italy in 1942 during World War II

In 1927, after a royal charter, (Note: Regio Decreto Legislativo n. 1/1927, 3 January 1927, "Riordinamento delle circoscrizioni provinciali") a general province rearrangement took place. 17 new provinces were created: Aosta, Vercelli, Varese, Savona, Bolzano, Gorizia, Pistoia, Pescara, Rieti, Terni, Viterbo, Frosinone, Brindisi, Matera, Ragusa, Castrogiovanni, Nuoro. In the same year, the province of Caserta was dissolved, Girgenti was renamed Agrigento, and the institution of circondari, sub-provincial wards created before the unification, was abolished.

In 1930 Spezia became La Spezia, while in 1931 Bari delle Puglie became Bari. Province of Littoria (Latina) was created in 1934, and the province of Asti in 1935. In 1939 the province of Aquila degli Abruzzi became the province of L'Aquila, and in 1940 the province of Friuli was renamed the province of Udine.

Following the annexation of a part of Yugoslavia in 1941, during the World War II, the province of Zara was enlarged and joined the Governorate of Dalmatia (comprising the province of Zara, and the new provinces of Spalato, and Cattaro), while in the occupied central part of the present-day Slovenia the new province of Ljubljana was created. This lasted only until 1945, when Yugoslavia regained the lost territories after the end of the World War II.

=== After World War II ===
In 1945, after the end of the World War II, the province of Aosta changed its name to Aosta Valley and Littoria to Latina; the new province of Caserta was recreated.

With the Paris Peace Treaties, signed on 10 February 1947, Italy lost the provinces of Fiume, Pola, and Zara, and part of the provinces of Trieste and Gorizia.

Moreover, the province of Trieste was occupied by United States and British forces. The Italian Republic therefore had 91 provinces at its birth. The province of Ionio was renamed as Taranto in 1951, and in 1954 the province of Trieste was returned to Italy.

=== Recent history ===
The province of Pordenone was created in 1968, the province of Isernia in 1970, and the province of Oristano in 1974. In a reorganization in 1992 eight provinces were created: Verbano-Cusio-Ossola, Biella, Lecco, Lodi, Rimini, Prato, Crotone, and Vibo Valentia, while Forlì was renamed as Forlì-Cesena.

Four new provinces were created in Sardinia in 2001, with effect from 2005: Olbia-Tempio, Ogliastra, Medio Campidano, and Carbonia-Iglesias. In 2004 three further provinces were created: Monza and Brianza, Fermo, and Barletta-Andria-Trani, making a total of 110 provinces.

Number of provinces
Year	Provinces
1861	59
1866	68
1870	69
1923	75
1924	76
1927	92
1934	93
1935	94
1941	95
1944	94
1945	93
1947	91
1954	92
1968	93
1970	94
1974	95
1992	103
2001	107
2004	110
2016	107

In May 2012, a referendum abolished the eight provinces of Sardinia, and this suppression was to take effect on 1 March 2013. On 6 July 2012, new plans were published to reduce the number of provinces by around half. In January 2014 the Sardinian Regional Administrative Court declared "unconstitutional" the abolition of the Sardinian provinces.

In 2014 the Delrio Law transformed the provinces of Italy in a reduced number of broader administrative entities.

In 2014 the Friuli-Venezia Giulia of Debora Serracchiani was the first Italian region to pass a law for abolishing its provinces, while implementing the national reform in the local administrative level. The Friuli region has multiplied four provinces in 18 unions of the Italian administrative unit called comune. After rejection of the 2016 Italian constitutional referendum, the provinces of Italy were still kept alive under provisions of the Delrio Constitutional Law to be merged in a smaller number of union of provinces.

== Former provinces ==
=== Historical abolished provinces ===
- Province of Aosta (Italian: provincia di Aosta) (1927–1945). Became the Autonomous Region of Aosta Valley in 1948.
- Province of Terra di Lavoro (Italian: provincia di Terra di Lavoro) (1861–1927). It was divided into the current provinces of Frosinone, Latina, and Caserta.

=== Provinces of Istria, Kvarner, and Dalmatia ===
- Province of Zara (Italian: provincia di Zara) (1923–1947). Created after World War I in Dalmatia. Originally a small territory, it was greatly enlarged in 1941 during World War II. It was a part of the Governorship of Dalmatia. It remained nominally a part of the Italian Social Republic after the Italian capitulation.
- Province of Pola (Italian: provincia di Pola) (1923–1947). Created after World War I in Istria. It was occupied by Germany in September 1943 and it was administered as a part of the German Operational Zone of the Adriatic Littoral.
- Province of Fiume (Italian: provincia di Fiume) (1924–1947). Created after World War I in Kvarner. Enlarged during World War II. It was occupied by Germany in September 1943 and it was administered as a part of the German Operational Zone of the Adriatic Littoral.

=== Provinces established during World War II ===
- Province of Ljubljana (Italian: provincia di Lubiana) (1941–1943). Created during World War II. It was occupied by Germany in September 1943 and it was administered as a part of the German Operation Zone of the Adriatic Littoral.
- Province of Spalato (Italian: provincia di Spalato) (1941–1943). Created during World War II. It was a part of the Governorship of Dalmatia. It was occupied by Germany in September 1943 and later annexed by the Independent State of Croatia.
- Province of Cattaro (Italian: provincia di Cattaro) (1941–1943). Created during World War II. It was a part of the Governorship of Dalmatia. It was occupied by Germany in September 1943 and partially annexed by the Independent State of Croatia.

=== Colonial provinces ===
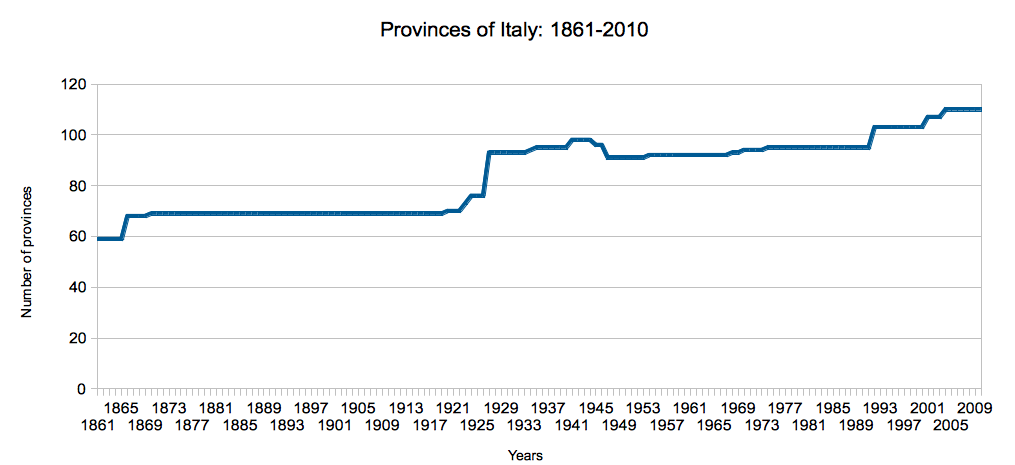
Trend in number of provinces from 1861 to 2010

- Province of Rhodes (Italian: provincia di Rodi) (1923–1947) or Italian Aegean Islands (Italian: Isole italiane dell'Egeo). It remained nominally a part of the Italian Social Republic after the Italian capitulation.
- Italian Libya was divided into four provinces and one territory (Southern Military Territory or Territory of Saharan Libya). From 1939 onward the provinces were a part of metropolitan Italy.
  - Province of Tripoli (Italian: provincia di Tripoli) (1937–1943).
  - Province of Misurata (Italian: provincia di Misurata) (1937–1943).
  - Province of Benghazi (Italian: provincia di Bengasi) (1937–1943).
  - Province of Derna (Italian: provincia di Derna) (1937–1943).

=== Theoretical provinces ===
- Province of the Western Alps (Italian: provincia delle Alpi Occidentali). Planned World War II province to be created of the Italian-annexed French territories of the Alpes Maritimes (including the Principality of Monaco) and parts of Alpes-de-Haute-Provence, Hautes-Alpes, and Savoie. The town of Briançon (Italian: Brianzone) was to act as the provincial capital.
- Province of Corsica (Italian: provincia della Corsica). Planned to be created after World War II Axis powers victory, with Petru Giovacchini as possible "governor".
- Province of Ragusa in Dalmatia (Italian: provincia di Ragusa di Dalmazia). Planned World War II province to be created of the Italian-annexed Dalmatian territories that were areas of the ancient Republic of Ragusa.
- Provinces in islands of Greece: provincia delle Ionie; provincia delle Cicladi; provincia di Samo. Planned World War II provinces to be created of the Italian-annexed islands of Greece (Ionian Islands, Cyclades, and Samos).

== Controversies ==
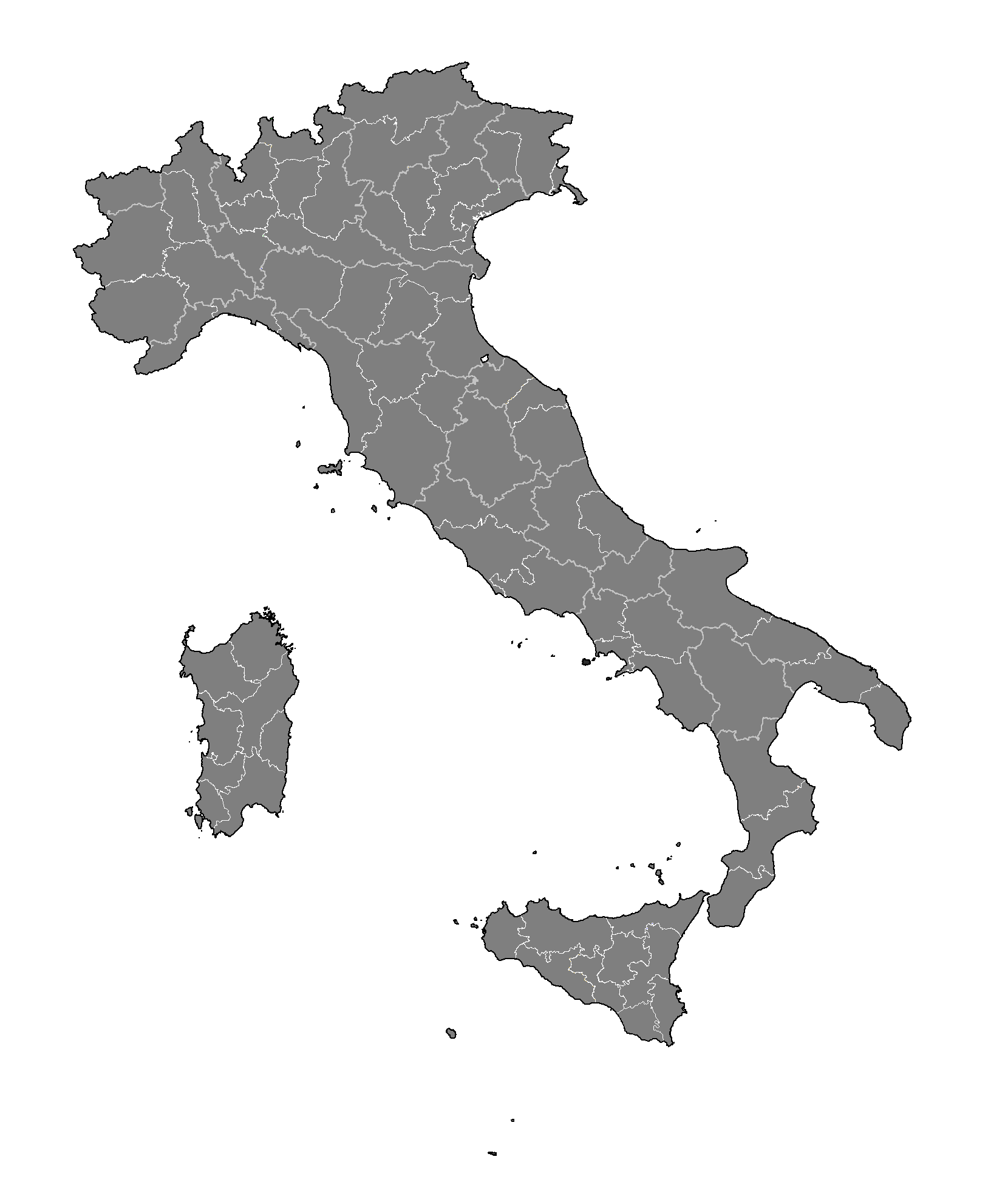
Provinces as proposed by the Monti Cabinet in 2012

Provinces are often deemed useless by their critics, and many proposals were made in the 2010s to eliminate them. The difficulty of changing the Constitution of Italy and the opposition of groups of politicians and citizens halted any proposal of reform.

In 2013, during his speech to the Chamber of Deputies, Enrico Letta, the newly appointed Prime Minister of Italy, announced that a revision of the second part of the constitution was needed, in order to change the bicameral parliamentary system and to abolish the provinces. The proposal, presented during the Renzi government, was rejected in the 2016 Italian constitutional referendum held on 4 December.

== See also ==
Media related to Provinces of Italy at Wikimedia Commons

- ISO 3166-2:IT
- Regions of Italy
- Metropolitan cities of Italy
- Municipalities of Italy
