= Governorate of Dalmatia =

Administrative division of Italy (1918–1920, 1941–1943)

Coordinates: 43°31′N 16°03′E

Governorate of Dalmatia Governatorato di Dalmazia (Italian) Guvernatorat Dalmacija (Croatian)
- 1918–1920; 1941–1943
- Flag Coat of arms
- Motto: FERT (Motto for the House of Savoy)
- Anthem: Marcia Reale d'Ordinanza (Note: Unofficial anthem was Giovinezza ("Youth").) ("Royal March of Ordinance")
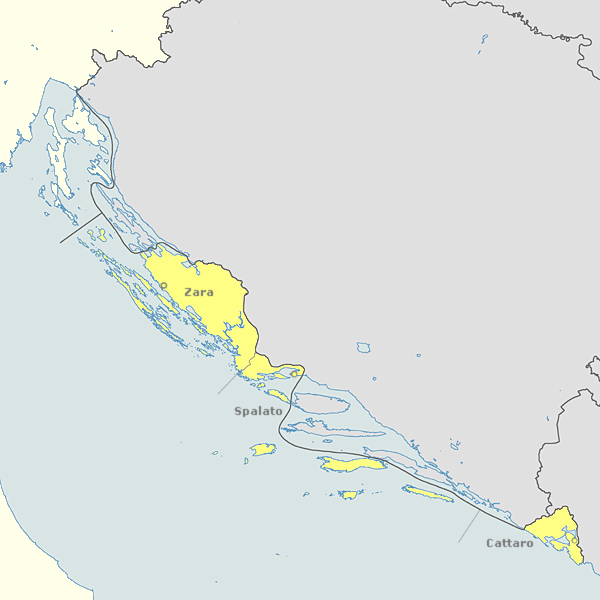
- The second Governorate of Dalmatia in 1941
- Status: Provinces of the Kingdom of Italy
- Capital: Šibenik (1918–1919); Zadar (1919–1920, 1943–1944)
- Common languages: Italian; Croatian
- Religion: Roman Catholic
- King
  - 1918–1920: Victor Emmanuel III
  - 1941–1943: Victor Emmanuel III
- Governor
  - 1918–1920: Enrico Millo
  - 1941: Athos Bartolucci
  - 1941–1943: Giuseppe Bastianini
  - 1943: Francesco Giunta
- Historical era: World War I and World War II
  - First established: 21 November 1918
  - First disestablished: 12 November 1920
  - Second established: 18 May 1941
  - Second disestablished: 10 September 1943

Area
  - Total: 5,242 km^{2} (2,024 sq mi)

Population
  - 1941: 380,100
  - Density: 61.6/km^{2} (159.5/sq mi)
- Currency: Italian lira
Preceded by
1918: Austria-Hungary
1941: Independent State of Croatia
1941: Province of Zara
Succeeded by
1920: Kingdom of Yugoslavia
1943: Independent State of Croatia
1943: Italian Social Republic
- Today part of: Croatia; Montenegro

The Governorate of Dalmatia (Italian: Governatorato di Dalmazia; Croatian: Guvernatorat Dalmacija) was an administrative division of the Kingdom of Italy that existed during two periods, first from 1918 to 1920 and then from 1941 to 1943. The first Governorate of Dalmatia was established following the end of World War I, given the London Pact (1915), and was disestablished following the Treaty of Rapallo. The London Pact also promised Italy part of Dalmatia (for the presence of Dalmatian Italians). However, both the peace settlement negotiations of 1919 to 1920 and the Fourteen Points of Woodrow Wilson, who advocated self-determination, took precedence, with Italy being permitted to annex only Zadar from Dalmatia, with the rest of Dalmatia being part of Yugoslavia. Enraged Italian nationalists considered the decision to be a betrayal of the promises of the London Pact, so this outcome was denounced as a "mutilated victory".

The second Governorate of Dalmatia was established following the military conquest of Yugoslavian Dalmatia by General Vittorio Ambrosio, during World War II. It had the provisional purpose of progressively importing Italian national legislation in Dalmatia in place of the previous one, thus fully integrating it into the Kingdom of Italy. It was a territory divided into three provinces of Italy during the Fascist Italy and Italian Empire epoch. It was created as an entity in April 1941 at the start of World War II in Yugoslavia, by uniting the existing province of Zara with occupied Yugoslav territory annexed by Italy after the invasion of Yugoslavia by the Axis powers and the signing of the Rome Treaties.

== Background ==
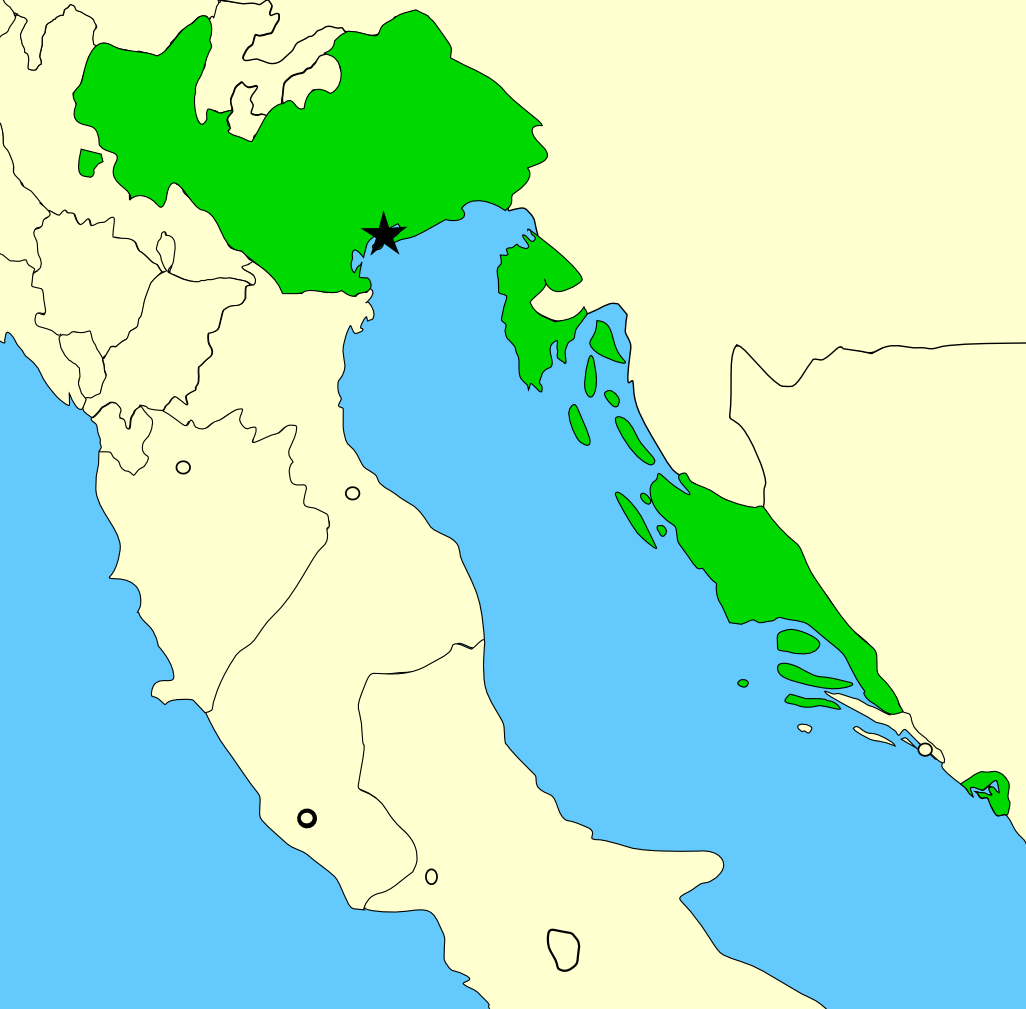
Dalmatian possessions of the Republic of Venice from 1420 to 1797

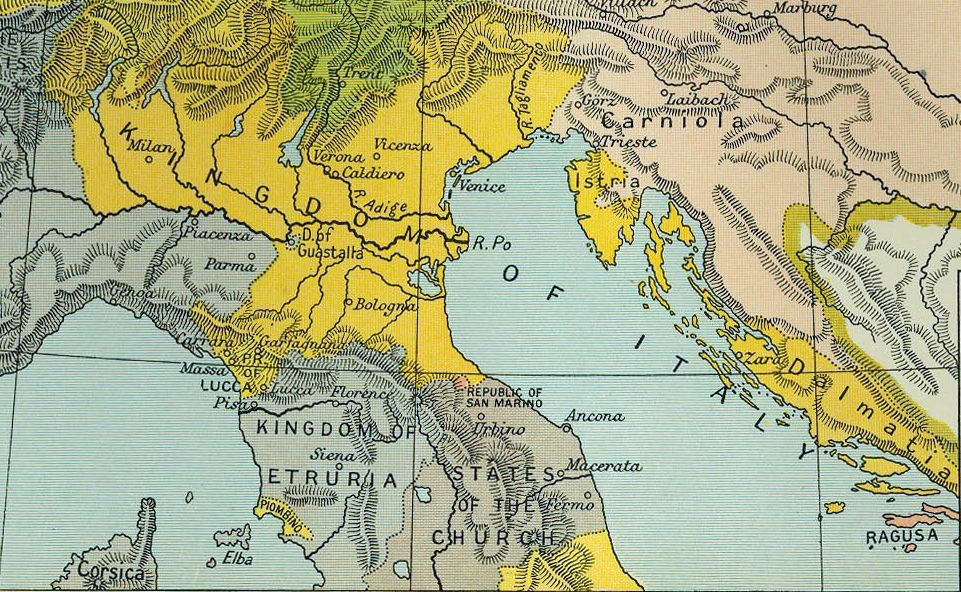
The Napoleonic Kingdom of Italy in 1807 shown in yellow

The Republic of Venice, between the 9th century and 1797, extended its dominion to Istria, Dalmatia and the islands of Kvarner, when it was conquered by Napoleon. Istria and Dalmatia were then aggregated to the Napoleonic Kingdom of Italy in 1805, and annexed to the Illyrian Provinces in 1809 (for some years also the Republic of Ragusa was included, since 1808). After the fall of Napoleon in 1814, Istria, Dalmatia and the islands of Kvarner were annexed to the Austrian Empire. From the Middle Ages to the 19th century, Italian and Slavic communities in Dalmatia had lived peacefully side by side because they did not know the national identification, given that they generically defined themselves as "Dalmatians", of "Romance" or "Slavic" culture.

Later, many Dalmatian Italians looked with sympathy towards the Risorgimento movement that fought for the unification of Italy. The first events that involved the Dalmatian Italians in the unification of Italy were the revolutions of 1848, during which they took part in the constitution of the Republic of San Marco in Venice. The most notable Dalmatian Italians exponents who intervened were Niccolò Tommaseo and Federico Seismit-Doda. However, after 1866, when the Veneto and Friuli regions were ceded by the Austrians to the newly formed Kingdom Italy, Dalmatia remained part of the Austro-Hungarian Empire, together with other Italian-speaking areas on the eastern Adriatic. This triggered the gradual rise of Italian irredentism among many Italians in Dalmatia, who demanded the unification of the Austrian Littoral, Fiume and Dalmatia with Italy.

Before 1859, Italian was the language of administration, education, the press, and the Austrian navy; people who wished to acquire higher social standing and separate from the Slav peasantry became Italians. In the years after 1866, Italians lost their privileges in Austria-Hungary, their assimilation of the Slavs came to an end, and they found themselves under growing pressure by other rising nations; with the rising Slav tide after 1890, italianized Slavs reverted to being Croats.

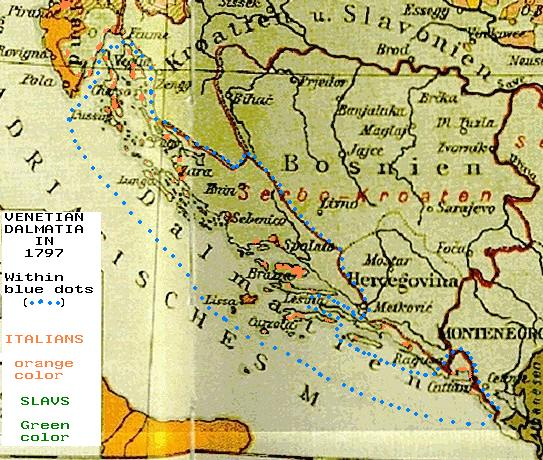
Austrian linguistic map from 1896. In green are the areas where Slavs were the majority of the population, in orange are the areas where Istrian Italians and Dalmatian Italians were the majority of the population. The boundaries of Venetian Dalmatia in 1797 are delimited with blue dots.

Austrian rulers found use of the racial antagonism and financed Slav schools and promoted Croatian as the official language, and many Italians chose voluntary exile. During the meeting of the Council of Ministers of 12 November 1866, Emperor Franz Joseph I of Austria outlined a wide-ranging project aimed at the Germanization or Slavization of the areas of the empire with an Italian presence:

His Majesty expressed the precise order that action be taken decisively against the influence of the Italian elements still present in some regions of the Crown and, appropriately occupying the posts of public, judicial, masters employees as well as with the influence of the press, work in South Tyrol, Dalmatia and Littoral for the Germanization and Slavization of these territories according to the circumstances, with energy and without any regard. His Majesty calls the central offices to the strong duty to proceed in this way to what has been established.

— Franz Joseph I of Austria, Council of the Crown of 12 November 1866

Dalmatia, especially its maritime cities, once had a substantial Italian-speaking population (Dalmatian Italians). According to Austrian censuses, the Italian speakers in Dalmatia formed 12.5% of the population in 1865, but this was reduced to 2.8% in 1910. The Italian population in Dalmatia was concentrated in the major coastal cities. In the city of Split in 1890 there were 1,971 Dalmatian Italians (9% of the population), in Zadar 7,672 (27%), in Šibenik 1,090 (5%), in Kotor 646 (12%) and in Dubrovnik 356 (3%). In other Dalmatian localities, according to Austrian censuses, Italians experienced a sudden decrease: in the twenty years 1890-1910, in Rab they went from 225 to 151, in Vis from 352 to 92, in Pag from 787 to 23, completely disappearing in almost all inland locations.

While Slavic-speakers made up 80-95% of the Dalmatia populace, only Italian language schools existed until 1848, and due to restrictive voting laws, the Italian-speaking aristocratic minority retained political control of Dalmatia. Only after Austria liberalised elections in 1870, allowing more majority Slavs to vote, did Croatian parties gain control. Croatian finally became an official language in Dalmatia in 1883, along with Italian. Yet minority Italian-speakers continued to wield strong influence, since Austria favoured Italians for government work, thus in the Austrian capital of Dalmatia, Zara, the proportion of Italians continued to grow, making it the only Dalmatian city with an Italian majority.

In 1909, the Italian language lost its status as the official language of Dalmatia in favor of Croatian, and could no longer be used in the public and administrative sphere.

== The first Governorate of Dalmatia ==
Dalmatia was a strategic region during World War I that both Italy and Serbia intended to seize from Austria-Hungary. Italy joined the Triple Entente Allies in 1915 upon agreeing to the London Pact that guaranteed Italy the right to annex the northern of Dalmatia in exchange for Italy's participation on the Allied side. From 5 to 6 November 1918, Italian forces were reported to have reached Vis, Lastovo, Šibenik, and other localities on the Dalmatian coast. At the end of hostilities in November 1918, the Italian military had seized control of the entire portion of Dalmatia that had been guaranteed to Italy by the London Pact, and by 17 November, it had seized Fiume as well. In 1918, Admiral Enrico Millo declared himself the Italian governor of Dalmatia. The Italian nationalist Gabriele d'Annunzio supported the seizure of Dalmatia and proceeded to Zadar in an Italian warship in December 1918.

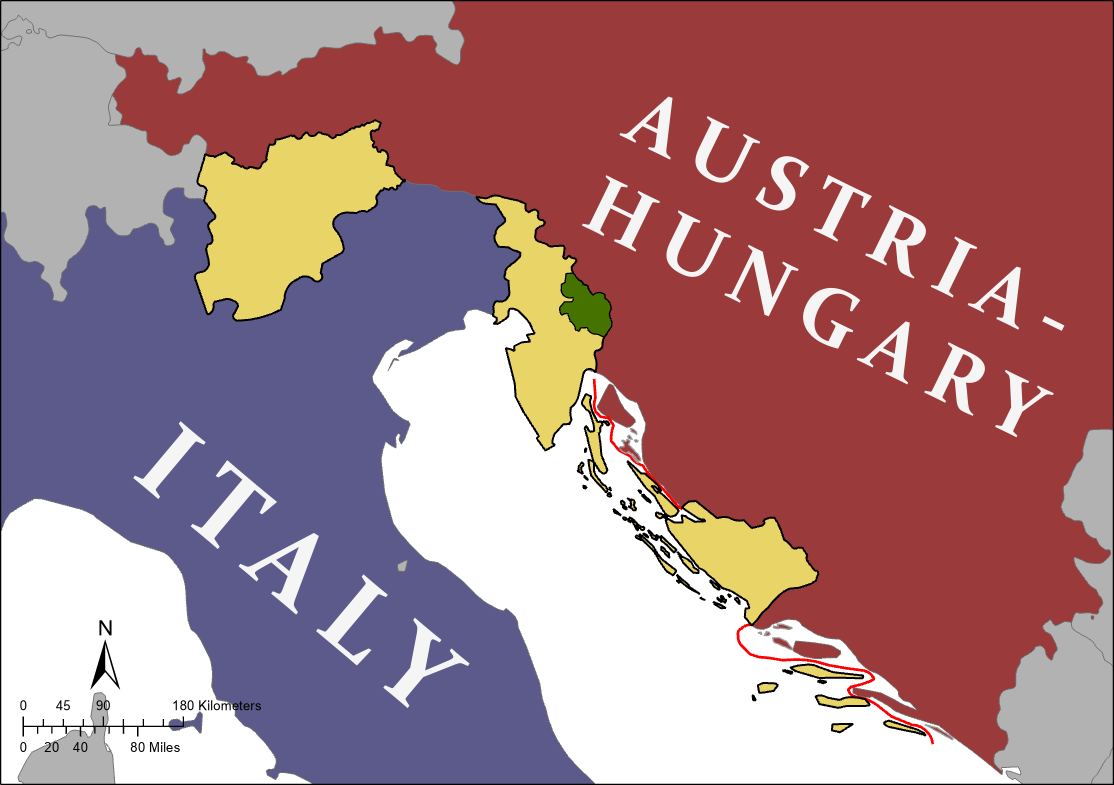
Territories promised to Italy by the London Pact (1915), i.e. Trentino-Alto Adige, the Julian March and Dalmatia (tan), and the Snežnik Plateau area (green). Dalmatia, after WWI, however, was not assigned to Italy but to Yugoslavia

The ships of the Italian Royal Navy occupied the main Dalmatian ports, where they made contact with the headquarters of the Fasci nazionali, i.e. the local sections of the Italian political party expression of the dissident Italian fascist movement. Following the withdrawal of the Austrian army from Dalmatia, the Yugoslav National Council, which was formed in Zagreb awaiting the union of Croatia with Serbia, established a provisional government of Dalmatia which extended from Split to Zadar. In Zadar, the former mayor Luigi Ziliotto, who belonged to the Italian-Dalmatianist Autonomist Party, organized a local government that opposed the Slavic governorship, proclaiming the authority of the Fascio nazionale over the municipality of Zadar, investing it with the powers previously held by the Zadar municipal council dissolved in 1916.

On 31 October 1918, the Kingdom of Italy, with the consent of the Allies, militarily occupied Dalmatia, including many areas not promised by the London Pact but provided by the Armistice of Villa Giusti between the Kingdom of Italy and Austria-Hungary, which foresaw the end of the war and the surrender of the latter. On 4 November 1918, the Italian Royal Navy occupied the islands of Vis, Lastovo, Molat, and Korčula, where the Yugoslav national committees offered no armed resistance. Also on 4 November 1918, the ship that docked in Zadar was welcomed by Luigi Ziliotto, amidst the exultation of the Dalmatian Italians of the city. On the Yugoslav side, there were only diplomatic protests. In the following days the situation around Zadar changed, with the Yugoslavs starting to organize themselves militarily in the areas surrounding the city. The Italian military occupation of Šibenik, city not included in the London pact, was slightly more difficult, given the hostility of the Croatian population. The Italian Royal Navy then continued to occupy the Dalmatian coast, continuing southwards, arriving, on 9 November 1918, at Cape Planka on behalf of the Allies.

All the other Dalmatian islands were occupied during November. For example, among the largest, Hvar on 13 November, and Pag on 21 November. In Cres and Lošinj there was an enthusiastic welcome from the Italian Dalmatians who lived on the two islands. On 26 November, the Italian Royal Navy also occupied Krk and Rab, islands not included in the London Pact. The main pro-Yugoslav element that opposed the Italian occupation was the local clergy, so much so that the Italian authorities decided to expel the bishop of Krk, Anton Mahnič, who established and led the Croatian Catholic Movement.

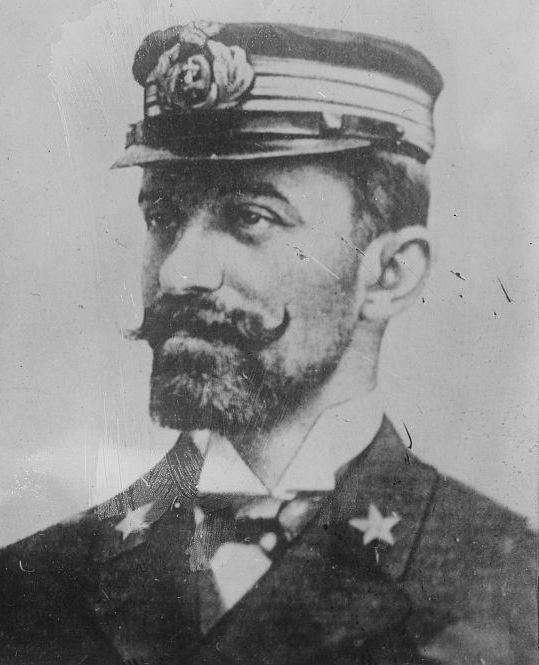
Enrico Millo, the first governor of Dalmatia

Once all of Dalmatia had been occupied, the Italian government appointed Vice Admiral of the Italian Royal Navy Enrico Millo as its governor, who had already held political roles, given that he was also Minister of the Navy and had always supported the annexation of Dalmatia to Italy. Initially the capital of the Governorate of Dalmatia was established in Šibenik, a political decision which signified the intention of the Kingdom of Italy to retain control of the whole of Dalmatia. In the spring of 1919, the capital was moved to Zadar. As his first action, Millo officially removed civil and political authority from the local Yugoslavian national committees. At the same time he allowed pro-Yugoslav representatives to remain in the Dalmatian Provincial Diet and in the Dalmatian Court of Appeal. The former members of the pro-Italian Autonomist Party merged massively into the Fasci nazionali, and began to cover political roles and some of them were hired by public institutions. The former officials of Austria-Hungary, although they were contacted by the Italian administration, did not want to hold political and civil roles for fear of reprisal in the event that Dalmatia was annexed to Yugoslavia.

The Dalmatian hinterland was not occupied by any army for the entire month of November, even though it was de facto administered by the Yugoslav national committees dependent on Zagreb. The Italian Armed Forces, after having consolidated their control over the ports and islands, and with the arrival of reinforcements from the homeland, began to penetrate the hinterland of the Dalmatia, occupying Vodice (on 3 December 1918), and Scardona/Skradin (on 5 December 1918). The case of the occupation of Tenin/Knin was much more complex, given the scarce presence of Dalmatian Italians, while the Serbian presence was conspicuous. Enrico Millo ordered the Serbian army, which had arrived in the meantime, to withdraw, given that they were territories granted to the Kingdom of Italy by the Armistice of Villa Giusti. After repeated armed clashes between the two armies, Italian troops occupied Knin on 1 January 1919.

Enrico Millo tried to gain the political consensus of the Slavic Dalmatians by improving living conditions, creating health services, distributing food, and stimulating the agricultural economy by decreeing a ban on the import of oil and wine from Italy. More generally, to encourage the growth of the Dalmatian economy, he established a favorable exchange rate between the former Austrian crown and the Italian lira for the local economy. The Italian authorities also left freedom of association to the Slavs, allowing the establishment of political parties and cultural associations, and granting freedom of the press even to pro-Yugoslav newspapers, without prejudice to the fact that censorship was frequent. In Zadar, Šibenik, Hvar and Krk, popular demonstrations against the Italian occupation and in favor of the union of Dalmatia with Yugoslavia were frequent, which were organized by the aforementioned Catholic and Orthodox clergy. On the other hand, the Italian Fasci nazionali organized demonstrations in favor of the annexation of Dalmatia to the Kingdom of Italy. To try to avoid anti-Italian protests, Millo decreed expulsions from the Governorate of Dalmatia and ordered the confinement of civilians in special facilities without trial, causing official criticism and protests from the United States.

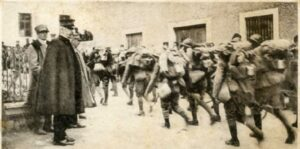
Enrico Millo inspects the Italian troops arriving in Šibenik (1918)

Political opposition to the Italian administration gradually waned, also due to the political evolution of the Kingdom of Yugoslavia, within which Serbian excessive power was increasingly evident. In fact, already at the beginning of 1919, in Yugoslavia, there was a decisive repression against the Croatian peasant movement of the Radic brothers and against the Yugoslav Social-Democratic Party. In this situation, the Croatian Catholic peasants, who were previously pro-Yugoslav, began to be indifferent to the Italian occupation. Enrico Millo, consequently, changed his government's political strategy. In fact, he began to present himself as a guarantor of social order and as a defender of Dalmatian Catholics against the Kingdom of Yugoslavia. As a consequence, anti-Italian sentiment continued to wane. In fact, it remained limitedly active in Zadar, Šibenik and Knin, as well as in Krk and Hvar.

However, in spite of the guarantees of the London Pact to Italy of a large portion of Dalmatia and Italian military occupation of claimed territories of Dalmatia (for the presence of Dalmatian Italians), both the peace settlement negotiations of 1919 to 1920 and the Fourteen Points of Woodrow Wilson, who advocated self-determination, took precedence, with Italy being permitted to annex only Zadar from Dalmatia, with the rest of Dalmatia being part of Yugoslavia. Enraged Italian nationalists considered the decision to be a betrayal of the promises of the London Pact, so this outcome was denounced as a "mutilated victory". The rhetoric of "mutilated victory" was adopted by Benito Mussolini, led to the rise of Italian fascism, and became a key point in the propaganda of Fascist Italy. Historians regard "mutilated victory" as a "political myth", used by fascists to fuel Italian imperialism and obscure the successes of liberal Italy in the aftermath of World War I.

== The second Governorate of Dalmatia ==
The Governorate of Dalmatia was made up of parts of coastal Yugoslavia that were occupied and annexed by Italy from April 1941 to September 1943 at the start of World War II in Yugoslavia, together with the prewar Italian Province of Zara on the Dalmatian coast, including the island of Lastovo and the island of Saseno, now Albania, and totalling about 200 km^{2} (77 sq mi), which Italy had possessed since 1919. The town of Zadar, which had included most of the Italian population of Dalmatia since the beginning of the 20th century and was largely Italian-speaking, was designated as its capital.

The creation of the Governorate of Dalmatia fulfilled the demands of Italian irredentism, but not all of Dalmatia was annexed by Italy, as the Italian-German quasi-protectorate known as the Independent State of Croatia took parts. Nevertheless, the Italian army maintained de facto control over the whole of Dalmatia.

The Kingdom of Italy divided the Governorate in three Italian provinces:

- the province of Zara, which was assigned to Italy after World War I following the Treaty of Rapallo (1920). At the time, it had an area of only 110.21 km^{2} (42.55 sq mi) (it was the smallest Italian province) with a population of 22,000 inhabitants distributed across two municipalities. In 1941, with the creation of the Governorate of Dalmatia, its provincial territory was broken up, reaching an area of 3,719 km^{2} (1,436 sq mi) and a population of 211,900 inhabitants distributed across 20 municipalities, which included the municipality of Zadar and its enlarged hinterland, plus Šibenik and the Dalmatian islands in front of Zara which came under Italian sovereignty;
- the province of Spalato, which included the cities of Split and Trogir, plus the islands of Šolta, Vis, Korčula, Lastovo, Sušac and Palagruža, the latter three separated from the province of Zara to which they belonged since 1920, and Mljet. The province had an area of 976 km^{2} (377 sq mi) and a population of 128,400 inhabitants distributed across 13 municipalities;
- the province of Cattaro, which included the centers of Kotor, Perast, Herceg Novi with a small hinterland roughly following the old Venetian and Austrian borders, plus the island of Sazan, facing the coast of Albania near Vlorë, the latter separated from the province of Zadar of which it had been part since 1920. The province had an area of 547 km^{2} (211 sq mi) and a population of 39,800 inhabitants distributed across 15 municipalities.

Officially, however, no Italian region was ever created with the name "Dalmatia". While the Governorate was not called a region of Italy, the northern Dalmatian islands of Krk and Rab were administratively united to the Italian province of Fiume (now Rijeka) and became areas of Italy.

In September 1941, Italy's fascist dictator, Benito Mussolini, ordered the military occupation of the entire Dalmatian coast, including the city of Dubrovnik ("Ragusa"), and islands such as Vis (Lissa) and Pag (Pago) which had been given to the puppet Independent State of Croatia of Ante Pavelić. Mussolini tried to annex these areas to the Governorship of Dalmatia creating the province of Ragusa di Dalmatia, but was temporarily stopped by the strong opposition of Pavelić, who retained nominal control of them. Fascist Italy even occupied Marindol and other villages that had previously belonged to the Banovina of Croatia, Milić-Selo, Paunović-Selo, Žunić-Selo, Vukobrati, Vidnjevići and Vrhovci. In 1942, these villages were annexed to Cernomegli (now Črnomelj, in Slovenia), which was then part of the Italian Province of Lubiana, even though their population was not Slovene, but Serbian.

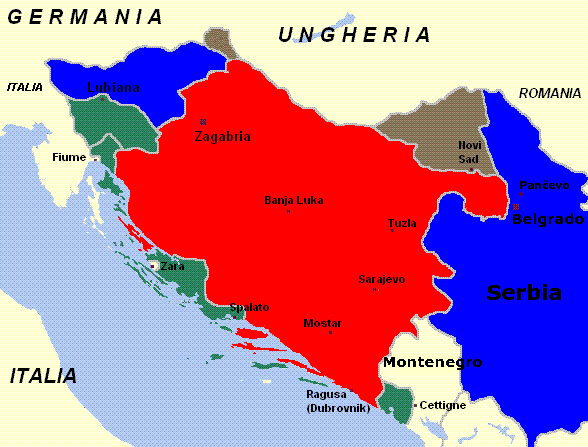
Division of Yugoslavia after its invasion by the Axis powers. Areas annexed by Italy: the area constituting the province of Ljubljana, the area merged with the province of Fiume and the areas making up the Governorate of Dalmatia Independent State of Croatia Area occupied by Nazi Germany Areas occupied by Kingdom of Hungary

Many public works were undertaken, such as new hospitals and sewages. At the end of 1941, an attempt was made to "normalize" civil life; in Split, for example, the creation of sporting activities linked to the Italian championships was promoted. For this purpose, in 1942 the Calcio Spalato team was re-established with the name Associazione Calcio Spalato, according to the directive of the Italian Football Federation (FIGC) which recognized AC Spalato as a new club affiliated to the Football Federation. However, due to the war events, AC Spalato did not play any championships.

At the end of 1941, the Slavic population was subjected to a policy of massive and violent Italianization. The political secretaries of the fascist party, of the after-work club, of the agricultural consortia and doctors, teachers, municipal employees, midwives were sent to administer them, immediately hated by those whose jobs they took away. Italian was imposed as a compulsory language for officials and teachers, although Serbo-Croatian was tolerated for communications within the civil administration. In the major centers, various signs written in Croatian were replaced by writings in Italian, Croatian flags, newspapers and posters were prohibited except the bilingual ones published by the Italian civil and military authorities; cultural and sporting societies dissolved, the Roman salute imposed, some Italian surnames restored. A special office for the Adriatic lands offered loans and benefits to those willing to denationalize, and in the meantime purchased land to redistribute to former Italian combatants. Scholarships were established for Dalmatians who wanted to continue their studies in Italy and 52 Dalmatian Italians and 211 Croatians and Serbs made use of them.

Numerous concentration camps were also established in the territory for repressive purposes, especially starting from 1942, such as those in Rab, Rijeka, and many others. Already from the end of 1941, against the atrocities committed by the Ustaše regime within the territories of the Independent State of Croatia, both against the Serbs and Jews and against the political opponents (communists and socialists), the communist and socialist partisan resistance led by Tito, multi-ethnic and communist, and various Serbian nationalist and monarchist factions known as Chetniks, were born. Numerous war crimes were committed by all parties, including the Italian fascists, resulting in a bloody civil war.

The governorship was held until January 1943 by Giuseppe Bastianini, when he was recalled to Italy to join the cabinet, his place as governor being taken by Francesco Giunta. The Governorate of Dalmatia was cancelled administratively by Badoglio on August 19, 1943; it was substituted by direct rule of the 3 "Prefetti" governing the provinces of Zara, Spalato and Cattaro. After the Kingdom of Italy changed sides to the Allies in 1943, German forces took over the area. The territory was not given to the fascist Italian Social Republic, which was a puppet state of Germany, but was instead completely dissolved and added to the puppet Independent State of Croatia.

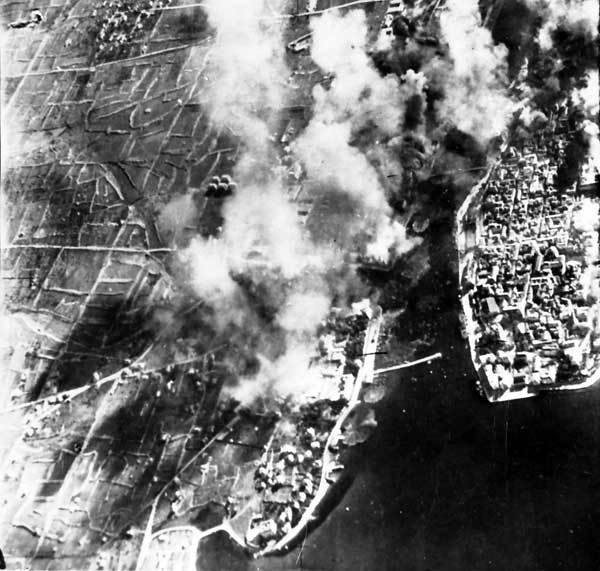
Bombing of Zadar in World War II by the Allies (1944): from these events began the exodus of the Dalmatian Italians from the city.

However, Zara (and the surrounding territory that was the original Provincia italiana di Zara until 1941) remained Italian (even if under nominal control and protection of the German Army) until 1945. The city was exposed to bombings between November 1943 and October 1944; the Allies documented 30 bombing raids, while contemporary Italian accounts claim 54; fatalities recorded range from nearly 1,000, up to as many as 4,000 of the city's 20,000 inhabitants and 60% of the city's buildings were fully destroyed.

The Yugoslav Partisans liberated Dalmatia in 1944. On October 30, 1944, the last Italian authority in Dalmatia – the Zara prefect Vincenzo Serrentino – left the destroyed city with the remaining Dalmatian Italians. Nearly 89% of the Zara buildings & installations were destroyed and so the city was called the "Dresden of Italy" After 1945, most of the remaining Dalmatian Italians fled the region (350,000 Italians escaped from Istria and Dalmatia in the Istrian-Dalmatian exodus). Currently there are only 300 Dalmatian Italians in the Croatian Dalmatia and 500 Dalmatian Italians in coastal Montenegro. After World War II, Dalmatia became part of the People's Republic of Croatia, part of the Federative People's Republic of Yugoslavia.

=== Territory ===
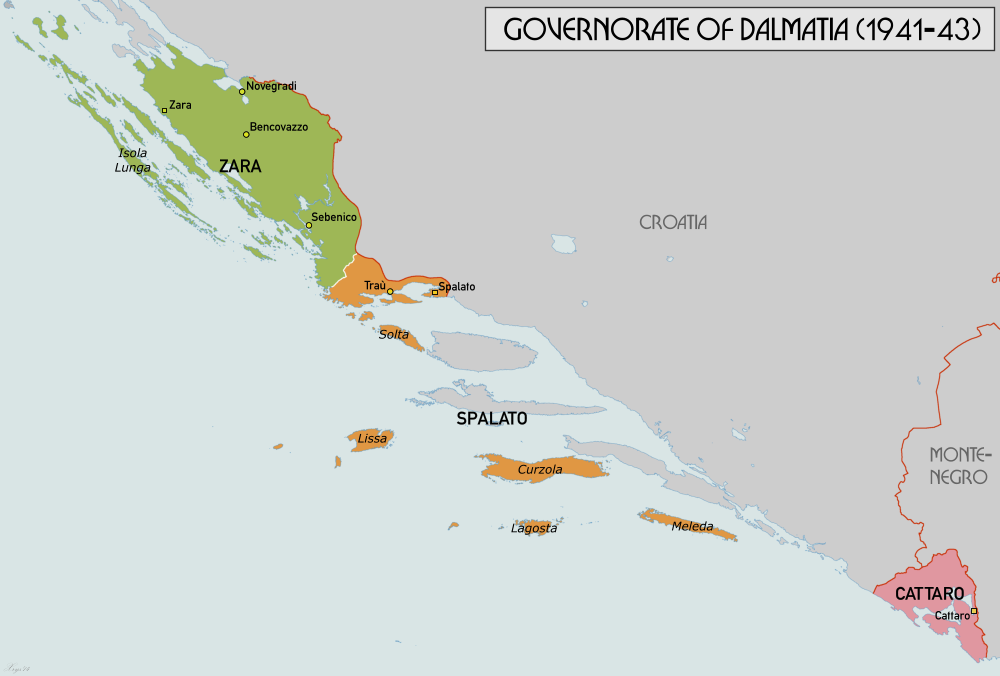
Detailed map of the three Italian provinces of the Governorate of Dalmatia: province of Zara, province of Spalato and province of Cattaro

The Governorate of Dalmatia consisted of three provinces: province of Zara, province of Spalato and province of Cattaro. The administrative capital was Zara.

After the autumn of 1941, the Dalmatian islands of Pag (Pago), Brač (Brazza) and Hvar (Lesina), part of the Independent State of Croatia, were occupied by the Italian army, along with an area of Croatia which was away from the coast of Sinj towards the center of Bosnia, near Sarajevo and Banja Luka. However these were not formally annexed to the Governorate.

=== Demographics ===
Province	Municipalities	Area	Population
Zara	20	3,719 km^{2} (1,436 sq mi)	211,900
Spalato	13	976 km^{2} (377 sq mi)	128,400
Cattaro	15	547 km^{2} (211 sq mi)	39,800
Total	48	5,242 km^{2} (2,024 sq mi)	380,100

The Governorate of Dalmatia had an area of 5,242 km^{2} (2,024 sq mi), equal to 35% of Dalmatia. The Governorate of Dalmatia contained 390,000 inhabitants, of which 270,000 (69.2%) Croats, 90,000 (23.0%) Serbs and 30,000 (7.6%) Dalmatian Italians.

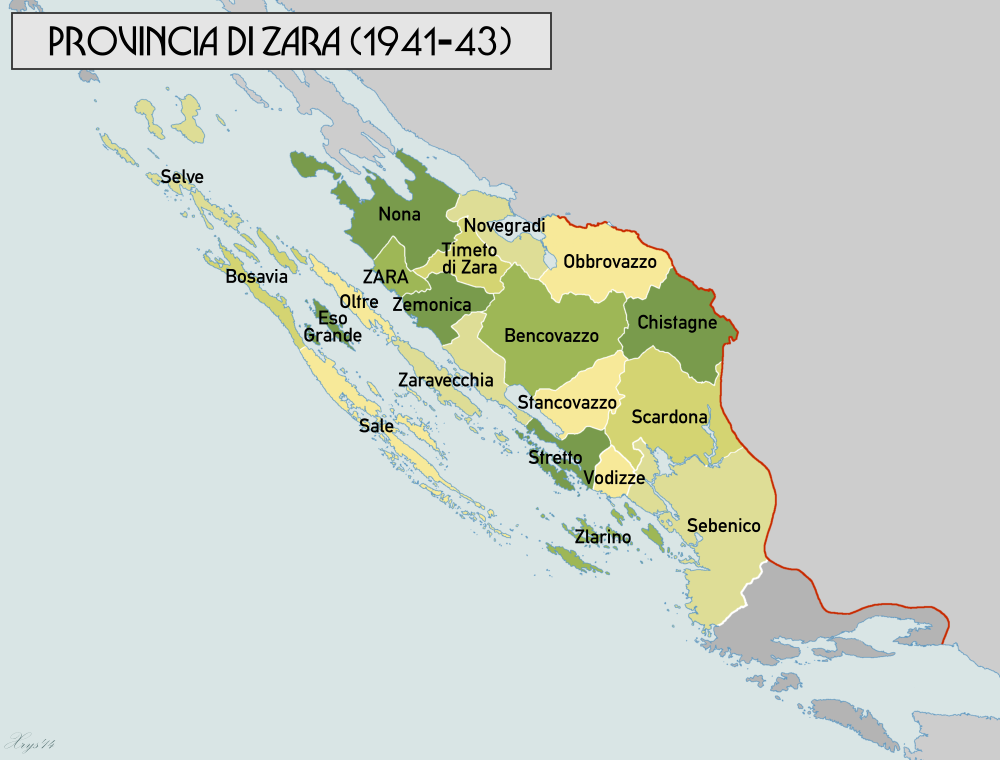
Province of Zara

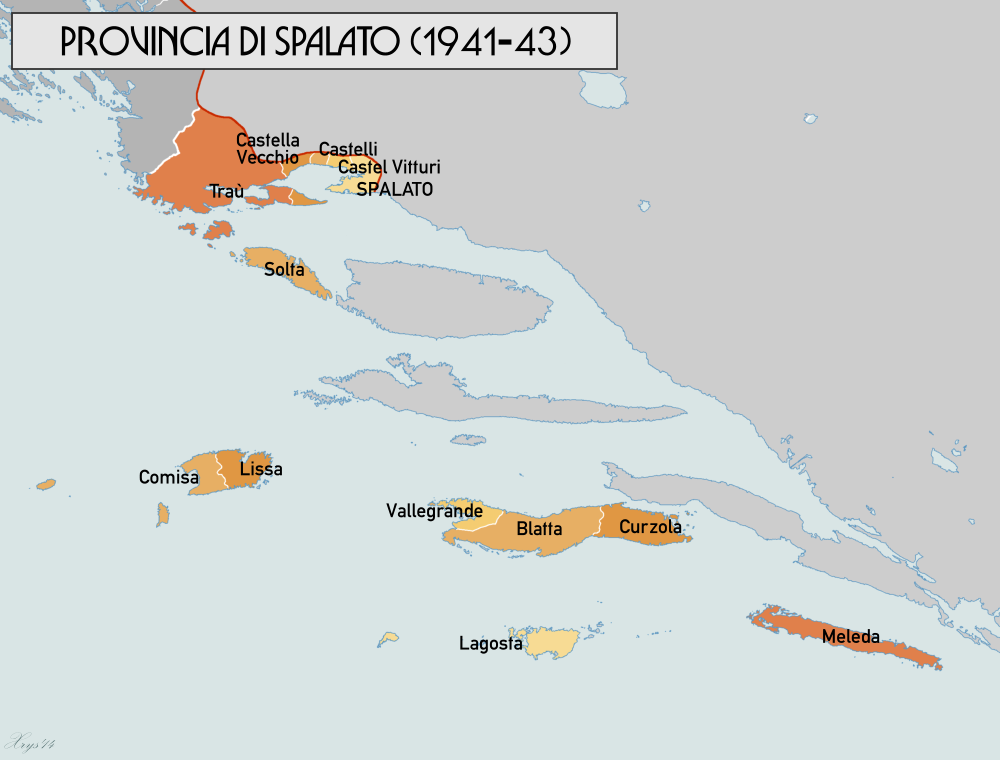
Province of Spalato

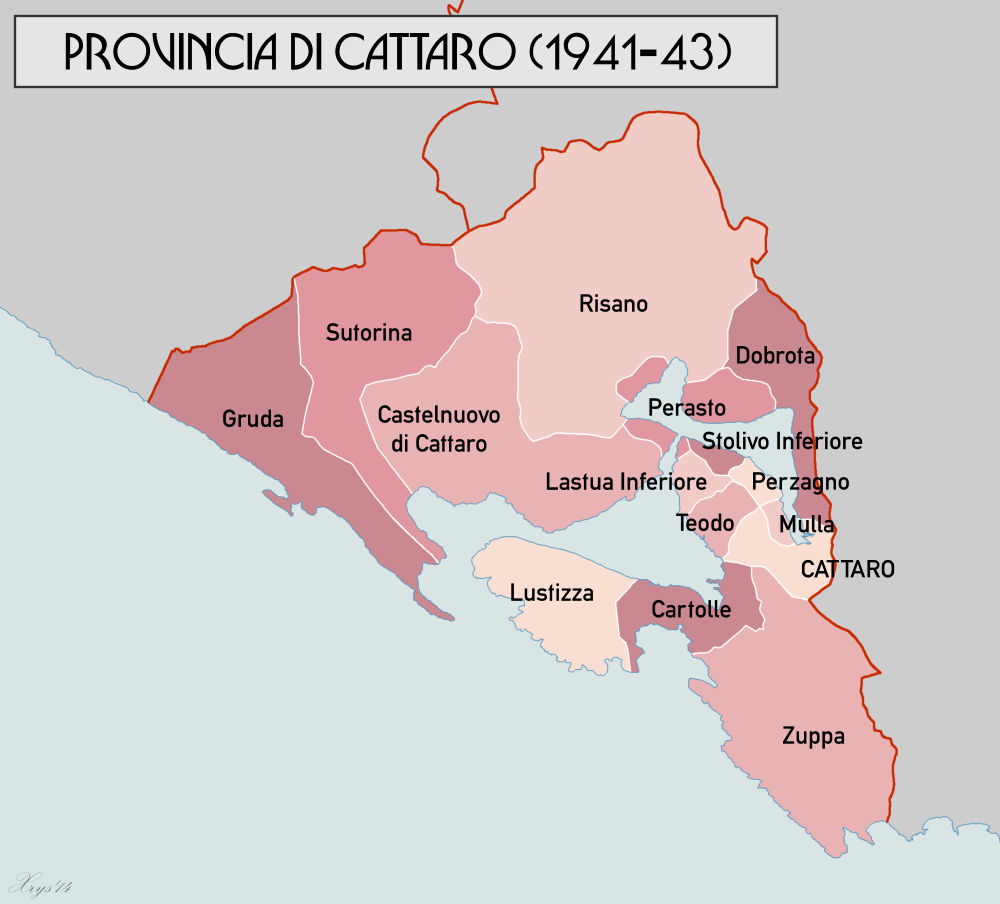
Province of Cattaro

== Governors of Dalmatia ==
- Enrico Millo (21 November 1918 – 12 November 1920)
- Athos Bartolucci (16 April 1941 – 6 June 1941)
- Giuseppe Bastianini (7 June 1941 – 14 February 1943)
- Francesco Giunta (14 February 1943 – 19 August 1943)

== See also ==
- Dalmatian Italians
- Dalmatia
- Invasion of Yugoslavia
- World War II in Yugoslavia
- Province of Zara
- Province of Spalato
- Province of Cattaro
