= Cattaro (disambiguation) =

Cattaro is the Italian name of Kotor, a coastal town in Montenegro.

Cattaro may also refer to:

- Province of Cattaro, was a province of the Italian Governorate of Dalmatia, created in May 1941 during World War II and lasted until 1943
- VA Cattaro (full name: Vaterpolo akademija Cattaro), professional water polo club and academy based in Kotor, Montenegro
- SS Cattaro, a number of steamships named Cattaro
