= Province of Zara =

Province in Italy

Coordinates: 44.1000°N 15.2167°E

Province of Zara Provincia di Zara (Italian) Zadarska provincija (Croatian)
- Province of the Kingdom of Italy
- 1920–1947
- Flag Coat of arms

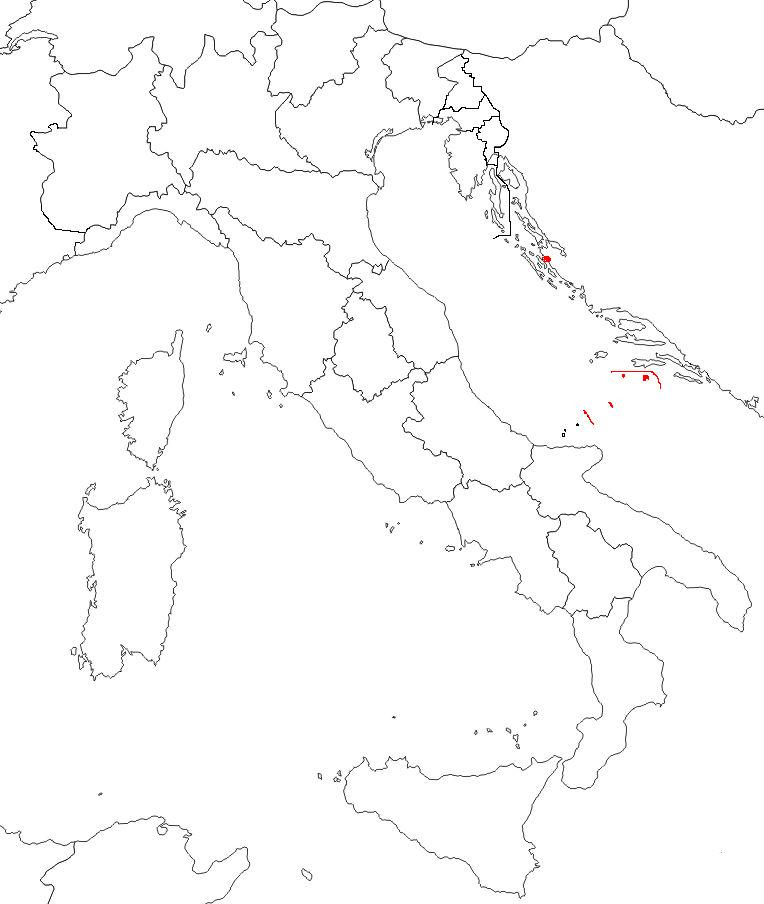
- The province of Zara in 1936
- Capital: Zara
- Demonym: Zaratino, Zadranin
  - Type: Constitutional monarchy
- History
  - Italian conquest: 4 November 1918
  - Treaty of Rapallo: 12 November 1920
  - Paris Peace Treaty: 10 February 1947
- Today part of: Croatia

The Province of Zara (Italian: Provincia di Zara; Croatian: Zadarska provincija) was a province of the Kingdom of Italy, officially from 1918 to 1947. In 1941 it was enlarged and made part of the Italian Governorate of Dalmatia, during World War II, until 1943.

== Historical background ==
Since the Middle Ages, the city of Zara was populated by Romance-speaking people (the Dalmatian Italians). Until the Treaty of Campo Formio it was the administrative capital of Venetian Dalmatia. Between 1805 and 1810 the city was part of the Napoleonic Kingdom of Italy. It would later become the center of Italian irredentism in Dalmatia. In the Austro-Hungarian census of 1910, the city of Zara had an Italian population of 9,318 out of 13,438 inhabitants (69.3 percent). In 1921, the population grew to 17,075 inhabitants, of which 12,075 Italians (70.8 percent). In 1940 Zara had a population of nearly 25,000, of which more than 23,000 were Italians, according to Davide Rodogno and Olinto Mileta.

In 1915 Italy entered World War I under the provisions set in the Treaty of London. In exchange for its participation with the Triple Entente and in the event of victory, Italy was to obtain Austro-Hungarian territory in northern Dalmatia, including Zara, Sebenico and most of the Dalmatian islands. At the end of the war, Italian military forces occupied Dalmatia and seized control of Zara, with Admiral Enrico Millo being appointed Governor of Dalmatia. Italian nationalist poet Gabriele d'Annunzio supported the annexation of Dalmatia, and sailed to Zara in an Italian warship in December 1918.

During 1918, political turmoil in Zara intensified. The dissolution of Austria-Hungary led to the renewal of national conflicts in the city. With the arrival of the Royal Italian Army in the city within the framework of the occupation of the eastern Adriatic on 4 November 1918, the Italian faction (which was the majority in the city) gradually assumed control, a process which was completed on 5 December when it took over the governorship. With the Treaty of Versailles (28 June 1919) Italian claims on Dalmatia contained in the Treaty of London were nullified, but later on the agreements between Italy and the Kingdom of Serbs, Croats and Slovenes (later Kingdom of Yugoslavia) set in the Treaty of Rapallo (12 November 1920) gave Zara and a small portion of surrounding territory to Italy.

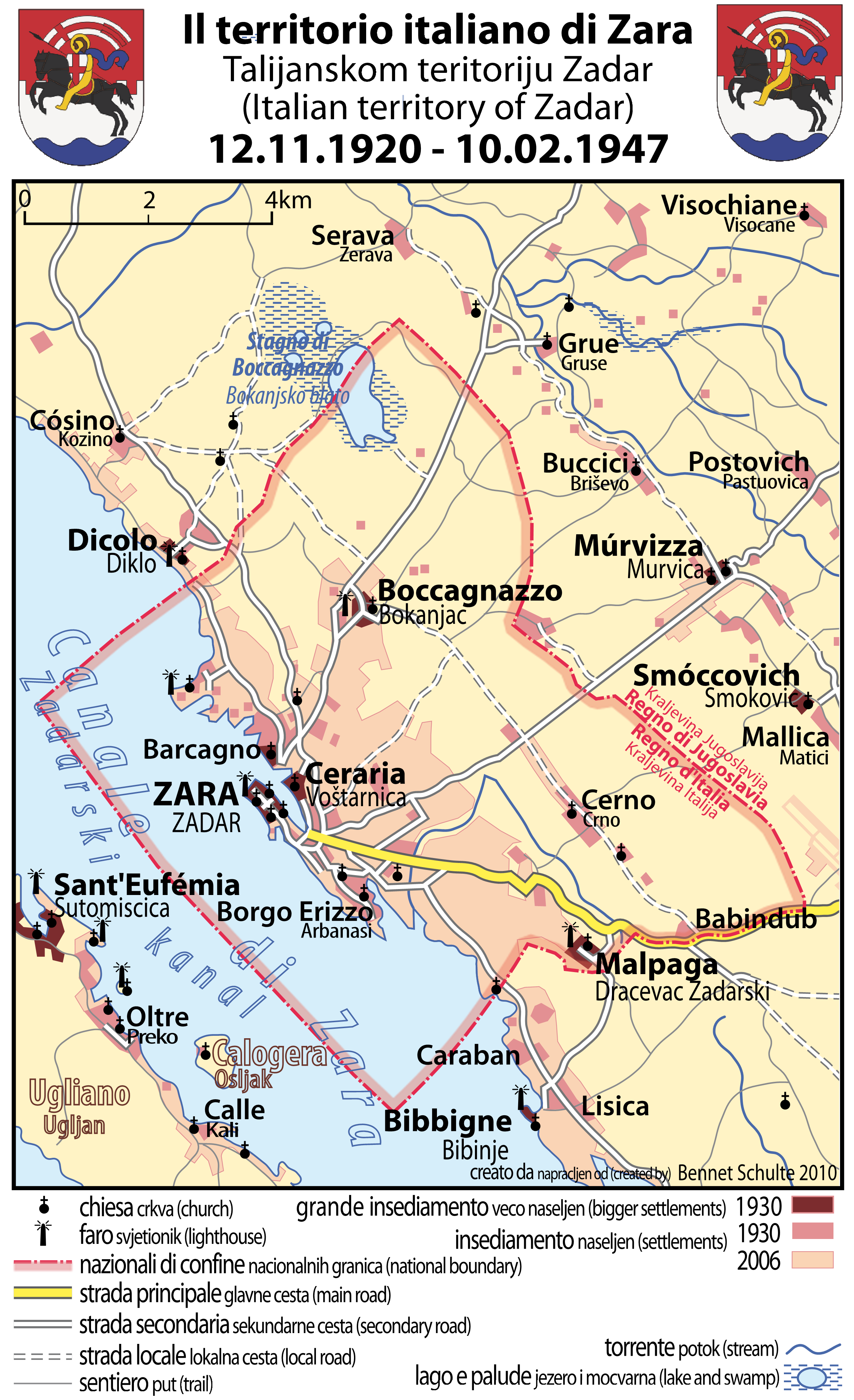
Italian territory of Zara 1920–1947

The Zara enclave, a total of 104 square kilometres (40 square miles), included the city of Zara, the hamlets of Boccagnazzo/Bokanjac, Borgo Erizzo/Arbanasi (house to a small Albanian community who had settled there in the eighteenth century), Cerno, and Dicolo/Diklo (a total of 51 km^{2}. of territory and 17,065 inhabitants) and the islands of Lagosta, Cazza and Pelagosa (53 square kilometres (20 square miles), 1,710 inhabitants, nearly all on Lagosta). The territory was organized into Italy's smallest province, with only two municipalities: Zara and Lagosta, and an overall population that never reached 30,000.

Also part of the province was the Albanian island of Saseno, just off the bay of Vlora, which had remained under Italian rule after the Italian withdrawal from Albania in 1920; it became part of the municipality of Lagosta, even though it was over 200 kilometres to its south.

The population of Lagosta, which numbered 1,945 in 1936, was 15 % Italian in 1921, but this had grown to 38 % by the late 1930s, owing to the migration of Italians from other islands and towns in Dalmatia which had become part of Yugoslavia.

=== World War II ===
Fascist Italy, and other Axis powers, invaded the Kingdom of Yugoslavia on April 6, 1941. Zara held a force of 9,000 Italian army soldiers and was one of the starting points of the invasion. The force under the command of General Vittorio Ambrosio easily defeated the collapsing Royal Yugoslav Army in a few days and reached Sebenico and Spalato on April 15, two days before the Yugoslavian surrender. Much of the civilian population of Zara had been previously evacuated to Ancona and Pola. Occupying Mostar and Dubrovnik (Ragusa in Italian), on April 17 the Zara troops met Italian troops that had started out from Italian Albania.

Within a few weeks, Benito Mussolini required the newly formed puppet-state, the so-called Independent State of Croatia (NDH), to hand over almost all of Dalmatia (including Spalato/Split) to Fascist Italy under the Treaties of Rome. The city became the center of a new Italian administrative territorial entity, called Governorate of Dalmatia, which included an enlarged province of Zara (which annexated the Dalmatian coast between Zara and Sebenico, its hinderland and the surrounding islands), the new Province of Spalato, and the new Province of Cattaro. The province of Zara was greatly enlarged, gaining nineteen new municipalities (Bencovazzo, Bosavia, Chistagne, Eso Grande, Nona, Novegradi, Obrovazzo, Oltre, Sale, Scardona, Sebenico, Selve, Stancovazzo, Stretto, Timeto di Zara, Vodizze, Zaravecchia, Zemonico, Zlarino), but also losing the islands of Lagosta, Cazza and Pelagosa, which became part of the province of Spalato, and Saseno, which became part of the province of Cattaro.

Under Italian fascist rule, at the end of 1941 the Slavic population was subjected to a policy of forced Italianization (related to the history of Venetian Dalmatia). Many public works were done, like new hospitals and sewages. The Province of Zara in 1942 had a population of 211,900 inhabitants and an area of 3,179 km^{2}.

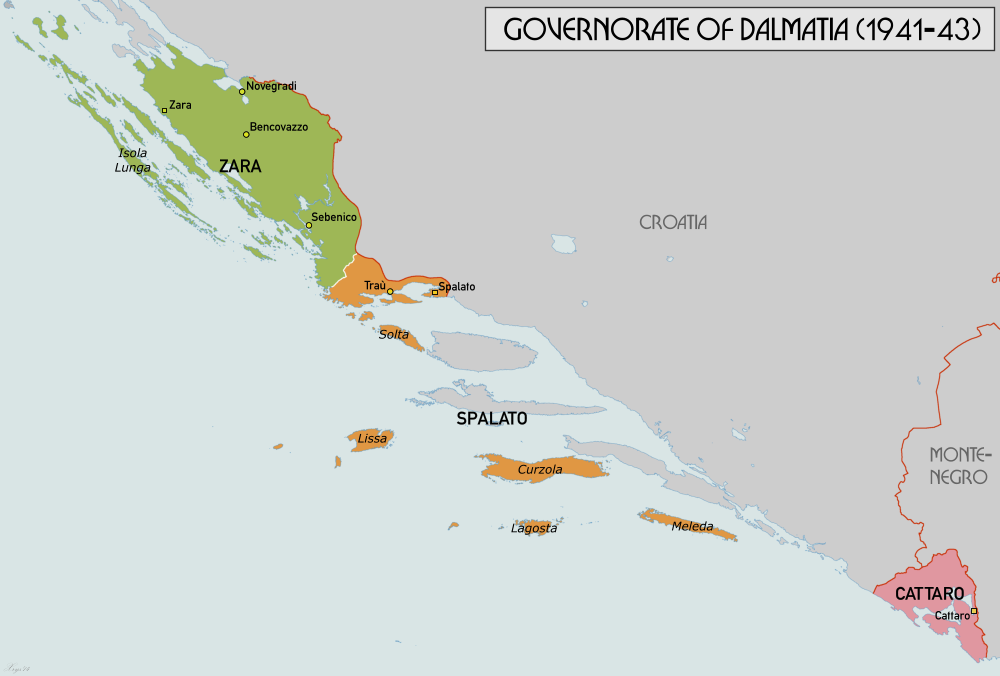
Italian Governorate of Dalmatia between April 1941 and September 1943.

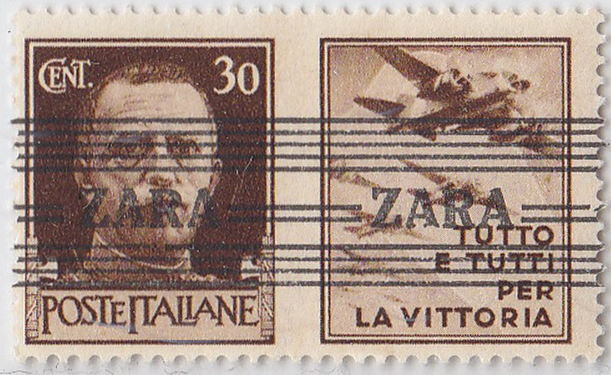
An Italian postage stamp overprinted by the German occupation forces for Zara, 1943

After Mussolini was removed from power on 25 July 1943 and arrested, the government of Pietro Badoglio signed an armistice with the Allies on 3 September 1943, which was made public only on 8 September 1943, and the Italian army collapsed. However, just four days later on 12 September 1943, "Il Duce", was rescued by a German military raid from his secret prison on the Gran Sasso mountain, and formed the Nazi-puppet Italian Social Republic in the north of the country. The NDH proclaimed the Rome Treaties to be void and occupied Dalmatia with German support. The Germans entered Zara first, and on September 10 the German 114th Jäger Division took over.

The city was prevented from joining the NDH on the grounds that Zara itself was not subject to the conditions of the Rome Treaties. Despite this, the NDH's leader Ante Pavelić designated Zadar as the capital of Sidraga-Ravni Kotari (one of the counties of the NDH), although its administrator was prevented from entering the city by the Italian authorities of the city. Zara remained under the local administration of the Italian Social Republic. Zara was bombed by the Allies, with serious civilian casualties. Many died in the carpet bombings, and many landmarks and centuries old works of art were destroyed. A significant number of civilians fled the city.

In late October 1944 the German Army and most of the Italian civilian administration abandoned the city. On October 31, 1944, the Partisans seized the city, until then an official part of Mussolini's Italian Social Republic. At the start of World War II, Zadar had a population of 24,000 (nearly all Dalmatian Italians) but, by the end of 1944, this had decreased to 6,000. Formally, the city remained under Italian sovereignty until the September 15, 1947 Paris Peace Treaty.

After World War II's end, the "Libero comune di Zara in esilio" (Free city of Zara in exile) was created by the exiled Italians of Zara, as a follow-up of the province of Zara.

The Italian exodus from the city continued and in a few years was almost total. The last stroke to the Italian presence was made by the local administration in October 1953, when the last Italian schools were closed and the students forced to move, in one day, into Yugoslavian schools, putting an end to the Romance identity of the city. Today the Italian community counts only a few hundred people, gathered into a local community (Comunità degli Italiani di Zara).

== Municipalities ==
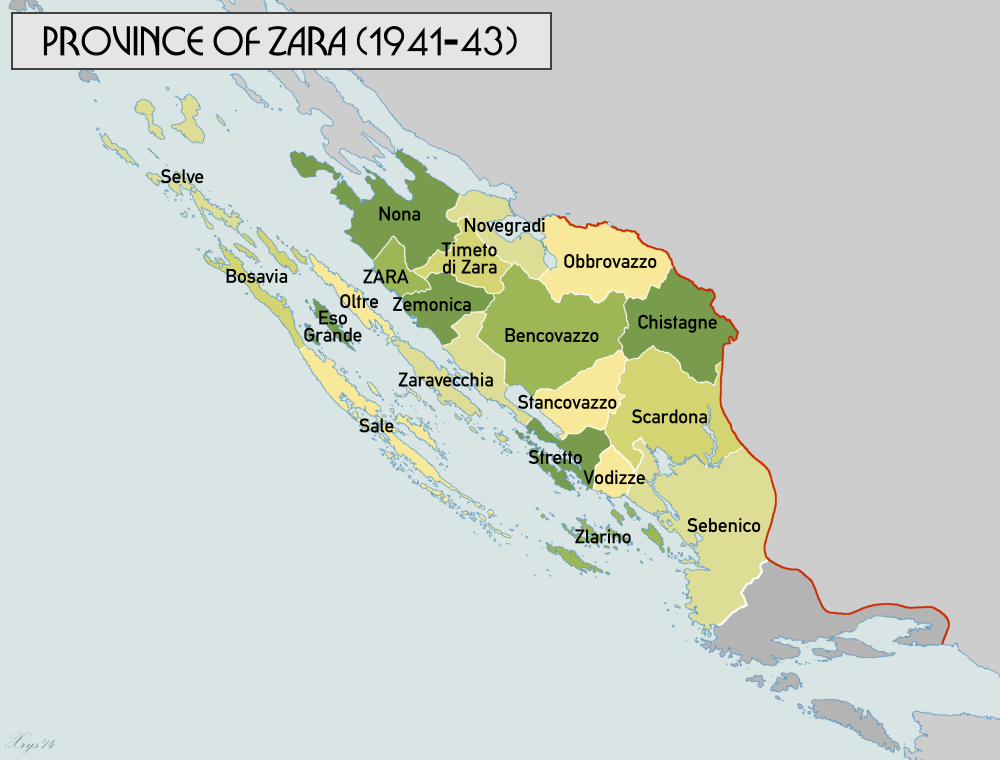
Map of municipalities of the province of Zara, after the enlargement in 1941, when the province was part of the Governorate of Dalmatia.

Before World War II there only a few localities in the province of Zara, like Boccagnazzo/Bokanjac and Borgo Erizzo/Arbanasi. But with the enlargement in 1941 the number grew to 20 (first in Italian the official name and then in Croatian the actual):

- Bencovazzo / Benkovac: 2,000 inhabitants.
- Bosavia or Bosava / Božava: 1,520 inhabitants (with Berbigno, Sauro, Sestrugno and Zaglava)
- Chistagne / Kistanje: 2,000 inhabitants
- Eso Grande / Iž Veliki (Iž Veli): 1,300 inhabitants
- Nona / Nin: 4,650 inhabitants (with Brevilacqua, Peterzane, Pogliazza, Puntadura, Rasanze, Verchè and Zatton)
- Novegradi / Novigrad: 5,217 inhabitants (with Castel Venier and Possedaria)
- Obbrovazzo / Obrovac: 1,400 inhabitants (with Ortopula)
- Oltre / Preko: 7,560 inhabitants (with Cuclizza, Neviane, Pasman, S. Eufemia, Tuconio and Ugliano)
- Sale / Sali: 2,090 inhabitants (with S. Stefano e Sman)
- Scardona / Skradin: 2,000 inhabitants
- Sebenico / Šibenik: 37,854 inhabitants (with Castell'Andreise and Zablacchie)
- Selve / Silba: 4,229 inhabitants (with Isto, Melada, Premuda and Ulbo)
- Stancovazzo / Stankovići: 1,000 inhabitants
- Stretto / Tijesno: 7,190 inhabitants (with Bettina, Gessera, Morter and Slosella)
- Timeto di Zara / Smilčić: 1,000 inhabitants
- Vodizze / Vodice: 7,500 inhabitants (with Crappano, Provicchio and Zatton)
- Zara / Zadar: 25,000 inhabitants
- Zaravecchia / Biograd: 2,520 inhabitants
- Zemonico / Zemunik Donji: 1,000 inhabitants
- Zlarino / Zlarin: 3,550 inhabitants (with Capri and Zuri)

The municipality-island of Lagosta/Lastovo was transferred to the Province of Spalato.

== See also ==
- Governorate of Dalmatia
- History of Dalmatia
- Dalmatian Italians
- Bombing of Zadar in World War II
