= D36 =

D36 may refer to:

== Ships ==
- Brazilian destroyer Alagoas (D36), an Alan M. Sumner-class destroyer of the Brazilian Navy
- HMS Defender (D36), a Type 45 destroyer of the Royal Navy
- HMS Vivacious (D36), a V-class destroyer of the Royal Navy
- Italian auxiliary cruiser Cattaro (D36), a Yugoslavian passenger ship seized by the Italian Navy

== Other uses ==
- D36 road (Croatia)
- LNER Class D36, a class of British steam locomotives
- Lotarev D-36, a turbofan engine
