= SS Cattaro =

A number of steamships have been named Cattaro, including

- SS Cattaro (1920), an Italian and German auxiliary cruiser in service 1941–44
- SS Cattaro (1922), a German cargo ship in service 1922–30
- SS Cattaro (1945), a British cargo ship
