= Province of Spalato =

Province of the Italian Governorate of Dalmatia

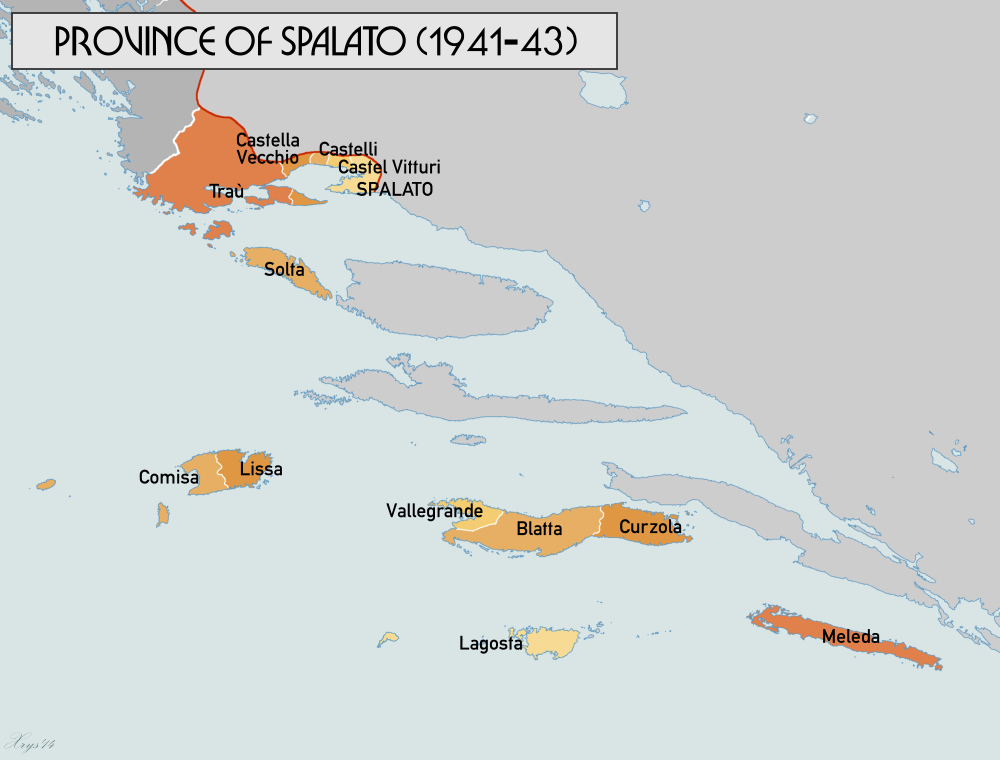
Map of the province of Spalato

Province of Spalato (Italian: Provincia di Spalato) was a province of the Italian Governorate of Dalmatia, created in May 1941 during World War II (by the "Regio Decreto Legge del 18 maggio 1941"). It lasted until September 1943.

== History ==
The puppet Independent State of Croatia ceded by the Treaties of Rome of 18 May 1941, extensive Adriatic coastal areas to the Fascist Kingdom of Italy. The ruling Italian National Fascist Party was a patron of Croatian fascist Ustasha Movement. Italy placed Ustasha leader Ante Pavelić as the head of Croatian puppet State after the dissolution of Yugoslavia in the April War 1941. Among the ceded areas was the city of Split in Dalmatia.

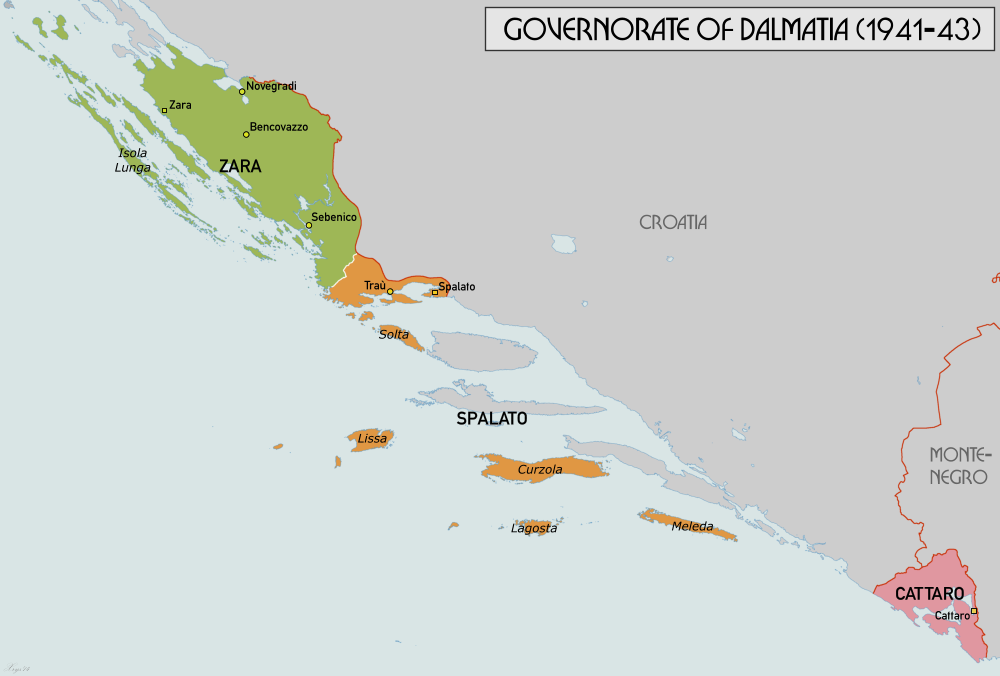
Governorate of Dalmatia

Italy created some provinces (administrative districts) in that region, that lasted until September 1943. One was the province of Spalato. The administrative capital was the city of Spalato (Italian name for Split).

The province had an area of 1,075 square kilometers and a population of 128,000 inhabitants. Most of the province's inhabitants were Croats, but there were more than 3,000 Dalmatian Italians (in Split alone there were over 1,000 in 1940, even if very few in number compared to the mid-19th century, when they were over a third of the city's inhabitants). The island of Lastovo, ceded after World War I to Italy and renamed Lagosta, was united to the province.

The Italians started immediately a process of improvement in the underdeveloped area, creating needed infrastructures from hospitals to schools and sewages.

Between 1941 and 1943 the governor of Dalmatia, Giuseppe Bastianini, sent tens of thousands of tons of food to Dalmatia, for a monthly value of 13 million lire at the time (over eight million euros today). In the new provinces there was no health organization worthy of the name and schools were almost non-existent. The Italian government established 27 medical clinics in the region entrusted to medical officers of the Royal Army, even making numerous midwives arrive from the Peninsula and establishing an itinerant health service, on trucks and motorboats, which carries out thousands of visits. The reclamation of 76,000 hectares of land and an agrarian reform were even started (for the Italian one it will be necessary to wait for 1950) which in the spring of 1942 had already registered the requests of 22,000 Slavic peasants for access to the benefits provided by law. Over a thousand teachers were recruited for the schools, 531 of whom were Italian and in 1941 over 260 Dalmatian students (211 of whom were Croatian) received scholarships for universities in the Kingdom of Italy. Fabrizio Gregorutti

Under orders of Mussolini, it was also started in July 1941 a process of forced Italianization (related to the history of Venetian Dalmatia).

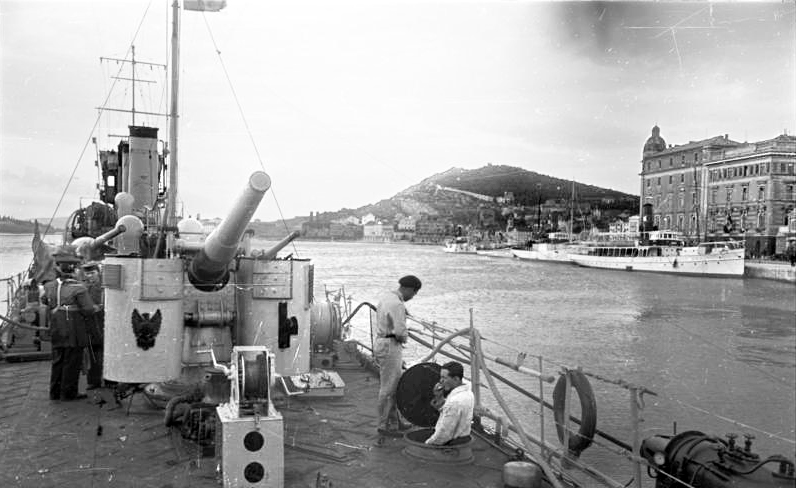
Italian destroyer in the 1942 Spalato port

Because of this, in the end of summer 1941 there was a resistance movement of Croats against the Italian conquest, but without huge consequences until spring/summer 1943.

Furthermore, in spring 1942 was created the football team Associazione Calcio Spalato, that was ruled by the Italian FIGC in the Italian championships.

Meanwhile, in 1941 and 1942 many Jews and some Serbs took refuge in the city, escaping from the nearby regions ruled by the Croatian Ustaše.

In September 1943 the German army took control of the region from the Italians, who had surrendered to the Allies, and soon started a terrible guerrilla war between the German occupiers and Josip Broz Tito's partisans. The province was cancelled in the same September and later annexed to Ante Pavelić's puppet Croatia.

== Administrative subdivision ==
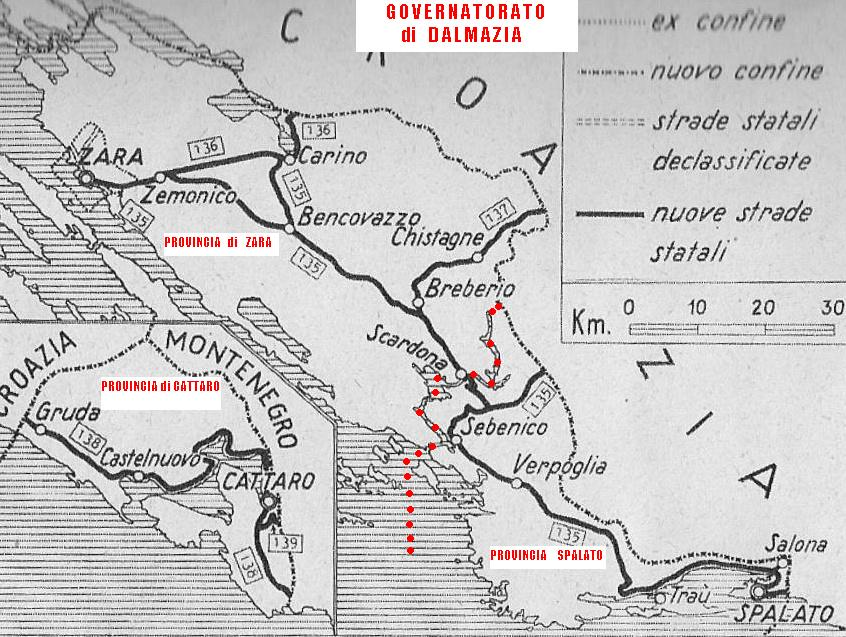
Original Map of the province of Spalato without the islands. Later the area around Sebenico was united to the Province of Zara

The 13 comuni were (first in Italian the official name and then in Croatian the actual):

- Spalato / Split
- Blatta / Blato
- Castella Inferiore or Castel Vecchio / Kaštel Stari ili Donja Kaštela
- Castelli / Kaštel Sućurac
- Castel Vitturi / Kaštel Lukšić
- Comisa / Komiža
- Curzola / Korčula
- Lagosta / Lastovo
- Lissa / Vis
- Meleda / Mljet
- Solta / Šolta
- Traù / Trogir
- Vallegrande / Vela Luka

== See also ==
- Governatorate of Dalmatia
- Province of Zara
- Province of Cattaro

== Bibliography ==
- Davide Rodogno. Il nuovo ordine mediterraneo, ed. Bollati Boringhieri. Turin, 2003
- Dalmacija in Hrvatska enciklopedija on line
- F. Gregorutti: Police report
