= Bombing of Zadar in World War II =

Bombing of Zadar
- Part of Strategic bombing during World War II
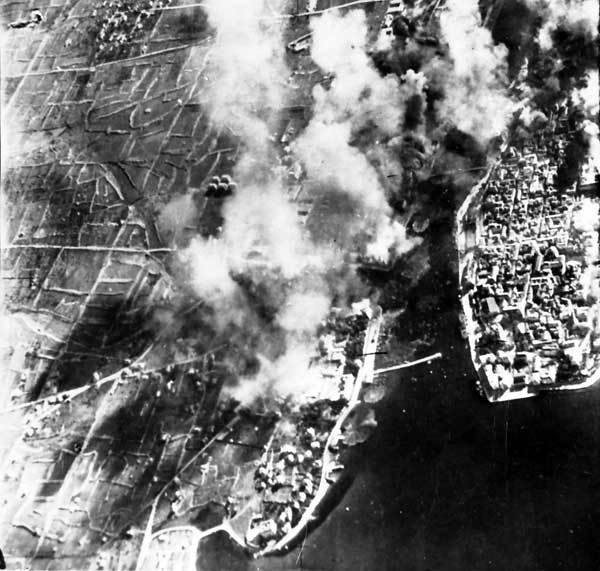
- Zadar during the bombing raid
Date	November 1943 – October 1944
Location	Zadar
Result	80% of the city's buildings destroyed; Extensive casualties

Belligerents
(United Kingdom) Royal Air Force (United States) US Army Air Forces	Italian Social Republic; Nazi Germany

Casualties and losses
0	1,000–4,000 deaths

The bombing of Zadar during the Second World War by the Allies lasted from November 1943 to October 1944. Although other large cities in Italy were also bombed, the bombing of Zadar stands out because of the number of attacks and the number of fatalities. Reports vary greatly; the Allies documented 30 bombing raids, while contemporary Italian accounts claim 54. Fatalities recorded range from under 1,000 to as many as 4,000 of the city's 20,000 inhabitants.

Over the course of the bombing, 80% of the city's buildings were destroyed. Zadar has been called the "Dresden of the Adriatic" because of perceived similarities to the Allied bombing of that city. In both cases, Allied bombs devastated a city rich in artistic and historical treasures but with little apparent industrial or military significance to the war.

It is the most significant historical event in Zadar after the siege of Zadar in 1202 by forces of the Fourth Crusade.

== Background ==
=== Italian enclave of Zara ===
Zadar (known in Italian as Zara) became part of the Kingdom of Italy as a result of the Treaty of Rapallo of 1920, which settled the status of former Austro-Hungarian territories. It had a large Italian majority and was an Italian enclave in Dalmatia. From the 1920s on, many more Croats were pressured to leave the city while their place was being taken by ethnic Italians resettling there from within Yugoslavian Dalmatia—such as the famous fashion stylist Ottavio Missoni, who moved with his family from Dubrovnik. The 1910 census in Austria-Hungary placed the Italians at 69.3% of the population, which consistently rose in the decades that followed. Public functionaries, teachers, and policemen were transferred from the mainland.

During this time, there was also a significant presence of military personnel.

Up until 1941, the city was surrounded by Italian fortifications, of which the bunker behind Gaženice and in the area of Ploče and Crnog were the most notable.

=== Second World War until the capitulation of Italy (1941–1943) ===
The Axis powers attacked the Kingdom of Yugoslavia on 6 April 1941. On 17 April, the Yugoslavian government surrendered. Zadar held a force of 9,000 commanded by General Emilio Gilioli that after bloody fighting on 15 April reached Šibenik and Split. Arriving in Dubrovnik and Mostar on 17 April, they met troops that had started out from Albania.

It is known that on 8 April, the Royal Yugoslav Air Force bombed Zadar. Although this resulted in some damage, it cannot be compared to the bombing that the city would endure two years later. The civilians had been previously evacuated towards Ancona and Pola. The Treaty of Rome in 1941 between the newly formed fascist puppet Independent State of Croatia (NDH) and Italy handed over a large part of northern Dalmatia to Italy including the cities of Split and Knin.

=== Italian capitulation ===
After Mussolini was removed from power, the new government of Pietro Badoglio declared an armistice, and on 8 September 1943, the Italian army collapsed. The NDH took advantage of this chaotic situation by proclaiming the Treaty of Rome to be void and occupying Italian Dalmatia with German support. However, the Germans entered Zadar first, and on 10 September the German 114 Infantry Division took over. This stopped the Partisans (the local Allied forces) from temporarily liberating Zadar, as was the case with Split and Šibenik.

The city was prevented from joining the NDH on the grounds that Zadar itself was not subject to the conditions of the Treaty of Rome, whether it was void or not. Despite this, the NDH's leader Ante Pavelić designated Zadar as the capital of the Sidraga-Ravni Kotari County, although its prefect was prevented from entering the city. Zadar remained under local Italian administration with German military protection, and in this unsure climate that the Allied bombing began.

== The bombing ==
The first large Allied aerial attack on Zadar was carried out on 2 November 1943 by the USAAF 12th Air Force, during which an orphanage was destroyed, among other buildings. Larger attacks followed on 28 November in which 200 people were killed, and on 16 December and 30 December. These first attacks caused many civilian casualties, but the city continued to function despite the damage. The attack on the 16th was especially harsh, as the shelters at Voštarnica and at the city's centre were hit, killing between 150 and 200 people. Fifty American B-25 medium bombers participated in the strikes, dropping 90 tonnes of bombs.

Besides these main attacks, the city was bombed to a lesser degree on other days. Through the use of carpet bombing, entire neighborhood blocks were destroyed. The city centre was hardest hit, especially around the Forum and the Callelarga street where no buildings were spared. As with other cases of urban bombings the damage was not caused by the initial explosions but the resulting fires, which turned the city into a pile of skeletons of burnt-out houses. Each attack targeted a specific part of the city. On the 16th, the area from the Church of Our Lady of Good Health to across the Callelarga to the Piazza delle Erbe (today's People's Square) was targeted, while on the 30th the area from the Riva Nova waterfront to Giuseppe Verdi Theatre was attacked. On 31 December, the city hospital and the majority of the industrial machinery was destroyed. The Luxardo factory (manufacturer of the Maraschino cherry liqueur) was set on fire, and the building burned for three days.

Attacks which completely ravaged Zadar followed from January to March 1944. On 16 January 1944, Liberator heavy bombers attacked Zara, losing one bomber but claiming nine Luftwaffe fighters. However, the number of casualties was much less because the population rendered homeless escaped to the less damaged outskirts (Arbanasi and Stanovi) as well as Zadar's islands. It is estimated that in the spring of 1944, there were fewer than 4,000 civilians left in the city. Even though the industrial plants and piers were crippled, bombing continued throughout of 1944. Thus, the Germans were forced to establish a port in Zaton near Nin and Ražanac.

By the summer, the center of Zadar had practically ceased to exist. The majority of houses were completely destroyed and their ruins buried the streets. The city was desolate. The period from June to the beginning of October was not marked by any large attacks, but they resumed in the middle of October as German forces abandoned the city. The worst attacks came on the 25th and 30th of that month when the areas of Arbanasi and Brodarica, Jazina, and the Riva Nova waterfront were hit.

The last attacks came on the 31st on the same day that the forces of the Yugoslav Partisans entered Zadar. During the attacks, a number of Partisans were killed in the attack by accident.

== Destruction and casualties ==
The greater part of the city's core was destroyed, including the entire Riva Nova with its 12 Austro-Hungarian palaces, its post office and neighborhood blocks around the Forum, the Kalelarga, the school near the Church of St. Chrysogonus, the churches of St. Mary, Our Lady of Health, and the baptistery of the Cathedral of St. Anastasia. Only the churches were restored. Many buildings which had burned were not rebuilt but demolished, with their stone reused in the rebuilding of the coastline and roads. A well-known example of this was the Giuseppe Verdi Theatre, which was only slightly damaged, but was plundered by Communist forces and destroyed. War and postwar damage occurred mostly in the western part of the peninsula, where the government offices and piers were located. The Varoš, was one of the areas where the prewar appearance was retained.

Apart from the destruction caused by the Allies, the withdrawing Germans mined the Riva Nova, slowing down postwar recovery as well as causing casualties. Exact numbers will likely never be known, as Zadar saw a significant population change. The percentage of Croatian citizens dramatically increased. The number of military personnel remaining in the city is undetermined.

After the war, the number of casualties became a political question, especially within the community of Italians who had left the city for Italy. They placed the number at 3,000-4,000 deaths, claiming that genocide had been carried out against them. Most sources place the count at 1,000 deaths, as a big part of the population escaped after the first attacks in fall and winter, 1943.

== See also ==
- Yugoslav People's Liberation War
- USAAF
- Yugoslav Partisans
