= Sušac =

Island of Croatia

Coordinates: 42°46′N 16°31′E

Map

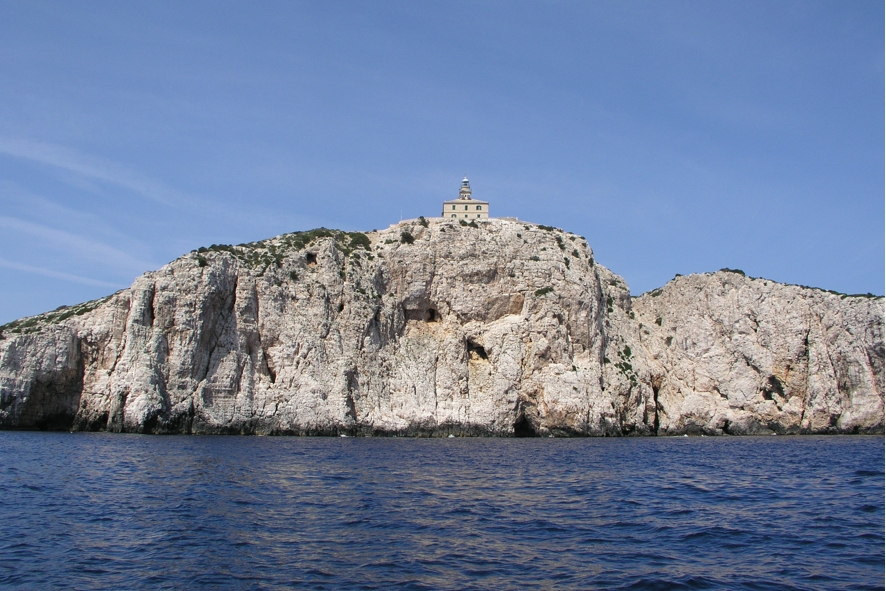
Image of Svjetionik Sušac

Sušac (Croatian pronunciation: [sǔːʃat͡s]) is a small rocky island in the Adriatic Sea with an area of 4.03 km^{2}, and 16.4 km of coastline southwest of Korčula and Lastovo, on the halfway to the island of Vis, in Croatia. The coast consists of slopes and cliffs over 100 m tall, but the opposite side features a natural harbour. A 19th-century lighthouse is built on top of the island. The island is also known for its little lake, which is connected to the sea through a siphon 15 m deep.
