= SS Cattaro (1920) =

History
- Name: Hunyad (1920–33); Jugoslavija 1933–41; Cattaro (1941–45); Jugoslavija 1945–47
- Owner: Jadranska Plovidba (1920–41); Regia Marina (1941–43); Kriegsmarine (1943–45); Jadranska Plovidba (1945–47); Jadranska Linijska Plovidba (1947)
- Operator: Jadranska Plovidba (1933–41); Regia Marina (1941–43); Kriegsmarine (1943–44)
- Port of registry: (Kingdom of Yugoslavia) Split, Yugoslavia (1933–41); Regia Marina (1941–43); Kriegsmarine (1943–45); (Socialist Federal Republic of Yugoslavia) Rijeka, Yugoslavia (1945–47)
- Builder: Ganz & Co / Cantieri Navale del Quarnero
- Yard number: 68
- Laid down: 1914
- Launched: 1920
- Completed: February 1933
- Identification: Code Letters YTLQ (1934–41, 1945–47)
- Fate: Scrapped 1947

General characteristics
- Type: Passenger ship
- Tonnage: 1,275 GRT, 628 NRT
- Length: 78.50 metres (257 ft 7 in)
- Beam: 10.45 metres (34 ft 3 in)
- Draught: 4.11 metres (13 ft 6 in)
- Depth: 4.17 metres (13 ft 8 in)
- Installed power: Quadruple expansion steam engine
- Propulsion: Twin screw propellers
- Speed: 14.5 knots (26.9 km/h)

Cattaro was a Yugoslavian passenger ship which was laid down in 1914 as the Austro-Hungarian Hunyad. However, construction was delayed due to the First World War and she was not launched until 1920. The vessel was then laid up and not completed until February 1932, entering service as Jugoslavija. She was seized by the Italians in 1941 and was put into service as the auxiliary cruiser Cattaro. She was scuttled in 1943 but was raised by the Germans, repaired and entered Kriegsmarine service. She was again scuttled in March 1944 and suffered further damage in June 1944. Raised in 1945 and returned to her former owners and name, the ship was scrapped at Split, Yugoslavia in 1947.

== Description ==
The ship was 78.50 metres (257 ft 7 in) long, with a beam of 10.45 metres (34 ft 3 in). She had a depth of 4.17 metres (13 ft 8 in), and a draught of 4.11 metres (13 ft 6 in). The ship was powered by an eight-cylinder quadruple expansion steam engine, which had two cylinders each of 34 centimetres (13.5 in), 50 centimetres (19.5 in), 71 centimetres (28 in) and 100 centimetres (40 in) diameter by 71 centimetres (28 in) stroke. The engine was built by Harland & Wolff, Belfast, United Kingdom. Driving twin screw propellers, it could propel the ship at 14.5 knots (26.9 km/h).

== History ==
Hunyad was laid down in 1914 as yard number 68 by Ganz & Co, Fiume, Austria Hungary. Due to the First World War, construction was halted. She was launched in 1920. Post-war, the hull had been declared to belong to Yugoslavia. Her owners, Jadranska Plovidba did not have her completed for many years. She was laid up at Fiume. She was completed by Cantieri Navale del Quarnero, Fiume in February 1933 and was named Jugoslavija. Her port of registry was Split. The Code Letters YTLQ were allocated in 1934.

In 1941, Jugoslavija was seized by the Italians. She was placed into service as the auxiliary cruiser Cattaro in 1942 with the Pennant Number D36. On 9 September 1943, she was scuttled at "Santa Margharita". Cattaro was raised by the Germans, repaired and returned to service. She was scuttled at Livorno, Italy on 22 March 1944 and was further damaged in an air raid on 14 June. In 1945, ownership of the vessel was transferred back to Jadranska Plovidba and she regained her former name Jugoslavija. The company was renamed Jadranska Linijska Plovidba in 1947, the same year that the ship was scrapped at Split.
