= Province of Cattaro =

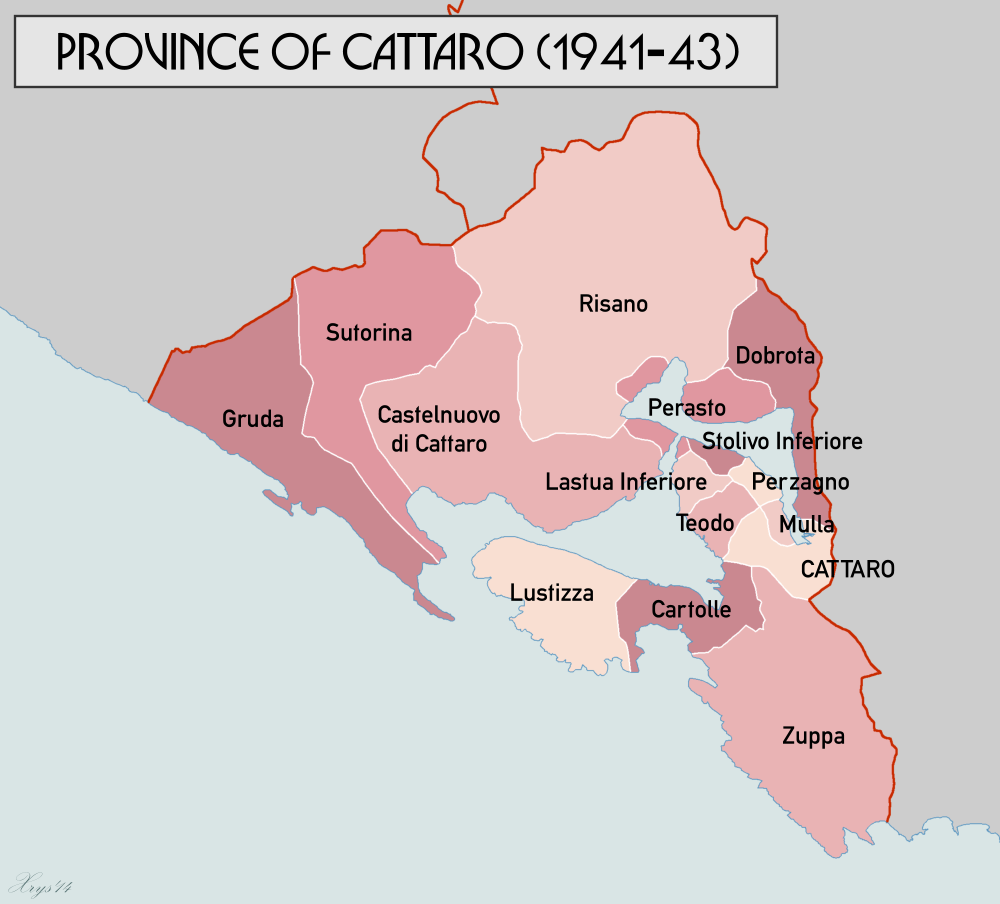
Detailed map of the Italian Province of Cattaro

Province of Cattaro (Italian: Provincia di Cattaro) was a province of the Italian Governorate of Dalmatia, created in May 1941 during World War II (by the "Regio Decreto Legge del 18 maggio 1941"). It lasted until September 1943.

== History ==
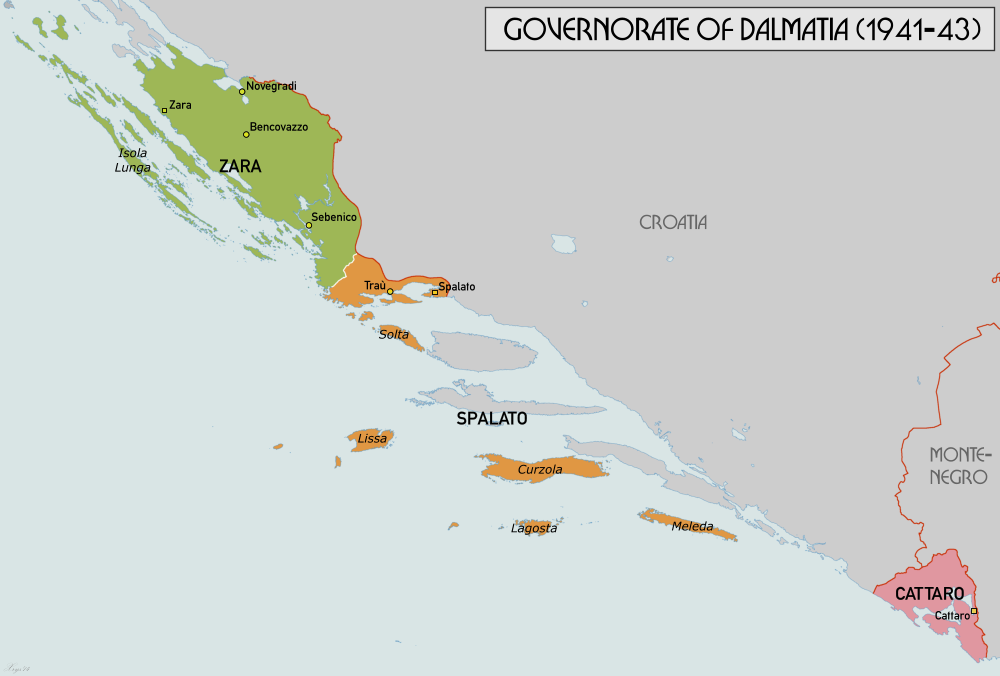
Italian Governorate of Dalmatia

In April 1941, the Italians conquered coastal Dalmatia from the Kingdom of Yugoslavia. They created some provinces in that region that lasted until September 1943. One was the "Province of Cattaro", around the "Gulf of Cattaro". The administrative capital was the city of Cattaro (now Kotor).

The province (subdivided in 15 "Comuni") had an area of 547 km^{2} and a population of 39,800 inhabitants. Prior to the war in 1931, the area consisted out of 13,000 Croats and 18,000 other (mostly Montenegrins and Serbs). with a Dalmatian Italians minority.

The Italians in summer 1941 improved the region by building hospitals and infrastructure, but started a process of Italianization (related to the history of Venetian Albania & the Republic of Venice). Because of this, after one year of peaceful administration & control, in summer 1942 there was a small insurrection against the Italian conquest, but without huge consequences until summer 1943.

In September 1943, the German army took control of the region from the Italians, who had surrendered to the Allies, and soon started a terrible guerrilla war between the Nazi occupiers and Josip Broz Tito's partisans. The province was abolished in the same September.

== Administrative subdivision ==
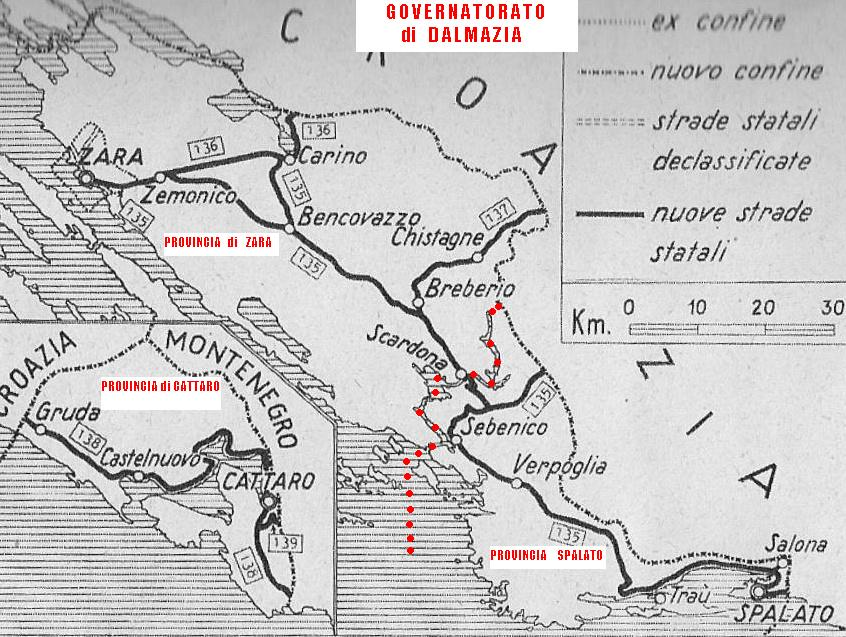
Map of the province of Cattaro

The 15 comuni were (first in Italian the official name and then in Croatian and Serbian the actual):

- Cattaro / Kotor
- Cartolle / Krtole
- Castelnuovo di Cattaro / Herceg Novi
- Dobroto / Dobrota
- Gruda / Gruda
- Lastua Inferiore / Donja Lastva
- Lustizza / Luštica
- Mulla / Muo
- Perasto / Perast
- Perzagno / Prčanj
- Risano / Risan
- Stolivo Inferiore / Donji Stoliv
- Sutorina / Sutorina
- Teodo / Tivat
- Zuppa / Grbalj

== See also ==
- Governorate of Dalmatia
- Province of Spalato
- Province of Zara

== Bibliography ==
- Rodogno, Davide. Il nuovo ordine mediterraneo, ed. Bollati Boringhieri, Turin, 2003
