= Mussolini government =

59th Government of Kingdom of Italy

- 59th Cabinet of Italy

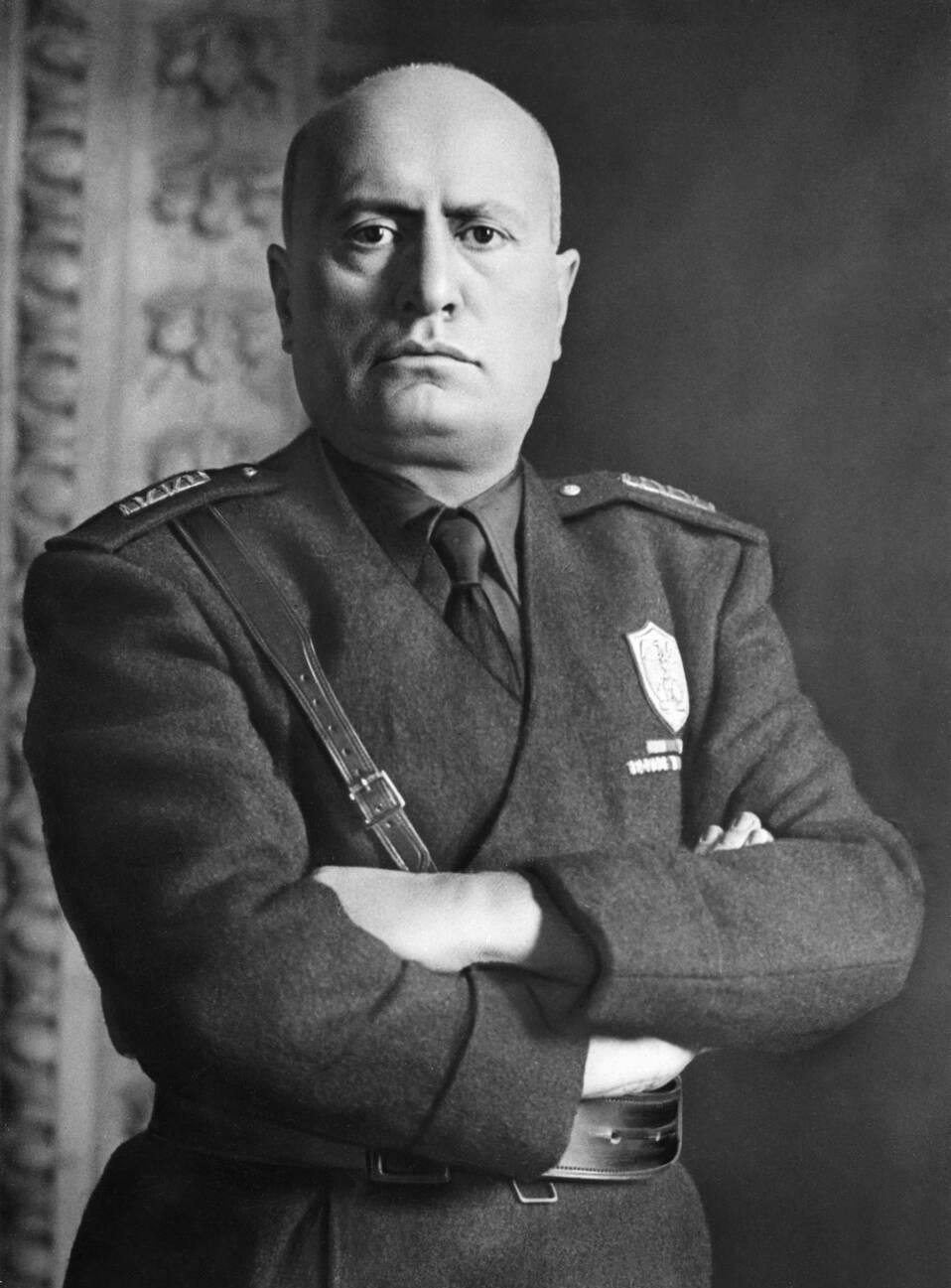
- Date formed: 31 October 1922
- Date dissolved: 25 July 1943

People and organisations
- Head of state: Victor Emmanuel III
- Head of government: Benito Mussolini
- Member party: 1922–24: PNF, PPI, PLI, DS, ANI; 1924–43: PNF

History
- Elections: 1924; 1929; 1934
- Predecessor: Facta II Cabinet
- Successor: Badoglio I Cabinet (official); Mussolini Cabinet (in the RSI)

The Mussolini government was the longest-lasting government in the history of Italy. The Cabinet administered the country from 31 October 1922 to 25 July 1943, for a total of 7,572 days, or 20 years, 8 months and 25 days.

On taking office, the government was composed by members from National Fascist Party, Italian People's Party, Social Democracy, Italian Liberal Party, Italian Nationalist Association and other independent politicians. However, since 1 July 1924, all other parties were purged and the government was composed exclusively of Fascists, except for a few military officers.

The government fell following the approval of the Grandi motion by the Grand Council of Fascism on 25 July 1943.

== Government parties ==
=== From 1922 to 1924 ===
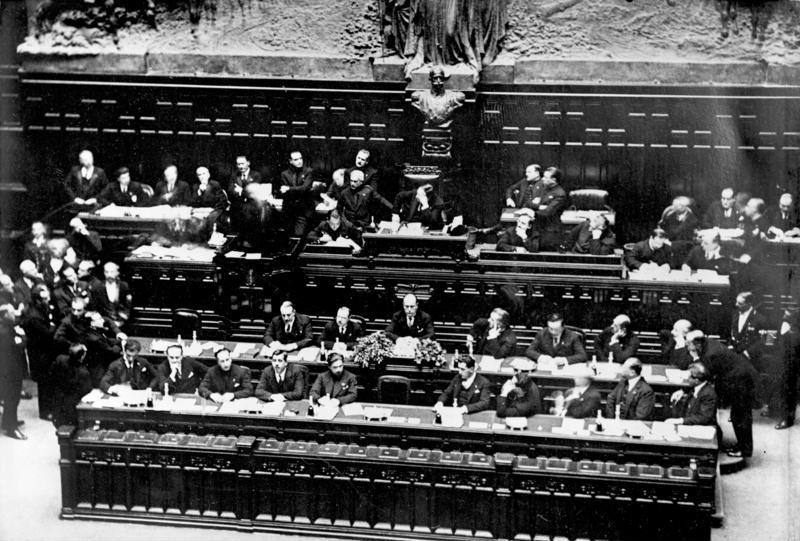
The Mussolini government in the Chamber of Deputies (1930)

From its beginnings until 1924, the government was composed by the following parties:

Party	Ideology	Leader
National Fascist Party	Fascism	Benito Mussolini
Italian People's Party	Christian democracy	Luigi Sturzo
Italian Liberal Party	Liberalism	Giovanni Giolitti
Social Democracy	Social liberalism	Giovanni Antonio Colonna
Italian Nationalist Association	Nationalism	Enrico Corradini

=== From 1924 to 1943 ===
Until July 1, 1924, the government was made up of fascist, popular, liberal and nationalist exponents. From 1924 to 1943, with the transformation of Italy into a one-party totalitarian dictatorship, the government was composed only by members of the National Fascist Party.

Party	Ideology	Leader
National Fascist Party	Fascism	Benito Mussolini

== Composition ==
Office	Name	Party	Term
Head of Government	Benito Mussolini	National Fascist Party	31 October 1922 – 25 July 1943
Minister of Foreign Affairs	Benito Mussolini (ad interim)	National Fascist Party	31 October 1922 – 12 September 1929
Minister of Foreign Affairs	Dino Grandi	National Fascist Party	12 September 1929 – 20 July 1932
Minister of Foreign Affairs	Benito Mussolini (ad interim)	National Fascist Party	20 July 1932 – 11 June 1936
Minister of Foreign Affairs	Galeazzo Ciano	National Fascist Party	11 June 1936 – 6 February 1943
Minister of Foreign Affairs	Benito Mussolini (ad interim)	National Fascist Party	6 February 1943 – 25 July 1943
Minister of the Interior	Benito Mussolini (ad interim)	National Fascist Party	31 October 1922 – 17 June 1924
Minister of the Interior	Luigi Federzoni	National Fascist Party	17 June 1924 – 6 November 1926
Minister of the Interior	Benito Mussolini (ad interim)	National Fascist Party	6 November 1926 – 25 July 1943
Minister of Public Works	Gabriello Carnazza	Social Democracy	31 October 1922 – 1 July 1924
Minister of Public Works	Gino Sarrocchi	National Fascist Party	1 July 1924 – 5 January 1925
Minister of Public Works	Giovanni Giuriati	National Fascist Party	5 January 1925 – 30 April 1929
Minister of Public Works	Benito Mussolini (ad interim)	National Fascist Party	30 April 1929 – 12 September 1929
Minister of Public Works	Michele Bianchi	National Fascist Party	12 September 1929 – 3 February 1930 †
Minister of Public Works	Araldo di Crollalanza	National Fascist Party	13 February 1930 – 24 January 1935
Minister of Public Works	Luigi Razza	National Fascist Party	24 January 1935 – 7 August 1935 †
Minister of Public Works	Giuseppe Cobolli Gigli	National Fascist Party	5 September 1935 – 31 October 1939
Minister of Public Works	Adelchi Serena	National Fascist Party	31 October 1939 – 30 October 1940
Minister of Public Works	Giuseppe Gorla	National Fascist Party	30 October 1940 – 6 February 1943
Minister of Public Works	Zenone Benini	National Fascist Party	6 February 1943 – 25 July 1943
Minister of Treasury	Vincenzo Tangorra	Italian People's Party	31 October 1922 – 21 December 1922
Minister of Treasury	Alberto de' Stefani	National Fascist Party	21 December 1922 – 31 December 1922
Minister of Labour and Social Security	Stefano Cavazzoni	Italian People's Party	31 October 1922 – 26 April 1923
Minister of Agriculture	Giuseppe De Capitani D'Arzago	Italian Liberal Party	31 October 1922 – 1 August 1923
Minister of Industry and Commerce	Teofilo Rossi	Italian Liberal Party	31 October 1922 – 1 August 1923
Minister of National Economy	Orso Mario Corbino	Italian Liberal Party	1 August 1923 – 1 July 1924
Minister of National Economy	Cesare Nava	National Fascist Party	1 July 1924 – 10 July 1925
Minister of National Economy	Giuseppe Belluzzo	National Fascist Party	10 July 1925 – 9 July 1928
Minister of National Economy	Alessandro Martelli	National Fascist Party	9 July 1928 – 12 September 1929
Minister of Justice and Worship Affairs	Aldo Oviglio	National Fascist Party	31 October 1922 – 5 January 1925
Minister of Justice and Worship Affairs	Alfredo Rocco	National Fascist Party	5 January 1925 – 19 July 1932
Minister of Grace and Justice	Pietro De Francisci	National Fascist Party	20 July 1932 – 24 January 1935
Minister of Grace and Justice	Arrigo Solmi	National Fascist Party	24 January 1935 – 12 July 1939
Minister of Grace and Justice	Dino Grandi	National Fascist Party	12 July 1939 – 6 February 1943
Minister of Grace and Justice	Alfredo De Marsico	National Fascist Party	6 February 1943 – 25 July 1943
Minister of War	Armando Diaz	Military	31 October 1922 – 30 April 1924
Minister of War	Antonino Di Giorgio	National Fascist Party	30 April 1924 – 4 April 1925
Minister of War	Benito Mussolini (ad interim)	National Fascist Party	4 April 1925 – 12 September 1929
Minister of War	Pietro Gazzera	National Fascist Party	12 September 1929 – 22 July 1933
Minister of War	Benito Mussolini (ad interim)	National Fascist Party	22 July 1933 – 25 July 1943
Minister of the Navy	Paolo Thaon di Revel	Military	31 October 1922 – 8 May 1925
Minister of the Navy	Benito Mussolini (ad interim)	National Fascist Party	8 May 1925 – 12 September 1929
Minister of the Navy	Giuseppe Sirianni	National Fascist Party	12 September 1929 – 6 November 1933
Minister of the Navy	Benito Mussolini (ad interim)	National Fascist Party	6 November 1933 – 25 July 1943
Minister of Public Education	Giovanni Gentile	Independent	31 October 1922 – 1 July 1924
Minister of Public Education	Alessandro Casati	Independent	1 July 1924 – 5 January 1925
Minister of Public Education	Pietro Fedele	National Fascist Party	5 January 1925 – 9 July 1928
Minister of Public Education	Giuseppe Belluzzo	National Fascist Party	9 July 1928 – 12 September 1929
Minister of National Education	Balbino Giuliano	National Fascist Party	12 September 1929 – 20 July 1932
Minister of National Education	Francesco Ercole	National Fascist Party	20 July 1932 – 24 January 1935
Minister of National Education	Cesare Maria De Vecchi	National Fascist Party	24 January 1935 – 15 November 1936
Minister of National Education	Giuseppe Bottai	National Fascist Party	15 November 1936 – 5 February 1943
Minister of National Education	Carlo Alberto Biggini	National Fascist Party	5 February 1943 – 25 July 1943
Minister of the Colonies	Luigi Federzoni	Italian Nationalist Association	31 October 1922 – 17 June 1924
Minister of the Colonies	Benito Mussolini (ad interim)	National Fascist Party	17 June 1924 – 1 July 1924
Minister of the Colonies	Pietro Lanza di Scalea	National Fascist Party	1 July 1924 – 6 November 1926
Minister of the Colonies	Luigi Federzoni	National Fascist Party	6 November 1926 – 18 December 1928
Minister of the Colonies	Benito Mussolini (ad interim)	National Fascist Party	18 December 1928 – 12 September 1929
Minister of the Colonies	Emilio De Bono	National Fascist Party	12 September 1929 – 17 January 1935
Minister of the Colonies	Benito Mussolini (ad interim)	National Fascist Party	17 January 1935 – 11 June 1936
Minister of Italian Africa	Alessandro Lessona	National Fascist Party	11 June 1936 – 20 November 1937
Minister of Italian Africa	Benito Mussolini (ad interim)	National Fascist Party	20 November 1937 – 31 October 1939
Minister of Italian Africa	Attilio Teruzzi	National Fascist Party	31 October 1939 – 25 July 1943
Minister of Finance	Alberto de' Stefani	National Fascist Party	31 October 1922 – 10 July 1925
Minister of Finance	Giuseppe Volpi	National Fascist Party	10 July 1925 – 9 July 1928
Minister of Finance	Antonio Mosconi	National Fascist Party	9 July 1928 – 20 July 1932
Minister of Finance	Guido Jung	National Fascist Party	20 July 1932 – 24 January 1935
Minister of Finance	Paolo Ignazio Maria Thaon di Revel	National Fascist Party	24 January 1935 – 6 February 1943
Minister of Finance	Giacomo Acerbo	National Fascist Party	6 February 1943 – 25 July 1943
Minister of Post and Telegraphs	Giovanni Antonio Colonna	Social Democracy	31 October 1922 – 5 February 1924
Minister of Post and Telegraphs	Costanzo Ciano	National Fascist Party	5 February 1924 – 3 March 1924
Minister of Communications	Costanzo Ciano	National Fascist Party	3 March 1924 – 30 April 1934
Minister of Communications	Umberto Puppini	National Fascist Party	30 April 1934 – 24 January 1935
Minister of Communications	Antonio Stefano Benni	National Fascist Party	24 January 1935 – 31 October 1939
Minister of Communications	Giovanni Host-Venturi	National Fascist Party	31 October 1939 – 6 February 1943
Minister of Communications	Vittorio Cini	National Fascist Party	6 February 1943 – 24 July 1943
Minister of Communications	Giuseppe Peverelli	National Fascist Party	24 July 1943 – 25 July 1943
Minister for the Lands freed by the Enemy	Giovanni Giuriati	National Fascist Party	31 October 1922 – 1 March 1923
Minister of the Air Force	Benito Mussolini (ad interim)	National Fascist Party	30 August 1925 – 12 September 1929
Minister of the Air Force	Italo Balbo	National Fascist Party	12 September 1929 – 6 November 1933
Minister of the Air Force	Benito Mussolini (ad interim)	National Fascist Party	6 November 1933 – 25 July 1943
Minister of Corporations	Benito Mussolini (ad interim)	National Fascist Party	2 July 1926 – 12 September 1929
Minister of Corporations	Giuseppe Bottai	National Fascist Party	12 September 1929 – 20 July 1932
Minister of Corporations	Benito Mussolini (ad interim)	National Fascist Party	20 July 1932 – 11 June 1936
Minister of Corporations	Ferruccio Lantini	National Fascist Party	11 June 1936 – 31 October 1939
Minister of Corporations	Renato Ricci	National Fascist Party	31 October 1939 – 6 February 1943
Minister of Corporations	Carlo Tiengo	National Fascist Party	6 February 1943 – 18 April 1943
Minister of Corporations	Tullio Cianetti	National Fascist Party	18 April 1943 – 25 July 1943
Minister of Agriculture and Forests	Giacomo Acerbo	National Fascist Party	12 September 1929 – 24 January 1935
Minister of Agriculture and Forests	Edmondo Rossoni	National Fascist Party	24 January 1935 – 31 October 1939
Minister of Agriculture and Forests	Giuseppe Tassinari	National Fascist Party	31 October 1939 – 26 December 1941
Minister of Agriculture and Forests	Carlo Pareschi	National Fascist Party	26 December 1941 – 25 July 1943
Minister of Press and Propaganda	Galeazzo Ciano	National Fascist Party	26 June 1935 – 11 June 1936
Minister of Press and Propaganda	Dino Alfieri	National Fascist Party	11 June 1936 – 27 May 1937
Minister of Popular Culture	Dino Alfieri	National Fascist Party	27 May 1937 – 31 October 1939
Minister of Popular Culture	Alessandro Pavolini	National Fascist Party	31 October 1939 – 6 February 1943
Minister of Popular Culture	Gaetano Polverelli	National Fascist Party	6 February 1943 – 25 July 1943
Minister of the National Fascist Party	Achille Starace	National Fascist Party	11 January 1937 – 31 October 1939
Minister of the National Fascist Party	Ettore Muti	National Fascist Party	31 October 1939 – 30 October 1940
Minister of the National Fascist Party	Adelchi Serena	National Fascist Party	30 October 1940 – 26 December 1941
Minister of the National Fascist Party	Aldo Vidussoni	National Fascist Party	26 December 1941 – 19 April 1943
Minister of the National Fascist Party	Carlo Scorza	National Fascist Party	19 April 1943 – 25 July 1943
Minister for Exchanges and Currencies	Felice Guarneri	National Fascist Party	20 November 1937 – 31 October 1939
Minister for Exchanges and Currencies	Raffaello Riccardi	National Fascist Party	31 October 1939 – 6 February 1943
Minister for Exchanges and Currencies	Oreste Bonomi	National Fascist Party	6 February 1943 – 25 July 1943
Minister of War Production	Carlo Favagrossa	National Fascist Party	6 February 1943 – 25 July 1943
Secretary of the Council of Ministers	Giacomo Acerbo	National Fascist Party	31 October 1922 – 3 July 1924
Secretary of the Council of Ministers	Giacomo Suardo	National Fascist Party	2 July 1924 – 21 December 1927
Secretary of the Council of Ministers	Francesco Giunta	National Fascist Party	21 December 1927 – 20 July 1932
Secretary of the Council of Ministers	Edmondo Rossoni	National Fascist Party	20 July 1932 – 24 January 1935
Secretary of the Council of Ministers	Giacomo Medici Del Vascello	National Fascist Party	24 January 1935 – 31 October 1939
Secretary of the Council of Ministers	Luigi Russo	National Fascist Party	31 October 1939 – 6 February 1943
Secretary of the Council of Ministers	Amilcare Rossi	National Fascist Party	6 February 1943 – 25 July 1943
