= Grand Council of Fascism =

Kingdom of Italy government body, 1928–1943

- Gran Consiglio del Fascismo
- Coat of arms
- Abbreviation: GCF
- Formation: First meeting 15 December 1922; State body 9 December 1928
- Dissolved: 5 August 1943
- Legal status: Party governing body (1922–1928); Constitutional body (from 1928)
- Headquarters: Palazzo Venezia, Rome
- Official language: Italian
- King of Italy: Victor Emmanuel III
- Duce of Fascism: Benito Mussolini
- Secretary of the Council: Party Secretary
- Main organ: National Fascist Party

The Grand Council of Fascism (Italian: Gran Consiglio del Fascismo, also translated "Fascist Grand Council") was the main body of Mussolini's government in the Kingdom of Italy, which held and applied great power to control the institutions of government. It was created as a body of the National Fascist Party in 1922, and became a state body on 9 December 1928. The council usually met at the Palazzo Venezia, Rome, which was also the seat of the head of the Italian government. The Council became extinct following a series of events in 1943, in which Benito Mussolini was voted out as the Prime Minister of Italy.

== Powers of the Council ==
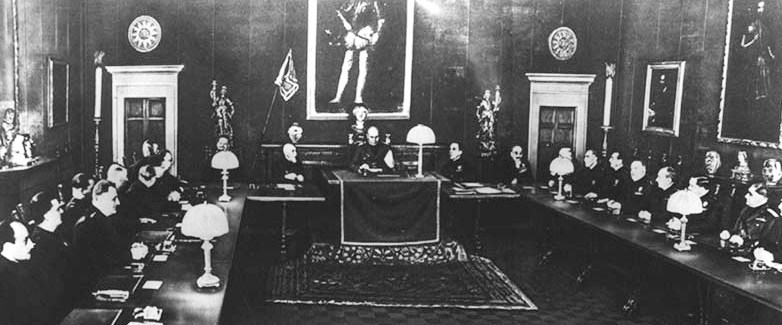
The session of the Grand Council of 9 May 1936, where the Empire was proclaimed.

Essentially, the council held these powers:

- The power to elect the Fascist Party deputies, the nomination for the Party Secretary and other party leaders, the approval of the party statutes and the power regarding the party's policy.
- The power to elect the Crown's line of succession including the choice of the heir to the throne, the right of the Crown, the power to choose possible successors to the Prime Minister, the power to choose the function and membership of the Grand Council, the Senate, the Chamber of Deputies (later the Chamber of Fasces and Corporations), the power to decide the rights and powers of the Prime Minister, international Treaties, and foreign affairs.

The Grand Council meetings were convened by the Prime Minister himself, and all decrees and laws could only be legalized after receiving his approval. In contrast to the Führerprinzip government model in Nazi Germany, the Grand Council retained the power to recommend that the King of Italy remove the Prime Minister from office. As all the former governing institutions had been subordinated to the Fascist Party, the Council was the only check on Mussolini's power.

== Overthrow of Mussolini ==
The Allies invaded Sicily in July 1943. Grand Council member Dino Grandi proposed a vote of no confidence in Mussolini as leader of the Council and the party. A vote was held on the night of 24–25 July 1943 and passed with 19 votes for, 8 against and one abstention. Among the 19 votes of no confidence were those of Mussolini's son-in-law Galeazzo Ciano, who had been former minister of foreign affairs, and the influential marshal Emilio De Bono.

The following day King Victor Emmanuel met Mussolini and informed him that General Pietro Badoglio would lead Italy, as Prime Minister. Mussolini was arrested immediately after the meeting.

In September 1943 Mussolini was freed from imprisonment by German commandos and helped to regain power in northern Italy. He had those who voted against him tried for treason at the Verona trial. All of them were found guilty, with all but one of them being sentenced to death. However, only Giovanni Marinelli, Carlo Pareschi, Luciano Gottardi, Ciano, De Bono, and Tullio Cianetti, were physically present for the trial. With the exception of Cianetti, those present were all executed by firing squad on the morning of 11 January 1944.

== Members of the Council ==
The composition of the Council was revised and defined by a law of 14 December 1929 and became a state body from 9 December 1928. Its members, selected among the party's gerarchi, are below. Their vote on the 25 July 1943 motion to depose Mussolini is also given next to their name.

=== President of the Council ===
Head of Government and Duce of Fascism
Portrait	Name (born–died)	Term of office			25 July 1943 Motion
Portrait	Name (born–died)	Took office	Left office	Time in office	25 July 1943 Motion
	Benito Mussolini (1883–1945)	31 October 1922	25 July 1943	20 years, 267 days	Deposed

=== Quadrumvirs ===
The Quadrumvirs
Portrait	Name (born–died)	Term of office			25 July 1943 Motion
Portrait	Name (born–died)	Took office	Left office	Time in office	25 July 1943 Motion
	Italo Balbo (1896–1940)	27 October 1922	28 June 1940	17 years, 245 days	Died in office
	Michele Bianchi (1883–1930)	27 October 1922	3 February 1930	7 years, 99 days	Died in office
	Emilio De Bono (1866–1944)	27 October 1922	25 July 1943	20 years, 271 days	Yes
	Cesare Maria De Vecchi (1884–1959)	27 October 1922	25 July 1943	20 years, 271 days	Yes

=== Parliament ===
President of the Senate
Portrait	Name (born–died)	Term of office			25 July 1943 Motion
Portrait	Name (born–died)	Took office	Left office	Time in office	25 July 1943 Motion
	Tommaso Tittoni (1855–1931)	1 December 1919	21 January 1929	9 years, 51 days	—
	Luigi Federzoni (1878–1967)	29 April 1929	2 March 1939	9 years, 307 days	Voted
	Giacomo Suardo (1883–1947)	15 March 1939	25 July 1943	4 years, 132 days	Abstention

President of the Chamber of Fasces and Corporations (Note: President of the Chamber of Deputies until 1939.)
Portrait	Name (born–died)	Term of office			25 July 1943 Motion
Portrait	Name (born–died)	Took office	Left office	Time in office	25 July 1943 Motion
	Alfredo Rocco (1875–1935)	24 May 1924	5 January 1925	226 days	—
	Antonio Casertano (1863–1938)	13 January 1925	25 January 1929	4 years, 12 days	—
	Giovanni Giuriati (1876–1970)	20 April 1929	19 January 1934	4 years, 274 days	—
	Costanzo Ciano (1876–1939)	28 April 1934	26 June 1939	5 years, 59 days	Died in office
	Dino Grandi (1895–1988)	30 November 1939	25 July 1943	3 years, 237 days	Yes

=== Positions in the Cabinet ===
Minister of Agriculture and Forests
Portrait	Name (born–died)	Term of office			25 July 1943 Motion
Portrait	Name (born–died)	Took office	Left office	Time in office	25 July 1943 Motion
	Giacomo Acerbo (1888–1969)	12 September 1929	24 January 1935	5 years, 134 days	Voted
	Edmondo Rossoni (1884–1965)	24 January 1935	31 October 1939	4 years, 280 days	Voted
	Giuseppe Tassinari (1891–1944)	31 October 1939	26 December 1941	2 years, 56 days	—
	Carlo Pareschi (1898–1944)	26 December 1941	25 July 1943	1 year, 211 days	Yes

Minister of Corporations
Portrait	Name (born–died)	Term of office			25 July 1943 Motion
Portrait	Name (born–died)	Took office	Left office	Time in office	25 July 1943 Motion
	Duce	2 July 1926	12 September 1929	3 years, 72 days	—
	Undersecretary; Giacomo Suardo (1883–1947)	2 July 1926	6 November 1926	127 days	Voted
	Undersecretary; Giuseppe Bottai (1895–1959)	6 November 1926	12 September 1929	2 years, 310 days	Voted
	Giuseppe Bottai (1895–1959)	12 September 1929	20 July 1932	2 years, 312 days	Voted
	Duce	20 July 1932	11 June 1936	3 years, 327 days	—
	Undersecretary; Alberto Asquini (1889–1972)	20 July 1932	24 January 1935	2 years, 188 days	—
	Undersecretary; Bruno Biagi (1889–1947)	20 July 1932	24 January 1935	2 years, 188 days	—
	Undersecretary; Ferruccio Lantini (1886–1959)	24 January 1935	11 June 1936	1 year, 139 days	Note
	Ferruccio Lantini (1886–1959)	11 June 1936	31 October 1939	3 years, 142 days	Note
	Renato Ricci (1896–1956)	31 October 1939	6 February 1943	3 years, 98 days	Note
	Carlo Tiengo (1882–1945)	6 February 1943	19 April 1943	72 days	—
	Tullio Cianetti (1899–1976)	19 April 1943	25 July 1943	97 days	Yes

Minister of Finance
Portrait	Name (born–died)	Term of office			25 July 1943 Motion
Portrait	Name (born–died)	Took office	Left office	Time in office	25 July 1943 Motion
	Alberto de' Stefani (1879–1969)	31 October 1922	10 July 1925	2 years, 252 days	Voted
	Giuseppe Volpi (1877–1947)	10 July 1925	9 July 1928	2 years, 365 days	—
	Antonio Mosconi (1866–1955)	9 July 1928	20 July 1932	4 years, 11 days	Note
	Guido Jung (1876–1949)	20 July 1932	17 January 1935	2 years, 181 days	—
	Paolo Thaon di Revel (1888–1973)	17 January 1935	6 February 1943	8 years, 20 days	Note
	Giacomo Acerbo (1888–1969)	6 February 1943	25 July 1943	169 days	Yes

Minister of Foreign Affairs
Portrait	Name (born–died)	Term of office			25 July 1943 Motion
Portrait	Name (born–died)	Took office	Left office	Time in office	25 July 1943 Motion
	Duce	31 October 1922	12 September 1929	6 years, 316 days	—
	Undersecretary; Ernesto Vassallo (1875–1940)	31 October 1922	27 April 1923	178 days	—
	Undersecretary; Dino Grandi (1895–1988)	12 September 1929	20 July 1932	4 years, 121 days	Voted
	Dino Grandi (1895–1988)	12 September 1929	20 July 1932	2 years, 312 days	Voted
	Duce	20 July 1932	9 June 1936	3 years, 325 days	—
	Undersecretary; Fulvio Suvich (1887–1980)	20 July 1932	9 June 1936	3 years, 325 days	Note
	Galeazzo Ciano (1903–1944)	9 June 1936	6 February 1943	6 years, 242 days	Voted
	Duce	6 February 1943	25 July 1943	169 days	—
	Undersecretary; Giuseppe Bastianini (1889–1961)	6 February 1943	25 July 1943	169 days	Yes

Minister of the Interior
Portrait	Name (Born–Died)	Term of office			25 July 1943 Motion
Portrait	Name (Born–Died)	Took office	Left office	Time in office	25 July 1943 Motion
	Duce	31 October 1922	17 June 1924	1 year, 230 days	—
	Undersecretary; Aldo Finzi (1891–1944)	31 October 1922	17 June 1924	1 year, 230 days	—
	Luigi Federzoni (1878–1967)	17 June 1924	6 November 1926	2 years, 142 days	Voted
	Duce	6 November 1926	25 July 1943	16 years, 261 days	—
	Undersecretary; Giacomo Suardo (1883–1947)	6 November 1926	13 March 1928	1 year, 128 days	Voted
	Undersecretary; Michele Bianchi (1882–1930)	13 March 1928	12 September 1929	1 year, 183 days	—
	Undersecretary; Leandro Arpinati (1892–1945)	12 September 1929	8 May 1933	3 years, 238 days	Note
	Undersecretary; Guido Buffarini Guidi (1895–1945)	8 May 1933	6 February 1943	9 years, 274 days	Voted
	Undersecretary; Umberto Albini (1895–1973)	6 February 1943	25 July 1943	169 days	Yes

Minister of Grace and Justice (Note: Minister of Justice and Worship Affairs before 1932.)
Portrait	Name (born–died)	Term of office			25 July 1943 Motion
Portrait	Name (born–died)	Took office	Left office	Time in office	25 July 1943 Motion
	Aldo Oviglio (1873–1942)	31 October 1922	5 January 1925	2 years, 66 days	—
	Alfredo Rocco (1875–1935)	5 January 1925	20 July 1932	7 years, 197 days	—
	Pietro De Francisci (1883–1971)	20 July 1932	24 January 1935	2 years, 188 days	—
	Arrigo Solmi (1873–1944)	24 January 1935	12 July 1939	4 years, 169 days	Note
	Dino Grandi (1895–1988)	12 July 1939	5 February 1943	3 years, 208 days	Voted
	Alfredo De Marsico (1888–1985)	5 February 1943	25 July 1943	170 days	Yes

Minister of Popular Culture (Note: Minister of Press and Propaganda before 1937.)
Portrait	Name (Born–Died)	Term of office			25 July 1943 Motion
Portrait	Name (Born–Died)	Took office	Left office	Time in office	25 July 1943 Motion
	Galeazzo Ciano (1903–1944)	23 June 1935	11 June 1936	354 days	Voted
	Dino Alfieri (1886–1966)	11 June 1936	31 October 1939	3 years, 142 days	Voted
	Alessandro Pavolini (1903–1945)	31 October 1939	6 February 1943	3 years, 98 days	Note
	Gaetano Polverelli (1886–1960)	6 February 1943	25 July 1943	169 days	No

Minister of National Education
Portrait	Name (born–died)	Term of office			25 July 1943 Motion
Portrait	Name (born–died)	Took office	Left office	Time in office	25 July 1943 Motion
	Balbino Giuliano (1879–1958)	12 September 1929	20 July 1932	2 years, 312 days	—
	Francesco Ercole (1884–1945)	20 July 1932	24 January 1935	2 years, 188 days	—
	Cesare Maria De Vecchi (1884–1959)	24 January 1935	15 November 1936	1 year, 296 days	Voted
	Giuseppe Bottai (1895–1959)	15 November 1936	5 February 1943	6 years, 82 days	Voted
	Carlo Alberto Biggini (1902–1945)	5 February 1943	25 July 1943	170 days	No

=== Royal Academy of Italy ===
President of the Royal Academy
Portrait	Name (born–died)	Term of office			25 July 1943 Motion
Portrait	Name (born–died)	Took office	Left office	Time in office	25 July 1943 Motion
	Tommaso Tittoni (1855–1931)	14 December 1929	16 September 1930	276 days	—
	Guglielmo Marconi (1874–1937)	19 September 1930	20 July 1937	6 years, 304 days	Died in office
	Gabriele D'Annunzio (1863–1938)	12 November 1937	1 March 1938	109 days	Died in office
	Luigi Federzoni (1878–1967)	21 April 1938	25 July 1943	5 years, 95 days	Yes

=== Special Court for the Defence of the State ===
President of the Special Court for the Defence of the State
Portrait	Name (born–died)	Term of office			25 July 1943 Motion
Portrait	Name (born–died)	Took office	Left office	Time in office	25 July 1943 Motion
	Guido Cristini (1895–1979)	27 July 1928	28 November 1932	4 years, 124 days	Note
	Antonino Tringali Casanuova (1888–1943)	28 November 1932	25 July 1943	10 years, 239 days	No

=== Secretary of the Party ===
Secretary of the Party
Portrait	Name (born–died)	Term of office			25 July 1943 Motion
Portrait	Name (born–died)	Took office	Left office	Time in office	25 July 1943 Motion
	Michele Bianchi (1883–1930)	10 November 1921	13 October 1923	1 year, 337 days	—
	Francesco Giunta (1887–1971)	13 October 1923	23 April 1924	193 days	—
	Quadrumvirate (Note: Consisted of Roberto Forges Davanzati, Cesare Rossi, Giovanni Marinelli and Alessandro Melchiori.)	23 April 1924	15 February 1925	298 days	—
	Roberto Farinacci (1892–1945)	15 February 1925	30 March 1926	1 year, 43 days	—
	Augusto Turati (1888–1955)	30 March 1926	7 October 1930	4 years, 191 days	—
	Giovanni Giuriati (1876–1970)	7 October 1930	12 December 1931	1 year, 66 days	—
	Achille Starace (1889–1945)	12 December 1931	31 October 1939	7 years, 323 days	—
	Ettore Muti (1902–1943)	31 October 1939	30 October 1940	365 days	—
	Adelchi Serena (1895–1970)	30 October 1940	26 December 1941	1 year, 57 days	—
	Aldo Vidussoni (1914–1982)	26 December 1941	19 April 1943	1 year, 114 days	—
	Carlo Scorza (1897–1988)	19 April 1943	27 July 1943	99 days	No

=== Other posts ===
- The Presidents of the Corporations: Industrialists, Farmers, Industrial Workers, Agriculture Workers.

=== Chief of Staff of the MVSN ===
Chief of Staff of the MVSN
Portrait	Name (born–died)	Term of office			25 July 1943 Motion
Portrait	Name (born–died)	Took office	Left office	Time in office	25 July 1943 Motion
	Francesco Sacco (1877–1958)	1 February 1923	1 December 1924	1 year, 304 days	—
	Enrico Bazan (1864–1947)	1 December 1924	23 December 1928	4 years, 22 days	—
	Attilio Teruzzi (1882–1950)	2 January 1929	3 October 1935	6 years, 274 days	—
	Luigi Russo (1882–1964)	3 October 1935	3 November 1939	4 years, 31 days	—
	Achille Starace (1889–1945)	3 November 1939	16 May 1941	1 year, 194 days	—
	Enzo Galbiati (1897–1982)	25 May 1941	26 July 1943	2 years, 62 days	No

=== Officeholders who held appointments of a three-year duration ===
President of the Chamber of Fasces and Corporations
Portrait	Name (born–died)	Term of office			25 July 1943 Motion
Portrait	Name (born–died)	Took office	Left office	Time in office	25 July 1943 Motion
	Giovanni Giuriati (1876–1970)	20 April 1929	19 January 1934	4 years, 274 days	—

Minister of Agriculture and Forests
Portrait	Name (born–died)	Term of office			25 July 1943 Motion
Portrait	Name (born–died)	Took office	Left office	Time in office	25 July 1943 Motion
	Edmondo Rossoni (1884–1965)	24 January 1935	31 October 1939	4 years, 280 days	Yes

Minister of Corporations
Portrait	Name (born–died)	Term of office			25 July 1943 Motion
Portrait	Name (born–died)	Took office	Left office	Time in office	25 July 1943 Motion
	Ferruccio Lantini (1886–1959)	11 June 1936	31 October 1939	3 years, 142 days	Resigned from Council
	Renato Ricci (1896–1956)	31 October 1939	6 February 1943	3 years, 98 days	—

Minister of Finance
Portrait	Name (born–died)	Term of office			25 July 1943 Motion
Portrait	Name (born–died)	Took office	Left office	Time in office	25 July 1943 Motion
	Alberto de' Stefani (1879–1969)	31 October 1922	10 July 1925	2 years, 252 days	Voted
	Antonio Mosconi (1866–1955)	9 July 1928	20 July 1932	4 years, 11 days	—
	Paolo Thaon di Revel (1888–1973)	17 January 1935	6 February 1943	8 years, 20 days	—

Minister of Foreign Affairs
Portrait	Name (born–died)	Term of office			25 July 1943 Motion
Portrait	Name (born–died)	Took office	Left office	Time in office	25 July 1943 Motion
	Undersecretary; Fulvio Suvich (1887–1980)	20 July 1932	9 June 1936	3 years, 325 days	—
	Galeazzo Ciano (1903–1944)	9 June 1936	6 February 1943	6 years, 242 days	Yes

Minister of the Interior
Portrait	Name (born–died)	Term of office			25 July 1943 Motion
Portrait	Name (born–died)	Took office	Left office	Time in office	25 July 1943 Motion
	Undersecretary; Leandro Arpinati (1892–1945)	12 September 1929	8 May 1933	3 years, 238 days	—
	Undersecretary; Guido Buffarini Guidi (1895–1945)	8 May 1933	6 February 1943	9 years, 274 days	No

Minister of Grace and Justice
Portrait	Name (born–died)	Term of office			25 July 1943 Motion
Portrait	Name (born–died)	Took office	Left office	Time in office	25 July 1943 Motion
	Arrigo Solmi (1873–1944)	24 January 1935	12 July 1939	4 years, 169 days	—

Minister of Popular Culture
Portrait	Name (born–died)	Term of office			25 July 1943 Motion
Portrait	Name (born–died)	Took office	Left office	Time in office	25 July 1943 Motion
	Dino Alfieri (1886–1966)	11 June 1936	31 October 1939	3 years, 142 days	Yes
	Alessandro Pavolini (1903–1945)	31 October 1939	6 February 1943	3 years, 98 days	—

Minister of National Education
Portrait	Name (born–died)	Term of office			25 July 1943 Motion
Portrait	Name (born–died)	Took office	Left office	Time in office	25 July 1943 Motion
	Giuseppe Bottai (1895–1959)	15 November 1936	5 February 1943	6 years, 82 days	Yes

President of the Special Court for the Defence of the State
Portrait	Name (born–died)	Term of office			25 July 1943 Motion
Portrait	Name (born–died)	Took office	Left office	Time in office	25 July 1943 Motion
	Guido Cristini (1895–1979)	27 July 1928	28 November 1932	4 years, 124 days	—

Secretary of the Party
Portrait	Name (born–died)	Term of office			25 July 1943 Motion
Portrait	Name (born–died)	Took office	Left office	Time in office	25 July 1943 Motion
	Roberto Farinacci (1892–1945)	15 February 1925	30 March 1926	1 year, 43 days	No
	Augusto Turati (1888–1955)	30 March 1926	7 October 1930	4 years, 191 days	—
	Achille Starace (1889–1945)	12 December 1931	31 October 1939	7 years, 323 days	—

Chief of Staff of the MVSN
Portrait	Name (born–died)	Term of office			25 July 1943 Motion
Portrait	Name (born–died)	Took office	Left office	Time in office	25 July 1943 Motion
	Enrico Bazan (1864–1947)	1 December 1924	23 December 1928	4 years, 22 days	—
	Attilio Teruzzi (1882–1950)	2 January 1929	3 October 1935	6 years, 274 days	—
	Luigi Russo (1882–1964)	3 October 1935	3 November 1939	4 years, 31 days	—

== See also ==
- Italian Fascism
- Italian Parliament (1928–1939)
- Movimiento Nacional, governing body of Francoist Spain
