= Italian Parliament (1928–1939) =

Parliament of Italy

Italian Parliament Parlamento Italiano

Type
- Type: Bicameral
- Houses: Senate; Chamber of Deputies

Leadership
- President of the Senate: Luigi Federzoni (1929-1939)
- President of the Chamber of Deputies: Costanzo Ciano (1934-1939); Giovanni Giuriati (1929-1934)

Structure
- Senate political groups: Senators appointed by the Crown on the advice of the Government
- Chamber of Deputies political groups: Employers confederations (125) Employees confederations (89) Liberal professions (82) Public bodies (104)
- Length of term: Life (Senate); 5 years (Chamber of Deputies)

Meeting place
- Senate: Palazzo Madama; Chamber of Deputies: Palazzo Montecitorio

Footnotes
- Composition of both chambers is as of 1934, prior to parliamentary renewal of that year.

The Italian Parliament (1928–1939) was the parliament of Italy as it existed following the constitutional reforms enacted after the 1924 Italian general election. It was, in turn, substantially restructured in 1939. This early Fascist-era legislature was a continuation of the bicameral parliament that had existed prior to 1928, though the character, structure and responsibilities of each house (the Senate and the Chamber of Deputies) were altered to various degrees.

== Chamber of Deputies ==
=== History ===
After passage of the Acerbo Law, and the subsequent consolidation of a two-thirds parliamentary majority by the National Fascist Party, constitutional reforms were implemented reorganizing the Chamber of Deputies. The Law on Political Representation, enacted on May 17, 1928, fundamentally altered composition of the body. Under the new method of election members would not technically be considered "deputies" as they were not delegates from distinct geographic constituencies or political parties but were instead, theoretically, representatives of the whole of the nation. Benito Mussolini acknowledged this as much by remarking that "even the label Chamber of Deputies has become something of an anachronism. It is an institution we inherited from the past and that is foreign to our mentality and to our fascist passions."

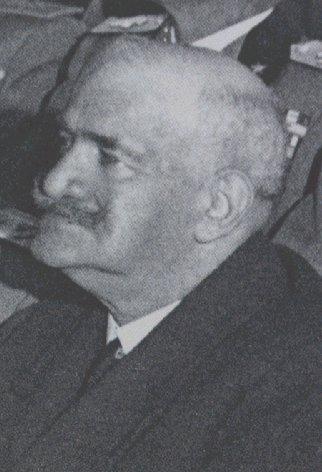
Costanzo Ciano served as president of the Chamber of Deputies from 1934 to 1939.

On December 14, 1938, the Chamber of Deputies enacted a further constitutional reform abolishing itself in favor of a new body, the Chamber of Fasces and Corporations. "In a typically enthusiastic manner, the deputies emphasized their self-denying fervor by acclaiming also a bill drafting them for front-line service in time of war [regardless of age or physical condition]", wrote one observer. It was given royal assent and the new chamber convened the following spring.

=== Election ===
The post-1928 Chamber of Deputies was composed of 400 members. Syndicates composed of employers confederations, employees confederations (a form of trade union), and associations of citizens involved in the "liberal professions and arts" (generally including those employed as educators, artists, artisans, lawyers, accountants, and similar), were responsible for nominating a total of 800 candidates. To this list were added a further 200 candidates nominated by "public bodies" which included the Italian Olympic Committee, the Dante Alighieri Society, the Touring Club Italiano, the Royal Academy of Italy, veterans' groups, and others. From the resulting list of 1,000 candidates, the Grand Council of Fascism would select 400 who would, thereafter, be formally appointed by the King of Italy.

The 400 candidates appointed by the King to the chamber would, before convening, be subject to a popular confidence test through a national referendum; a majority of votes against the new chamber would prompt its dissolution and a competitive public election for the body by geographic constituencies would be held. However, during the period of its existence under the 1928 statute, neither of the two proposed chambers were rejected in the referendums held for their approval (in 1929 and 1934).

The term of the chamber was five years. Qualifications for voters were Italian citizenship and attainment of the age of 18 years (lowering the voting age to 18 was one of the original political demands of the Fasci di Combattimento).

=== Profile ===
As of 1934, a plurality of deputies were lawyers by profession (99 of the 400 members of the chamber), with engineers, journalists, and university professors representing the second, third, and fourth largest vocational backgrounds among deputies, respectively.

== Senate ==
The role and composition of the Senate was essentially unchanged after the Fascist revolution. Senators were appointed for life by the King on the recommendation of the Prime Minister, though a small number of persons (adult princes of the royal family, for instance), were automatically members of the Senate. The Senate had no limit on its size and, as of 1935, it had 455 members.

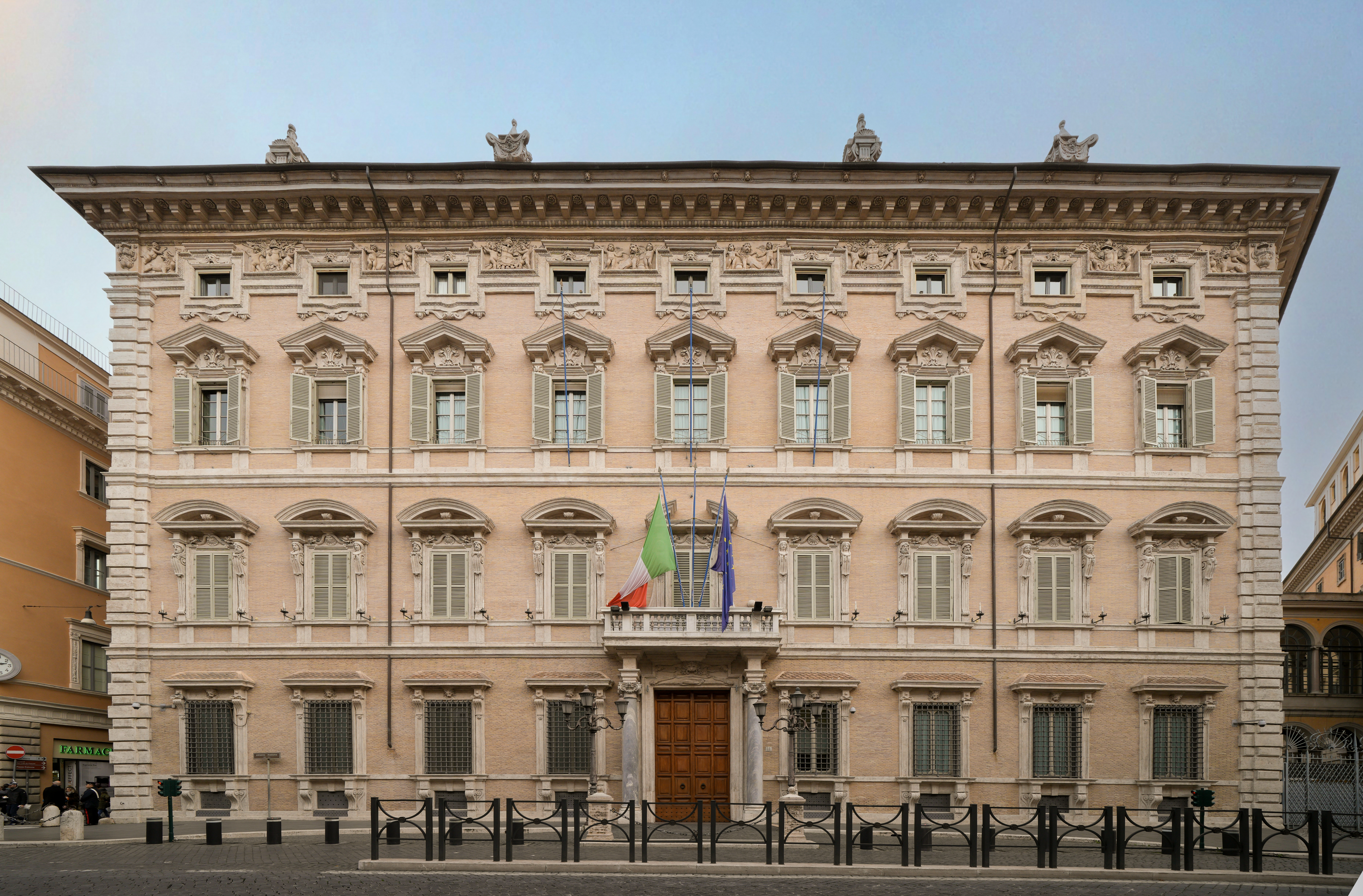
The Senate sat in the Palazzo Madama, pictured here in 2022.

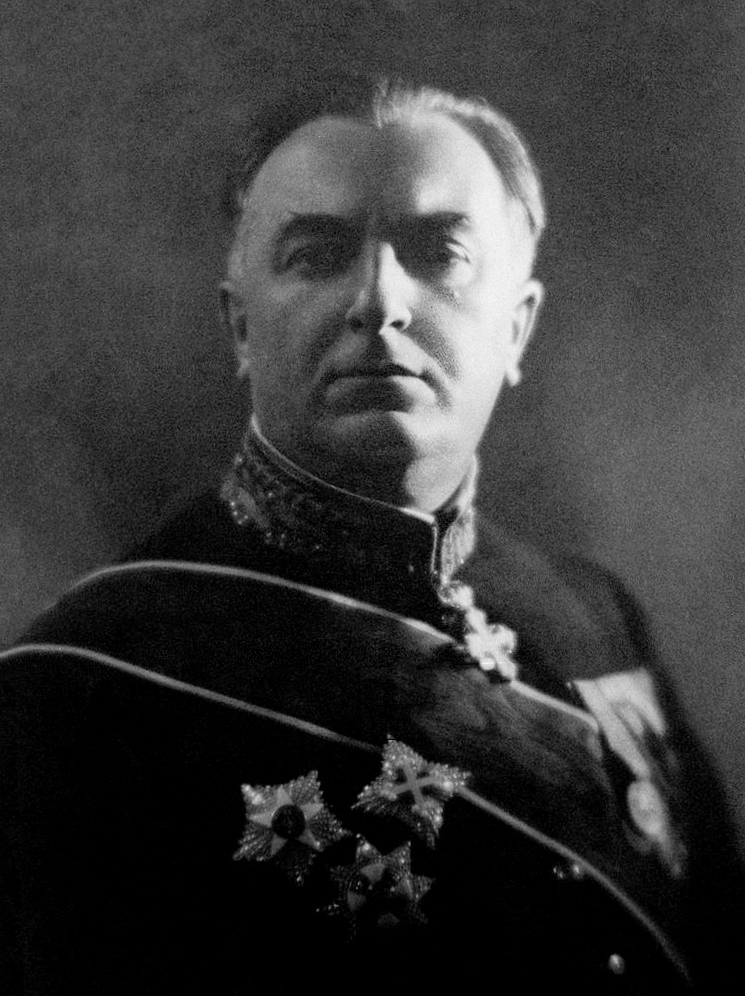
Luigi Federzoni served as president of the Senate from 1929 to 1939.

By custom, however, the Senate had rarely exercised its powers and it functioned primarily as an honorary body to which elder statesmen, retired senior civil servants and diplomats, military leaders, and other prominent persons would be appointed. Nonetheless, the Senate endured throughout the Fascist period as its "abolition would have meant an unacceptable encroachment on the King's prerogative".

After Mussolini's appointment as prime minister of Italy, most new nominees to the Senate were members of the National Fascist Party (PNF). By the early 1930s, a majority of senators were PNF members, though several dozen non-Fascist and anti-Fascist senators continued to hold office.

== Lawmaking ==
Under the Italian constitution, parliament was composed of the King and both houses, with any of the three authorized to initiate legislation which was then enacted upon approval of the other two. However, in addition, the King was able to, on the advice of the Prime Minister, issue decrees which had force of law unless repealed by parliament. Though this prerogative had typically been reserved for emergencies, after the Fascist revolution it became the customary method by which new legislation was passed.

== See also ==
- Italian parliament
- Parliament of the Kingdom of Italy
- Reichstag (Nazi Germany)
