= Pietro De Francisci =

Italian Fascist politician (1883–1971)

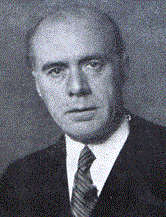

Minister of Justice of the Kingdom of Italy
- In office 20 July 1932 – 24 January 1935
- Preceded by: Alfredo Rocco
- Succeeded by: Arrigo Solmi

Member of the Chamber of Deputies of the Kingdom of Italy
- In office 20 April 1929 – 2 March 1939

Member of the Chamber of Fasces and Corporations
- In office 23 March 1939 – 5 August 1943

Personal details
- Born: 18 December 1883 Rome, Kingdom of Italy
- Died: 31 January 1971 (aged 87) Formia, Italy
- Party: National Fascist Party

Baron Pietro De Francisci (18 December 1883 – 31 January 1971) was an Italian jurist and Fascist politician who served as Minister of Justice from 1932 to 1935.

== Biography ==
The son of a ministerial inspector, he was born in Rome but in 1887 he moved to Milan with his family. In the early 1900s he worked as secretary of an anti-divorce committee, which allowed him to gain ties to vast circles of the Catholic world, including Roman law scholars Contardo Ferrini and Pietro Bonfante, with whom he graduated in law in 1905 and whose ideas he embraced. De Francisci participated in the formation of the Papyrological School of Milan (1913-1914) and directed its juridical part, chairing the panel for the publication of its studies and editing the legal part of the magazine Aegyptus. He became a free lecturer in history of Roman law in 1912, and full professor on 1 July 1924; in December of the same year he was transferred to the University of Rome.

After the end of the First World War (in which he participated from 1916, first as an infantry officer and later in the intelligence service), in November 1918, he was placed at the disposal of the Supreme War Council in Versailles to carry out preparatory studies for the talks of the peace conference, and later became head of the press office of the Italian delegation at the Versailles Conference. In 1924 he published his most successful work relating to private law, Il trasferimento della proprietà. Storia e critica della dottrina, and on the following year he became dean of the Faculty of Law at the University of Rome. With the 1927 essay La missione del giurista he criticized the German legal approach which claimed to identify law with the will of the state, while extolling the Fascist state as the guarantor of the moral, political and economic unity of the nation. In 1930 he became rector of the La Sapienza University.

Having joined the National Fascist Party in 1923, he was commissioner of the Fascist federation of Carnaro between January and March 1924, and then briefly held the same role in Padua. In 1929 he was elected to the Italian Chamber of Deputies, and from 20 July 1932 to 24 January 1935 he served as Minister of Justice of the Mussolini Cabinet, succeeding Alfredo Rocco and being in turn replaced by Arrigo Solmi. He then returned to teaching, and with the essay Idee per un rinnovamento della scienza del diritto (1939) he affirmed that law is an expression of the "will to be" of the group and is concretized in the establishment of an order that tends to be implemented through power, which results in tension between the will of the group and that of the individual. Having won the Mussolini Prize (awarded by the Royal Academy of Italy) for moral and historical sciences in 1931, in 1936 he became a member of the Accademia dei Lincei and in 1938 of the Accademia d'Italia. In 1937 he took over from Giovanni Gentile in the presidency of the Fascist Institute of Culture.

In 1937 he became a member of the National Directorate of the Fascist Party, and in 1939 a member of the Chamber of Fasces and Corporations; Mussolini wished to appoint him President of the Chamber, but Galeazzo Ciano opposed this decision, as he wanted his father Costanzo's replacement to be a figure of "the highest level". In the end Dino Grandi became president, and De Francisci vice president. In April 1940 Mussolini, now close to entering the Second World War alongside the Third Reich, dismissed him from all the posts he held as at this point he preferred more "warlike" men to be at the helm of the administrations; he however left De Francisci as vice president of the Chamber of Fasces and Corporations, at his request.

After the fall of Fascism, his role in the regime made him disliked by the new political class, and in July 1944 he was dismissed from his post as a university teacher by the AMGOT. However, he continued to devote himself to the study and writing of legal essays until on 17 January 1949 he was reinstated in his role as a teacher by the Council of State, resuming teaching at the Sapienza University until 1954. He occasionally wrote for Il Tempo, directed numerous cultural institutions and kept writing a number of books and essays during the 1950s and 1960s. He died in 1971.
