= Alfredo De Marsico =

Italian politician (1888–1895)

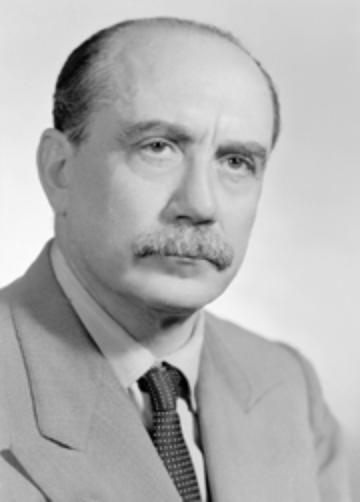

Minister of Justice of the Kingdom of Italy
- In office 6 February 1943 – 25 July 1943
- Preceded by: Dino Grandi
- Succeeded by: Gaetano Azzariti

Member of the Chamber of Fasces and Corporations
- In office 23 March 1939 – 5 August 1943

Member of the Chamber of Deputies of the Kingdom of Italy
- In office 24 May 1924 – 2 March 1939

Member of the Senate of the Italian Republic
- In office 25 June 1953 – 11 June 1958

Personal details
- Born: 29 May 1888 Sala Consilina, Kingdom of Italy
- Died: 8 August 1985 (aged 97) Naples, Italy
- Party: National Fascist Party; National Monarchist Party; People's Monarchist Party
- Awards: Order of Saints Maurice and Lazarus; Civil Order of Savoy

Alfredo De Marsico (29 May 1888 – 8 August 1985) was an Italian Fascist politician who served as the last Minister of Justice of the Mussolini Cabinet from February to July 1943. After the war, he continued his political career in the National Monarchist Party and later in the People's Monarchist Party.

== Biography ==
De Marsico was born in 1888 in the province of Salerno and graduated in law in 1909 at the University of Naples, beginning his career as a lawyer on 5 December of the same year. He became a prosecutor from 1911 to 1917, when he enrolled in the Bar. In May 1915 he became assistant professor in Law and Criminal Procedure, then full professor at the universities of Camerino (1922), Cagliari (1926), Bari (1926), Bologna (1931), Naples (1935), and finally at the Sapienza University of Rome from 1938 to 1960.

Having joined the National Fascist Party, De Marsico was elected to the Italian Chamber of Deputies in 1924, and then again in 1929 and in 1934; during this period he passed a law on the reform of the penal code and collaborated in the drafting of the Rocco Code. In 1939 he became a member of the Chamber of Fasces and Corporations. From 1925 to 1942 he was a member of the parliamentary commission for the reform of codes, and on 6 February 1943 Mussolini appointed him as Minister of Justice, in place of Dino Grandi. A member of the Grand Council of Fascism, on 25 July 1943 he voted in favor of the Grandi motion which led to the dismissal of Mussolini and the fall of the regime. He was therefore sentenced to death in absentia by the Italian Social Republic in the Verona trial of 1944 but meanwhile had taken refuge in Salerno, in Allied-controlled southern Italy.

After the end of the wa and due to his role in the regime, De Marsico he was banned from teaching for seven years and from exercising his profession as a lawyer for four years. In 1953 he was elected as an independent senator with the National Monarchist Party, and in November 1954 he passed to Achille Lauro's People's Monarchist Party, where he remained until 1958. In 1964 he was appointed professor emeritus of the La Sapienza University of Rome. He was also eight times president of the Naples Bar until 1980, as well as a member of the code reform commission and rapporteur for the Criminal Code project. He died in Naples in 1985 at the age of 97.
