= Carlo Alberto Biggini =

Italian politician (1902–1945)

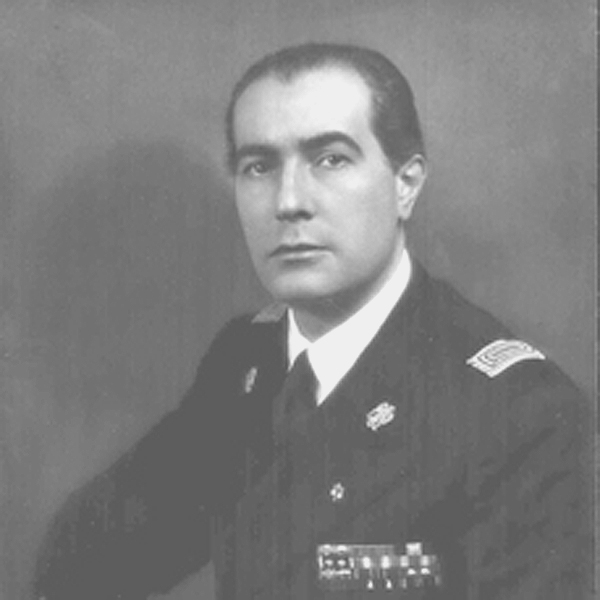

Minister of National Education of the Kingdom of Italy
- In office February 6 – July 25, 1943
- Prime Minister: Benito Mussolini
- Preceded by: Giuseppe Bottai
- Succeeded by: Leonardo Severi

Minister of National Education of the Italian Social Republic
- In office September 23, 1943 – April 25, 1945
- Preceded by: title created
- Succeeded by: title abolished

Member of the Chamber of Deputies
- In office April 28, 1934 – March 2, 1939

Member of the Chamber of Fasces and Corporations
- In office March 23, 1939 – August 5, 1943

Personal details
- Born: December 9, 1902 Sarzana, Kingdom of Italy
- Died: November 19, 1945 (aged 42) Padova, Italy
- Party: National Fascist Party (1928-1943); Republican Fascist Party (1943-1945)
- Education: University of Turin

Carlo Alberto Biggini (December 9, 1902 – November 19, 1945) was an Italian fascist politician who served as minister of education before and after proclamation of the Italian Social Republic under Benito Mussolini.

== Biography ==
Born in Sarzana, Province of La Spezia, he joined the Blackshirts in 1920, and co-signed the Fascist Intellectuals' Manifesto in 1925. He earned a bachelor's degree in law and political science in 1928, and subsequently taught law at the University of Sassari, and then at the University of Pisa (where he became the rector in 1941). Biggini asserted himself through his strong belief in corporatism.

Despite a brief collaboration with Anti-fascists, he joined the National Fascist Party (PNF) in 1928, and became party secretary for the Fascio in La Spezia, being elected to the Chamber of Deputies in 1934. He fought in the Second Italo-Abyssinian War (as a lieutenant in the 84th Fanteria of the Division Gavinana in Italian East Africa), and rose to become inspector for the PNF, then (February 5, 1943) Minister of National Education and a Grand Council of Fascism member.

On July 25, Biggini voted against Dino Grandi's proposal for the removal of Mussolini, and stood by the Duce as the Social Republic was created with help from Nazi Germany. The Germans were also instrumental in pressuring him to accept the Ministry again. Placing his seat in Padua, Biggini managed to avoid capture by the partisans in Dongo.

Protected by many fascists, he managed to avoid arrest, but fell ill and died under an assumed name in a Milan clinic.
