= Aldo Oviglio =

Italian politician (1873–1942)

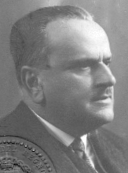

Minister of Justice
- In office 31 October 1922 – 5 January 1925
- Prime Minister: Benito Mussolini
- Preceded by: Giulio Alessio
- Succeeded by: Alfredo Rocco

Personal details
- Born: 7 December 1873 Rimini, Emilia-Romagna, Kingdom of Italy
- Died: 19 August 1942 (aged 68) Ronerio, Emilia-Romagna, Fascist Italy
- Party: Radical Party; National Fascist Party
- Spouse: Ida Marzolini
- Children: 1
- Education: University of Bologna

Aldo Oviglio (Rimini, 7 December 1873 – Ronerio, 19 August 1942) was an Italian lawyer and fascism politician who served, among other, as Mussolini's first minister of justice between 1922 and 1925. Born and raised in Emilia-Romagna, Oviglio initially joined the Italian Radical Party, serving several terms in Bologna's municipal and provincial councils, before joining the National Fascist Party in 1920. He was then elected to the Chamber of Deputies in 1921, became minister of justice (1922–1925), and finally senator (1929–1942).

== Early life and education ==
Oviglio was born in Rimini on 7 December 1873 to parents Francesco and Ida Malvolti. During his secondary education, his family moved to Pesaro, and then to Rovigo. At this time, he began contributing columns in the democratic newspaper L'Adigetto, expressing opposition to Corriere del Polesine, a local newspaper edited by Alberto Bergamini whom Bergamini duelled on 7 December 1894.

Oviglio attended the University of Padua. In 1892, he enrolled at the University of Bologna from which he graduated with a law degree.

== Political career ==
=== Bolognese councillor ===
Oviglio served as a councillor of Bologna's provincial council between 8 August 1910 and 14 December 1913. During this time, he cofounded Giornale del Mattino, a short-lived left-wing Bolognese newspaper first issued on 11 December 1910. He contested the 1913 general election for the Vergato constituency, but was not elected.

Giornale del Mattino's contributors supported Italy's participation in the First World War, criticising the antimilitarism of the Italian Socialist Party. Oviglio, whose son died during the war, began to approach nationalist politicians. In October 1920, he joined an electoral committee dedicated to liberal conservatism, and was elected to Bologna's municipal and provincial councils at the end of end of that month.

On 21 November 1920, a fascist attack on the Palazzo d'Accursio, the seat of Bologna's municipal government, killed ten socialists and a liberal-conservative councillor. On the same day, Oviglio joined the National Fascist Party.

=== Minister of Justice ===
Oviglio was elected to the Chamber of Deputies in the 1921 general election for the National Bloc with 23,981 votes, ranking first in the party's Bologna list, ahead of Benito Mussolini, Leandro Arpinati and Dino Grandi. Oviglio served in the 26th and 27th legislatures.

On 31 October 1922, Oviglio was appointed to Mussolini's first cabinet as minister of Justice. His reforms included instituting a single supreme court, reforming legal codes, and slimming down Italy's judicial bureaucracy. In December 1922, he freed incarcerated squadristi, and on 3 May 1923, a legislative decree dismissed the chief judge and general attorney of the supreme court.

On 18 February 1923, he signed Law No. 396, a major drug prohibition law today remembered as "Mussolini-Oviglio law" that also listed as a drug for the first time Cannabis, a plant used during centuries in Italy.

In March 1923, Oviglio was made an Honorary Corporal of the Milita. Oviglio was a member of the Grand Council of Fascism from April 1923 to December 1924, and again President of Bologna's provincial council from March 1923 to October 1928.

=== Later political life ===
Oviglio's term as minister of justice ended on 5 January 1925 when he resigned from the office due to the assassination of Giacomo Matteotti. Oviglio was expelled from the National Fascist Party in August 1925, after speaking against a government proposal that would have undermined judicial independence. He was readmitted the party in August 1928, and was appointed a senator on 24 January 1929.

== Personal life and death ==
Oviglio was married to Ida Marzolini. Their son, Galeazzo, was a sublieutenant in the 3rd Field Artillery Regiment during World War I, and died after sustaining injuries in the Battle of Montello.

In September 1909, Oviglio joined a masonic lodge in Bologna, and was elevated to the third degree within a month. Italy's masonic lodges were dissolved after a legislative decree in November 1925.

Oviglio died in Ronerio, near Bologna, on 19 August 1942. He was buried with his son in the cemetery of Certosa.

=== Awards ===
Oviglio was the recipient of the following:

- Grand Officer of the Order of the Crown of Italy (17 December 1922)
- Grand Cordon of the Order of the Crown of Italy (30 December 1923)
- Grand Officer of the Order of Saints Maurizio and Lazzaro (7 June 1923)
