= Giuseppe Tassinari =

Italian politician

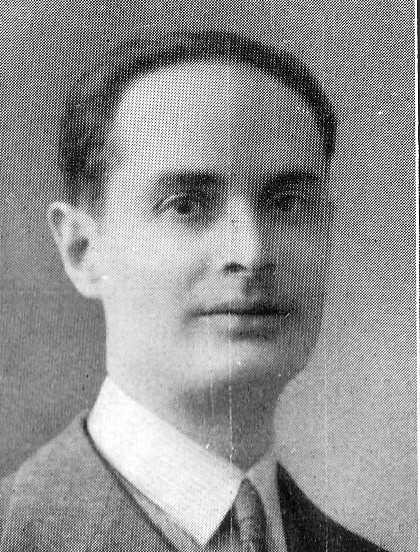

Minister of Agriculture of the Kingdom of Italy
- In office 21 October 1939 – 26 December 1941
- Preceded by: Edmondo Rossoni
- Succeeded by: Carlo Pareschi
- State Undersecretary for Agriculture of the Kingdom of Italy
- In office 24 January 1935 – 31 October 1939

Member of the Chamber of Deputies of the Kingdom of Italy
- In office 20 April 1929 – 2 March 1939

Personal details
- Born: 16 December 1891 Perugia, Kingdom of Italy
- Died: 21 December 1944 (aged 53) Salò, Italian Social Republic
- Party: National Fascist Party; Republican Fascist Party

Military service
- Allegiance: Kingdom of Italy
- Branch/service: Royal Italian Army
- Battles/wars: World War I

Giuseppe Tassinari (16 December 1891 – 21 December 1944) was an Italian Fascist politician, member of the Chamber of Deputies and of the Grand Council of Fascism and minister of agriculture of the Kingdom of Italy from 1939 to 1941.

== Biography ==
A renowned agronomist, Tassinari obtained two degrees in the field, in 1912 and in 1919, interrupting his studies to fight in the First World War. In the 1920s he was a university professor of forestry economics at the National Forestry Institute of Florence and of agricultural economics and policy at the University of Bologna, where he became dean. Having joined the National Fascist Party (PNF), he was twice elected to the Italian Chamber of Deputies in 1929 and 1934. In 1933 he became director of the Royal Agricultural Institute of Bologna, and on the following year, with the transformation of the Institute into a university, he assumed the post of principal, which he would hold until his death.

In the Mussolini Cabinet Tassinari was undersecretary of the ministry of agriculture and forestry from 1935 to 1939 and then minister from 1939 until 1941 when he was replaced by Carlo Pareschi. He subsequently devoted himself to the drafting of the Agronomist's Manual (1941) and on the following year he obtained an honorary degree from the University of Berlin; he also wrote articles for the Corriere della Sera. After the armistice of Cassibile he joined the Italian Social Republic, where however he did not hold any important post, since the task of managing the department of agriculture was entrusted to Edoardo Moroni. Heinrich Himmler and especially Eugen Dollmann had in fact considered Tassinari as the right man to lead the government of the RSI, but his hesitations in going to Germany and the bad impression he aroused on Hitler in their meeting on 13 September, followed by Mussolini's liberation in the Gran Sasso raid, nullified these plans. Tassinari later moved to Desenzano del Garda, but died in Salò shortly before Christmas 1944 due to an Allied air raid.
