= Dino Alfieri =

Italian politician and diplomat

Edoardo (Dino) Alfieri
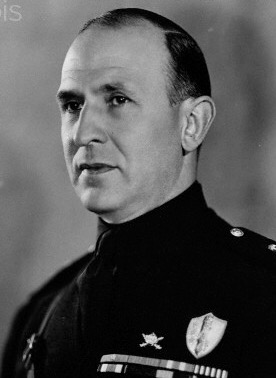

Minister of Popular Culture
- In office 11 June 1936 – 31 October 1939
- Preceded by: Galeazzo Ciano
- Succeeded by: Alessandro Pavolini

Personal details
- Born: 8 June 1886 Bologna, Italy
- Died: 2 January 1966 (aged 79) Milan, Italy
- Party: PNF
- Spouse: Carlotta Bonomi (m. 1920)
- Profession: Lawyer, diplomat

Edoardo (Dino) Alfieri (8 June 1886 – 2 January 1966) was an Italian fascist politician and diplomat. He served as Benito Mussolini's press and propaganda minister and ambassador to Berlin.

== Early life and education ==
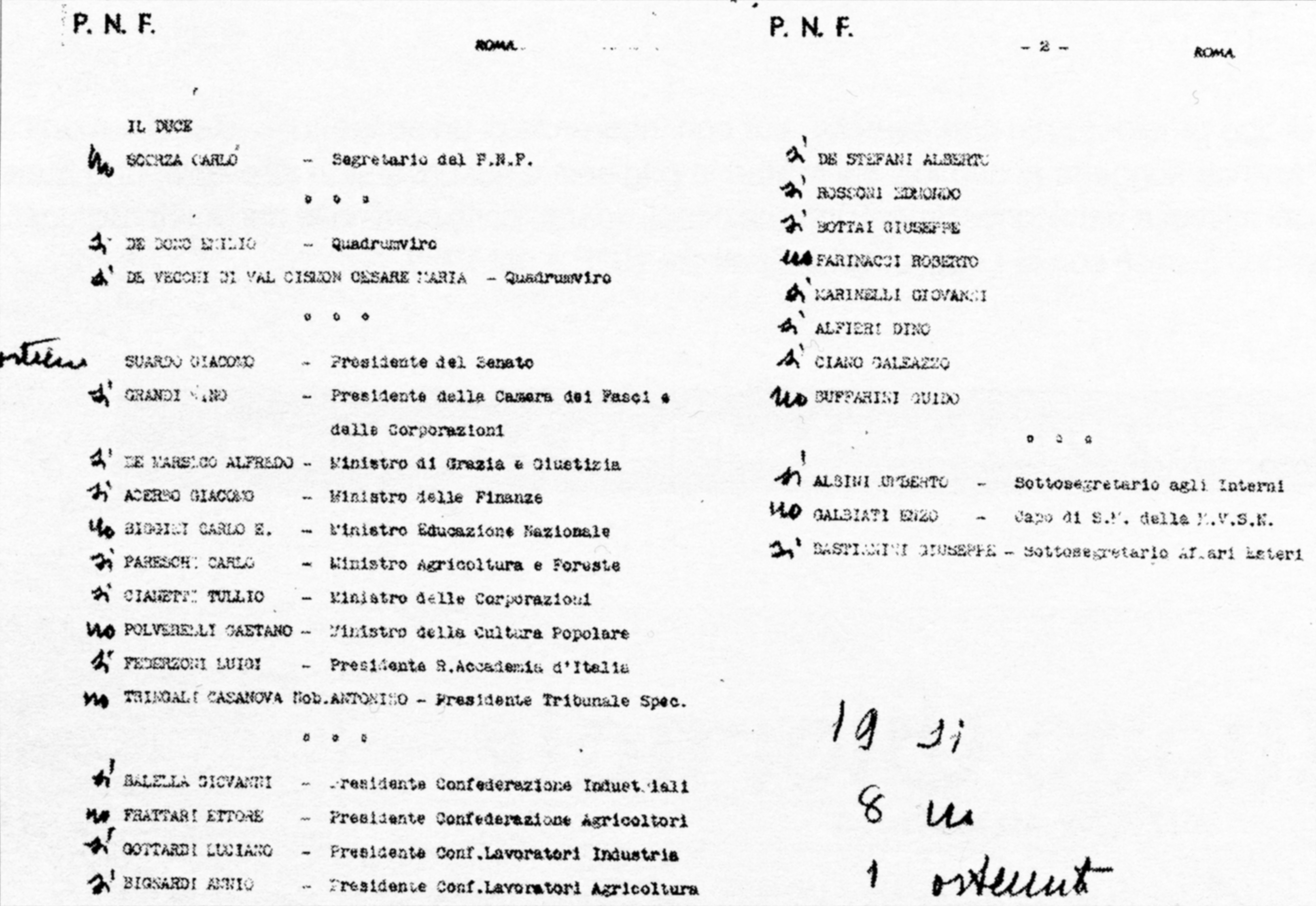
Dino Alfieri supported the Ordine del Giorno Grandi that led to the fall from power of the Fascist government

Alfieri was born in Bologna in 1886 to Antonio and Maria Bedogni. Growing up, he was politically active, joining the Nationalist Association in 1910.

He completed his law degree at the University of Genoa in 1915 and shortly thereafter volunteer for military service. Alfieri was quickly promoted to lieutenant earning a bronze medal in 1916 and silver medal for military valor in 1917. He was discharged in July 1919.

In 1911, he finished law studies and soon after joined the nationalist group formed by Enrico Corradini. A volunteer in World War I, he was critical of the merger between Corradini's group and Benito Mussolini's National Fascist Party (PNF). Nonetheless, he was elected to the Italian Chamber of Deputies on the PNF list in 1924.

== Political career ==
Under Mussolini's government, Alfieri was assigned several tasks: between 1929 and 1934, he was co-director of the Exhibition of the Fascist Revolution, deputy secretary of the Corporazioni, and deputy secretary for Press and Propaganda from 1935, assuming the duties of Minister Galeazzo Ciano during the latter's mission in the Second Italo-Abyssinian War. When Ciano moved on to become Minister of Foreign Affairs, Dino Alfieri found himself appointed Minister of People's Culture in 1937, and declared himself in favour of Antisemitical racial segregation laws passed in 1938.

He was Italy's envoy to the Holy See starting 7 November 1939, and five months later to Nazi Germany, where he often met Adolf Hitler. While there, he was constantly helping out Italian workers and consulate staff. As the war progressed and Italy needed help, he attempted to solicit material aid from Germany, but despite assurances, little came of it. When the war began to deteriorate for the Axis, he wrote communiques and expressed verbally to Mussolini that the Germans saw Italy simply as a buffer state from the encroaching allies and urged the Duce to seek peace with the Allies but simultaneously assured the Germans that Italy was not betraying them.

In July 1943, Alfieri was called to Rome by members of the Grand Council in order to participate in a meeting. It is unclear as to whether he truly realized what was being proposed at the meeting. A member of the Grand Council of Fascism, Alfieri voted in favor of Dino Grandi's coup d'état in July 1943, that led to Mussolini's arrest and fall from power of the Italian Fascist government.

When the German Wehrmacht occupied Italy (see Operation Achse), Alfieri fled to Switzerland.

In January 1944, he was sentenced to death in absentia by a kangaroo court during the Verona trial. The Swiss government did not give him political asylum but tolerated his attendance in Switzerland.

On 12 November 1946, an Italian court stated his innocence. On 6 February 1947, an inquiry of the Italian Foreign Ministry ended. Then, he was officially pensioned off.

== Postwar ==
In 1947, Alfieri returned to Italy and a year later published his memoirs as Due dittatori di fronte ("[Two] Dictators Face to Face"). The book reveals little about Italian and German relations during the war beyond personal recollections.

== Death ==
Alfieri died in a Milan hospital on 2 January 1966. Details about his death were withheld for three days. At the time of his death, Alfieri was president of Mitam, a textile and clothing manufacturers association.

== Bibliography ==
- Christian Zentner, Friedemann Bedürftig (1991). The Encyclopedia of the Third Reich. Macmillan, New York. ISBN 0-02-897502-2
- Dino Alfieri, (1967) Dos Dictadores Frente a Frente. Barcelona: Plaza & Janes.
