= Luigi Federzoni =

Italian politician

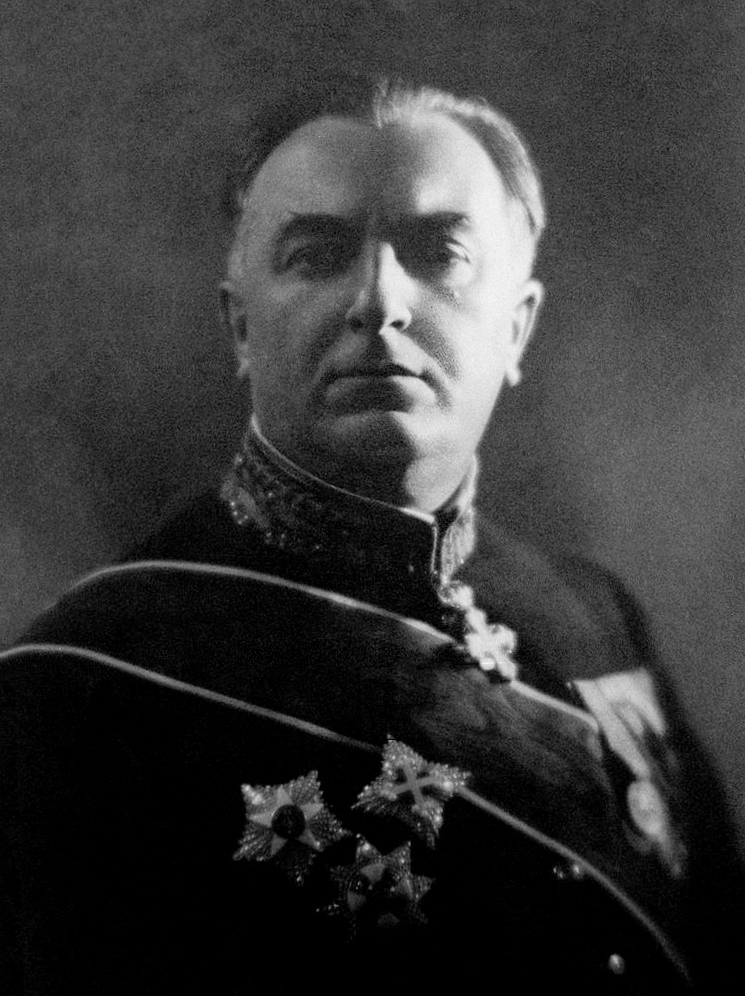

President of the Senate
- In office 29 April 1929 – 2 March 1939
- Preceded by: Tommaso Tittoni
- Succeeded by: Giacomo Suardo

Minister of the Colonies
- In office 6 November 1926 – 18 December 1928
- Prime Minister: Benito Mussolini
- Preceded by: Pietro Lanza di Scalea
- Succeeded by: Benito Mussolini
- In office 31 October 1922 – 17 June 1924
- Prime Minister: Benito Mussolini
- Preceded by: Giovanni Amendola
- Succeeded by: Pietro Lanza di Scalea

Minister of the Interior
- In office 17 June 1924 – 6 November 1926
- Prime Minister: Benito Mussolini
- Preceded by: Benito Mussolini
- Succeeded by: Benito Mussolini

Member of the Senate of the Kingdom
- In office 22 November 1928 – 5 August 1943
- Appointed by: Victor Emmanuel III

Member of the Chamber of Deputies
- In office 27 November 1913 – 22 November 1928
- Constituency: Rome

Personal details
- Born: 27 September 1878 Bologna, Italy
- Died: 24 January 1967 (aged 88) Rome, Italy
- Party: Italian Fascist Party
- Height: 1.75 m (5 ft 9 in)
- Profession: Politician, president of the Royal Academy of Italy

Luigi Federzoni (27 September 1878 – 24 January 1967) was an Italian nationalist and later Fascist politician.

== Biography ==
Federzoni was born in Bologna. Educated at the university there, he took to journalism and literature, and for several years was on the staff of the newspaper Giornale d'Italia in Rome. He was also among the editors of the weekly newspaper L'Idea Nazionale.

Among the founders of the Nationalist movement, which later on identified itself with fascism, he was elected a deputy for one of Rome's divisions, at the elections of 1913. In the chamber he never missed an opportunity to combat the Socialists, Republicans and Democrats.

He endorsed Italy joining World War I on the side of France and the United Kingdom against Austria-Hungary and Germany. As soon as Italy intervened in the war, he joined the army as a lieutenant of artillery and was awarded a medal for valour.

Federzoni supported Benito Mussolini when the latter issued his manifesto of 26 October 1922, announcing the march on Rome. In the cabinet formed by Mussolini five days later, Federzoni was minister for the colonies. After the Matteotti murder in June 1924, he was succeeded by Pietro Lanza di Scalea in post, and Mussolini selected Federzoni for the post of minister of the interior from 1924 to 1926 and he was president of the senate from 1929 to 1939. He was also president of the Royal Academy of Italy (founded by Mussolini).

At the historic meeting of the Grand Council of Fascism held on 25 July 1943 when the Fascist regime ended, he was among those who voted for Dino Grandi's Ordine del giorno which led to Mussolini's downfall, for which he was condemned in absentia at the Verona trial. In 1945, Federzoni was sentenced to life in prison for collaborationism, but he was amnestied in 1947. He died in Rome on 24 January 1967.

== Works ==
- Il corruttore, Bologna, Zanichelli, 1900.
- Candidati all'immortalità. (Prima serie), come Giulio De Frenzi, Bologna, Zanichelli, 1904.
- Il sandalo d'Apelle. Note su l'arte contemporanea, come Giulio De Frenzi, Bologna, Libr. Treves di L. Beltrami Edit., 1904.
- L'allegra verità, come Giulio De Frenzi, Milano, De Mohr, Antongini e C., 1905.
- Il lucignolo dell'ideale, come Giulio De Frenzi, Napoli, Ricciardi, 1909.
- Per l'italianità del "Gardasee", come Giulio De Frenzi, Napoli, Ricciardi, 1909.
- Di alcuni libri del 1909. Note bibliografiche, come Giulio De Frenzi, con Alberto Lumbroso, Roma, Libreria editrice della Rivista di Roma, 1910.
- Un eroe: Alfredo Oriani, come Giulio De Frenzi, Roma, Libreria della Rivista di Roma, 1910.
- Ignacio Zuloaga, come Giulio De Frenzi, Roma, Garzoni-Provenzani, 1912.
- L'Italia nell'Egeo, come Giulio De Frenzi, Roma, Garzoni-Provenzani, 1913.
- L'italiano errante. Giacomo Casanova di Seingalt, come Giulio De Frenzi, Napoli, Ricciardi, 1913.
- La Dalmazia che aspetta, Bologna, Zanichelli, 1915.
- Popolari e nazionalisti, Bologna, La tip. nazionale, 1921.
- Il Trattato di Rapallo. Con un'appendice di documenti, Bologna, Zanichelli, 1921.
- Presagi alla nazione. Discorsi politici, Milano, Casa editrice Imperia del Partito nazionale fascista, 1924; Milano, Mondadori, 1925.
- Paradossi di ieri, Milano, Mondadori, 1926.
- Venti mesi di azione coloniale, Milano, Mondadori, 1926.
- Rinascita dell'Africa romana, Bologna, Zanichelli, 1929.
- Il ritorno di Giosuè Carducci, Bologna, Zanichelli, 1932.
- I problemi attuali dell'agricoltura italiana, studi raccolti e coordinati da, Bologna, Zanichelli, 1933.
- A. O.. Il "Posto al sole", Bologna, Zanichelli, 1936.
- Parole fasciste al Sud America, Bologna, Zanichelli, 1938.
- L'ora della Dalmazia, Bologna, Zanichelli, 1941.
- Esercito e impero. [9 maggio 1941], in Pagine sulla guerra alla radio, Firenze, Sansoni, 1941.
- Bologna carducciana, Bologna, Cappelli, 1961.
- Italia di ieri per la storia di domani, Milano, Mondadori, 1967.
- 1927: diario di un ministro del fascismo, Firenze, Passigli, 1993. ISBN 88-368-0261-3.

== Quotes ==
"Italy has awaited this since 1866 her truly national war, in order to feel unified at last, renewed by the unanimous action and identical sacrifice of all her sons. Today, while Italy still wavers before the necessity imposed by history, the name of Garibaldi, resanctified by blood, rises again to warn her that she will not be able to defeat the revolution save by fighting and winning her national war." Federzoni, 1915, at memorial services being held for a relative of Italian national hero Giuseppe Garibaldi, called the "Hero of Two Worlds" because of his military enterprises in Brazil, Uruguay and Europe

Political offices
Preceded by Giovanni Amendola	Italian Minister of the Colonies; 1922–1924	Succeeded by Pietro Lanza di Scalea
Preceded by Benito Mussolini	Italian Minister of the Interior; 1924–1926	Succeeded by Benito Mussolini
Preceded by Pietro Lanza di Scalea	Italian Minister of the Colonies; 1926–1928	Succeeded by Benito Mussolini interim
Preceded by Tommaso Tittoni	President of the Italian Senate; 1929–1939	Succeeded by Giacomo Suardo
