= Acerbo Law =

Italian law that gave Mussolini a majority in the Chamber of Deputies

Parliament of the Kingdom of Italy
- Long title: Amendments to the political electoral law, consolidated text 2 September 1919, n. 1495
- Territorial extent: Kingdom of Italy
- Enacted by: Chamber of Deputies
- Enacted by: Senate
- Assented to by: King Victor Emmanuel III
- Assented to: 18 November 1923

Legislative history

Initiating chamber: Chamber of Deputies
- Introduced by: Giacomo Acerbo (PNF)
- Passed: 21 July 1923

Revising chamber: Senate
- Passed: 14 November 1923

Amends
- Royal Decree 2 September 1919, n. 1495

Repealed by
- Law 17 May 1928, n.1019
- Status: Repealed

The Acerbo Law was an Italian electoral law proposed by Baron Giacomo Acerbo and passed by the Italian Parliament in November 1923. The purpose of it was to give Mussolini's fascist party a majority of deputies. The law was used only in the 1924 general election, which was the last competitive election held in Italy until 1946.

== Background ==
In 1922, Benito Mussolini became the prime minister of Italy as a result of the March on Rome. However, he still only had 35 deputies in Parliament and 10 Nationalist allies. He was in a weak position and relied on the coalition with other parties that could easily unravel and force King Victor Emmanuel III to dismiss him. The idea was to change the voting system from proportional representation to a system which would allow Mussolini to have a clear majority.

== Terms of the law ==
The Acerbo Law stated that the party gaining the largest share of the votes – provided they had gained at least 25 per cent of the votes – gained two-thirds of the seats in parliament. The remaining third was shared amongst the other parties proportionally.

== Reasoning ==
Mussolini could only count on the support of 35 Fascist deputies and 10 Nationalists. The law was passed on a majority vote. The obvious question is why a majority of deputies from other parties voted for the law knowing that one way or another Mussolini would gain the 25% required. The Socialists voted against it but made no effort to coordinate other parties to oppose it. The Catholic Italian People's Party was divided and leaderless after Mussolini engineered the dismissal of Luigi Sturzo. The official policy was to abstain, but 14 deputies voted for the measure. The smaller Liberal parties generally voted in favour. They lacked clear direction and many believed Mussolini's talk of strong government or hoped to keep their positions. There is no doubt that the presence of armed squadristi in the Chamber intimidated many into voting for the measure.

== The 1924 election ==
While an election was held straight afterwards under the new rules, the result has to be seriously questioned given the widespread violence against Mussolini's opposition, along with voter intimidation and electoral fraud. Consequently, his opponents were demoralised and in disarray, while many of the new Fascist deputies were ex-Liberal deputies who commanded a substantial personal following, especially in the South.

The widespread voter fraud was denounced by the leader of the Unitary Socialist Party Giacomo Matteotti in a speech to the Chamber of Deputies on 30 May 1924. Matteotti was subsequently kidnapped and murdered by Fascist militiamen led by Amerigo Dumini. The murder caused uproar and outrage in Italy and abroad, causing a constitutional crisis that would eventually lead to the establishment of the fascist dictatorship in Italy.

== Repeal ==
Following the transformation of Italy into a one-party state in 1926, the Acerbo Law became obsolete. In 1928, the Italian Parliament (now purged of any serious opposition) overwhelmingly passed a new electoral law, known as Rocco Law from its proponent Alfredo Rocco. The new law turned Italian elections into a plebiscite on a single list of candidates selected by the Grand Council of Fascism from members of the National Fascist Party and affiliated organizations.
