= Gaetano Polverelli =

Italian journalist and politician (1920–1969)

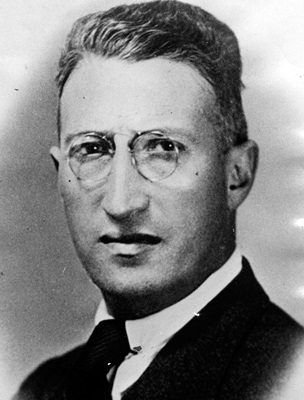

Minister of Popular Culture
- In office 6 February 1943 – 25 July 1943
- Prime Minister: Benito Mussolini
- Preceded by: Alessandro Pavolini
- Succeeded by: Office abolished

Member of the Chamber of Fasces and Corporations
- In office 23 March 1939 – 5 August 1943
- Appointed by: Benito Mussolini

Member of the Chamber of Deputies
- In office 24 May 1924 – 2 March 1939
- Constituency: Marche

Personal details
- Born: 17 November 1886 Visso, Kingdom of Italy
- Died: 17 September 1960 (aged 73) Anzio, Italy
- Party: National Fascist Party
- Children: 3

Gaetano Polverelli (17 November 1886 – 17 September 1960) was an Italian journalist and politician who served as the minister of popular culture in the cabinet of Benito Mussolini being the last Fascist to hold the post.

== Early life ==
Polverelli was born in Visso, Macerata, on 17 November 1886. He settled in Milan where he started his journalistic career and began to write for Il Popolo d'Italia from 1914.

== Career ==
After World War I Polverelli moved to Rome in 1919 and was one of the founders of the fascist organization there becoming its adviser in May 1919. The same year he was made the head of Il Popolo d'Italia's editorial office. He took part in the march on Rome in October 1922. He was elected to the Italian Parliament for the National Fascist Party in 1924.

Polverelli joined the supreme supervisory committee of the Italian Radio Auditions Authority (EIAR) in December 1927. He was re-elected as a deputy in March 1929. In December 1931 he was appointed head of the press office of the Mussolini government, replacing Lando Ferretti in the post. Polverelli was in office until August 1933 and was succeeded by Galeazzo Ciano as head of the press office.

On 12 January 1941 Polverelli was named as the undersecretary at the ministry of popular culture and continued to head the press office. He held the post until 6 February 1943 when he was appointed minister of popular culture to the cabinet led by Benito Mussolini replacing Alessandro Pavolini in the post. Polverelli was in the office until the end of the Fascist rule on 25 July 1943. During his term he employed a strict policy in regard to the translations of the literary works by the authors from Fascist Italy's "enemy" countries.

Following the fall of the Fascist rule Polverelli was arrested on 21 June 1944 and imprisoned until 19 July 1946, when he was acquitted by the Rome Court of Appeal.

== Personal life and death ==
Polverelli first married Aminta Fracchioni in Piacenza on 6 October 1910 and had a son from this marriage. He divorced his first wife and married Luisa Mazzetti in 1937 with whom he had two sons.

Polverelli remained away from public life until his death in Anzio on 17 September 1960.

=== Awards ===
Polverelli was the recipient of the grand cordon of the Order of St. Gregory the Great (June 1932); grand officer of the Order of the Nile (July 1933) and grand cordon of the Order of the Crown of Italy (November 1933).
