= Antonio Mosconi =

Italian businessman and politician (1866–1955)

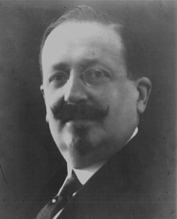

Minister of Finance
- In office July 1928 – July 1932
- Monarch: Victor Emmanuel III
- Prime Minister: Benito Mussolini
- Preceded by: Giuseppe Volpi
- Succeeded by: Guido Jung

Personal details
- Born: 9 September 1886 Vicenza, Kingdom of Italy
- Died: 12 July 1955 (aged 88)
- Education: University of Padua

Antonio Mosconi (9 September 1866 – 12 July 1955) was an Italian businessman and politician who held various political and government posts, including the finance minister between July 1928 and July 1932.

== Biography ==
Hailed from a family based in Vicenza Mosconi was born on 9 September 1886. He received a law degree from the University of Padua in 1908.

In 1911, he was named the secretary of the ministry of the interior. He was appointed municipal commissioner in Trieste in July 1919. When the military authority in Trieste was converted into a civil authority which was named as the provincial civilian government in July 1919, Mosconi headed it after Augusto Ciuffelli. Mosconi's term in this post began in December 1919.

From 1920, Mosconi was a member of the Italian Senate and the councillor of state. He was appointed minister of finance to the Mussolini's cabinet in July 1928 replacing Giuseppe Volpi in the post. In July 1932, Mosconi resigned from the office, and Guido Jung replaced him as finance minister. In the period 1932–1934, he headed the National Bank of Agriculture. The other posts of Mosconi included the head of the Central Tax Commission (1939–1944) and of the Olympic Academy of Vicenza (1936–1944). He died on 12 July 1955.
