= Paolo Ignazio Maria Thaon di Revel =

Italian fencer

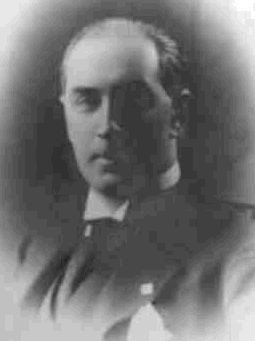

Minister of Finance and Treasure
- In office 24 January 1935 – 6 February 1943
- Prime Minister: Benito Mussolini
- Preceded by: Guido Jung
- Succeeded by: Giacomo Acerbo

Mayor of Torino
- In office 11 February 1929 – 24 January 1935
- Preceded by: Umberto Ricci
- Succeeded by: Ugo Sartirana

Member of the Senate of the Kingdom
- In office 9 December 1933 – 5 August 1945
- Appointed by: Victor Emmanuel III

Personal details
- Born: 2 May 1888 Toulon, France
- Died: 1 June 1973 (aged 85) Poirino, Italy
- Party: PNF
- Education: University of Turin
- Sports career
- Sport: Fencing
Medal record
Men's fencing
Representing Italy
Olympic Games
Gold medal – first place	1920 Antwerp	Épée, team

Paolo Ignazio Maria Thaon di Revel (2 May 1888 – 1 June 1973) was an Italian politician and fencer. He was the son of Count Vittorio Thaon di Revel and Elfrida Maria Atkinson. He fought in the First World War. He was also Mayor of Torino (1929–35) and Italian Minister of Finance (1935–43) in the Mussolini Cabinet. After the war, he was president of the organising committee of the 1956 Winter Olympics at Cortina d'Ampezzo.

He won a gold medal in the team épée event at the 1920 Summer Olympics.
