= Ferruccio Lantini =

Italian politician (1886–1958)

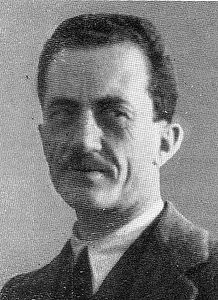

Minister of Corporations
- In office 11 June 1936 – 31 October 1939
- Prime Minister: Benito Mussolini
- Preceded by: Benito Mussolini
- Succeeded by: Renato Ricci

Personal details
- Born: 24 August 1886 Desio, Kingdom of Italy
- Died: 26 November 1958 (aged 72) Rome, Italy

Ferruccio Lantini (1886–1958) was one of the leading figures in the Fascist Italy. He was a member of the National Fascist Party and served as the minister of corporations between 1936 and 1939 in the cabinet of Benito Mussolini.

== Early life and education ==
Lantini was born in Desio on the 24 August 1886. He joined the socialists and after moving to Liguria he was admitted to Freemasonry at age 18. He received a degree in commercial sciences and involved in the nationalist movement.

== Career and activities ==
Settled in Genoa in 1912 Lantini became part of the early nationalist group and its secretary. He was enlisted in the army in 1916 and took part in World War I as an officer. He was promoted to the rank of lieutenant and was awarded the war cross. Returning to Genoa after his discharge from the army Lantini began to work in the provincial administration of the city's treasury for which he worked until 1923. From 1920 to 1923 he was also a municipal councilor.

In November 1921 Lantini participated in the congress of the National Fascist Party in Rome and was appointed representative for Liguria in the central committee of the party which he held until January 1923 when he was named as the political commissioner for Liguria. In 1922 he also became political secretary of the Genoa fasces and continued to lead the movement in Genoa.

In 1923 Lantini launched a newspaper entitled Giornale di Genova of which the first issue appeared on 1 August and directed the paper until January 1925. In April 1924 Lantini was elected to the Chamber of Deputies for the district of Liguria. In 1927 he was appointed president of the Fascist Confederation of Merchants which he held until 1934. During his tenure Lantini and Professor Filippo Carli carried a detailed study on retail prices.

From January 1934 to 1935 Lantini headed the National Institute for Export, a body created in 1926 to promote the development of Italian trade abroad. He was appointed minister of corporations to the cabinet led by Benito Mussolini on 11 June 1936 and was in office until 31 October 1939. In November 1939 he was named as the president of the Fascist National Institute for Social Security, a body established in March 1933 following the transformation of the National Insurance Fund and his term lasted until 1943. He was the national councillor between March and October 1939 and from 8 July 1940 he was made a member of the paper and printing corporation and subsequently of the pension and credit corporation.

After the fall of Fascism Lantini remained in Rome and did not join the Italian Social Republic. After the Liberation on 20 September 1945 he was arrested and put in the prison of Regina Coeli where he remained for nine months. Following the trial which took place from 15 to 17 June 1946 he was freed and retired from public activity.

== Death ==
Lantini died in Rome on 26 November 1958.
