= Balbino Giuliano =

Italian Fascist politician (1879–1958)

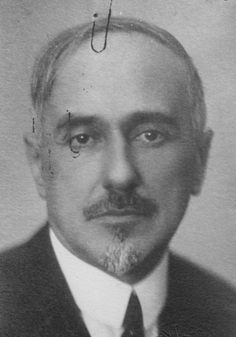

Minister of National Education of the Kingdom of Italy
- In office 12 September 1929 – 20 July 1932
- Preceded by: Giuseppe Belluzzo
- Succeeded by: Francesco Ercole

Undersecretary of State for Public Education of the Kingdom of Italy
- In office 3 July 1924 – 6 January 1925
- Preceded by: Dario Lupi
- Succeeded by: Michele Romano

Member of the Chamber of Deputies of the Kingdom of Italy
- In office 24 May 1924 – 10 January 1934

Member of the Senate of the Kingdom of Italy
- In office 1 March 1934 – 5 August 1943

Personal details
- Born: 4 January 1879 Fossano, Kingdom of Italy
- Died: 13 June 1958 (aged 79) Rome, Italy
- Party: National Fascist Party
- Awards: Order of the Crown of Italy; Order of Saints Maurice and Lazarus; Order of Pope Pius IX; Order of the British Empire

Balbino Giuliano (4 January 1879 – 13 June 1958) was an Italian historian and Fascist politician who served as Minister of National Education of the Kingdom of Italy from 1929 to 1932.

== Biography ==
After graduating in literature and philosophy from the University of Turin, he worked for many years as a high school teacher in Turin (among his pupils in this period was Piero Gobetti, whom he heavily influenced in his early years). A Socialist in his youth, Giuliano later became a liberal close to the positions of Gaetano Salvemini, and an interventist during the First World War, where he served as an artillery second lieutenant. After the war, he participated in Gabriele D'Annunzio's occupation of Fiume.

In 1925 he began his academic career, teaching philosophy and history of philosophy at the University of Florence from 1925 to 1930, ethics at the University of Bologna in 1931-1932, ethics at the University of Rome in 1932 and moral philosophy at the University of Rome from 1932 to 1935. From 1935 to 1940 he was dean of the faculty of literature and philosophy at the University of Rome. As a philosopher, he was a critic of Hegel.

Having become increasingly close to nationalism and Fascism, he became a member of the Italian Nationalist Association and then joined the National Fascist Party (PNF) in 1923, being elected deputy for the PNF in 1924 and again 1929. From 1924 to 1925 he served as Undersecretary of State for the Ministry of Public Education, and in 1929 he was appointed Minister of National Education of the Mussolini Cabinet, a post he held for three years. During his tenure as Minister he imposed an oath of allegiance to the regime on university teachers, which was signed by all but twelve professors. In 1934 he was appointed Senator of the Kingdom of Italy. After the fall of Fascism he retired to private life; after the Second World War he was referred to the High Court of Justice for the Sanctions against Fascism, but was not sentenced due to the Togliatti amnesty.
