= Antonio Chiaramonte Bordonaro =

Italian diplomat

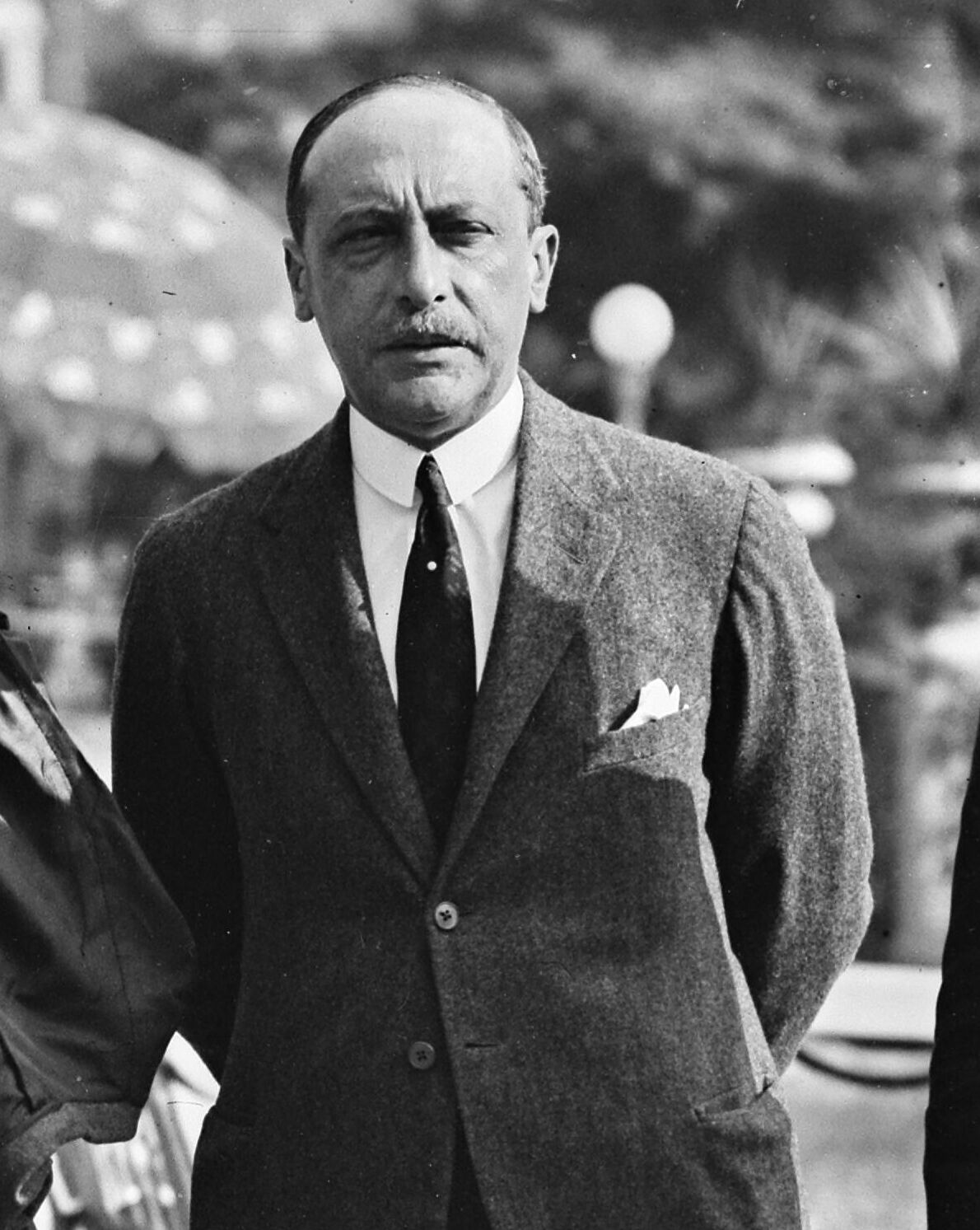
Antonio Chiaramonte Bordonaro in 1925

Antonio Chiaramonte Bordonaro (26 February 1877 – 8 June 1932) was an Italian diplomat.

== Life ==
He was born to a noble Sicilian family, owner of the Castle of Falconara, on the Gulf of Gela, in Butera. He graduated from the School of Social Science of the Istituto Cesare Alfieri in Florence in 1898 and joined the Italian diplomatic service the following year. He was a lover of Franca Florio.

In 1900 he was posted to Trieste, then to Budapest, Bern, and St. Petersburg. In 1913, he was sent to Berlin as legation secretary and was promoted to advisor to the embassy in 1914. On January 4, 1920, he was appointed Envoy Extraordinary and Minister Plenipotentiary to Czechoslovakia. In 1924, he was appointed Italian envoy to Austria.

On April 6, 1926, following Salvatore Contarini's resignation, Chiaramonte Bordonaro was appointed Secretary General of the Ministry of Foreign Affairs, the most important position in Italian diplomacy. He held the office for only ten months, until it was abolished by the Fascist government. On February 6, 1927, Bordonaro was appointed ambassador to the United Kingdom. He died in office on June 8, 1932.

He was appointed Grand Cross of the Czechoslovak Order of the White Lion in 1924 and an honorary Knight Grand Cross of the Order of the British Empire in 1930.
