= 1929 Italian general election =

- 24 March 1929

All 400 seats in the Chamber of Deputies 201 seats needed for a majority
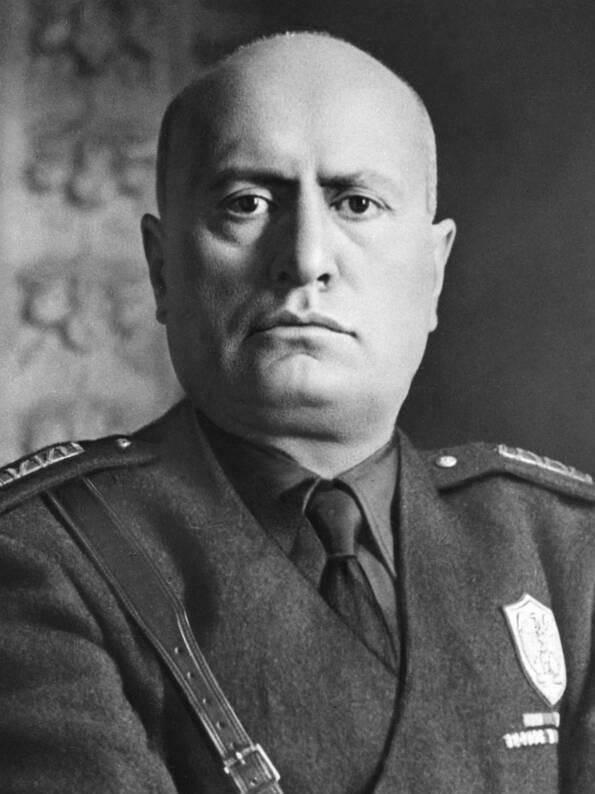
	Majority party
Leader	Benito Mussolini
Party	PNF
Seats won	400
Seat change	▲26
Popular vote	8,517,838
Percentage	98.43%
Swing	▲38.34 pp
Prime Minister before election
Benito Mussolini
PNF
Elected Prime Minister
Benito Mussolini
PNF

General elections were held in Italy on 24 March 1929 to elect the members of the Chamber of Deputies. By this time, the country was a single-party state with the National Fascist Party (PNF) as the only legally permitted party.

Following a parliamentary reform enacted in 1928 by the Chamber of Deputies and Senate, the elections were held in the form of a referendum, with the Grand Council of the PNF, now an official state organ, allowed to compose a single party list to be either approved or rejected by the voters. The list put forward was ultimately approved by 98.43% of voters.

== Electoral system ==
The universal male suffrage, which was legal since 1912, was restricted to men who were members of a trade union or an association, as well as soldiers and members of the clergy. Consequently, only 9.5 million people were able to vote.

The election took place in a plebiscite form: voters could vote "Yes" or "No" to approve the list of deputies appointed by the Grand Council of Fascism. The voter was equipped with two equal-sized sheets, white outside, inside bearing the words "Do you approve the list of members appointed by the Grand National Council of Fascism?" The electoral paper with the "Yes" was also accompanied by the Italian tricolour and a fasces, the "No" one was only a white paper without any symbol.

The voter had to vote at the time of collecting both cards. Inside the voting booth was a first ballot box where the voter left the discarded card and then delivered their chosen paper to the scrutineers, so that they would ensure that it was "carefully sealed"; this process did not assure that the vote was really secret.

Moreover, if the "No" vote had won, the election would have been repeated with other electoral lists.

== Historical background ==
The previous election was shocked by the assassination of socialist leader Giacomo Matteotti, who had requested that the elections be annulled because of gross irregularities and violence against voters, provoked a momentary crisis in the Mussolini government; while Mussolini ordered a cover-up, witnesses saw the car that transported Matteotti's body parked outside Matteotti's residence, which linked Amerigo Dumini to the murder.

Mussolini later confessed that a few resolute men could have altered public opinion, and started a coup that would have swept fascism away. Dumini was imprisoned for two years, but on his release Dumini allegedly told other people that Mussolini had ordered the murder, for which he served further prison time.

Despite this, opposition parties were generally unresponsive as many of the socialists, liberals, and moderates boycotted Parliament in the Aventine Secession, demanding Mussolini's resignation or for Victor Emmanuel to ouster Mussolini.

On 31 December 1924, MVSN consuls met with Mussolini and gave him an ultimatum: crush the opposition or they would do so without him. Fearing a revolt by his own militants, Mussolini decided to drop all trappings of democracy.

On 3 January 1925, Mussolini made a truculent speech before the Chamber in which he took responsibility for squadristi violence (though he did not mention the assassination of Matteotti).

Between 1925 and 1927, Mussolini progressively dismantled virtually all constitutional and conventional restraints on his power, thereby building a police state. A law passed on Christmas Eve 1925 changed Mussolini's formal title from "president of the Council of Ministers" to "head of the government" (though he was still called "Prime Minister" by most non-Italian outlets). He was no longer responsible to Parliament, and could only be removed by the king.

While the Italian constitution stated that ministers were only responsible to the sovereign, in practice it had become all but impossible to govern against the express will of the Parliament. The Christmas Eve law ended this practice, and also made Mussolini the only person competent to determine the body's agenda.

This law transformed Mussolini's government into a de facto legal dictatorship as local autonomy was abolished, and podestàs appointed by the Italian Senate replaced elected mayors and councils.

In 1926, 15-year-old Anteo Zamboni tried to shoot Mussolini in Bologna. This led Mussolini to formally declare the PNF was the only legally permitted party, though Italy had effectively been a one-party state for over a year.

== Results ==
Party	Votes	%	Seats	+/–
National Fascist Party	8,517,838	98.43	400	+26
Against	135,773	1.57	–	–
Total	8,653,611	100.00	400	−135
Valid votes	8,653,611	99.91		
Invalid/blank votes	8,209	0.09		
Total votes	8,661,820	100.00		
Registered voters/turnout	9,638,859	89.86		
Source: Direct Democracy
