= Francesco Ercole =

Italian politician (1884–1945)

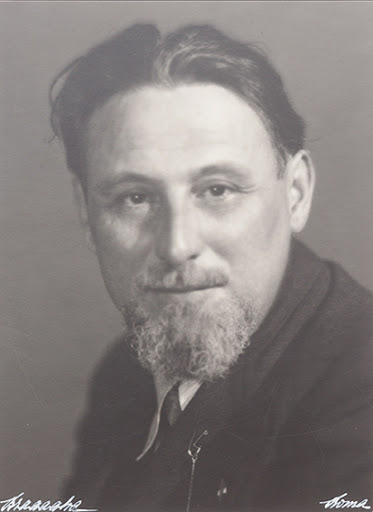

Minister of National Education
- In office 20 July 1932 – 24 January 1935
- Prime Minister: Benito Mussolini
- Preceded by: Balbino Giuliano
- Succeeded by: Cesare Maria De Vecchi

Member of the Chamber of Deputies of the Kingdom of Italy
- In office 20 April 1929 – 2 March 1939

Personal details
- Born: 30 March 1884 La Spezia, Kingdom of Italy
- Died: 18 May 1945 (aged 61) Gardone Riviera, Kingdom of Italy
- Party: Italian National Association; National Fascist Party

Francesco Ercole (30 March 1884 – 18 May 1945) was an Italian historian and a Fascist politician who served as minister of national education of the Kingdom of Italy from 1932 to 1935.

== Biography ==
Ercole was born in La Spezia on 30 March 1884. After graduating in law from the University of Parma in 1907, he taught History of Italian Law at the University of Urbino from 1912, and later became a professor at the universities of Sassari and Cagliari until 1920. On that year he moved to Palermo, where he joined the Italian Nationalist Association (ANI) and became a member of its Central Committee. From 1924 to 1932, he was Rector of the University of Palermo as well as full professor of modern history. In 1923, with the dissolution of the ANI, he passed to the National Fascist Party.

In 1925 he was among the signatories of the Manifesto of the Fascist Intellectuals, drawn up by Giovanni Gentile. He was elected to the Italian Chamber of Deputies in 1929 and again in 1934 until 1939, and served as minister of national education from July 1932 to January 1935. In 1934 he excluded from the school curricula any dialect or idiom or language other than standard Italian, in compliance with the linguistic nationalism imposed by the Fascist regime.

In 1935, after the end of his tenure as minister, he moved to teaching modern history at the Sapienza University of Rome and became President of the Italian Historical Institute for the Modern Age; on 18 June 1936 he became a member of the Accademia dei Lincei. A renowned historian of legal institutions and medieval political thought, he studied in particular the problems concerning the passage from the medieval commune to the signoria and the birth of the principality. He also wrote numerous studies on Dante Alighieri's political views. He died in Gardone Riviera in 1945.
