= Arrigo Solmi =

Italian politician ((1873–1944)

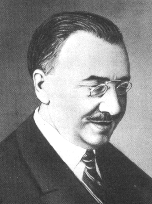

Minister of Grace and Justice
- In office 1935–1939
- Prime Minister: Benito Mussolini

Personal details
- Born: 27 January 1873 Finale Emilia, Kingdom of Italy
- Died: 5 March 1944 (aged 71) Grottaferrata, Kingdom of Italy
- Party: National Fascist Party
- Education: University of Modena

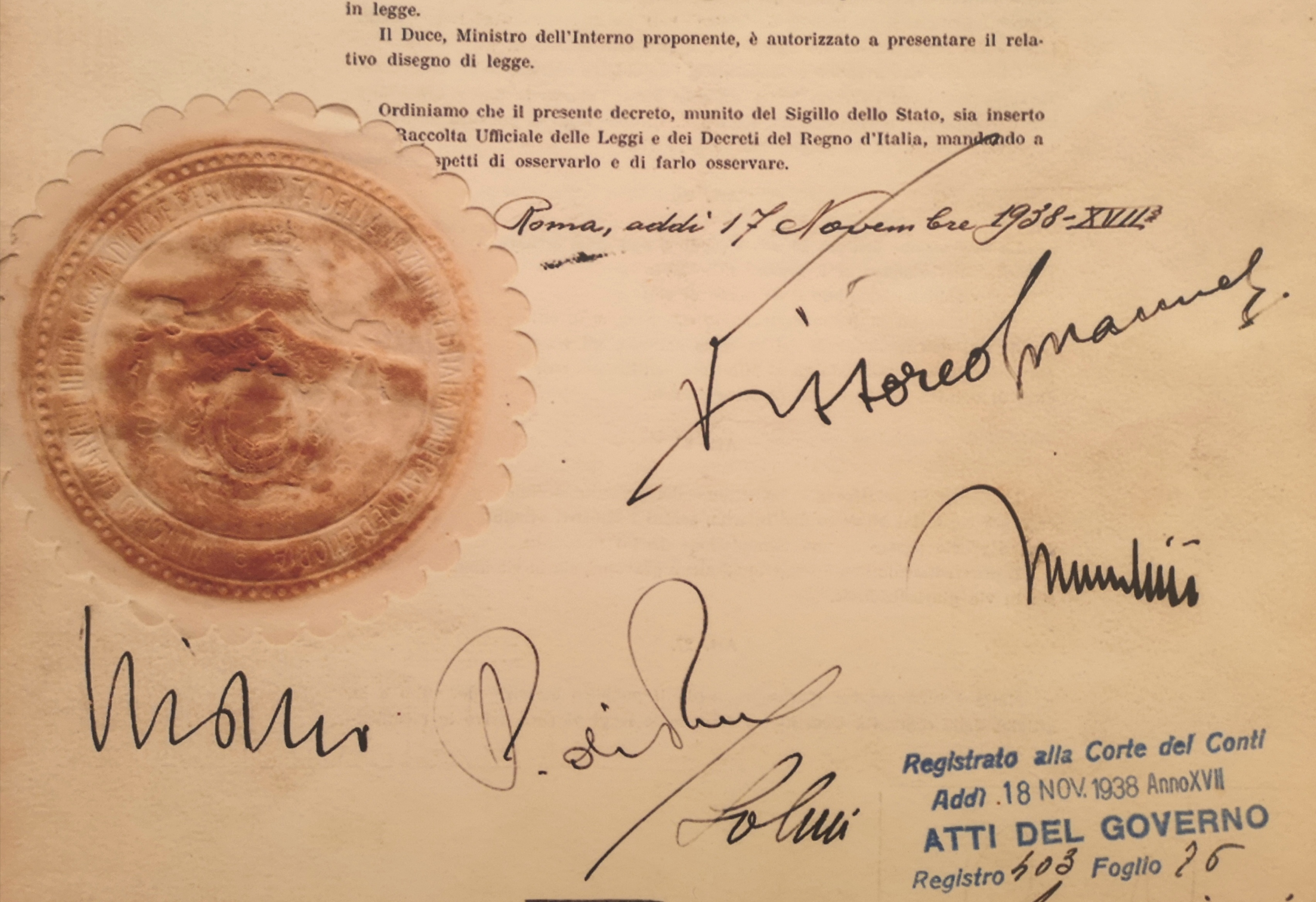
Signatures of Vittorio Emmanuele III, Mussolini, Galeazzo Ciano, Paolo (Thaon) di Revel (President of the Italian Senate) and Arrigo Solmi on a racist law. R.D.L. (Regio Decreto-Legge) 17 novembre 1938, n. 1728 - Provvedimenti per la difesa della razza italiana.

Arrigo Solmi (1873–1944) was an Italian legal scholar. He served as the minister of grace and justice between 1934 and 1939 in the cabinet of Benito Mussolini. He was among the pioneers in the establishment of international relations as an academic subject in Italy.

== Early life and education ==
Solmi was born in Finale Emilia on 27 January 1873. In 1895 he graduated from the University of Modena.

== Career ==
Following his graduation, Solmi worked at the National Library of Palermo. He taught history of Italian law, international law, and constitutional rights at the University of Cagliari between 1902 and 1906. In 1906 he was promoted to professorship and began to teach at the University of Siena and then at the University of Parma. From 1912 he worked at the University of Pavia of which he served as rector. In October 1925 Solmi joined the National Fascist Party led by Benito Mussolini. In 1924, 1929, 1934 and 1939 he was elected to the Italian Parliament. He was named as the undersecretary of national education in 1932. Between 1935 and 1939, he served as the minister of grace and justice.

=== Activities ===
Solmi was one of the scholars who contributed to the establishment of the Institute for International Political Studies. The others were Carlo Emilio Ferri, Giuseppe Gallavresi and Giorgio Mortara.

== Personal life and death ==
Solmi married Ines Dallari on 28 April 1900. He died in Grottaferrata on 5 March 1944.

=== Awards ===
Solmi was the recipient of the following: knight, officer, commander and grand cordon of the Order of the Crown of Italy and knight, officer, grand officer and grand cordon of the Order of Saints Maurice and Lazarus.
