= Chamber of Fasces and Corporations =

Legislature of the Kingdom of Italy, 1939 to 1943

Chamber of Fasces and Corporations Camera dei Fasci e delle Corporazioni
- 30th Legislature of Kingdom of Italy

Type
- Type: Lower house of the Parliament of the Kingdom of Italy

History
- Founded: 19 January 1939
- Disbanded: 5 August 1943

Leadership
- Presidents: Costanzo Ciano (1939); Dino Grandi (1939–1943)

Structure
- Seats: 681 (Note: Data relative to the year 1939.)
- Political groups: PNF (681)

Elections
- Voting system: Members nominated by PNF organs

Meeting place
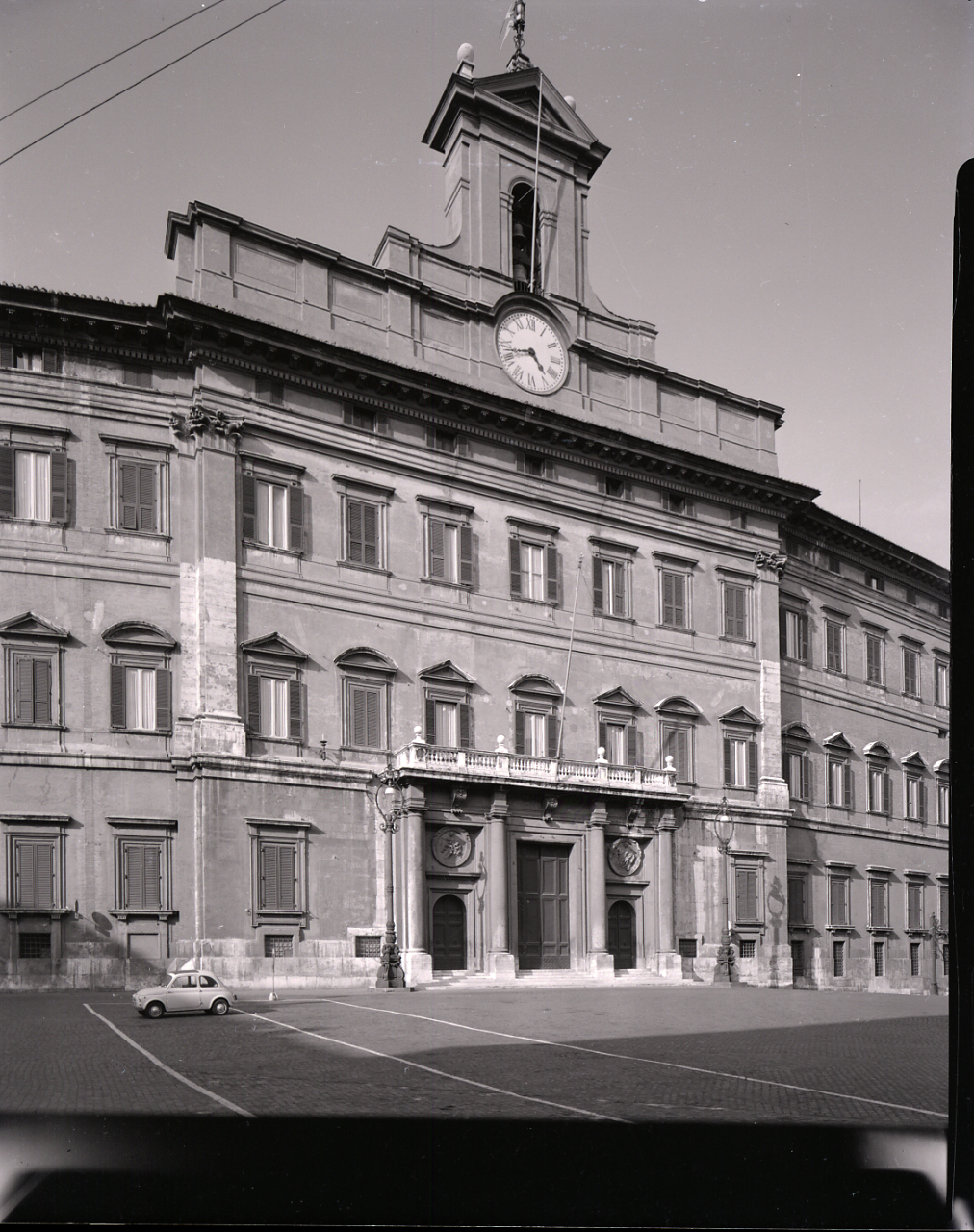
- Palazzo Montecitorio, Rome

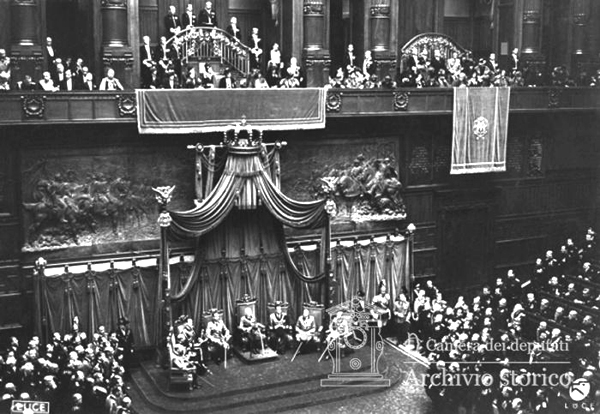
King Victor Emmanuel III inaugurates the Chamber of Fasces and Corporations, 23 March 1939.

Chamber of Fasces and Corporations (Italian: Camera dei Fasci e delle Corporazioni) was the lower house of the legislature of the Kingdom of Italy from 23 March 1939 to 5 August 1943, during the height of the regime of Benito Mussolini's National Fascist Party.

== History ==
It was established on 19 January 1939, to replace the Chamber of Deputies during the 30th legislature of Italy. Members of the chamber were called '"national councillors" (consiglieri nazionali) rather than deputies. The councillors of the chamber did not represent geographic constituencies, but the different trades and industries of Italy, thus reflecting the corporatist idea of fascist ideology.

The chamber's name referred to the fasci, local organisations of the National Fascist Party; and to the proprietary corporations, bodies modelled on guilds which were supposed to represent both workers and employers.

Councillors were elected for terms of undetermined length and automatically lost their seats upon their defection from the branch they did represent. Renewal of the legislature was ordered by decree by the King of Italy, on specific instruction of the head of government (Mussolini).

== Appointment ==
The creation of the Chamber of Fasces and Corporations was the culmination of the progressive curtailment of the independence of the Parliament of the Kingdom of Italy following Mussolini's formal proclamation of dictatorship in 1925. All other parties were formally banned in 1926, though Italy had effectively been a one-party state for a year before then. At the elections of 1929 and 1934, voters were presented with a single list of Fascist candidates chosen by the Grand Council of Fascism.

No elections took place in Italy between 1934 and 1946. Unlike earlier elections for the legislature held under the Fascist era, popular suffrage was eliminated altogether. Instead, the lower house would be a body comprising representatives of the various corporations of Italy, fulfilling Benito Mussolini's vow of creating a "corporate state".

The candidates for the approximately 600 seats were nominated summarily by three organs: the Grand Council, the National Council of the members of the PNF, and the different corporations resembling the entire trade and industry of Italy, canalized through the National Council of Corporations (Consiglio Nazionale delle Corporazioni), effectively in the hands of Mussolini and the PNF.

== Powers and procedures ==
The Chamber of Fasces and Corporations shared the legislative powers with the Government and the Royal Senate.

The only bills that were actually discussed by the plenary assembly, both in the Chamber and in the Senate, were the ones regarding constitutional amendments, legislative delegation and budget laws; the other bills were directly examined and passed by the parliamentary commissions, unless the Chamber, with authorization from the Head of the Government, decided to debate it in the assembly. By order of the Head of the Government, even the laws that required approval by the plenary assembly could be approved directly by the commissions, should urgency reasons require it.

The powers of the Chamber was largely marginal, but it still exercised some influence onto the legislative process: according to Italian historian Renzo de Felice, the parliamentary commissions were often subjected to strong corporate influence, which the fascist government had to deal with.

== Presidents ==
N.	Portrait	Name (Born–Died)	Term of office			Party	Legislature
N.	Portrait	Name (Born–Died)	Took office	Left office	Time in office	Party	Legislature
1		Costanzo Ciano (1876–1939)	23 March 1939	26 June 1939†	95 days	PNF	XXX (no election)
2		Dino Grandi (1895–1988)	30 November 1939	2 August 1943	3 years, 245 days	PNF	XXX (no election)

== See also ==
- Reichstag (Nazi Germany)
- House of Peers (Japan)
