= Giacomo Suardo =

Italian politician

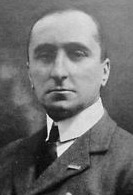
Giacomo Suardo in 1930s.

Giacomo Suardo (25 August 1883 – 20 May 1947) was an Italian lawyer and politician. He served as President of the Italian Senate from 1939 to 1943.

== Life ==
Suardo was born in Bergamo to Luigi Suardo and Giulia Scotti Suardo. He was elected to the Chamber in 1924 for the Fascist Party. He also served as undersecretary of various ministries, and in 1929 King Victor Emmanuel III appointed him Senator. From 1939 he was President of the Italian Senate and he participated in the 25 July 1943 meeting of the Grand Council of Fascism that overthrew Benito Mussolini, although he abstained from the decisive vote regarding Mussolini's deposition. Three days later he resigned the presidency of the Senate, and one year later he was deposed as senator due to his complicity with the fascist regime.

Suardo married Teresa Bottaini. They lived in Bergamo. He was a Count. He had the military rank of Lt. Colonel of the Artillery. He died in Bergamo on 20 May 1947.
