= Dino Grandi =

Italian politician (1895–1988)

Count The Count Grandi of Mordano
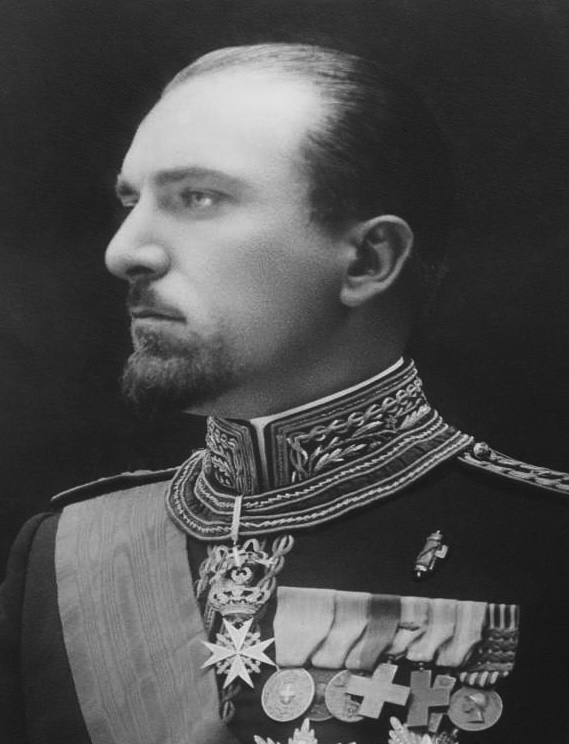
- Grandi in 1937

President of the Chamber of Fasces and Corporations
- In office 30 November 1939 – 5 August 1943
- Preceded by: Costanzo Ciano
- Succeeded by: Office abolished

Minister of Grace and Justice
- In office 12 July 1939 – 5 February 1943
- Prime Minister: Benito Mussolini
- Preceded by: Arrigo Solmi
- Succeeded by: Alfredo De Marsico

Ambassador of Italy to the United Kingdom
- In office 3 August 1932 – 13 October 1939
- Prime Minister: Benito Mussolini
- Preceded by: Antonio Chiaramonte Bordonaro
- Succeeded by: Giuseppe Bastianini

Minister of Foreign Affairs
- In office 12 September 1929 – 20 July 1932
- Prime Minister: Benito Mussolini
- Preceded by: Benito Mussolini
- Succeeded by: Benito Mussolini

Personal details
- Born: 4 June 1895 Mordano, Italy
- Died: 21 May 1988 (aged 92) Bologna, Italy
- Party: FIC (1920–1921); PNF (1921–1943)
- Education: University of Bologna
- Profession: Lawyer politician

Dino Grandi, 1st Conte di Mordano (4 June 1895 – 21 May 1988), was an Italian Fascist politician and ambassador.

== Early life ==
Born at Mordano, province of Bologna, Grandi was a graduate in law and economics at the University of Bologna in 1919 (after serving in World War I). Grandi started a career as a lawyer in Imola. Attracted to the political left, he nonetheless became impressed with Benito Mussolini after the two met in 1914, and became a staunch advocate of Italy's entry into the World War.

He joined the Blackshirts at age 25, and was one of 35 Fascist delegates elected, along with Mussolini, in May 1921 to the Chamber of Deputies. Grandi survived an ambush carried out by leftist militants in 1920, and had his studio devastated on one occasion.

== Fascist statesman ==
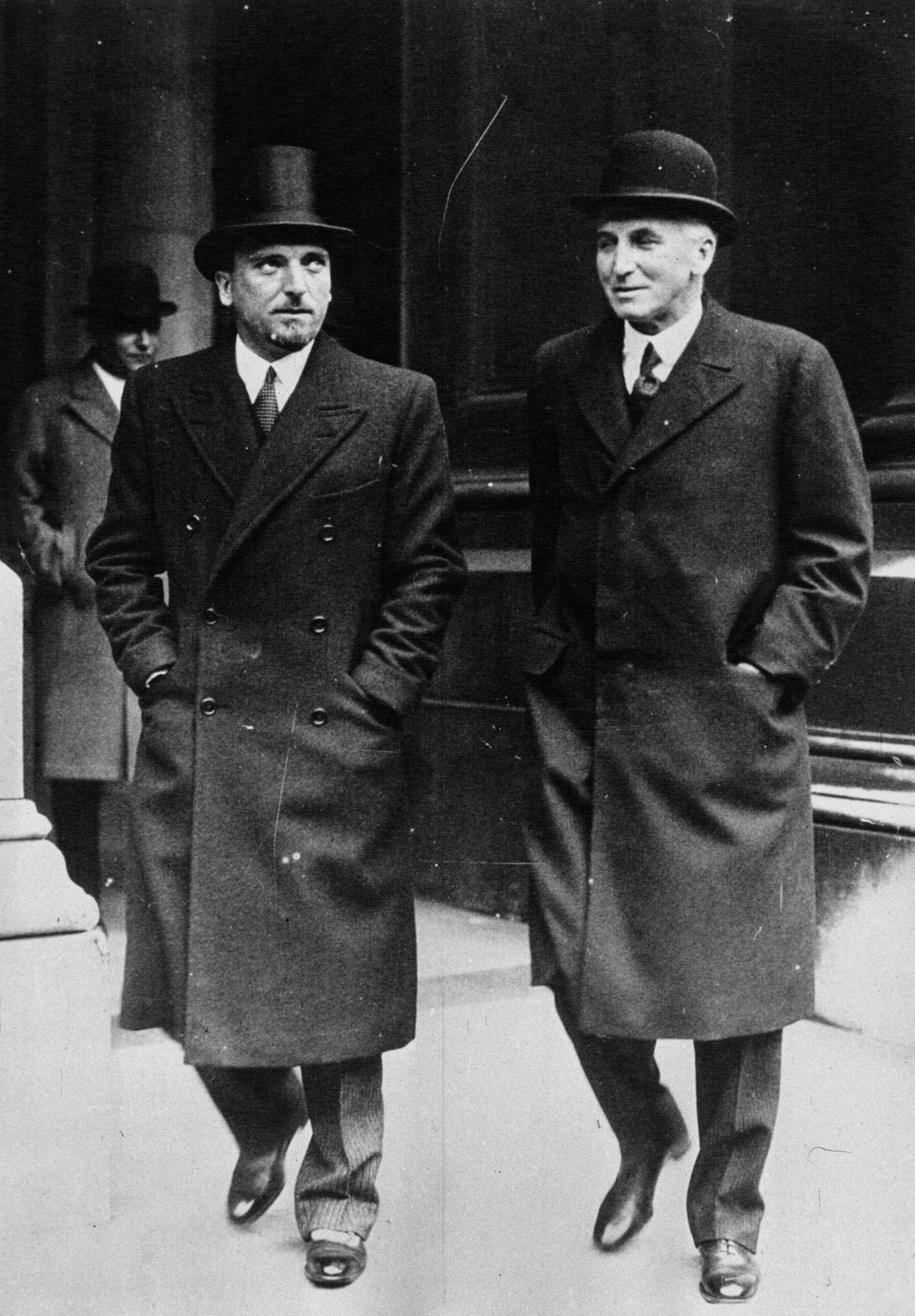
Dino Grandi (left) with the British Foreign Secretary John Simon in 1932

Initially Grandi was an ally to the most radical and violent groups of fascists, always surrounding himself with members of the Blackshirts. He used his power base to voice criticism of Mussolini's attempt to reach an armistice with left-wingers and was at one point under suspicion for having attempted to replace the latter with Gabriele D'Annunzio.

His position subsequently became more cautious. Grandi expressed doubts against the coup, in which the Fascists took power in Italy: so, after the March on Rome on 28 October 1922, the price he paid was reassignment to a lower-profile position.

During the crisis following the Matteotti murder, Dino Grandi’s confidential remarks provided confirmation of Aldo Finzi’s statements concerning Benito Mussolini’s direct responsibility for the murder. On 23 June 1924, he addressed the Fascist squads in Bologna at a demonstration of solidarity with Mussolini, summing up his position in the following words: “The revolution has by now become the State. The safeguards of the revolution can no longer remain entrusted to the Party, but must instead be vested in the organs of the State.” On the same day, Benito Mussolini ordered the Militia to demobilize “the Legions that had been mobilized in recent days.”

On 3 July 1924, he was appointed Undersecretary of State for the Interior, and subsequently served as Undersecretary of State for Foreign Affairs from 14 May 1925 to 12 September 1929, while Mussolini himself held the Foreign Affairs portfolio on an interim basis. He was re-elected to the Chamber of Deputies in 1929. He then served as Minister for Foreign Affairs from 1929 to 1932, when he left the ministry and moved to London in July. There he served as Italian Ambassador to the United Kingdom until 1939.

In 1939, he was recalled to Italy after attempting a pact between his country and Britain to prevent Italy from entering World War II. Under pressure from Hitler, Mussolini removed him from the post of ambassador and appointed him Minister of Justice. As a diplomat, Grandi created a net of connections that were rivaled only by Mussolini's son-in-law, Galeazzo Ciano, and he attempted to use it for his own gains. Thus, he persuaded King Victor Emmanuel III to grant him a title in 1937, and he managed to retain a comfortable position until he was sent by Mussolini to the Greek Front with the other Gerarchi in 1941. As Mussolini's ambassador to London, he had affairs with some of the most influential noblewomen of the time, including Lady Alexandra Curzon, daughter of the Viceroy of India, George Curzon.

Grandi opposed the antisemitic Italian racial laws of 1938, and the country's entry into World War II. He was dropped from the Cabinet in February 1943 for his increasing criticism of the war effort.

== Fall of Mussolini and aftermath ==
As the war began to have its devastating effect on Italy after the Allied invasion of Sicily, Grandi and other members of the Fascist Grand Council met on 24 July 1943. When Mussolini said that the Germans were thinking of evacuating the south, Grandi launched a blistering attack on his former comrade-in-arms. Knowing the risk he was taking by doing so, he had brought two hand grenades with him, along with going to confession and revising his will before the meeting. He then made a motion (Ordine del giorno Grandi) asking King Victor Emmanuel III to resume his full constitutional authority. The resolution, voted at 2:00 on 25 July, passed by a vote of 19 to 8, with one abstention, effectively removing Mussolini from office. Those leading government figures who had voted for the resolution included Giuseppe Bottai and Emilio De Bono as well as Grandi. The King had Mussolini arrested the same day. Grandi also negotiated a truce with the left-wing movements, notably with the trade unions (grouped in the Confederazione Generale Italiana del Lavoro), which gave way to the Italian resistance movement against Nazi Germany.

While the Allies occupied the south, an alternate Fascist government was established in Northern Italy as the Italian Social Republic. It sentenced Grandi to death in absentia for treason in the Verona trial that took place from 8 to 10 January 1944. Grandi, however, had made sure to flee to Francisco Franco's Spain in August 1943. He lived there, then in Portugal (1943–1948), Argentina, and then São Paulo, Brazil, until he returned to Italy in the 1960s.

In May 1988 he died in Bologna aged 92, mostly forgotten by the general population.

Political offices
Preceded by Benito Mussolini	Italian Minister of Foreign Affairs; 1929–1932	Succeeded by Benito Mussolini
Preceded by Costanzo Ciano	President of the Italian Chamber of Deputies; 1939–1943	Succeeded by Vittorio Emanuele Orlando
