= Government of the Italian Social Republic =

Fascist italian government

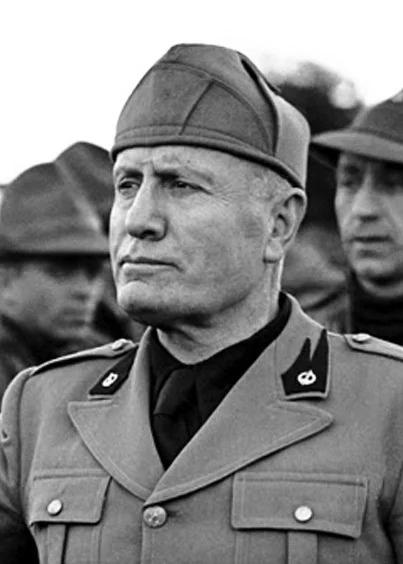
- Date formed: 23 September 1943
- Date dissolved: 25 April 1945

People and organisations
- Duce: Benito Mussolini
- Head of government: Benito Mussolini
- No. of ministers: 13
- Total no. of members: 17
- Member party: Republican Fascist Party
- Status in legislature: Sole legal party

History
- Incoming formation: Operation Achse
- Outgoing formation: Surrender of the Italian Social Republic

The Government of the Italian Social Republic held office from 23 September 1943 until 25 April 1945, a total of 1 year, 274 days.

== Government parties ==
The government was composed by the following party:

Party	Ideology	Leader
Republican Fascist Party	Fascism	Benito Mussolini

== Composition ==
Cabinet members
Portfolio	Minister	Took office	Left office	Ref
Head of Government, Duce, and Minister of Foreign Affairs	Benito Mussolini	23 September 1943	25 April 1945	
Minister of the Interior	Guido Buffarini Guidi	23 September 1943	21 February 1945	
Minister of the Interior	Paolo Zerbino	21 February 1945	25 April 1945	
Minister of Grace and Justice	Antonino Tringali Casanuova	23 September 1943	30 October 1943 †	
Minister of Grace and Justice	Piero Pisenti	30 October 1943	25 April 1945	
Minister of Finance	Domenico Pellegrini Giampietro	23 September 1943	25 April 1945	
Minister of National Defence	Rodolfo Graziani	23 September 1943	25 April 1945	
Minister of National Economy	Carlo Alberto Biggini	23 September 1943	25 April 1945	
Minister of Corporative Economy	Silvio Gai	23 September 1943	31 December 1943	
Minister of Corporative Economy	Angelo Tarchi	1 January 1944	25 April 1945	
Minister of Public Works	Ruggero Romano	23 September 1943	25 April 1945	
Minister of Agriculture and Forests	Edoardo Moroni	23 September 1943	25 April 1945	
Minister of Popular Culture	Ferdinando Mezzasoma	23 September 1943	25 April 1945	
Minister of Labour	Giuseppe Spinelli	23 September 1943	25 April 1945	
Minister of Communications	Giuseppe Peverelli	23 September 1943	5 October 1943	
Minister of Communications	Augusto Liverani	5 October 1943	25 April 1945	
Minister of State's Activities	Renato Ricci	23 September 1943	25 April 1945	
