= Tarchi =

Tarchi is an Italian surname. Notable people with this surname include:

- Angelo Tarchi (composer) (c. 1760–1814), Italian composer
- Angelo Tarchi (politician) (1897–1974), Italian politician
- Marco Tarchi (born 1952), Italian political scientist
