= Military ranks of Italy =

Military ranks of Italy may refer to:

- Military ranks of the Kingdom of Italy, the ranks of the armed forces of the Kingdom of Italy (1861–1946), including Fascist Italy (1922–1943)
- Military ranks of the Italian Social Republic, the ranks of armed forces of the Italian Social Republic (1943–1945), the continuation of the Fascist regime in northern Italy under Nazi German sponsorship
- Italian Air Force ranks, ranks of the air force of the Italian Republic (1946–present)
- Italian Army ranks, ranks of the army of the Italian Republic (1946–present)
- Italian Navy ranks, ranks of the navy of the Italian Republic (1946–present)
