= Giuseppe Spinelli =

Giuseppe Spinelli may refer to:

- Giuseppe Spinelli (cardinal)
- Giuseppe Spinelli (politician)
