= Military ranks of the Italian Social Republic =

The Military ranks of the Italian Social Republic were the military insignia used by the National Republican Army of the Italian Social Republic. The ranks were essentially the same as the military ranks of the Kingdom of Italy, however, with the symbols of the monarchy removed.

== Special insignia ==
| Rank group | Honorary |
|---|---|
Primo Maresciallo dell'Impero
First marshal of the empire

== Commissioned officer ranks ==
The rank insignia of commissioned officers.

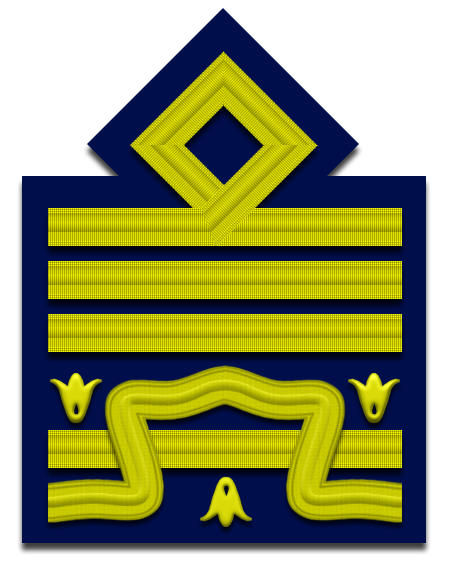
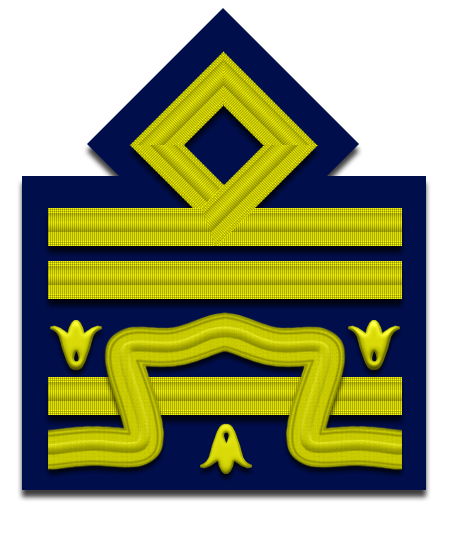
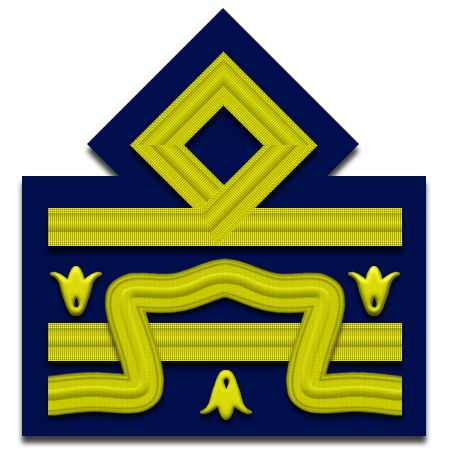
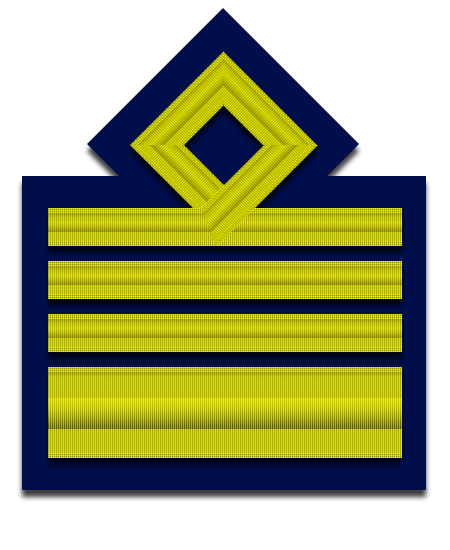
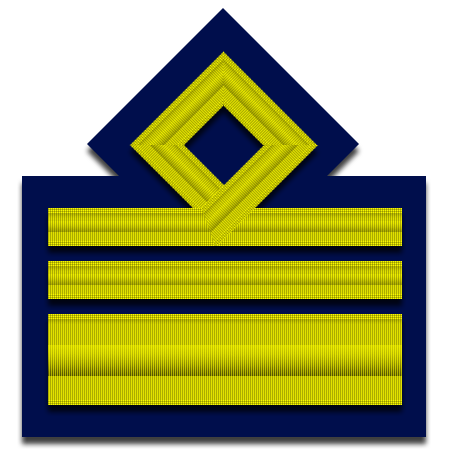
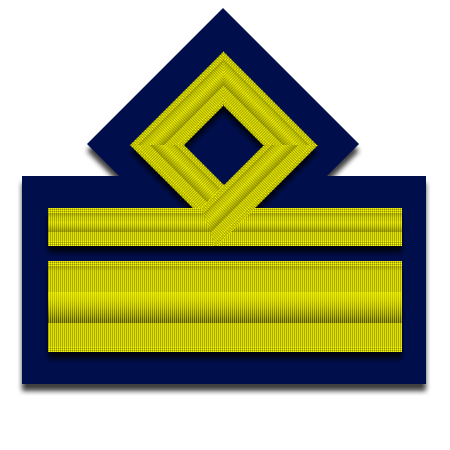
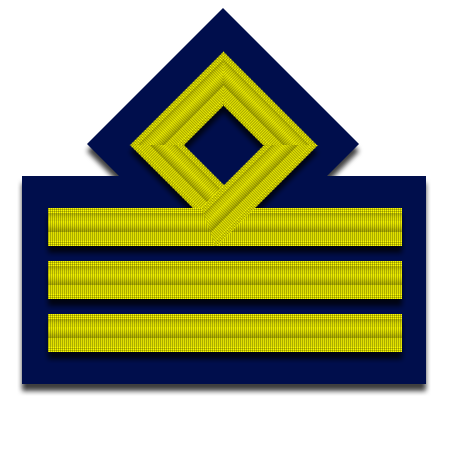
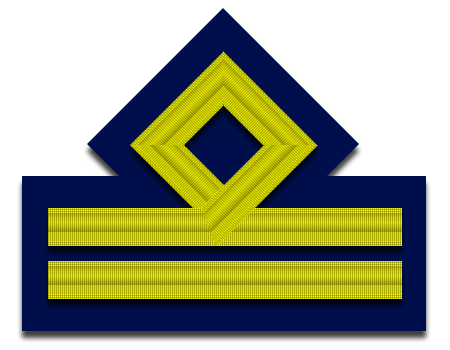
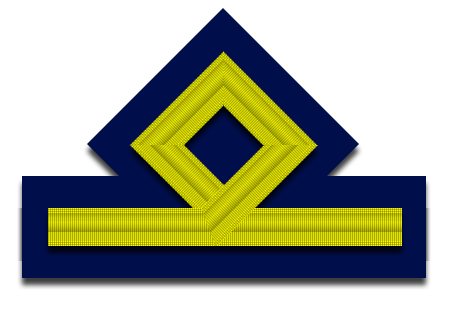
| Rank group | General / flag officers | | | | | Senior officers | | | | Junior officers |
|---|---|---|---|---|---|---|---|---|---|---|---|---|
| National Republican Army |
| National Republican Army | Maresciallo d'Italia | Generale d'Armata | Generale di Corpo d'Armata | Generale di Divisione | Generale di Brigata | Colonnello | | Tenente Colonnello | Maggiore | Capitano | Tenente | Sottotenente |
| National Republican Navy |
| National Republican Navy | | | Ammiraglio | Vice ammiraglio | Contrammiraglio | Capitano di vascello | | Capitano di fregata | Capitano di corvetta | Tenente di vascello | Sottotenente di vascello | Guardiamarina |
| National Republican Air Force |
| National Republican Air Force | | | Generale di squadra aerea | Generale di divisione aerea | Generale di brigata aerea | Colonnello | | Tenente Colonnello | Maggiore | Capitano | Tenente | Sottotenente |
| National Republican Guard |
| National Republican Guard | | | Generale | Tenente generale | Maggiore generale | Colonnello | | Tenente colonnello | Maggiore | Capitano | Tenente | Sottotenente |
| (Italian Social Republic) Female Auxiliary Service |
| (Italian Social Republic) Female Auxiliary Service | | | | | Comandante generale | Vice comandante generale | Ispettrice | | Comandante raggruppamento | Comandante provinciale | Vice comandante provinciale | Comandante di gruppo |
| Rank group | General / flag officers | | | | | Senior officers | | | | Junior officers |

=== Special ranks ===
| Rank group |
|---|---|---|
| | Generale di divisione (tipo definitivo) | Colonnello I. G. S. |

== Other ranks ==
The rank insignia of non-commissioned officers and enlisted personnel.

| Rank group | Senior NCOs | | | | | | Junior NCOs | Enlisted |
|---|---|---|---|---|---|---|---|---|---|---|---|
| National Republican Army | | | | | | | | | | | No insignia |
| National Republican Army | Aiutante di battaglia | Maresciallo maggiore | Maresciallo capo | Maresciallo ordinario | Sergente maggiore | Sergente | Caporal maggiore | Caporale | Appuntato | Soldato scelto | Soldato |
| National Republican Navy | | | | | | | | | | No insignia |
| National Republican Navy | Capo di prima classe | | Capo di seconda classe | Capo di terza classe | Secondo capo | Sergente | Sottocapo | Comune di 1ª classe | | Comune di 2ª classe |
| National Republican Air Force | | | | | | | | | | No insignia |
| National Republican Air Force | Maresciallo di prima classe | | Maresciallo di seconda classe | Maresciallo di terza classe | Sergente maggiore | Sergente | Primo aviere | Aviere scelto | | Aviere |
| National Republican Guard | | | | | | | | | | No insignia |
| National Republican Guard | Primo aiutante | | Aiutante capo | Aiutante | Brigadiere | Vice brigadiere | | Milite scelto | | Milite |
| (Italian Social Republic) Female Auxiliary Service | | | | | | | | | | No insignia |
| (Italian Social Republic) Female Auxiliary Service | | | | Capo nucleo | | Vice capo nucleo | | Ausiliaria scelta | | Ausiliaria |
| Rank group | Senior NCOs | | | | | | Junior NCOs | Enlisted |
