= Ines Donati =

Italian fascist political activist

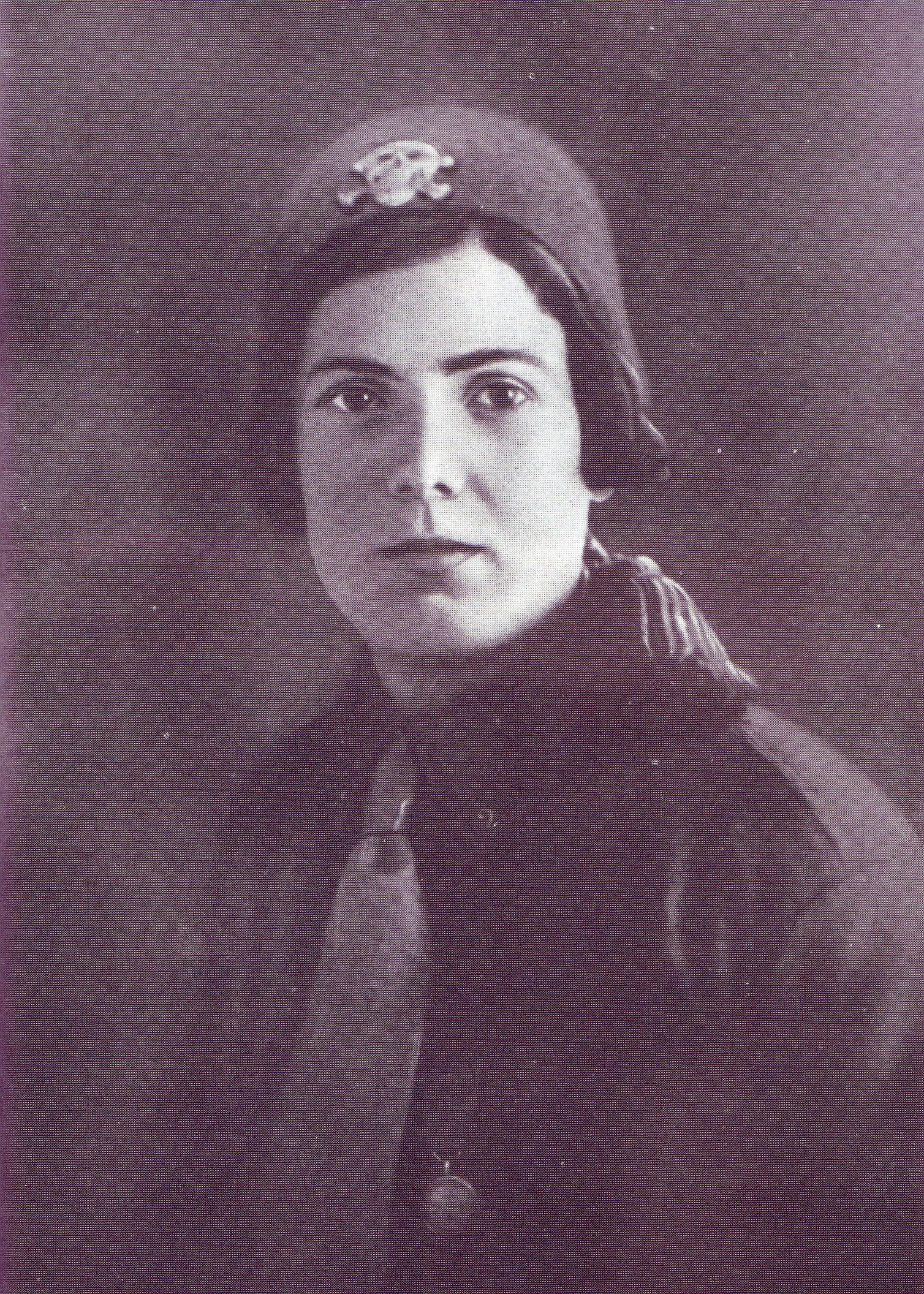
- Born: 8 June 1900; San Severino Marche
- Died: 3 November 1924 (aged 24); Matelica
- Education: Accademia di Belle Arti di Roma
- Occupations: Fascist and political activist
- Organization(s): Corpo Nazionale Giovani Esploratori ed Esploratrici Italiani; Sempre Pronti
- Political party: Italian Nationalist Association

Ines Donati (8 June 1900 – 3 November 1924) was a political activist and a supporter of the first wave of Italy's Fascist movement.

== Early years ==
Ines Donati was the daughter of David Donati, a shoemaker, and Ludmilla Bertolli, a clockmaker. She was described as a short girl with dark hair. She was a nationalist supporter from a young age, during the World War I years, and became known as "La Capitana" (the Captain) and "La Patriottica" (the Patriot).

At age 18, Donati moved to Rome to pursue her education. She attended a convent school in Trastevere, where she studied Fine Arts. In Trastevere, she became involved in popular youth organizations such as Corpo Nazionale Giovani Esploratori ed Esploratrici Italiani (CNGEI, National Corps of Young Italian Scouts and Guides), similar to the Scouting and Girl Guides organizations in the English-speaking countries. She also joined the Italian Nationalist Association, and the Gruppo Giovanile Ruggero Fauro (Ruggero Fauro Youth Group) established by the Italian nationalist and irredentist Ruggero Timeus. She was the only female member of the Rome Italian nationalist group "Sempre Pronti" (Always Ready).

She attended the Accademia di Belle Arti di Roma with Piera Gatteschi Fondelli, both later enrolled in the Fasci Italiani di Combattimento on the same day.

During a 1920 labour strike by garbage collectors in Rome, Donati was one of two women (the other being Maria Rygier) who engaged in street cleaning. She also worked as a mail carrier and electrician during this period.

The following year, during the 1921 Italian General Election, Donati participated in the civil voluntary service and created propaganda for the Fascist national candidates. On February 18, 1921, at the Caffè Aragno in Rome, near the Montecitorio Palace, the Deputy of the Italian Socialist Party, Alceste Della Seta, was beaten, the second attack that he suffered. The first planned target of the attack was Nicola Bombacci, one of the founders of the Communist Party of Italy. She was arrested and spent one month in jail in connection with the attack. On July 31 she was attacked by the anti-Fascist group Arditi del Popolo in Trastevere, who spent 20 days in hospital as a result. In 1921 she received what Fascists would later call her "battesimo del fuoco" (baptism by fire) at Ravenna, the location of a nationalist congress; Luigi Federzoni described her as "fearless, standing between the whistle of bullets".

== Squadrismo and death ==
In 1922, Donati was diagnosed with tuberculosis, which was difficult to treat at the time and usually resulted in death. Mussolini's March on Rome that year, viewed as a power grab, instigated the Italian General Strike by opponents of Fascism. The strike was organized by Alleanza del Lavoro (a 1922 labour group coalition) as well as Ancona. It had a disruptive effect on rail service. On August 2, a train derailed at Osimo. This resulted in the death of the firefighter Attilio Forlani, who was a veteran and a Fascist supporter, and many passengers were injured. Donati, although ill, took part in violent actions against strikers on August 5. With a paramilitary group, the squadrismo, nationalists, many coming from Central Italy, succeeded in occupying the city. Two strikers were killed, Amilcare Biancheria and Giuseppe Morelli.

On September 28, Donati took part in rescue operations after a gunpowder explosion destroyed several homes in Pitelli. Donati was one of only several women who joined the Fascist March on Rome; After reaching Ancona, and possessing two pistols, she took a train to the capitol, and personally met Mussolini. In 1923 she applied to join the paramilitary Blackshirts (Voluntary Militia for National Security), created that year; on March 4, Mussolini responded: "I have known of her fame for a long time and know that she is a fierce Italian, an indomitable fascist".

In 1924, her health deteriorated. She died of tuberculosis on November 3, in Matelica, at the age of 24 years, and was proclaimed a martyr by the Fascists. Some historians believe her last words were, "I wanted to be strong like a man, but forgot that I am a frail woman". The Fascist establishment in fact opposed Donati's assertive behaviour in support of their causes, a disinhibition that could "damage the movement in public opinion" The Fascists, according to their mentality, believed that woman should submit to man, in subjection and inferiority, and prohibited any political activity by women.

Her reputation was used in propaganda by the Fascists however, and on the request of Achille Starace, Donati's body was exhumed on March 23, 1933, and reburied at the Chapel of Heroes at the Verano cemetery in Rome. She was made into a heroine and an icon of youth. In 1926, a health clinic in Matelica was dedicated to her.

On October 17, 1937, a bronze statue of Donati was dedicated, designed by Rutilio Ceccolini and sculptor Luigi Gabrielli, in the vicinity of the square San Severino Marche. The presentation speech was delivered by Wanda Bruschi, wife of Raphael Gorjux and an important provincial fascist. The work was removed by the partisans in 1944, and rebuilt into a memorial to victims of all wars.

== See also ==
- Fascism
- Maria Rygier
- Squadrismo
- San Severino Marche
