= Vittorio Cini =

Italian politician (1885–1977)

Count Vittorio Cini
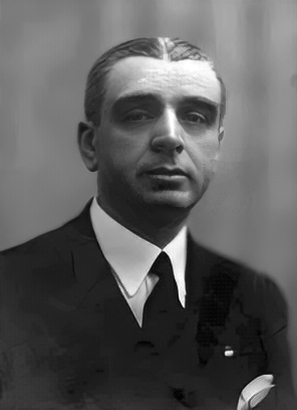

Minister of Communications of the Kingdom of Italy
- In office 6 February 1943 – 24 July 1943
- Preceded by: Giovanni Host-Venturi
- Succeeded by: Giuseppe Peverelli
- Member of the Senate of the Kingdom of Italy
- In office 3 May 1934 – 5 August 1943

Personal details
- Born: 20 February 1885 Ferrara, Kingdom of Italy
- Died: 18 September 1977 (aged 92) Venice, Italy
- Party: National Fascist Party

Military service
- Allegiance: Kingdom of Italy
- Branch/service: Royal Italian Army
- Battles/wars: World War I

Vittorio Cini, Conte di Monselice (20 February 1885 – 18 September 1977) was an Italian industrialist and politician, Senator from 1934 to 1943 and minister of communications of the Kingdom of Italy from February to July 1943. He was among the richest people in Italy in his time.

== Biography ==
The son of Giorgio Cini, a pharmacist from Ferrara, and of Eugenia Berti, he inherited from his father some trachyte quarries in Veneto and some lands in the Ferrara area. After studying economics and commerce in Switzerland, he was the first to undertake important reclamation works in Italy (Pineta di Destra and Giussago), wrestling land from the erosion caused by the sea. He also carried out canalization works and designed a network for the inland navigation of the Po Valley. In 1918 he married actress Lyda Borelli, who gave him one son, Giorgio (born in 1918), and three daughters, Minna (born in 1920), Yana and Ylda (twins, born in 1924).

After fighting in the First World War, Cini dedicated himself to enhancing his adopted city, Venice, laying the foundations for the construction of the port of Marghera. In the period between the two wars Cini, along with his fraternal friend Giuseppe Volpi, was one of the main exponents of the so-called "Venetian group" of businesspeople, of which he was considered the "financial mind". His business activities developed mainly in the financial, steel, electrical, maritime, tourism and insurance sectors. He was later entrusted with the management of the ILVA steelworks, which was in poor economic conditions. He served on the board of directors of SADE from 1924 to 1943, and from 1936 to 1943 he was Commissioner-General of the Universal Exposition of Rome, which however never took place due to the outbreak of World War II. In the same period he also joined the National Fascist Party, becoming a Senator in 1934. On 16 May 1940 he was awarded the title of Count of Monselice.

In February 1943 Cini was appointed minister of communications by Benito Mussolini, but he resigned after six months due to profound differences with the dictator (on 19 June 1943, during the last cabinet meeting, he had confronted the Duce and told him that it was necessary to find a time and a way to withdraw from the war). After the armistice of Cassibile he was arrested by the Germans in Rome and imprisoned in the Dachau concentration camp; his son Giorgio, having sold the jewels of his mother, bribed the SS commanders and secured his release, after which he escaped to Switzerland, where he was reunited with Volpi, who had also fled there. While in Switzerland, Cini and Volpi became friends with members of the future Christian Democracy.

After the death in a flight accident of his son Giorgio in 1949, Cini withdrew completely from business and politics for a few years, dedicating his life to works of philanthropy. He obtained a concession from the state for an entire island, San Giorgio Maggiore, in front of the shore of Piazza San Marco, and after having financed the important necessary restoration work, he established the Cini Foundation, a center of art and culture, home to institutes for professional preparation and training of young people for life on the sea. Following the profound spiritual crisis due to the death of his son, he moved away from the Freemasonry of Ferrara, which he had frequented for a long time, and approached the Jesuit order.

In 1953, after the death of the president of SADE Achille Gaggia, a close and faithful collaborator of Volpi and of the "Venetian group", Cini assumed the presidency of the company, which was nationalized in 1962–1963, and held it until the incorporation of Sade into Montecatini, decided in August 1964 and carried out in 1966. As president of SADE from 1953 to 1964, during the period of the design and construction of the Vajont dam and the subsequent Vajont disaster, he was called to testify during the trial that followed. In the trial, however, he was recognized as having no responsibility in the disaster, due to his purely financial role within SADE.

He died in Venice on 18 September 1977 and was buried in the monumental cemetery of the Certosa di Ferrara.
