= Ministry of Popular Culture =

Italian government agency from 1937 to 1944

Minister of Popular Culture
- Ministro della Cultura Popolare
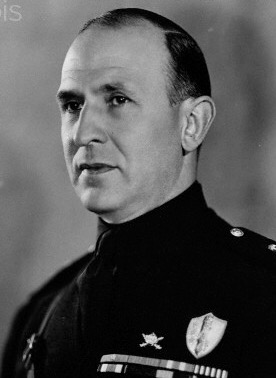
- Longest serving Dino Alfieri; 11 June 1936 – 31 October 1939
- Abbreviation: MinCulPop
- Member of: Council of Ministers; Grand Council of Fascism
- Reports to: Duce
- Seat: Rome
- Term length: No fixed term
- Formation: 23 June 1935
- First holder: Galeazzo Ciano
- Final holder: Fernando Mezzasoma
- Abolished: 25 April 1945

The Ministry of Popular Culture (Italian: Ministero della Cultura Popolare, commonly abbreviated to MinCulPop) was a ministry of the Italian government from 1937 to 1944.

== History ==
It was established by the Fascist government in 1922 as the Press Office of the Presidency of the Council, before being renamed to Press Office of the Head of Government in 1925. In 1934 it became the Secretariat for Press and Propaganda. It became a ministry in 1935 and was given its definitive designation in 1937. During its existence, it controlled most of the literary and radio channels in Italy. It was the Italian analogue of the German Reich Ministry of Public Enlightenment and Propaganda.

The Ministry financed various Fascist publications, including La Difesa della Razza. It famously outlawed the importation and translation of all American comic books, with the lone exception of Mickey Mouse, in 1938.

The Ministry was officially suppressed by the Kingdom of Italy on 3 July 1944, having remained vacant ever since the overthrow of Benito Mussolini in the 25 Luglio coup a year earlier. During the Italian Social Republic, Mussolini revived the Ministry of Popular Culture and appointed Ferdinando Mezzasoma as its head.

== List of ministers ==
=== Kingdom of Italy ===
Parties

- National Fascist Party

Coalitions

- Fascist

Portrait	Name (Born–Died)	Term of office			Party	Government	Ref.
Portrait	Name (Born–Died)	Took office	Left office	Time in office	Party	Government	Ref.
Minister of Press and Propaganda
	Galeazzo Ciano (1903–1944)	23 June 1935	11 June 1936	354 days	National Fascist Party	Mussolini	
	Dino Alfieri (1886–1966)	11 June 1936	27 May 1937	350 days	National Fascist Party	Mussolini	
Minister of Popular Culture
	Dino Alfieri (1886–1966)	27 May 1937	31 October 1939	2 years, 157 days	National Fascist Party	Mussolini	
	Alessandro Pavolini (1903–1945)	31 October 1939	6 February 1943	3 years, 98 days	National Fascist Party	Mussolini	
	Gaetano Polverelli (1886–1960)	6 February 1943	25 July 1943	169 days	National Fascist Party	Mussolini	

=== Italian Social Republic ===
Parties

- Republican Fascist Party

Coalitions

- Fascist

Portrait	Name (Born–Died)	Term of office			Party	Government	Ref.
Portrait	Name (Born–Died)	Took office	Left office	Time in office	Party	Government	Ref.
Minister of Popular Culture
	Ferdinando Mezzasoma (1907–1945)	23 September 1943	25 April 1945	1 year, 274 days	Republican Fascist Party	Mussolini (Social Republic)	

== See also ==
- Propaganda of Fascist Italy
- Censorship in Italy
- Reichs Ministry of Public Enlightenment and Propaganda
