= Giuseppe Peverelli =

Italian Fascist politician (1893–1969)

Minister of Communications of the Kingdom of Italy
- In office 24 July 1943 – 25 July 1943
- Preceded by: Vittorio Cini
- Succeeded by: Federico Amoroso

Minister of Communications of the Italian Social Republic
- In office 23 September 1943 – 5 October 1943
- Preceded by: office created
- Succeeded by: Augusto Liverani

Undersecretary of State for Communications of the Kingdom of Italy
- In office 13 February 1943 – 24 July 1943

Member of the Chamber of Fasces and Corporations
- In office 23 March 1939 – 5 August 1943

Personal details
- Born: 19 December 1893 Turin, Kingdom of Italy
- Died: 1969 (aged 75) Montevideo, Uruguay
- Party: National Fascist Party; Republican Fascist Party

Military service
- Allegiance: Kingdom of Italy
- Branch/service: Royal Italian Army
- Battles/wars: World War I

Giuseppe Peverelli (Turin, 19 December 1893 – Montevideo, 1969) was an Italian industrialist and Fascist politician, who served as Minister of Communications for one day in the Mussolini Cabinet in July 1943 and then again in the Italian Social Republic from September to October 1943.

== Biography ==
Holding a degree in engineering, he was an assistant teacher at the Polytechnic of Turin and practiced the profession of engineer. He took part as a volunteer in the First World War, and after the war he joined the National Fascist Party; during the Fascist period he was President of the National Marble Federation from 1928 to 1934 (his family owned a granite quarry near Lake Orta) and a member of the board of directors of Confindustria from 1934 to 1943. In 1939, he became a member of the Chamber of Fasces and Corporations. After serving as Undersecretary of State for Communications from 13 February 1943, on 24 July 1943 he was appointed Minister of Communications, replacing Vittorio Cini who had resigned, but his tenure lasted only one day, as on 25 July 1943 Mussolini was deposed following a no confidence vote by the Grand Council of Fascism. After the armistice of Cassibile he joined the Italian Social Republic and served as its Minister of Communications from its establishment on 23 September 1943 to 5 October of the same year, when he was replaced by Augusto Liverani. After the war he fled to Argentina, where he founded a stone-cutting company, and later to Montevideo, Uruguay, where he died in 1969.
