= Piera Gatteschi Fondelli =

Italian military commander

- Born: 22 August 1902; Poppi, Tuscany, Italy
- Died: 7 September 1985 (aged 83); Rome, Italy
- Burial place: Greve in Chianti
- Military career
- Allegiance: Italian Social Republic
- Branch: Female Auxiliary Service
- Service years: 1944-1945
- Rank: Generale di brigata
- Commands: Commander of the Female Auxiliary Service (1944–45)
- Conflicts: Second World War

Piera Fondelli Gatteschi (22 August 1902 - 7 September 1985) was the commander of the Female Auxiliary Service of the Italian Social Republic, a member of the National Fascist Party and a participant in the March on Rome.

== Early life ==
Piera Fondelli was born in Poppi in Tuscany. Her father died before her birth and she moved to Rome with her mother before 1914. On 23 March 1921, she enrolled in the Fasci Italiani di Combattimento in Rome with Ines Donati with whom she attended the Accademia di Belle Arti di Roma. On 19 October 1922 she took part in the PNF congress held in Naples and on 28 October, the twenty-year-old Piera was the head of a small group of twenty women who formed the "honor squad escorting the pennant" and with them participated in the March on Rome.

She then became inspector of the Federation of the Urbe, taking care of the Opera nazionale maternità e infanzia, of the Italian Red Cross. In 1936 she left her post to follow Count Mario Gatteschi in Italian East Africa, whom she married becoming the Countess Gatteschi Fondelli, an engineer who directed the works on the Assab-Addis Ababa road. When, three years later, she returned to Italy, Mussolini appointed her a Trustee of the Female Fasci of the City which had 150,000 members and in 1940 a national inspector for the party.

After the fall of fascism on 25 July 1943, she took refuge with her in-laws in the Casentino, while her husband, who returned to Africa as a fighter, was imprisoned by the British in Kenya. Informed that Mussolini was freed and founded the Italian Social Republic in Northern Italy, Piera moved to Brescia and started a new collaboration with Alessandro Pavolini, the party secretary. Here, at the end of 1943, Piera wrote to the Mussolini the desire of fascist women to have a more incisive role in the defense of the country, a project supported by Pavolini and accepted by Rodolfo Graziani, since many men were needed for the war and women became necessary to assist them and to replace them in the many non-front-line roles.

On 18 April 1944, the Female Auxiliary Service was established under Fondelli's leadership. The auxiliaries initially provided only nursing assistance in military hospitals, work in offices and propaganda, and set up mobile refreshment places for the troops. In the space of twelve months 6,000 young women participate in six training courses, in Venice and Como; only then were they assigned to the Commands. After 25 April 1945, the Female Auxiliary Service was dissolved and Pavolini suggested destroying all documentation to avoid reprisals against members.

== Bibliography ==
- Luciano Garibaldi, Le soldatesse di Mussolini. Con il memoriale inedito di Piera Gatteschi Fondelli, Mursia, 1997 ISBN 9788842522423
- Marino Viganò, Donne in grigioverde: il Comando generale del Servizio ausiliario femminile della Repubblica sociale italiana, Settimo Sigillo, 1995
- Ulderico Munzi, Donne di Salò, Sperling, 2004
