= Paolo Zerbino =

Italian politician

Minister of the Interior of the Italian Social Republic
- In office 21 February 1945 – 25 April 1945
- Preceded by: Guido Buffarini Guidi
- Succeeded by: office abolished
- Prefect of Split
- In office 7 June 1941 – 5 August 1943
- Preceded by: office created
- Succeeded by: Giuseppe Grimaldi

Prefect of Turin
- In office 30 September 1943 – 7 May 1944

Extraordinary Commissioner for Piedmont
- In office 21 September 1944 – 21 February 1945

Personal details
- Born: 21 June 1905 Carpeneto, Kingdom of Italy
- Died: 28 April 1945 (aged 39) Dongo, Italy
- Party: National Fascist Party; Republican Fascist Party

Paolo Zerbino (21 June 1905 – 28 April 1945) was an Italian Fascist politician, prefect of Split and Turin during World War II and Minister of the Interior of the Italian Social Republic.

== Biography ==
The son of Sebastiano Zerbino and Emilia Traverso, he joined the Fascist movement at a very young age, while studying law at the University of Pisa. After completing his studies, he moved to Tripolitania, where he was manager in several companies.

He held the posts of federal secretary of the Fascist Party in Vercelli from November 28, 1935 to February 27, 1940, and in Alessandria from February 28, 1940 to June 14, 1941. After the promulgation of the Italian racial laws in 1938, he led the persecution of Jews in the province of Vercelli.

In June 1941, after the Axis invasion of Yugoslavia and the establishment of the Governatorate of Dalmatia, he was appointed prefect of the new province of Spalato, a post he held for over two years. In a report issued in December 1941, he stated that Italian occupation policies had exacerbated the hatred of the Croat population towards Italy and Fascism, and suggested the expulsion of the entire population as the only solution.

In September 1943, after the Armistice of Cassibile and the establishment of the Italian Social Republic, he joined the Republican Fascist Party (PFR), becoming special commissioner of the PFR at the Federation of Rome. On 30 September 1943 he was appointed head of the Province of Turin, officially taking office on 21 October 1943. On 7 May 1944 he was appointed Undersecretary of the Interior of the Italian Social Republic, and on 21 September 1944 he was also appointed extraordinary commissioner for Piedmont; in this capacity, he led the crackdown on the Italian Resistance in Piedmont and especially the repression of the partisan republic of Alba in November 1944. He left the post of undersecretary on February 21, 1945, when he assumed the post of Minister of the Interior in place of Guido Buffarini Guidi.

In late April 1945 he was captured by the partisans while trying to flee to Switzerland along with other members of the government of the Italian Social Republic, and was shot in Dongo, Lombardy on April 28, 1945.
