= Edoardo Moroni =

Italian Fascist politician (1902–1975)

Minister of Agriculture and Forests of the Italian Social Republic
- In office 23 September 1943 – 25 April 1945
- Preceded by: office created
- Succeeded by: office abolished

Member of the Chamber of Fasces and Corporations of the Kingdom of Italy
- In office 23 March 1939 – 5 August 1943

Personal details
- Born: 13 October 1902 Córdoba, Argentina
- Died: 3 February 1975 (aged 72) Buenos Aires, Argentina
- Party: National Fascist Party; Republican Fascist Party

Enrico Odoardo Moroni, better known as Edoardo Moroni (Córdoba, 13 October 1902 – Buenos Aires, 3 February 1975), was an Italian Fascist politician, who served as Minister of Agriculture and Forests of the Italian Social Republic.

== Biography ==
Born in Argentina, he spent his youth in Lucca, where his family had moved. On 15 April 1922 he married Marianna Giorgi, three years older than him, who gave him three children, Maria Paola, Giorgio and Maria Laura, and he later graduated in agriculture at the University of Pisa. An early member of the fascist movement of the first hour, he participated in the march on Rome, and during the Fascist period he held the office of President of the Italian Federation of Agricultural Consortiums in Rome. In 1939 he became a member of the Chamber of Fasces and Corporations.

After the armistice of Cassibile he joined the Italian Social Republic, of which he was Minister of Agriculture and Forestry, with seat initially in Treviso but later moved to San Pellegrino Terme after the heavy Allied air raids on Treviso. In April 1945, with the collapse of the Italian Social Republic, he was sheltered in Luino at the home of the director general of his Ministry, Paolo Albertario (who later turned out to be a member of the CLNAI), and from there he later moved to Livorno and then to Rome, from where he fled to South America. He first stayed in Argentina (where he obtained citizenship as he had been born there), where he worked as an official of the Peron government (devising a plan of agricultural colonization which entailed the immigration of thousands of farmers from Italy, and helping to establish FIAT and Techint plants in Argentina), and later in Brazil, before moving back to Argentina, where he settled permanently. He died in Buenos Aires in 1975.
