= Piero Pisenti =

Italian journalist (1887–1980)

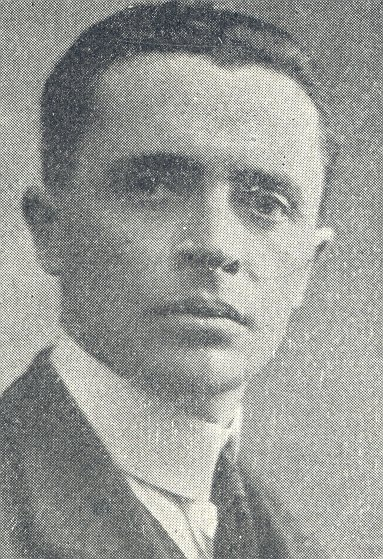

Minister of Justice of the Italian Social Republic
- In office November 1943 – April 1945
- Preceded by: Antonino Tringali Casanuova

Member of the Chamber of Deputies
- In office 24 May 1924 – 2 March 1939

Personal details
- Born: March 20, 1887 Perugia, Kingdom of Italy
- Died: September 29, 1980 (aged 93) Pordenone, Italy
- Party: National Fascist Party
- Education: University of Bologna
- Occupation: Lawyer, politician, journalist, writer
- Known for: Serving as Minister of Justice during the Italian Social Republic and his involvement in the Verona trial

Piero Pisenti (March 20, 1887 – September 29, 1980) was an Italian Fascist journalist and politician.

Pisenti was born in Perugia, Umbria, to a family of university professors. In 1912 he graduated in jurisprudence at the University of Bologna. The following year he moved to Pordenone, Friuli, where he began his political career as a member of the town council, which he held from 1915 to 1919, elected on conservative list. In 1920 he founded in Pordenone the far right party Unione del Lavoro (Labour Union), which was later absorbed into the National Fascist Party (PNF).

He entered the PNF in 1921, and soon became a captain of the Blackshirts in Friuli, as well as a national-level figure of Fascism, and editor of Giornale del Friuli.

In 1926 Pisenti was expelled from the PNF, as he disagreed on some internal regulations of the party. The following year, however, he was readmitted into high office, becoming one of Benito Mussolini's closest collaborators (Mussolini described him as "the man who, throughout twenty years of Fascism, has had the bravery of his very own brilliant heterodoxy"). In 1924 he was elected as to the Italian Chamber of Deputies, a position he held without interruptions until 1939.

After the armistice of September 8, 1943, he remained loyal to Mussolini, and joined the leadership of the Italian Social Republic - in November of that year, he was appointed its Minister of Justice. His predecessor had initiated a "show" trail of Grand Council members who moved against Mussolini. While he opposed this tactic and attempted to free the prisoners, he gave into pressure and refused to pardon the former Fascist leaders who had organized the fall of Mussolini in 1943 (including Galeazzo Ciano, Emilio De Bono and Carlo Pareschi), and who were sentenced to death in the Verona trial.

After the end of World War II, Pisenti was arrested and jailed for a year. After the sentence was carried out, he returned to Pordenone and worked as a lawyer. In 1977 he wrote the controversial essay RSI - Una Repubblica necessaria ("The RSI [Italian Social Republic] - A Necessary Republic"), in which he defended the politics of the Republic.

Pisenti died in Pordenone in 1980.
