= Female Auxiliary Service =

Female Auxiliary Service (SAF)
- SAF Badge
- Founded: 18 April 1944
- Country: Italian Social Republic
- Branch: National Republican Army
- Type: Auxiliary
- Size: 6,000

Commanders
- Generale di brigata: Piera Gatteschi Fondelli

The Female Voluntary Corps for Auxiliary Services of the Republican Armed Forces (Italian: Corpo Femminile Volontario per i Servizi Ausiliari delle Forze Armate Repubblicane, better known as the Female Auxiliary Service (Italian: Servizio Ausiliario Femminile SAF ) was a women's corps of the armed forces of the Italian Social Republic, whose components, all voluntary, were commonly referred to as auxiliaries.

== History ==
On 18 April 1944, the Female Auxiliary Service was established, under the command of fascist of the first hour Piera Gatteschi Fondelli. The auxiliaries initially provided only nursing assistance in military hospitals, work in offices and propaganda, and set up mobile refreshment places for the troops. In the space of twelve months 6,000 young women participate in six training courses, in Venice and Como; only then were they assigned to the Commands. After April 25, 1945 the Female Auxiliary Service was dissolved and Pavolini suggested destroying all documentation to avoid reprisals against members.

== Organisation ==
Only women from the ages of 18 to 45 were allowed to join the ranks of the Female Auxiliary Service. Salaries consisted of 700 Italian lire for higher ups and 350 lire for recruits. Any woman enrolled in this service was subject to military penal jurisdiction.

The Auxiliary Service was split up under three different army corps:

- the silver foxes, a special service composed only of women tasked with espionage, often behind enemy lines in Allied-occupied Italy
- the Black Brigades
- the Decima Flottiglia MAS

The service itself was not allowed to be armed, but the women were trained in firearms combat nonetheless, and in the Black Brigades as well as in the Decima Flottiglia MAS members of the service took part in armed operations.

== See also ==
- Italian Campaign (World War II)
- Italian Co-Belligerent Army
- Military history of Italy during World War II
- Royal Italian Army
- Women in the military
