= Ruggero Romano =

Italian Fascist politician (1895–1945)

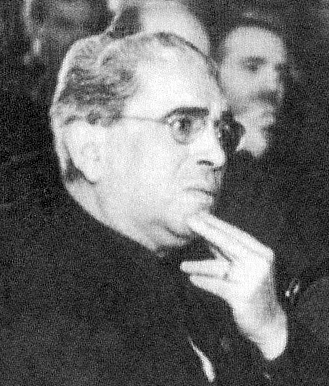
- Romano at the Congress of Verona in November 1943

Minister of Public Works of the Italian Social Republic
- In office 23 September 1943 – 25 April 1945
- Preceded by: office created
- Succeeded by: office abolished
- Undersecretary of State for Communications of the Kingdom of Italy
- In office 20 July 1932 – 23 January 1935

Personal details
- Born: 9 March 1895 Noto, Kingdom of Italy
- Died: 28 April 1945 (aged 50) Dongo, Italy
- Party: National Fascist Party; Republican Fascist Party

Military service
- Allegiance: Kingdom of Italy
- Branch/service: Royal Italian Army
- Rank: Second Lieutenant
- Battles/wars: World War I; Battles of the Isonzo
- Awards: Silver Medal of Military Valor; War Cross for Military Valor; Croix de guerre

Ruggero Romano (9 March 1895 – 28 April 1945) was an Italian Fascist politician, Minister of Public Works of the Italian Social Republic.

== Biography ==
Born in Sicily, he studied law in Catania. After taking an active part in the interventionist campaign, he participated in the First World War as an infantry officer, together with four of his brothers, and earned a Silver Medal of Military Valor for his behaviour during the fighting near Selz and Monfalcone in 1916, as well as the War Cross for Military Valor and the Belgian Croix de guerre. He was seriously wounded and declared a war invalid; in the later part of the war he devoted himself to organizations that provided assistance to the war maimed, in Rome and in Sicily. In March 1919 he published a technical-juridical volume about war pensions.

In 1922, shortly after graduating in law, he joined the National Fascist Party. In July 1924, after the murder of Giacomo Matteotti, he asked Mussolini for a more active role in the ranks of Fascism. During the Fascist regime he continued to work as a lawyer while also holding a number of political posts; he was a member of the Chamber of Deputies in the XXVII, XXVIII and XXIX Legislatures and then a member of the Chamber of Fasces and Corporations during the XXX Legislature. He was called to be part of various study commissions appointed by the government and was co-speaker of the ministerial commission for the reform and codification of war pensions, preparing a first draft of 123 articles, which, after being reviewed by Arturo Rocco (undersecretary of state for war pensions), became law on 12 July 1923. From 1932 to 1935 he was deputy Undersecretary of State for Communications, and during the 1930s he served as secretary of the Acireale section of National Fascist Party and Podestà (mayor) of his hometown, Noto.

After the Armistice of Cassibile of September 1943 he joined the Italian Social Republic and was appointed Minister of Public Works. In April 1945 he followed Benito Mussolini in his attempt to reach Valtellina, but he was captured by the partisans in Dongo and shot on 28 April on the shore of Lake Como, along with other Fascist leaders and officials. His body was among those hanged in Piazzale Loreto in Milan and was later buried for a few years in the Cimitero Maggiore, before being returned to his hometown.
