= Domenico Pellegrini Giampietro =

Italian economist, lawyer, politician, journalist

Domenico Pellegrini Giampietro (August 30, 1899, in Brienza, in Basilicata – June 18, 1970, in Montevideo) was an Italian academic, economist, lawyer, politician, and (in his final years) journalist.

As a young man living in Caserta, Pellegrini Giampietro founded a nationalist legion named Sempre pronti ("Always Ready"). He was a decorated infantry lieutenant in World War I and joined the Fascist movement in 1922, as a member of the Benito Mussolini's Partito Nazionale Fascista (PNF) and took part in the March on Rome. In the period, Pellegrini Giampietro became associated with certain clubs of the Freemasonry.

A major figure of Campanian-elected fascists (together with Alfredo Rocco, Bruno Spampanato, and the economist Alberto Beneduce), he received a diploma in Law in 1926, and became a lawyer for the next eight years. He was one who took Fascism into academia, lecturing on Comparative public law and doctrinary history of Fascism at Naples University. He also worked in several credit unions.

Pellegrini Giampietro was a volunteer infantry captain on Francisco Franco's side in the Spanish Civil War and was twice decorated. Upon his return, he received numerous political appointments – notably, he was a counsellor for the Corporazioni and the Fasci, and deputy-secretary in the Ministry of Finance in 1943.

He joined Mussolini in Northern Italy after the latter's ousting and Italy's commitment to the Allies in World War II, becoming an official of the Nazi German-controlled Italian Social Republic (the "republic of Salò"). As finance minister, he also set up, in 1944, its infamous Brigate Nera paramilitary force. At the end of the war Pellegrini Giampietro was arrested and charged with collaborating with the enemy. On 28 August 1945 he was sentenced to thirty-year imprisonment for crimes against the State. He escaped from the prison and in 1949, he took refuge in Brazil, then Argentina, and finally Uruguay. He kept on working as a banker and edited the magazine Sintesi.

Domenico Pellegrini Giampietro wrote on the theory of Fascism: his 1941 volume Aspetti spirituali del fascismo ("Spiritual Aspects of Fascism") dealt with the more mystical qualities of the dogma, while L'oro di Salò ("The Gold of Salò") attempted to explain his actions as planner for the Republic's economy (notably, in early 1945 he had printed only 10,881 million although the print of 137,840 million had been authorized), as well as launching accusations at people who would have been responsible for plundering the wealth amassed by Mussolini's government.
