= Silvio Gai =

Italian Fascist politician

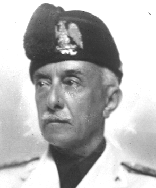

Minister of Corporative Economy of the Italian Social Republic
- In office 23 September 1943 – 31 December 1943
- Preceded by: office created
- Succeeded by: Angelo Tarchi
- State Undersecretary of the Ministry of Labour of the Kingdom of Italy
- In office 31 October 1922 – 27 April 1923
- Member of the Chamber of Deputies of the Kingdom of Italy
- In office 11 June 1921 – 21 January 1929
- Member of the Senate of the Kingdom of Italy
- In office 17 April 1939 – 5 August 1943

Personal details
- Born: 5 August 1873 Rome, Italy
- Died: 1 November 1967 (aged 94) Livorno, Italy
- Party: National Fascist Party; Republican Fascist Party

Silvio Maria Giuseppe Francesco Gai (5 August 1873 in Rome – 1 November 1967 in Livorno) was an Italian Fascist politician, Senator and Deputy of the Kingdom of Italy during the interwar period and Minister of Corporative Economy of the Italian Social Republic from September to December 1943.

== Biography ==
The second son of painter Francesco Gai, during his youth he set up a workshop in Rome for the construction of electrostatic devices for medical use, but the company went bankrupt, forcing him to move to Genoa, where he worked in an electric motor factory and later in the merchant navy. He then moved again to Isola della Scala, where he worked in a power plant; having thus gained a good knowledge on the subject, he became a designer and builder of electric motors at industrial plants and, finally, at the Orlando shipyard in Livorno. In 1908 he was hired as general director of the "Aziende Industriali Elettriche", an electrical company, and he later became one of the founders of the Marche Electricity Company, which developed the electrical network of the Marche (the company was later involved in the bankruptcy of the Banca Italiana di Sconto, and was absorbed by the Unione Servizi Electrici of Milan).

In 1920, after the First World War, Gai joined the nascent Fascist movement and quickly became its leader in the Marche, where he established the first "action squads" and became regional secretary of the Italian Fasces of Combat. In 1921 he was elected to the Italian Chamber of Deputies with the National Fascist Party, and after the March on Rome he became part of the Mussolini Cabinet as undersecretary of the Ministry of Labor, until April 1923. He was re-elected deputy in 1924, and received the rank of luogotenente generale in the Volunteer Militia for National Security. At the same time, he continued to hold various positions in large power companies, and became interested in oil, writing several books on the subject.

Taking into account the experience of the Spanish Civil War, in which he had participated, he designed large underground fuel tanks, sheltered from air attacks, and proposed a plan for their construction in strategic points all over the Italian territory and its colonies which, which accepted by the government but only partially implemented. Having realized the importance for the national economy of the exploitation of the natural gas (methane) fields existing in Emilia and in the Po Valley, he promoted studies on the matter and proposed, in 1940, to set up a specific body to coordinate the production and exploitation of methane: the Ente Nazionale Metano (National Methane Body), of which he was appointed president. In April 1939 he was appointed Senator of the Kingdom.

After the armistice of Cassibile on 8 September 1943, Gai remained in northern Italy and joined the Italian Social Republic on 29 September 1943, being appointed Minister for Corporate Economy, from which however he resigned in December 1943, opposing German plans to transfer workers and machinery from Italian companies to Germany, as well the socialization of the economy supported by part of the PFR. He was appointed president of the Methane and Carbon Fuel Body.

After the end of the war, on 31 July 1945, Gai was removed from the position of senator by the High Court of Justice for Sanctions against Fascism. After losing all institutional roles, he devoted himself to a new economic initiative, seeking to exploit urban waste to obtain recyclable materials and organic fertilizers; pilot plants were built in Viterbo and Cagliari, but the initiative failed to take off due to the lack of interest in the market, still far from the idea that waste could have some use and be an industrially exploitable material. He spent his last years in the Livorno neighborhood of Antignano.
