= Angelo Tarchi (politician) =

Italian Fascist politician (1897–1974)

Minister of Corporative Economy of the Italian Social Republic
- In office 1 January 1944 – 19 January 1945
- Preceded by: Silvio Gai
- Succeeded by: office abolished

Minister of Labor and Industrial Production of the Italian Social Republic
- In office 19 January 1945 – 25 April 1945
- Preceded by: office created
- Succeeded by: office abolished
- Member of the Chamber of Deputies of the Kingdom of Italy
- In office 28 April 1934 – 2 March 1939

Member of the Chamber of Fasces and Corporations of the Kingdom of Italy
- In office 23 March 1939 – 5 August 1943

Personal details
- Born: 5 February 1897 Borgo San Lorenzo, Kingdom of Italy
- Died: 11 February 1974 (aged 77) Milan, Italy
- Party: Italian Fasces of Combat; National Fascist Party; Republican Fascist Party; Italian Social Movement

Military service
- Allegiance: Kingdom of Italy
- Branch/service: Royal Italian Army
- Rank: Major
- Battles/wars: World War I; Battles of the Isonzo; Battle of Caporetto; World War II; Greco-Italian War
- Awards: Bronze Medal of Military Valor (twice)

Angelo Tarchi (Borgo San Lorenzo, 5 February 1897 – Milan, 16 February 1974) was an Italian Fascist politician, Minister of Corporative Economy of the Italian Social Republic. He was the grand-uncle of Marco Tarchi.

== Biography ==
He fought as a volunteer in the First World War, reaching the rank of captain in the Arditi and earning a Bronze Medal of Military Valor. At the end of the war he joined the Italian Fasces of Combat, and later the National Fascist Party. Holder of a degree in chemistry, he was a member of scientific academies and held executive positions in chemical companies. In 1934 he was elected to the Italian Chamber of Deputies, and in 1939 he became a member of the Chamber of Fasces and Corporations.

In 1940 he volunteered for the Greco-Italian War, commanding a battalion of the 83rd Infantry Regiment with the rank of major (later promoted to lieutenant colonel) and receiving another Bronze Medal. On 26 December 1941 he was appointed National Inspector of the National Fascist Party. On 28 August 1943, after the fall of the Fascist regime, he was recalled into Army service and given command of a battalion of the 215th Coastal Division, which he disbanded after the armistice of Cassibile of 8 September 1943. He then joined the Italian Social Republic, collaborating in the drafting of the decree on the socialization of the economy, and was one of the proponents of the Verona Manifesto. From 1 January 1944 he succeeded Silvio Gai as Minister of Corporative Economy. On 19 January 1945 this ministry was suppressed and renamed Ministry of Labor and Industrial Production, still headed by Tarchi.

On 26 April 1945, as the Italian Social Republic collapsed with the Allies advancing beyond the Po and the partisans taking control of the major northern Italian cities, Tarchi tried to flee to Switzerland along with Guido Buffarini Guidi, former Minister of the Interior of the Italian Social Republic (in the previous days, Tarchi and Buffarini Guidi had tried to persuade Mussolini to cross the Swiss border), but they were arrested near Porlezza by the Guardia di Finanza, which had placed itself at the orders of the National Liberation Committee. He was subsequently tried for his role in the Fascist regime, but amnestied in 1948.

He then returned to work in the chemical industry and directed the magazine Chimica. He also became President of the Italian-Brazilian Chamber of Commerce. In the 1960s, he was elected city councilor of Milan with the Italian Social Movement, and in 1967 he published a book of political reflections, entitled Teste dure. He died in Milan in 1974.
