= Antonino Tringali Casanuova =

Italian politician

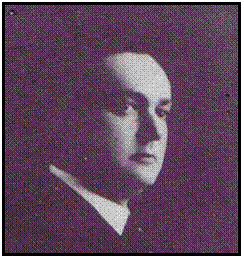
Antonino Tringali Casanuova

Antonino Tringali Casanuova (11 April 1888 – 30 October 1943) was an Italian politician who served under Benito Mussolini in the Italian Social Republic.

Tringali-Casanova was born in Cecina, Province of Livorno, Tuscany.

His first government assignment was vice-president for Special Tribunal for the State Defence (Italian: Tribunale Speciale per la Sicurezza dello Stato) from September 1928 until November 1932. He then served as president from November 1932 until July 1943. He was a fascist hardliner, and on 24 July 1943, as member of the Gran Consiglio del Fascismo, he voted against the Ordine del Giorno Grandi, joining Mussolini's side.

In September 1943 he was appointed Italian Social Republic's first Minister of Justice. On 30 October 1943 he died as a result of angina pectoris and was replaced as Minister of Justice by Piero Pisenti.
