= Maria Rygier =

Italian revolutionary journalist (1885–1953)

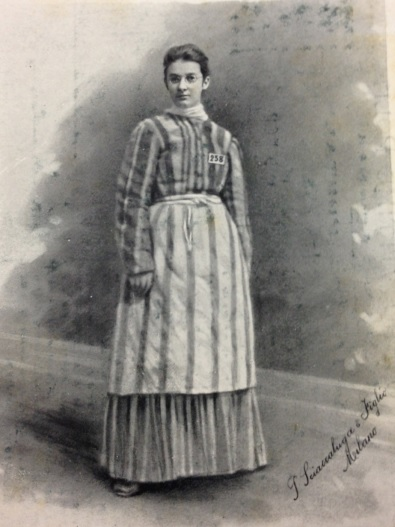

Maria Rygier (born 1885 in Kraków, died 1953 in Rome) was an Italian journalist and politician. She was at times in her life an anarchist propagandist, a revolutionary syndicalist, an anti-militarist, an ardent pro-war militant, an early supporter of the fascist movement in Italy, an anti-fascist, and a monarchist.

== Biography ==
Rygier was a follower of Arturo Labriola and the socialist avant-garde in Italy. In 1907 she became editor of the newspaper Lotta di classe, a socialist revolutionary publication. With Filippo Corridoni, she also founded the anti-militarist broadsheet Rompete le file. She voiced the opinion that women should oppose militarism, as they gave birth to the soldiers killed in war on behalf of the state. In 1908, she was sentenced to prison for publishing an article endorsing regicide in Rompete le file.

In 1909, she began to support anarchism in Italy. She became active in contributing to La Demolizione of the syndicalist Ottavio Dinale from 1907 to 1911. She was sentenced to prison again in 1912 for writing an article in defense of an anarchist soldier, Augusto Masetti, who had shot an officer during the Italian invasion of Libya in 1911. The article appeared in the anarchist journal she co-edited in Bologna, L'Agitatore.

Though she had been a fervent anti-militarist even in 1912, two years later she was just as fervent a World War I interventionist. In 1914, she became an editor at the newspaper founded by Benito Mussolini, Il Popolo d'Italia. The fascist daily was devoted to supporting the campaign for intervention by Italy in the War. As a syndicalist and union supporter, she was jailed for a period in 1914. Her status as a political prisoner fighting for syndicalism became known to Italian-American syndicalists during the period. Anarchist Leda Rafanelli urged Italian workers to follow the example of Rygier.

After a brief nationalist period, she fled to France in 1926, by then in open opposition to Fascism. While in France, Rygier published a pamphlet highly critical of Mussolini. The 16-page pamphlet was originally written in French. The pamphlet was translated and published worldwide in 1928, revealing how Rygier became disillusioned with Mussolini, accusing him of being an informer, engaging in blackmail, and of using tactics harmful to Italy's national interests yet beneficial to its future allies. She further accused Mussolini of political opportunism to further his personal interests, such as taking a lucrative newspaper job that required switching political orientation:

...I have already explained, in the French press, that being a fervent interventionist myself, I had been, to some extent, responsible for the "conversion" of Mussolini due to the advice I gave the French Ambassador at the Quirinal, M. Barrère, to start a daily socialist paper devoted to the interests of the Allies at Milan, an important industrial center and therefore proletariat. My suggestion was well received by France and carried out to the letter with the exception, however, of the selection of the future manager of the paper. Not having then the least idea that Mussolini was for sale I had not suggested his name to M. Barrère. I had suggested the name of a well-known syndicalist already favorable to the cause of intervention. [...] when I learned that France had succeeded in hiring [...] the flag-bearer of neutrality, I conceived a real admiration for that French diplomacy which had realized that powerful trick of discovering Mussolini, or rather of discovering an impetuous interventionist under the mask of an "absolute neutral".

Little is known of Rygier's activities after the publication of her anti-Fascist pamphlet in France and the end of World War II. She returned to Italy after the end of World War II. In 1946, she wrote a polemic book on the exiled anti-Fascists (Rivelazioni sul fuoruscitismo italiano in Francia, Rome, 1946). She eventually became a supporter of the monarchy of Italy. She died in Rome in 1953.

== Bibliography ==
- Sulla soglia di un'epoca. La nostra Patria, Rome, 1915.
- Rivelazioni sul fuoruscitismo italiano in Francia, Rome, 1946.
