= Augusto Liverani =

Italian politician

Minister of Communications of the Italian Social Republic
- In office 5 October 1943 – 25 April 1945
- Preceded by: Gaetano Polverelli
- Succeeded by: office abolished

Personal details
- Born: 7 August 1895 Senigallia, Kingdom of Italy
- Died: 28 April 1945 (aged 49) Dongo, Italy
- Party: National Fascist Party; Republican Fascist Party

Military service
- Allegiance: Kingdom of Italy
- Branch/service: Royal Italian Army
- Years of service: 1915-1918
- Unit: 5th Bersaglieri Regiment
- Battles/wars: World War I

Augusto Liverani, also known as Agostino Liverani (7 August 1895 – 28 April 1945) was an Italian Fascist politician, Minister of Communications of the Italian Social Republic.

== Biography ==
He participated in the First World War as an officer of the 5th Bersaglieri Regiment, and was wounded in action and mutilated. After joining the National Fascist Party, he served as president of the province of Novara and, during the Second World War, as secretary of the Milan Industry Employees Union. In 1939 he became a member of the Chamber of Fasces and Corporations.

He was married to Brunilla Fusilli and had two children, Riccardo and Elena. Filmmaker Maurizio Liverani, who in the final part of the war fought in the Italian Resistance, was his nephew.

He became Minister of Communications of the Italian Social Republic on 5 October 1943, following the renunciation of Gaetano Polverelli. At the end of the war, on 28 April 1945, he was captured with the Duce by the partisans and shot in Dongo. His body was hung in piazzale Loreto in Milan. He was initially buried in the Cimitero Maggiore of Milan, and later moved to his native Senigallia.
