= Giuseppe Spinelli (politician) =

Italian politician (1908–1987)

Giuseppe Spinelli (21 November 1908 – 17 January 1987) was an Italian politician in Fascist Italy from 1943 to 1945, when he fled to Argentina with many of his compatriots.

== Career ==
In his youth he was a worker in a printing company in his hometown of Cremona. In 1943, he became provincial secretary of the Fascist Corporation of Industrial Workers. On 13 September 1944 he was appointed mayor of Milan by Benito Mussolini, a position he would hold until 24 January 1945.

During his tenure as mayor, he was called upon to lead the "Ministry of Labor of the Italian Social Republic". As Minister, he supported laws promulgating socialization of the economy (See Congress of Verona (1943)). This push was largely opposed by both Italian capitalists, as well as Nazi Germany.

After the fall of the Italian Social Republic he fled to Argentina, where he resumed his original job as a typographer. In 1953, he began leading The Confederation of Italian Federations in Argentina, an organization founded in 1912 that worked to organize a variety of pro-Italian organizations in Argentina.

He later collaborated with then President of Argentina Juan Perón, who appointed him head of the Immigration Department of the Argentine Navy. He also advised Perón on economic matters such as socialism and corporatism. After Perón's fall in 1955, he fled to Mexico before later returning to his hometown in Italy.

He died in his hometown on 17 January 1987.

Preceded by Guido Andreoni	Podestà of Milan; 1944–1945	Succeeded by Mario Colombo
