= Marco Tarchi =

Italian political scientist (born 1952)

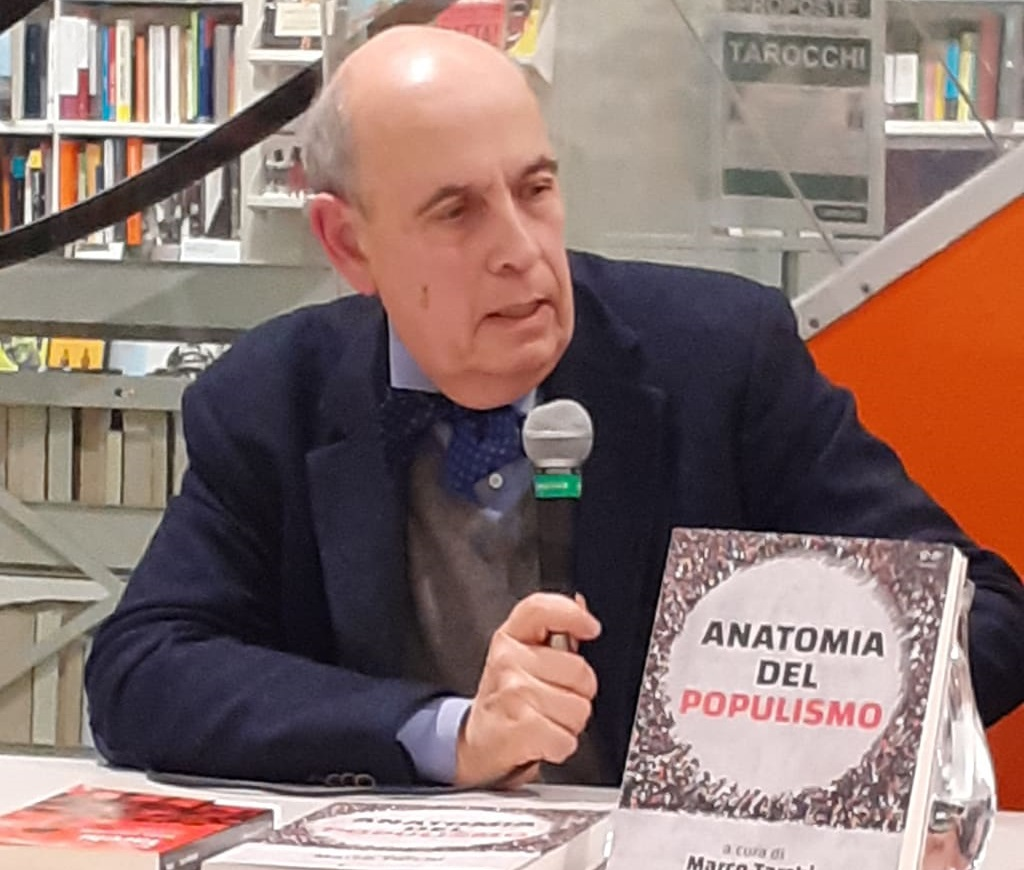
Tarchi during the presentation of "Anatomia del Populismo" at the "Libraccio" bookshop in Florence

Marco Tarchi (born 11 October 1952 in Rome) is an Italian political scientist. He is currently full professor of Political Science, Political Theory and Political Communication at the Cesare Alfieri School of Political Sciences of the University of Florence. His research is focused primarily on populism, democracy, political organization, and the extreme right.

He obtained his Ph.D. in Political Science at the University of Florence in 1987. In the same university, he was an assistant professor with tenure in Political Science from 1993 to 1998 and then an associate professor from 1998 to 2001. He has been a full professor since 2001. He was also a visiting professor at the universities of Turku (1993, 1996–1998, 2003, 2007), Santiago and Viña del Mar (2004), and del Rosario (2008).

== Bibliography ==
- Partito unico e dinamica autoritaria, Naples: Akropolis, 1981
- La "rivoluzione legale", Bologna: Il Mulino, 1993
- "Destra e sinistra: due essenze introvabili", in Democrazia e diritto, 1, 1994, pp. 381–396
- Cinquant'anni di nostalgia. La destra italiana dopo il fascismo. Milan: Rizzoli, 1995 (interview of Antonio Carioti)
- Esuli in patria. I fascisti nell'Italia repubblicana. Parma: Guanda, 1995
- The Dissatisfied Society. The Roots of Political Change in Italy, in European Journal of Political Research, 1, 1996, pp. 41–63
- Italy: the Northern League, in L. de Winter and H. Türsan (eds), Regionalist Parties in Western Europe. London: Routledge, 1998
- Estrema destra e neopopulismo in Europa, in Rivista Italiana di Scienza Politica, 2, 1998
- Italy: Early Crisis and Collapse, in D. Berg-Schlosser and J. Mitchell (eds), Conditions of Democracy in Europe, 1918–1938. London: Macmillan, 2000.
- L' Italia populista. Dal qualunquismo ai girotondi, il Mulino, 2003, ISBN 9788815094421
- Il fascismo. Teorie, interpretazioni, modelli, Bari: Laterza, 2003
- Contro l'americanismo, Laterza Bari: Laterza, 2004
- La rivoluzione impossibile. Dai Campi Hobbit alla nuova Destra, Florence: Vallecchi, 2010
- Italia populista. Dal qualunquismo a Beppe Grillo, Bologna: Il Mulino, 2014
