= Italian Social Republic =

Puppet state of Nazi Germany (1943–1945)

National Republican State of Italy (1943) Stato Nazionale Repubblicano d'Italia Italian Social Republic (1943–1945) Repubblica Sociale Italiana
- 1943–1945
- Flag Coat of arms
- Motto: Per l'onore d'Italia "For the honour of Italy"
- Anthem: "Il Canto degli Italiani" (de facto) (Note: In ceremonies, either Il Canto degli Italiani or Giovinezza was sung (in the latter case the legionaries preferred the text of the "Hymn of the Arditi" rather than that of the "Triumphal Hymn of the National Fascist Party"). Marcia del Volontario by Ennio Porrino was endorsed by Undersecretary to the Presidency of the Council of Ministers, Francesco Maria Barracu, but never became official.) ("The Song of the Italians") "Giovinezza" (de facto) ("Youth")
- Location of the Italian Social Republic within Europe in 1943 Territory nominally administered by the RSI German Operational Zones (OZAV, OZAK) (Note: Both OZAV and OZAK were still formally part of the RSI. But the two regions were put under direct German military administration.)

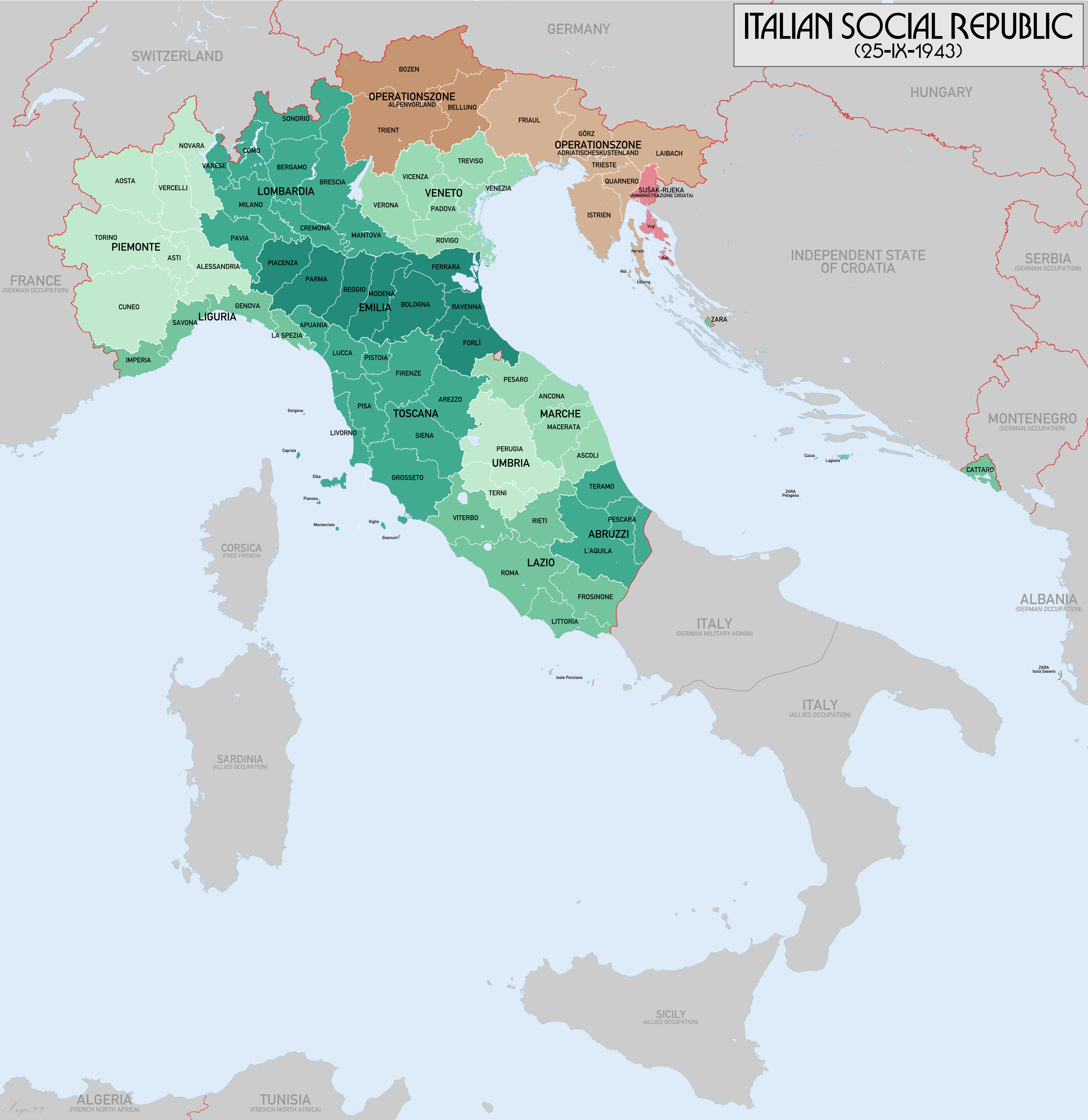
- Administrative divisions of the Italian Social Republic
- Status: Puppet state of Germany; Rump regime of Fascist Italy
- Capital: Salò, Verona, and Milan (de facto); Rome (de jure)
- Largest city: Rome
- Official languages: Italian
- Minority languages: Lombard; Emilian; Venetian; Romagnol; Ligurian; Piedmontese; German; Neapolitan; Franco-Provençal; and others
- Religion: Catholicism
- Demonym: Italian
- Government: Unitary fascist state
- Duce
  - 1943–1945: Benito Mussolini
- Plenipotentiary
  - 1943–1945: Rudolf Rahn
- Historical era: World War II; Italian Campaign; Italian Civil War
  - Operation Achse: 8–19 September 1943
  - Mussolini's restoration: 23 September 1943
  - Partisan uprising: 25 April 1945
  - Death of Benito Mussolini: 28 April 1945
  - Surrender of RSI forces: 29 April 1945
- Currency: Italian lira
Preceded by	Succeeded by
Kingdom of Italy	Kingdom of Italy; Democratic Federal Yugoslavia
- Today part of: Italy

The Italian Social Republic (Italian: Repubblica Sociale Italiana, IPA: [reˈpubblika soˈtʃaːle itaˈljaːna]; RSI), known prior to December 1943 as the National Republican State of Italy (Stato Nazionale Repubblicano d'Italia; SNRI), and popularly known unofficially as the Republic of Salò (Repubblica di Salò, IPA: [reˈpubblika di saˈlɔ]), was a German puppet state with limited diplomatic recognition that was created during the latter part of World War II.

It was a collaborationist regime in German-occupied Italy, established after the German invasion of Italy in September 1943 and disbanded with the surrender of Axis troops in Italy in May 1945. The German occupation triggered widespread national resistance against it and the Italian Social Republic during the liberation of Italy and the Italian civil war. Meanwhile, the Allied-liberated portion of Italy was informally known as the Kingdom of the South.

The Italian Social Republic was the second and last incarnation of the Italian Fascist state, led by the Italian dictator Benito Mussolini and his reformed Republican Fascist Party. The newly founded state declared Rome its capital but the de facto capital was Salò (hence the colloquial name of the state), a small town on Lake Garda, near Brescia, where Mussolini and the Ministry of Foreign Affairs were headquartered. The Italian Social Republic nominally exercised sovereignty in Northern and Central Italy, but was largely dependent on German troops to maintain control.

In July 1943, after the Allies had pushed Italy out of North Africa and subsequently invaded Sicily, the Grand Council of Fascism—with the support of King Victor Emmanuel III—overthrew and arrested Mussolini. The new government began secret peace negotiations with the Allied powers but when the Armistice of Cassibile was announced on 8 September, Nazi Germany was prepared and quickly intervened. German troops seized control of the northern half of Italy, freed Mussolini, and brought him to the German-occupied area to establish a satellite regime. The Italian Social Republic was proclaimed on 23 September 1943. Although the RSI claimed sovereignty over all of Italy and its colonies, its de facto jurisdiction only extended to a vastly reduced portion of the country. The RSI received diplomatic recognition only from the Axis powers and their satellite states. Finland and Vichy France, although in the German orbit, did not recognize it. Unofficial relations were maintained with Argentina, Portugal, Spain, and, through commercial agents, Switzerland. Vatican City did not recognize the RSI.

Around 25 April 1945, 19 months after its founding, the RSI collapsed. In Italy, the day is known as Liberation Day (festa della liberazione). On that day, a general partisan uprising, alongside the efforts of Allied forces during their final offensive in Italy, managed to oust the Germans and the remaining RSI forces from Italy almost entirely. Mussolini was captured and killed by Italian partisans on 28 April as he and an entourage attempted to flee. The RSI Minister of Defense, Rodolfo Graziani, surrendered what was left of the Italian Social Republic on 1 May, one day after the German forces in Italy capitulated.

== Context of its creation ==
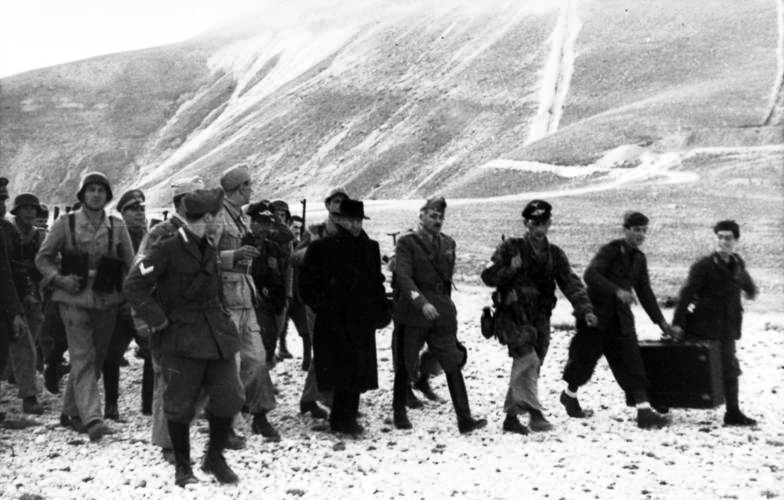
Benito Mussolini rescued by German troops from his prison in Campo Imperatore on 12 September 1943

On 24 July 1943, after the Allied landings in Sicily, on a motion by Dino Grandi, the Grand Council of Fascism voted a motion of no confidence in Prime Minister Benito Mussolini. Mussolini's authority had been undermined by a series of military defeats from the start of Italy's entry into the war during June 1940, including the bombing of Rome, the loss of the African colonies in the East African and North African campaigns, the defeat of the Italian Army in Russia and the Allied invasion of Sicily.

The next day, King Victor Emmanuel III dismissed Mussolini from office, ordered him arrested, and appointed Marshal Pietro Badoglio as new prime minister. By this time, the monarchy, a number of Fascist government members, and the general Italian population had grown tired of the futile war effort which had driven Italy into subordination to and subjugation by Nazi Germany. The failed war effort left Mussolini humiliated at home and abroad as a "sawdust Caesar". The new government began secret negotiations with the Allied powers and made preparations for the capitulation of Italy. These surrender talks implied a commitment from Badoglio to leave the Axis alliance.

While the Germans formally recognised the new status quo in Italian politics, they intervened by sending some of the best units of the Wehrmacht to Italy. This was done both to resist new Allied advances and to face the predictably imminent defection of Italy. While Badoglio continued to swear loyalty to Germany and the Axis powers, Italian government emissaries prepared to sign an armistice at Cassibile in Allied-occupied Sicily, which was finalized on 3 September.

On 8 September, Badoglio announced Italy's armistice with the Allies (although termed an "armistice", its terms made it akin to an unconditional surrender). German Führer Adolf Hitler and his staff, long aware of the negotiations, acted immediately by ordering German troops to seize control of Northern and Central Italy. The Germans quickly occupied Italy, disarmed the Italian troops and took over all of the Italian Army's materials and equipment, meeting only limited resistance. The Italian armed forces were not given clear orders to resist the Germans after the armistice and so resistance to the German takeover was scattered and of little effect. King Victor Emmanuel made no effort to rally resistance to the Germans, instead fleeing with his retinue to the safety of the Allied lines. On 10 September 1943, after two days of battle between the Wehrmacht and the remnants of the Royal Italian Army, Rome fell to the Germans.

The armistice meant that the Germans were forced to take over Italy's occupation zones in France, Greece and Yugoslavia. It also triggered the Dodecanese campaign where Germany and the Allies fought for control of the Italian Islands of the Aegean.

The new Italian government had moved Mussolini from place to place while he was in captivity in an attempt to foil any attempts at rescue. Despite this, the Germans eventually pinpointed Mussolini at the Hotel Campo Imperatore at Gran Sasso. On 12 September, Mussolini was freed by the Germans in Operation Eiche (directed by SS-Obersturmbannführer Otto Skorzeny) in the mountains of Abruzzo. After being freed, Mussolini was flown to Bavaria. Gathering what support he still had among the Italian population, his liberation made it possible for a new German-dependent Fascist Italian state to be created.

== Foreign relations ==
=== Establishment by Nazi Germany ===
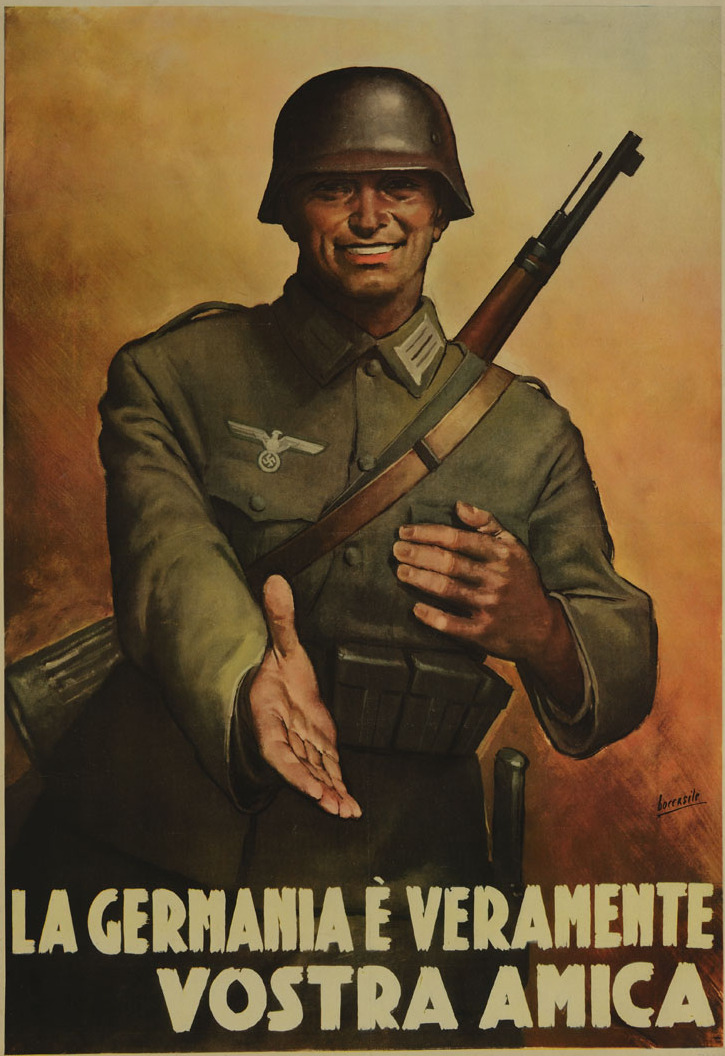
Italian Social Republic propaganda poster saying: "Germany is truly your friend", by Gino Boccasile (1944)

Three days following his rescue in the Gran Sasso raid, Mussolini was taken to Germany for a meeting with Hitler in Rastenburg at his headquarters in East Prussia. While Mussolini was in poor health and wanted to retire, Hitler wanted him to return to Italy and start a new Fascist state under the protection of the Wehrmacht. Mussolini balked; he was tired of the responsibilities of the war and unwilling to retake power. Hitler told him the alternative would be a German military administration that would treat Italy no differently from other occupied countries. Hitler also threatened to destroy Milan, Genoa and Turin unless Mussolini agreed to set up a revived Fascist government. Reluctantly, Mussolini agreed to Hitler's demands.

Mussolini returned to Italy and settled in Milan, from where on 15 September he announced the creation of the Republican Fascist Party and, three days later, the resumption of the war alongside Germany and Japan. The Duce immediately announced the formation of a new republican cabinet, although they actually came from a list chosen and appointed by Hitler himself. The Italian Social Republic was proclaimed on 23 September, with Mussolini as both chief of state and prime minister. The RSI claimed Rome as its capital, but the de facto capital became the small town of Salò on Lake Garda, midway between Milan and Venice, where Mussolini resided along with the foreign office of the RSI. While Rome itself was still under Axis control at the time, given the city's proximity to Allied lines and the threat of civil unrest, neither the Germans nor Mussolini himself wanted him to return to Rome.

On 18 September, Mussolini made his first public address to the Italian people since his rescue, in which he commended the loyalty of Hitler as an ally while condemning Victor Emmanuel for betraying Italian Fascism. He declared: "It is not the regime that has betrayed the monarchy, it is the monarchy that has betrayed the regime". He also formally repudiated his previous support of the monarchy, saying: "When a monarchy fails in its duties, it loses every reason for being...The state we want to establish will be national and social in the highest sense of the word; that is, it will be Fascist, thus returning to our origins".

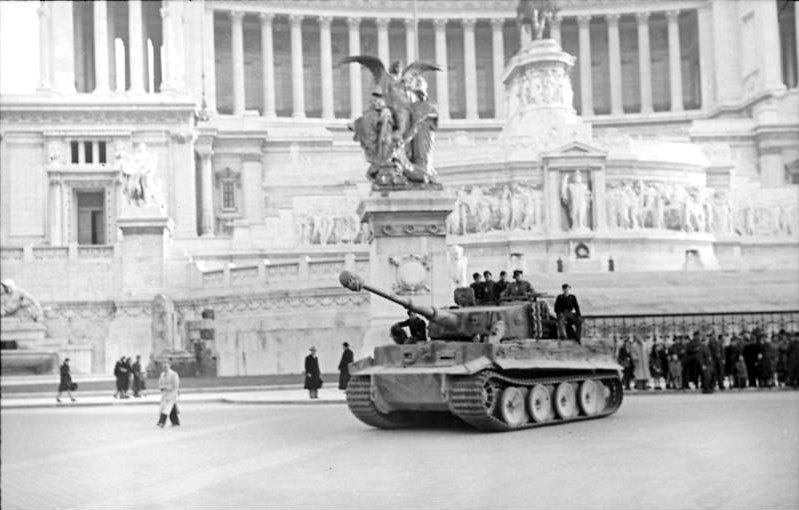
German Tiger I tank in front of the Victor Emmanuel II Monument in Rome in February 1944

From the start, the Italian Social Republic was little more than a puppet state dependent entirely upon Germany and a rump state for the Fascists who were still loyal to Mussolini. Mussolini himself knew this; even as he stated in public that he was in full control of the RSI, he was well aware that he was little more than the Gauleiter of Lombardy. The SS kept Mussolini under what amounted to house arrest; it monitored his communications and controlled his travel. Mussolini later said that he would have preferred being sent to a concentration camp to the manner that the SS treated him. Real power rested with German General Plenipotentiary Rudolf Rahn and SS-Obergruppenführer Karl Wolff, the commander of the German occupying forces in Italy.

The RSI had no constitution or organized economy, and its financing was dependent entirely on funding from Berlin. German forces themselves had little respect for Mussolini's failed fascism, and considered the regime merely as a tool for maintaining order, such as repressing the Italian partisans. This work was also carried out by the infamous Pietro Koch and the Banda Koch on Germany's behalf.

The RSI took revenge against the 19 members who had voted against Mussolini on the Grand Council with the Verona trial (processo di Verona) which handed down a death sentence to all of the accused but one. Only six of the 19 were in RSI custody (Giovanni Marinelli, Carlo Pareschi, Luciano Gottardi, Tullio Cianetti, Emilio De Bono and Mussolini's own son-in-law Galeazzo Ciano). With the exception of Tullio Cianetti, who received a life sentence, they were all executed on 11 January 1944 in the fort of San Procolo in Verona.

=== Territorial losses ===
The changing political and military situation re-opened questions regarding the status of Italian territories, particularly those with German-speaking majorities that were formerly under Austrian rule. Previously, Hitler had vigorously suppressed any campaigning for the return of lands such as South Tyrol in order to maintain good relations with his Italian ally. In the aftermath of Italy's abandonment of the Axis on 8 September 1943, Germany seized and de facto incorporated some Italian territories. However, Hitler refused to officially annex South Tyrol in spite of urging by local German officials and instead supported having the RSI hold official sovereignty over these territories and forbade all measures that would give the impression of official annexation of South Tyrol. However, in practice the territory of South Tyrol within the boundaries defined by Germany as Operationszone Alpenvorland that included Trento, Bolzano and Belluno were de facto incorporated into Germany's Reichsgau Tirol-Vorarlberg and administered by its Gauleiter Franz Hofer. The region identified by Germany as Operationszone Adriatisches Küstenland that included Udine, Gorizia, Trieste, Pola and Fiume were de facto incorporated into Reichsgau Kärnten and administered by its Gauleiter Friedrich Rainer.

On 10 September 1943, the Independent State of Croatia (NDH) declared that the Treaties of Rome of 18 May 1941 with the Kingdom of Italy were null and void and annexed the portion of Dalmatia that had been given to Italy from the partition of Axis-occupied Yugoslavia as part of those treaties. The NDH attempted to annex Zara, which had been a recognized territory of Italy since 1919, but Germany prevented the NDH from doing this. Because of these actions, the RSI held the NDH in contempt and refused to have diplomatic relations with the NDH or to recognize its territorial claims.

After the Italian capitulation, the Italian Islands of the Aegean were occupied by the Germans (see Dodecanese campaign). During the German occupation, the islands remained under the nominal sovereignty of the RSI but were de facto subject to the German military command.

The Italian concession of Tientsin in China was ceded by the RSI to the Japanese puppet Reorganized National Government of the Republic of China.

=== Diplomatic recognition ===
Eagle with fasces, symbol of the Italian Social Republic

The RSI was recognized as the legitimate government of Italy by Germany, Japan, Bulgaria, Romania, Hungary and Thailand; it was also recognised by puppet and client States of the Axis, such as the Independent State of Croatia, the Slovak Republic, the Reorganised National Government of the Republic of China and Manchukuo.

Finland and Vichy France, despite being in the Axis orbit, did not recognise the RSI. Even otherwise sympathetic States such as Spain or Portugal refused to establish formal diplomatic relations with the RSI. The Holy See did not recognise the RSI.

== Economy and war effort ==
War flag of the Italian Social Republic

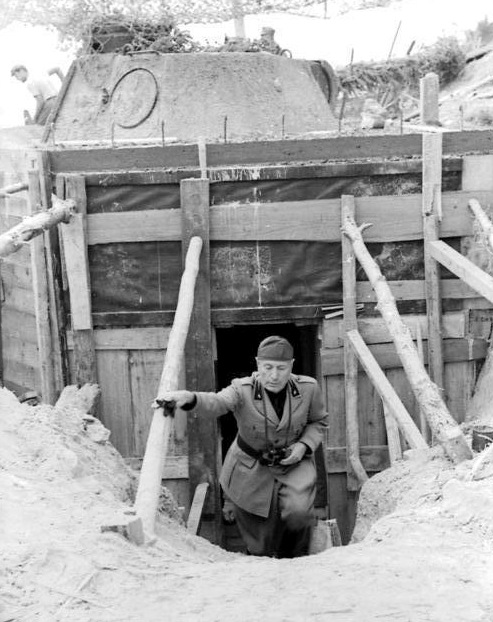
Mussolini inspecting fortified positions, 1944

Territory of the Italian Social Republic throughout its lifespan

During the existence of the Italian Social Republic, Mussolini, whose former government had banned trade unions and strikes, began to make increasingly populist appeals to the working class. He claimed to regret many of the decisions made earlier in supporting the interests of big business and promised a new beginning if the Italian people would be willing to grant him a second chance. Mussolini claimed that he had never totally abandoned his left-wing influences, insisting that he had attempted to nationalize property in 1939–1940 but had been forced to delay such action for tactical reasons related to the war. With the removal of the monarchy, Mussolini claimed the full ideology of Fascism could be pursued; and to gain popular support he reversed over twenty years of Fascist policy of backing private property and relative economic independence by ordering the nationalization of all companies with over 100 employees. Mussolini even reached out to ex-communist Nicola Bombacci to help him in spreading the image that Fascism was a progressive movement. The economic policy of the RSI was given the name "Socialization", and Mussolini had even considered the idea of calling his new republic the "Italian 'Socialist' Republic". In practice, little resulted from the declared socialisation of the economy. Unions did not exert real control of their management and took no part in state planning (as they had the power to do on paper after the socialisation). The Italian industrial sector was excluded from the new reforms by the Germans, and Italian industrialists were opposed to the changes in any case. The Italian labour force (large parts of which had remained leftist despite fascist rule) regarded socialization as a sham and responded with a massive strike on 1 March 1944. In fact, the 12 February decree did not provide for socialization of capital, but of management, and unions were brought into company management

In Greece, while the government of the Kingdom of Italy surrendered and many Italian soldiers in the Aegean were tired of the war and had become opposed to Mussolini, Italian Fascist loyalists remained allied to Germany in the Greek campaign; German forces in Greece convinced 10,000 Italians in the Aegean to continue to support their war effort.

In 1944, Mussolini urged Hitler to focus on destroying Britain rather than the Soviet Union, as Mussolini claimed that it was Britain that had turned the conflict into a world war and that the British Empire must be destroyed in order for peace to come to Europe. Mussolini wanted to conduct a small offensive along the Gothic Line against the Allies with his new RSI Divisions; in December 1944, the Alpine Division "Monte Rosa" with some German battalions fought the Battle of Garfagnana with some success. As the situation became desperate, with Allied forces in control of most of Italy, and from February 1945 resumed pushing the Axis forces north of the Gothic Line, Mussolini declared that "he would fight to the last Italian" and spoke of turning Milan into the "Stalingrad of Italy", where Fascism would make its last glorious fight. Despite such strong rhetoric, Mussolini considered evacuating Fascists into Switzerland, although this was opposed by Germany, which instead proposed that Mussolini and key Fascist officials be taken into exile in Germany. Further disintegration of support for his government occurred as fascist and German military officials secretly tried to negotiate a truce with Allied forces, without consulting either Mussolini or Hitler.

== RSI military formations ==
=== Army ===
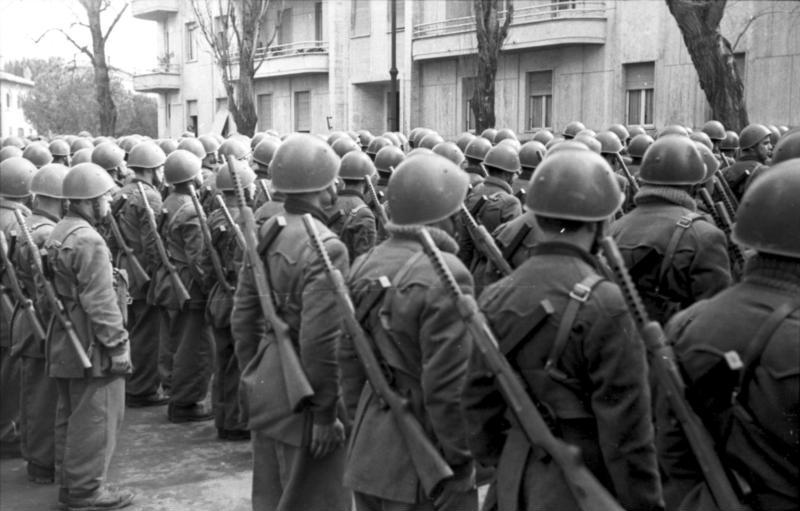
RSI soldiers, March 1944

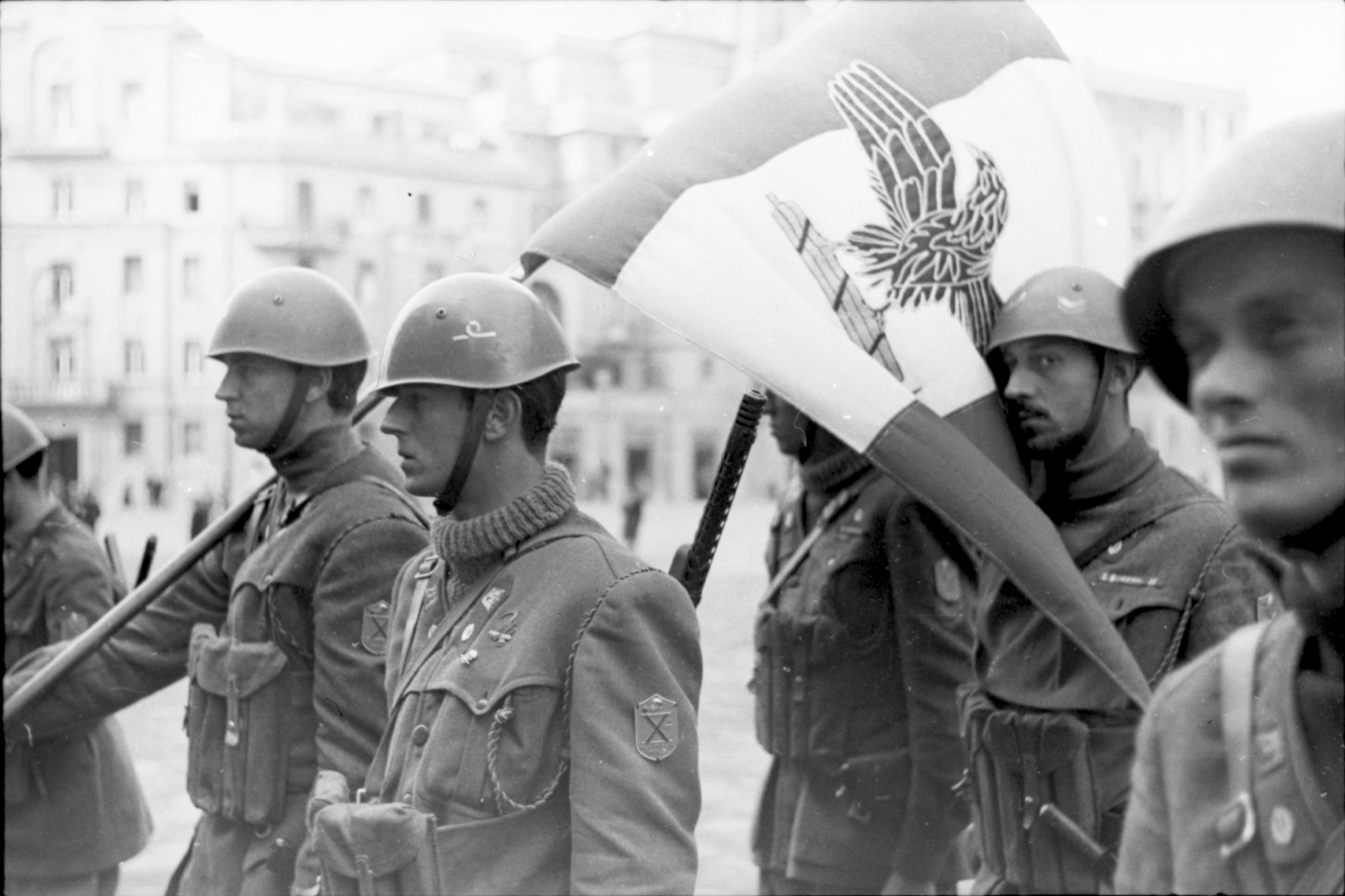
RSI soldiers deployed to the Battle for Anzio

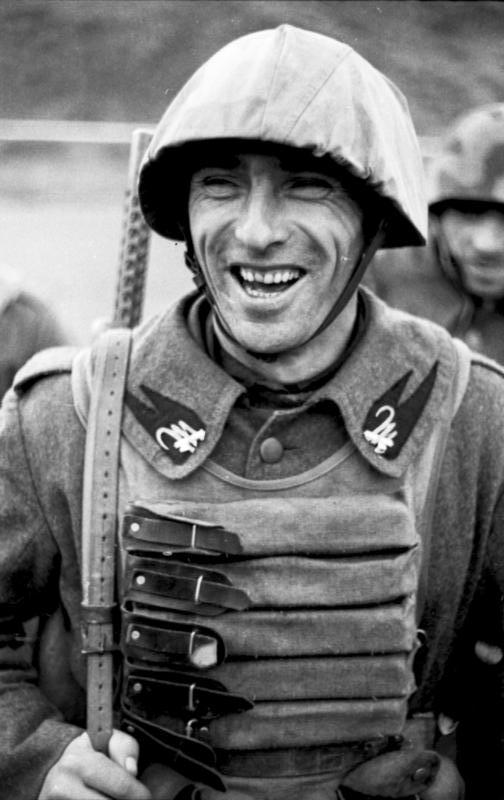
RSI soldier with signature "M" monogram on lapels and wearing a "samurai" magazine-holding vest for his Beretta MAB SMG (1943)

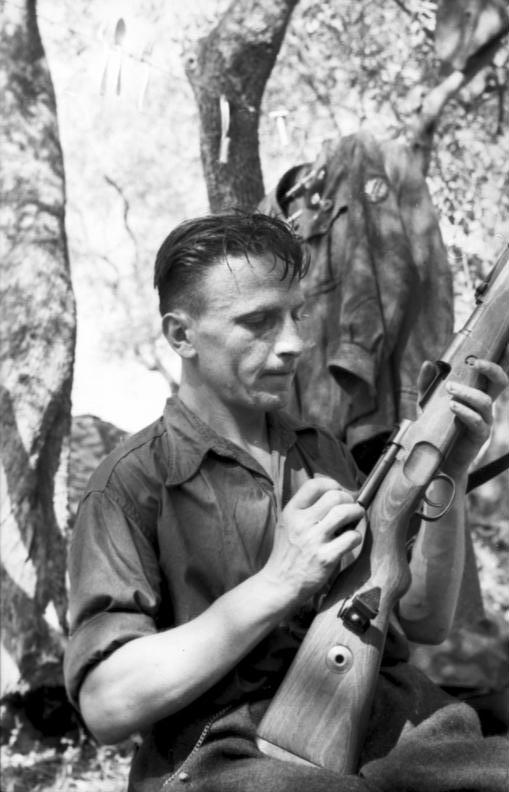
RSI soldier cleaning his weapon (Gothic line, 1944)

Smaller units like the Black Brigades (Brigate nere) led by Alessandro Pavolini and the Decima Flottiglia MAS led by Junio Valerio Borghese (called "principe nero", the Black Prince) fought for the RSI during its entire existence. The Germans were satisfied if these units were able to participate in anti-partisan activities.

In March 1944, the bulk of the 1st Italian volunteers Storm Brigade were sent to the Anzio beachhead, where they fought alongside their German allies, receiving favourable reports and taking heavy losses. In recognition of their performance, Heinrich Himmler declared the unit to be fully integrated into the Waffen SS.

On 16 October 1943, the Rastenburg Protocol was signed with Nazi Germany and the RSI was allowed to raise division-sized military formations. This protocol allowed Marshal Rodolfo Graziani to raise four RSI divisions totaling 52,000 men. In July 1944, the first of these divisions completed training and was sent to the front.

Recruiting military forces was difficult for the RSI as most of the Italian Army had been interned by German forces in 1943, many military-aged Italians had been conscripted into forced labour in Germany and few wanted to participate in the war. The RSI became so desperate for soldiers that it granted convicts freedom if they would join the army and imposed a sentence of death on anyone who opposed being conscripted. Autonomous military forces in the RSI also fought against the Allies including the notorious Decima Flottiglia MAS of Prince Junio Valerio Borghese. Borghese held no allegiance to Mussolini and even suggested that he would take him prisoner if he could.

During the winter of 1944–1945, armed Italians were on both sides of the Gothic Line. On the Allied side were four Italian groups of volunteers from the old Italian army. These Italian volunteers were equipped and trained by the British. On the Axis side were four RSI divisions. Three of the RSI divisions, the 2nd Grenadier Division "Littorio", the 3rd Italian "San Marco" Marine Division and the 4th Italian Monterosa Alpini Division were allocated to the LXXXXVII "Liguria" Army under Graziani and were placed to guard the western flank of the Gothic Line facing France. The fourth RSI division, the 1st Italian "Italia" Infantry Division, was attached to the German 14th Army in a sector of the Apennine Mountains thought least likely to be attacked.

On 26 December 1944, several sizeable RSI military units, including elements of the 4th Italian "Monterosa Division" Alpine Division and the 3rd Italian "San Marco" Marine Division, participated in Operation Winter Storm. This was a combined German and Italian offensive against the United States Army's 92nd Infantry Division. The battle was fought in the Apennines. While limited in scale, this was a successful offensive and the RSI units did their part.

The RSI military was under the command of General Alfredo Guzzoni while Field Marshal Rodolfo Graziani, the former governor-general of Italian Libya, was the RSI's Minister of Defense and commander-in-chief of the combined German-Italian Army Group Liguria. Mussolini, as Duce and head of state of RSI assumed supreme command over all military forces of the RSI.

In February 1945, the 92nd Infantry Division again came up against RSI units. This time it was Bersaglieri of the 1st Italian "Italia" Infantry Division. The Italians successfully halted the United States division's advance.

However, the situation continued to deteriorate for the Axis forces on Gothic Line. By mid-April 1945, the final Allied offensive in Italy had led German defences to collapse. At the end of that month, the last remaining troops of RSI were bottled up along with two Wehrmacht divisions at Collecchio by 1st Brazilian Division, being forced to surrender after some days of fighting.

On 29 April, Graziani surrendered and was present at Caserta when a representative of German General Heinrich von Vietinghoff-Scheel signed the unconditional instrument of surrender for all Axis forces in Italy, but since the Allies had never recognised the RSI Graziani's signature was not required at Caserta. The surrender was to take effect on 2 May; Graziani ordered all RSI forces under his command to lay down their arms on 1 May.

=== Air Force ===
The National Republican Air Force (Aeronautica Nazionale Repubblicana or ANR) was the air force of Italian Social Republic and also the air unit of National Republican Army. It was organized into three fighter groups, one torpedo bomber group, one bomber group, and other transport and minor units. The ANR worked closely with the German Air Force (Luftwaffe) in Northern Italy.

In 1944, after the withdrawal of all German fighter units for home air defense over Germany, ANR fighter groups were left alone and heavily outnumbered to face the massive Allied air offensive over Northern Italy. During 1944 and 1945, the ANR shot down 262 Allied aircraft for the loss in action of 158 of its own.

=== Navy ===
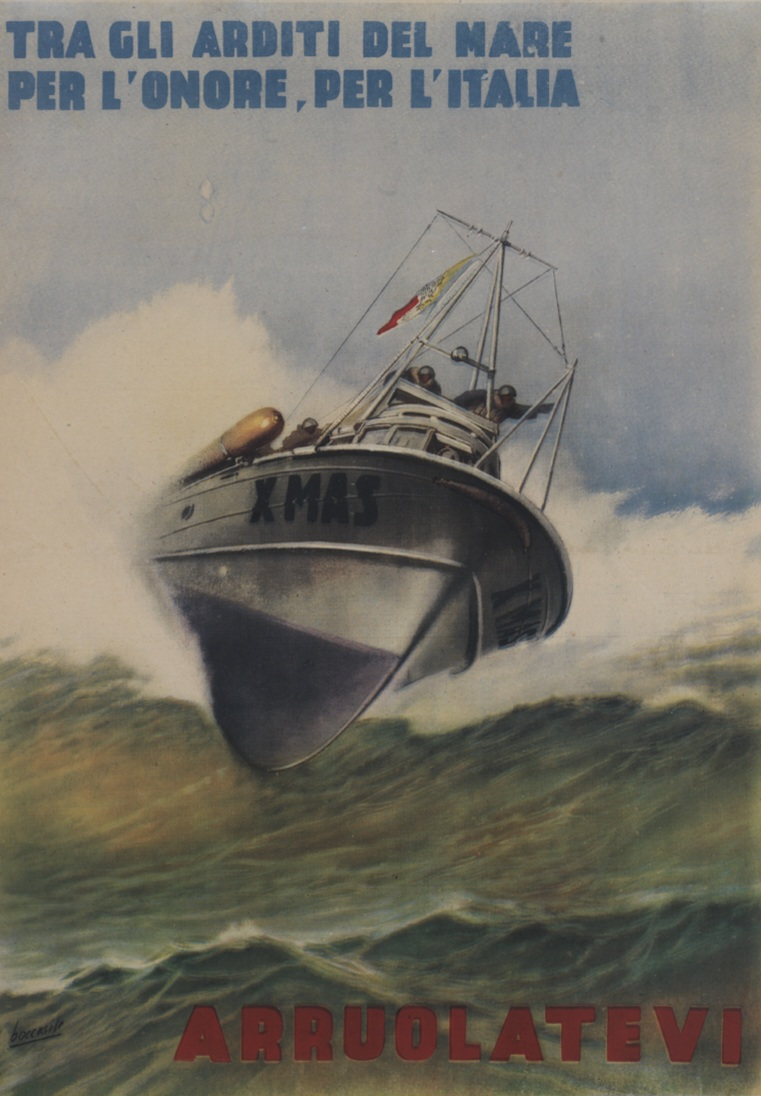
Recruitment poster by Gino Boccasile urging young men to join the National Republican Navy

Little of the Italian Regia Marina (Royal Navy) joined the RSI. This was because the bulk of the Regia Marina was ordered to steam to Malta at the time of the September 1943 armistice, where it was out of the reach of the Germans and the RSI. The RSI's National Republican Navy (Marina Nazionale Repubblicana or MNR) only reached a twentieth the size of the Italian Co-belligerent Navy that fought on the Allied side after the September 1943 armistice. The National Republican Navy consisted of nine motor torpedo boats (two large and seven small) and dozens of MTSM small motor torpedo boats and MTM explosive motorboats. The National Republican Navy also operated 15 CB-class midget submarines (ten in the Adriatic Sea and five in the Black Sea) and one larger submarine, CM1.

Troops of the Decima Flottiglia MAS (the elite Italian frogman corps) fought primarily as a land unit of the RSI.

Some of the naval personnel at the BETASOM submarine base in Bordeaux, France, remained loyal to Mussolini.

=== Paramilitaries ===
The fall of the Fascist regime in Italy and the disbandment of the MVSN or "Blackshirts" saw the establishment of the National Republican Guard (Guardia Nazionale Repubblicana or GNR) and the Republican Police Corps (Corpo di Polizia Repubblicana) and the emergence of the Black Brigades (brigate nere). The GNR consisted of former OVRA, carabinieri, soldiers, Italian Africa Police, and others still loyal to the Fascist cause, while the Republican Police Corps was the successor agency of the public security complex formed by the Directorate of Public Security and the Public Security Agents Corps. The Black Brigade was formed by the new fascist party members both young and old. Both units fought alongside Nazi Schutzstaffel (SS) counterparts against the Italian resistance movement in an extensive anti-partisan war. The Black Brigades committed many atrocities in their fight against the Italian resistance movement and political enemies. On 15 August 1944, the GNR became part of the National Republican Army.

=== Labour battalions ===
The Ispettorato Militare del Lavoro (ILM), informally called the Organizzazione Paladino or Azione Graziani, was an organization of the Italian Social Republic during World War II composed of volunteer labourers "to collaborate with the German authorities in repairing roads and railways, and in general carry out other work of either a civil or military nature." The organization was proposed by General Francesco Paladino. With German agreement, Marshal Rodolfo Graziani appointed Paladino its first director on 6 October 1943. Its headquarters was initially in Rome, and it was under the authority of the Ministry of Defence.

=== Women auxiliary service ===
Women volunteers served in uniform as noncombatants in paramilitary units and police formations (Servizio Ausiliario Femminile). The commander was the brigadier general Piera Gatteschi Fondelli.

== Government ==
The Government of the Italian Social Republic held office from 23 September 1943 until 25 April 1945, a total of 1 year, 274 days. Its head was Benito Mussolini.

The Government wrote a constitution for the Italian Social Republic, but it was never discussed or approved. On 13 October 1943, the Government announced that a Constituent Assembly would be called to write a new constitution, but that was cancelled by Mussolini on 14 November 1943 and delayed until after the end of the war. The disintegration of the Italian Social Republic at the end of the war meant that no new constitution was written.

The RSI was led by the Republican Fascist Party, established on 18 September 1943 out of the disbanded National Fascist Party. The party's official newspaper was Il Lavoro Fascista, formerly the publication of Fascist trade unions; Mussolini was largely indifferent toward the new paper and generally wrote on the Corriere della Sera instead. He refused to revive his former newspaper Il Popolo d'Italia, not willing to let it become a mouthpiece of the German occupation.

On 14 February 1945, Mussolini authorized the formation of a second political party called the National Republican Socialist Rally (RNRS, later rebranded as the Italian Socialist Republican Party) under the leadership of Edmondo Cione. The party supported a leftist view of fascism strongly focused on the socialization of the economy, and included several former socialists, such as Pulvio Zocchi, Carlo Silvestri, and Walter Mocchi; it also published a newspaper called L'Italia del Popolo. It was politically insignificant and its membership is unknown. Mussolini himself privately told German ambassador Rudolf Rahn that he only authorised the formation of the RNRS in an attempt to sway some working-class voters away from the National Liberation Committee and that it was never meant to create any real political pluralism.

In terms of geography, the core of the Italian Social Republic's government was actually not in Salò but in Gargnano, further north on the shore of Lake Garda, where Mussolini had both his residence and his office and where the Council of Ministers held most of its meetings. The name Salò was only associated with the RSI regime after liberation, possibly because the small town was the hub of regime-related journalistic activity and thus identified abroad as the source of news about it. Only two of the RSI's ministries were in Salò, the others being scattered far from Lake Garda.

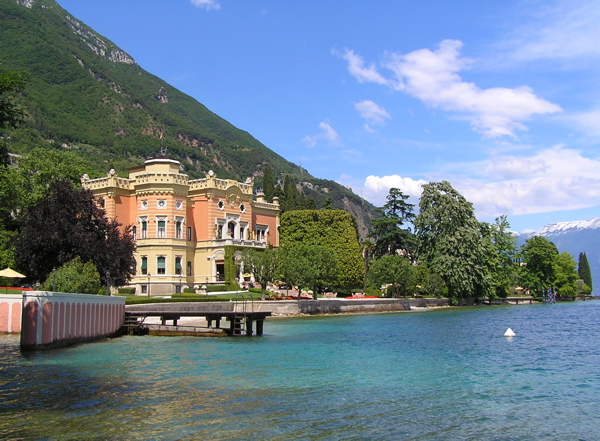
Villa Feltrinelli in Gargnano, Mussolini's residence during the RSI period

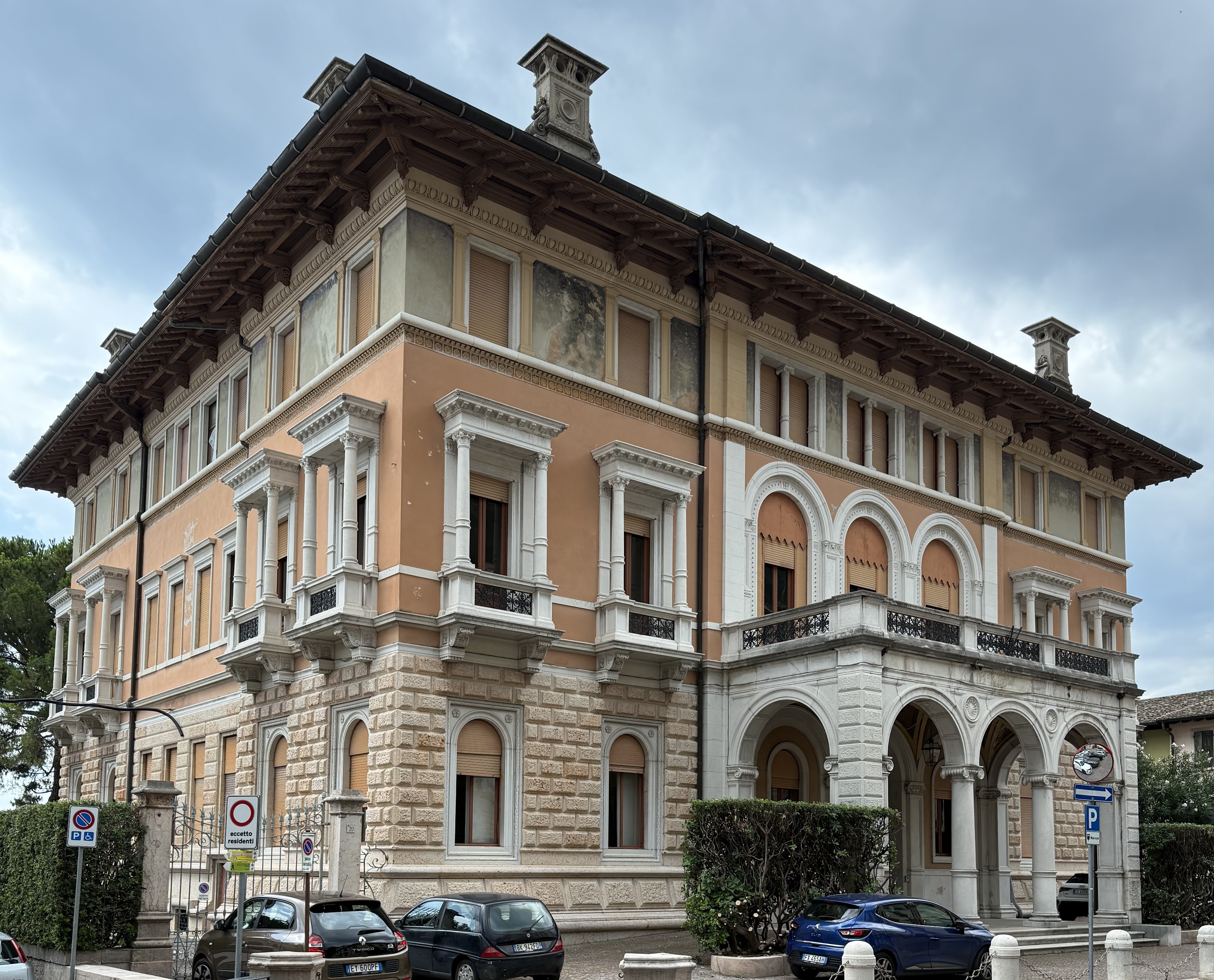
Palazzo Feltrinelli (also known as Villa Orsoline) in Gargnano, Mussolini's office and secretariat

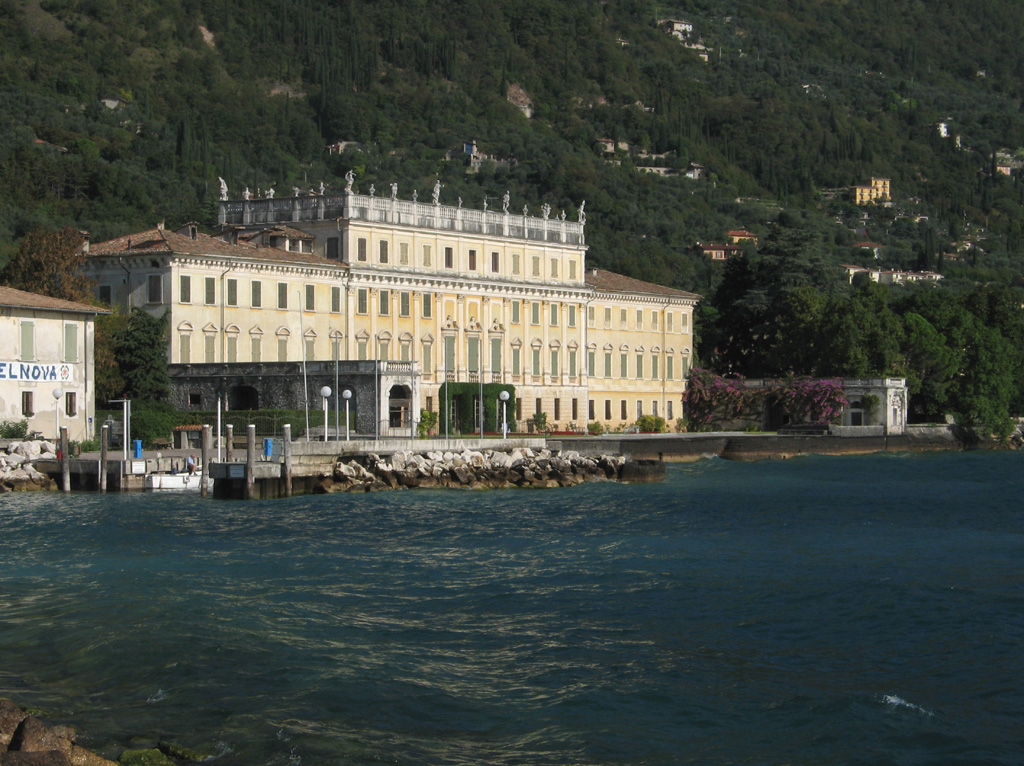
Villa Bettoni in Gargnano, seat of the Presidency of the Council of Ministers and venue of 15 of 17 of the Council's meetings

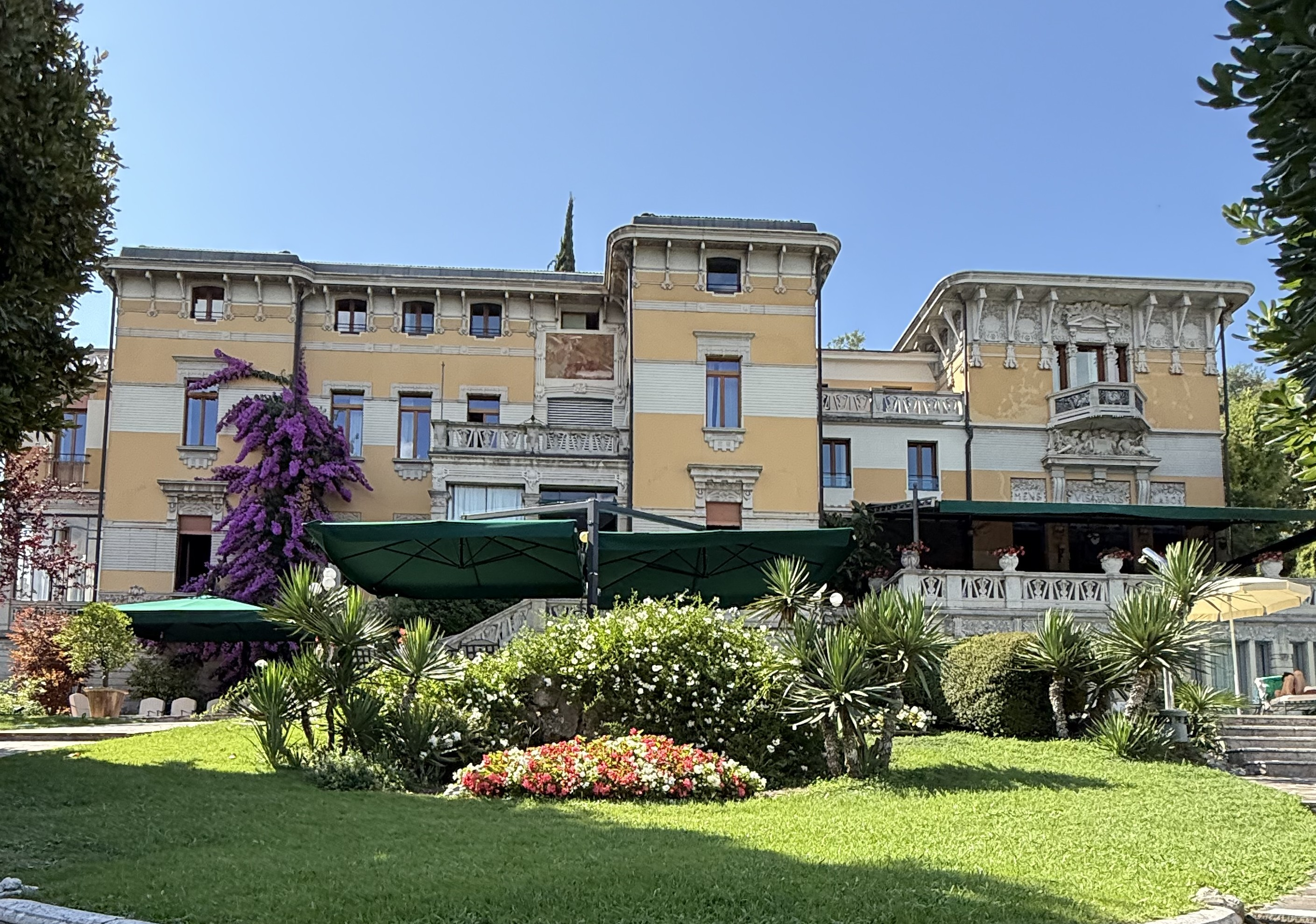
Hotel Laurin (formerly Villa Simonini) in Salò, seat of the RSI foreign affairs ministry

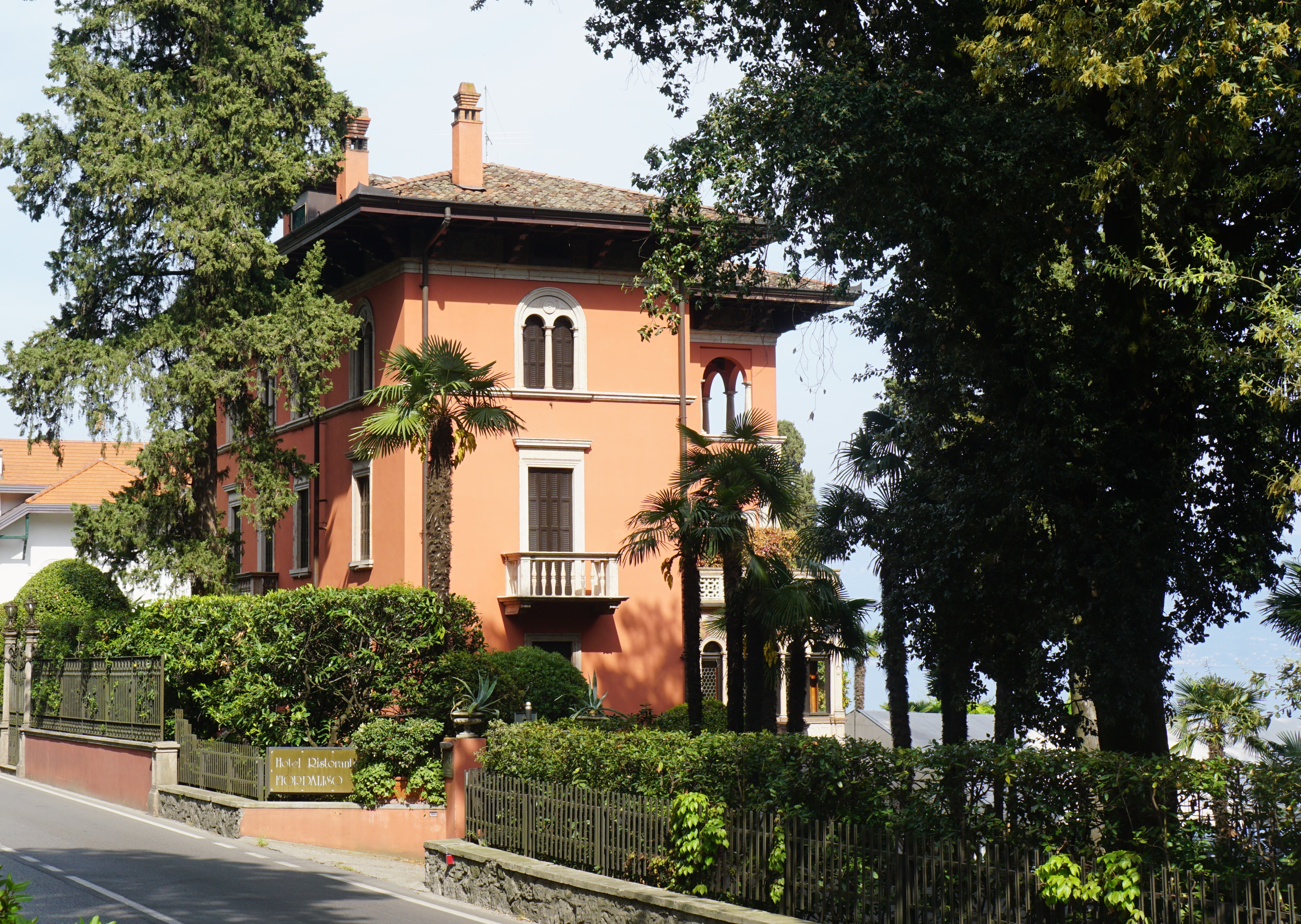
Villa Fiordalisio in Gardone Riviera, private residence of Clara Petacci, Mussolini's Mistress

=== Cabinet ===
Portfolio	Minister	Took office	Left office	Ref
Head of Government, Duce, and Minister of Foreign Affairs	Benito Mussolini	23 September 1943	25 April 1945	
Minister of the Interior	Guido Buffarini Guidi	23 September 1943	21 February 1945	
Minister of the Interior	Paolo Zerbino	21 February 1945	25 April 1945	
Minister of Grace and Justice	Antonino Tringali Casanuova	23 September 1943	30 October 1943 †	
Minister of Grace and Justice	Piero Pisenti	30 October 1943	25 April 1945	
Minister of Finance	Domenico Pellegrini Giampietro	23 September 1943	25 April 1945	
Minister of National Defence	Rodolfo Graziani	23 September 1943	25 April 1945	
Minister of National Economy	Carlo Alberto Biggini	23 September 1943	25 April 1945	
Minister of Corporative Economy	Silvio Gai	23 September 1943	31 December 1943	
Minister of Corporative Economy	Angelo Tarchi	1 January 1944	25 April 1945	
Minister of Public Works	Ruggero Romano	23 September 1943	25 April 1945	
Minister of Agriculture and Forests	Edoardo Moroni	23 September 1943	25 April 1945	
Minister of Popular Culture	Ferdinando Mezzasoma	23 September 1943	25 April 1945	
Minister of Labour	Giuseppe Spinelli	23 September 1943	25 April 1945	
Minister of Communications	Giuseppe Peverelli	23 September 1943	5 October 1943	
Minister of Communications	Augusto Liverani	5 October 1943	25 April 1945	
Minister of State's Activities	Renato Ricci	23 September 1943	25 April 1945	

== Legacy ==
=== In post-war Italian politics ===
While the RSI supported Nazi Germany, it allowed the Italian Fascist movement to build a completely totalitarian state. During the preceding twenty years of the Fascist association with the Savoy monarchy of the Kingdom of Italy, some Fascist actions had been restricted by the monarchy. However, the formation of the RSI enabled Mussolini to become the official head of an Italian state and allowed the Fascists to return to their earlier republican stances. In one way or another, most of the prominent leaders of the post-war Italian far-right (both parliamentary and extraparliamentary) were associated with the experience of the RSI. Among them were Filippo Anfuso, Pino Romualdi, Rodolfo Graziani, Junio Valerio Borghese, Licio Gelli, Clemente Graziani and Giorgio Almirante, many of whom would be involved in the founding of the Neo-fascist Italian Social Movement. Most of the 8,000 Italian Jews who died in the Holocaust in Italy were killed during the 20 months of the Salò regime.

=== Stamps ===
A number of postage stamps were issued by the Republic of Salò. Initially, existing Italian issues were overprinted with a fasces, or the initials "G.N.R." for the Guardia Nazionale Repubblicana (Republican National Guard). Later the government designed and printed three series, all of which are very common.

=== Currency ===
Banknotes in 50, 100, 500, and 1000 lire denomination were printed by the Republic. As issuer, the country was not mentioned on them, but rather only the Bank of Italy.

=== In the arts ===
Pier Paolo Pasolini's 1975 film Salò, or the 120 Days of Sodom is an adaptation of Marquis de Sade's The 120 Days of Sodom, set in the Republic of Salò, instead of 18th-century France. It uses the source material as an allegory; the atrocities in the film did not actually happen, while most of the choices of milieus, clothing, uniforms, weapons and other details are historically accurate. Roberto Benigni's 1997 Life is Beautiful is also set in the Republic of Salò.

Bernardo Bertolucci's 1976 Novecento set his story in Emilia, being at the time a province of the Italian Social Republic, even though this is never mentioned in the movie. Wild Blood tells the true story of the Fascist film stars Luisa Ferida and Osvaldo Valenti and their support for the Republic.

Futurist writer and poet Filippo Tommaso Marinetti, a Mussolini loyalist who had helped shape Fascist philosophy, remained in the RSI as a propagandist until his death from a heart attack at Bellagio in December 1944.

== See also ==
- 29th Waffen Grenadier Division of the SS (1st Italian)
- Decima Flottiglia MAS
- Italian Civil War
- Italian fascism
- Ministry of Occupied Italy
- National Republican Guard (Italy)
- Republican Police Corps
