= First Badoglio government =

60th government of Kingdom of Italy

- 60th Cabinet of Italy

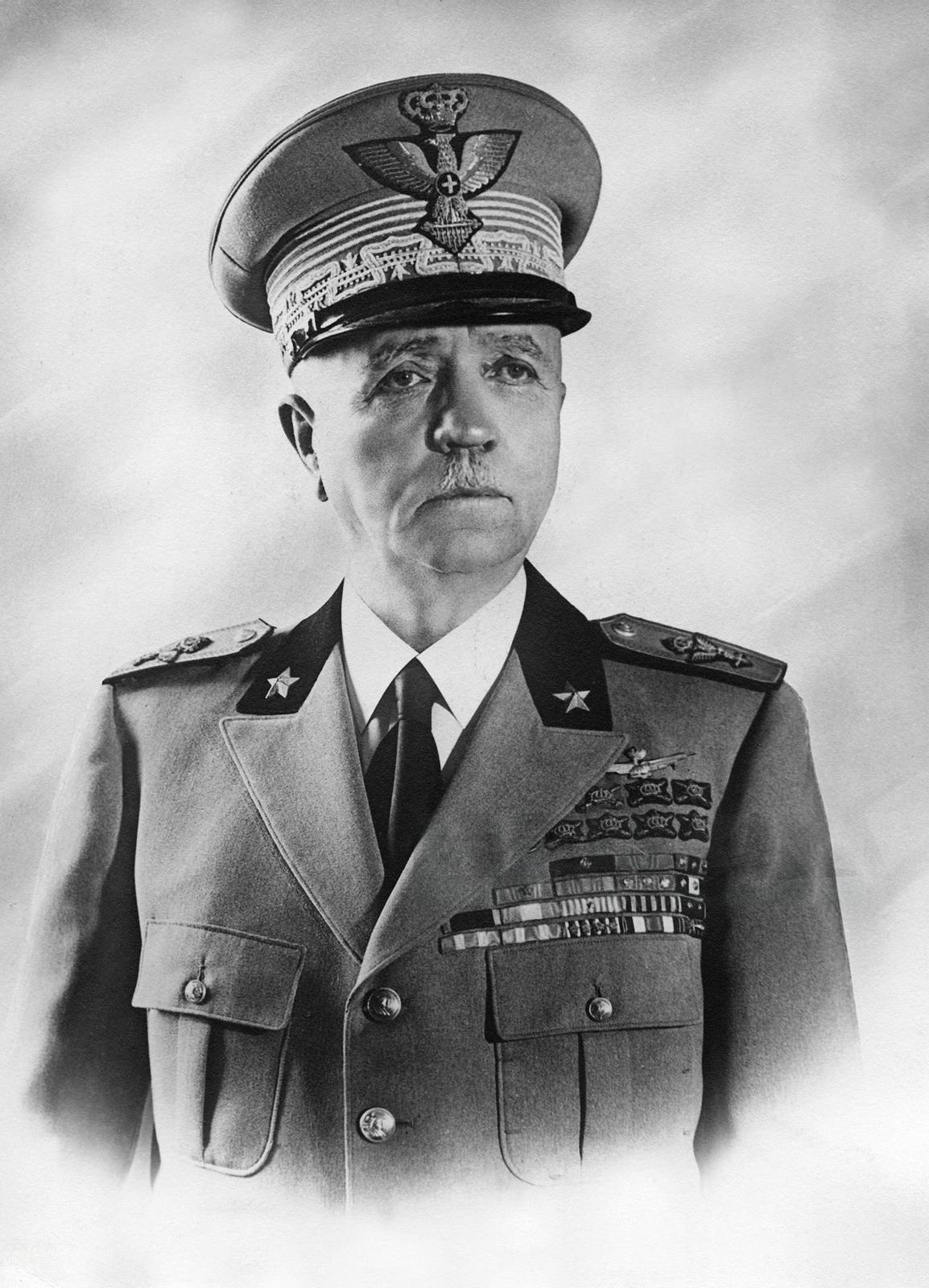
- Date formed: 25 July 1943
- Date dissolved: 24 April 1944

People and organisations
- Head of state: Victor Emmanuel III
- Head of government: Pietro Badoglio
- Total no. of members: 16
- Member party: Independents; Military

History
- Predecessor: Mussolini government
- Successor: Second Badoglio government

The first Badoglio government led the Kingdom of Italy from 25 July 1943 until 24 April 1944, a total of 273 days, or 9 months and 3 days. It was established following the fall of the Mussolini government after the approval of Dino Grandi's order of the day by the Grand Council of Fascism, in turn leading to the fall of the Fascist regime in Italy. Due to the needs arising from World War II and the threat of an Italian Civil War, it was a transitional government that was a de facto transitional technical-military executive of King Victor Emmanuel III. It was the first government led by a military man since the second Pelloux government (1899–1900) and was composed of six generals, two prefects, six officials, and two state councilors.

== Composition ==
Office	Name	Party	Term
Prime Minister	Pietro Badoglio	Military	(1943–1944)
Minister of the Interior	Bruno Fornaciari	Independent	(1943–1943)
Minister of the Interior	Umberto Ricci	Independent	(1943–1944)
Minister of the Interior	Vito Reale	Independent	(1944–1944)
Minister of Foreign Affairs	Raffaele Guariglia	Independent	(1943–1944)
Minister of Foreign Affairs	Pietro Badoglio	Military	(1944–1944)
Minister of Grace and Justice	Gaetano Azzariti	Independent	(1943–1944)
Minister of Grace and Justice	Ettore Casati	Independent	(1944–1944)
Minister of Finance	Domenico Bartolini	Independent	(1943–1944)
Minister of Finance	Guido Jung	Independent	(1944–1944)
Minister of War	Antonio Sorice	Military	(1943–1944)
Minister of War	Taddeo Orlando	Military	(1944–1944)
Minister of the Navy	Raffaele de Courten	Military	(1943–1944)
Minister of Air Force	Renato Sandalli	Military	(1943–1944)
Minister of Industry and Commerce	Leopoldo Piccardi	Independent	(1943–1943)
Minister of Industry and Commerce	Epicarmo Corbino	Independent	(1943–1944)
Minister of Public Works	Domenico Romano	Independent	(1943–1944)
Minister of Public Works	Raffaele De Caro	Independent	(1943–1944)
Minister of Agriculture and Forests	Alessandro Brizi	Independent	(1943–1944)
Minister of Agriculture and Forests	Falcone Lucifero	Independent	(1944–1944)
Minister of National Education	Leonardo Severi	Independent	(1943–1944)
Minister of National Education	Giovanni Cuomo	Independent	(1943–1944)
Minister of Popular Culture	Guido Rocco	Independent	(1943–1943)
Minister of Popular Culture	Carlo Galli	Independent	(1943–1944)
Minister of Popular Culture	Giovanni Cuomo	Independent	(1943–1944)
Minister of Communications	Federico Amoroso	Military	(1943–1944)
Minister of Communications	Tommaso Siciliani	Independent	(1944–1944)
Minister of Italian Africa	Melchiade Gabba	Military	(1943–1944)
Minister of Italian Africa	Pietro Badoglio	Military	(1944–1944)
Minister for Exchanges and Currencies	Giovanni Acanfora	Independent	(1943–1944)
Minister for Exchanges and Currencies	Guido Jung	Independent	(1944–1944)
Minister of War Production	Carlo Favagrossa	Military	(1943–1944)
Secretary of the Council of Ministers	Pietro Baratono	Independent	(1943–1944)
Secretary of the Council of Ministers	Dino Philipson	Independent	(1944–1944)

== See also ==
- Armistice of Cassibile
- Fascist Italy
- Italian Social Republic
- Military government
- Technocracy
- Technocratic government (Italy)
