= Giovanni Acanfora =

Italian politician

Minister of Exchanges and Currencies of the Kingdom of Italy
- In office 26 July 1943 – 24 February 1944
- Preceded by: Oreste Bonomi
- Succeeded by: Guido Jung

Personal details
- Born: 7 April 1884 Castellammare di Stabia, Kingdom of Italy
- Died: 8 March 1976 (aged 91)

Military service
- Allegiance: Kingdom of Italy
- Branch/service: Royal Italian Army
- Battles/wars: World War I; Battles of the Isonzo
- Awards: War Cross for Military Valor

Giovanni Acanfora (Castellammare di Stabia, 7 April 1884 – 8 March 1976) was an Italian banker and civil servant, who served as Minister of Exchanges and Currencies of the Kingdom of Italy of the Badoglio I Cabinet, the first after the fall of the Fascist regime, and as Director-General of the Bank of Italy.

== Biography ==
Born in Castellammare di Stabia, he graduated in law from the University of Naples in 1907 and started working for the Ministry of Finance four years later, gradually rising through the ranks. He fought in the First World War and was wounded on the Banjšice Plateau, earning a War Cross for Military Valor. From 1926 to 1928 he was head of the Italian delegation of Treasury in Paris, and later participated in a number of international conferences; in 1938 he became Inspector-General at the Ministry of Finance. He was director-general of the Bank of Italy from 22 May 1940 to 26 July 1943, under Governor Vincenzo Azzolini. After the fall of Fascism, he was appointed Minister of Exchanges and Currencies of the Kingdom of Italy of the Badoglio I Cabinet from 26 July 1943 to 24 February 1944, although he de facto ceased from his functions after the armistice of Cassibile in September 1943, as he did not follow the king and government in their flight from Rome to Brindisi. He was wanted by the authorities of the Italian Social Republic, but managed to evade capture, hiding in San Giovanni in Laterano along with fellow ministers Umberto Ricci, Domenico Bartolini and Leonardo Severi and anti-fascist leaders that included Pietro Nenni, Alcide De Gasperi, Ivanoe Bonomi and Giuseppe Saragat. After the liberation of Rome, he returned to his post as director-general of the Bank of Italy, and testified at the trial of Vincenzo Azzolini for the handover of the gold of the Bank of Italy to the Germans during the occupation. He died in 1976.
