= Acanfora =

Acanfora is a surname of Italian origin. Notable people with the surname include:

- Giovanni Acanfora (1884–1976), Italian banker
- Joe Acanfora (born 1950), American educator and activist
- Renato Acanfora (born 1957), Italian football player
