= Carlo Galli (diplomat) =

Italian diplomat

Minister of Popular Culture of the Kingdom of Italy
- In office 15 August 1943 – 24 February 1944
- Preceded by: Guido Rocco
- Succeeded by: Giovanni Cuomo

Ambassador of the Kingdom of Italy to Turkey
- In office January 1935 – 21 June 1938
- Preceded by: Vincenzo Lojacono
- Succeeded by: Ottavio De Peppo

Ambassador of the Kingdom of Italy to Yugoslavia
- In office 3 June 1928 – 19 June 1935
- Preceded by: Carlo Baroli
- Succeeded by: Guido Viola di Campalto

Ambassador of the Kingdom of Italy to Portugal
- In office 3 June 1926 – 3 June 1928
- Preceded by: Livio Borghese
- Succeeded by: Giuseppe Bastianini

Ambassador of the Kingdom of Italy to Persia
- In office September 1924 – September 1926
- Preceded by: Camillo Romano Avezzana
- Succeeded by: Guido Viola di Campalto

Personal details
- Born: 25 November 1878 Florence, Kingdom of Italy
- Died: 12 January 1966 (aged 87) Venice, Italy
- Awards: Order of Saints Maurice and Lazarus

Carlo Galli (Florence, 25 November 1878 – Venice, 12 January 1966) was an Italian diplomat, who served as Italian ambassador to Persia, Portugal, Yugoslavia and Turkey and as Minister of Popular Culture of the Kingdom of Italy in the Badoglio I Cabinet.

== Biography ==
After graduating in law from the University of Florence, in 1904, Galli started his diplomatic career at the Italian consulate in Trieste, where he remained for some years, helping fuel Italian irredentism (he himself was a convinced nationalist). In June 1911, he was appointed consul in Tripoli, where he helped prepare the Italian invasion of Libya, after which he returned to Trieste. He later held other consular posts abroad (and was a member of the International Control Commission in Albania in 1913) until the outbreak of the First World War, when he was transferred to the General Secretariat for Civil Affairs at the Supreme Command.

After the end of the war, from January 1919 to December 1922, he was sent to Paris and was part of the Italian delegation to the Versailles Peace Conference. In January 1923 he was appointed Consul General in Damascus, where he remained until April 1924, when he was appointed Ambassador to Teheran (Persia) for two years, having meanwhile joined the National Fascist Party. From November 1926 to May 1928 he served as Ambassador to Lisbon (Portugal), from June 1928 to December 1934 as Ambassador to Belgrade (Yugoslavia), and from January 1935 to June 1938 as Ambassador to Ankara (Turkey). During the 1930s he became increasingly detached from the Fascist regime, until he was retired in June 1938. In 1939 he joined the board of directors of Assicurazioni Generali, where he remained for some years.

After the fall of the regime on 25 July 1943 he returned to politics and in August he was appointed Minister of Popular Culture of the first Badoglio Government, formally holding the post from 15 August 1943 to 24 February 1944, although in reality he ceased from his functions following the armistice of Cassibile, as he did not follow the king and government in their flight from Rome to Brindisi and retired to private life in Venice. He was however wanted by the Italian Social Republic and was forced to go into hiding in Nerviano, hosted by his friend Paolo Caccia Dominioni, until in December 1944 he was arrested along with Caccia Dominoni himself and General Luigi Trionfi and imprisoned initially in San Vittore and later in Lumezzane, where he remained until April 1945. At the end of the war, he was freed and was able to return to Venice, where he retired to private life.
