= Raffaello Riccardi =

Italian politician (1899–1977)

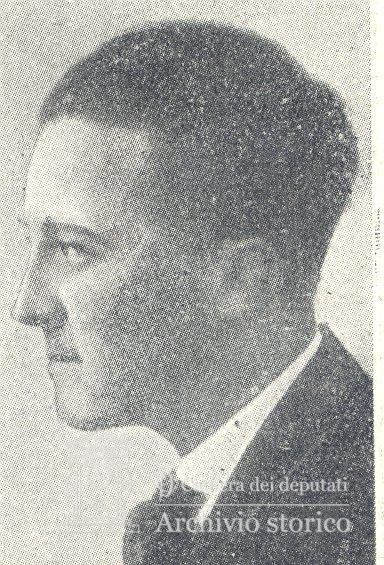

Minister for Exchanges and Currencies of the Kingdom of Italy
- In office 31 October 1939 – 6 February 1943
- Preceded by: Felice Guarneri
- Succeeded by: Oreste Bonomi
- State Undersecretary of the Ministry of Communications of the Kingdom of Italy
- In office 9 July 1928 – 11 September 1929
- Preceded by: Alessandro Martelli
- Succeeded by: Ferdinando Pierazzi

State Undersecretary of the Ministry of Aeronautics of the Kingdom of Italy
- In office 12 September 1929 – 6 November 1933
- Preceded by: Italo Balbo
- Succeeded by: Giuseppe Valle
- Member of the Chamber of Deputies of the Kingdom of Italy
- In office 24 May 1924 – 2 March 1939
- Member of the Chamber of Fasces and Corporations
- In office 23 March 1939 – 5 August 1943

Personal details
- Born: 4 February 1899 Moscow, Russian Empire
- Died: 1977 (age 78) Rome, Italy
- Party: National Fascist Party; Republican Fascist Party

Military service
- Allegiance: Kingdom of Italy
- Branch/service: Royal Italian Army
- Battles/wars: World War I

Raffaello Riccardi (Moscow, 4 February 1899 – Rome, 1977) was an Italian Fascist politician. He was the minister for Exchanges and Currencies of the Kingdom of Italy from October 1939 to February 1943.

== Biography ==
Born to a Russian mother, he took part in the First World War as a cavalry officer. After the war he joined the nascent Fascist movement, and was among the founders of the Senigallia section of the Italian Fasces of Combat in July 1920 and of that of Pesaro a few months later, where he founded and directed the weekly magazine L'Ora. He was also a prominent leader of the Fascist "squads" in the Marche, leading several expeditions against anti-fascists; in October 1922 he commanded an expedition to Fossombrone in retaliation for the killing of two Fascists, in which the Communist activist Giuseppe Valenti was tortured and shot. In order to escape the subsequent arrest warrant for voluntary murder, he temporarily moved under a false identity to Sicily, where he assisted the Mafia in placing workers of the sulfur mines in the Fascist trade unions; he was sentenced to four months and fifteen days in prison for the murder of Valenti, but the sentence was cancelled by an amnesty proclaimed by the newly established Fascist regime on 22 December 1922 (in the meantime, Riccardi had participated in the March on Rome). In 1939 he published a memoir on the period of the squadrismo in the Marche, Pagine Squadriste, in which he recalled numerous episodes of political violence of which he had been the protagonist, directing the Fascist squad of Pesaro, writing: "Violence is the midwife of the revolution, in whose hands the new order is born (...) The great ascensional parables that peoples build and launch beyond their own destiny are illuminated by the blood that generated them. I believe in violence; and to it I attribute thaumaturgical faculties. Violence is, in the political life of a people, what the crisis is in its economic life: the corrective par excellence".

In the early 1920s he was provincial trustee of the National Fascist Party and private secretary of deputy Silvio Gai, and in 1924 he was elected to the Italian Parliament, and re-elected in 1929. He held various offices within the Mussolini Cabinet during the following years, serving as undersecretary of the Ministry of Communications from 9 July 1928 to 11 September 1929, and as undersecretary of the Ministry of Aeronautics from 12 September 1929 to 6 November 1933. In 1934 he was once again re-elected as member of the Chamber of Deputies, and in 1939 he became a member of the Chamber of Fasces and Corporations, as well as consul general of the Volunteer Militia for National Security. On 31 October 1939 he was appointed Minister for Exchange and Currencies, as well as president of the National Institute for Foreign Exchange and Commissioner of the Fascist National Institute for Foreign Trade. As Minister, he brought Mussolini evidence of the involvement of Marcello Petacci in several financial scandals in 1942. In 1938-1939 he was also president of the Polisportiva S.S. Lazio and of the Italian Boxing Federation. In 1942 he was awarded an honorary law degree from the University of Urbino.

His political rise was accompanied by considerable enrichment, and at the beginning of the 1930s he was involved in a series of government inquiries on a number of enterprises in Pesaro, such the Pesaro Savings Bank, the Consortium of Production and Work Cooperatives, and the Società Anonima Industria Bagni e Alberghi (SAIBA), which revealed a control system of these institutions, managed by former squadristi, still headed by Riccardi. According to the investigations, the executives of these companies exploited them for the purpose of personal enrichment, in a dense network of abuses and irregularities. The investigations revealed instances of Riccardi's direct influence on the system, money flows to him, and the use of his name by local executives to strengthen their control. In 1940 Mussolini asked him to clarify persistent rumors relating to his economic interests; Riccardi replied by affirming his honesty. In 1942 further investigations indicated that Riccardi had invested capital in Switzerland. On 6 February 1943 he was dismissed from his post and replaced as Minister by Oreste Bonomi.

After the fall of the Fascist regime on 25 July 1943, Riccardi was arrested by order of Marshal Pietro Badoglio and imprisoned in the Regina Coeli prison, from which he was freed by the Germans after their occupation of Italy in September 1943. He was then taken to Munich and joined the Italian Social Republic, without however holding any political office. After the end of the war, in July 1947 he was tried for the 1922 murder of Valenti, but was acquitted due to insufficient evidence, and declared that the episodes narrated in Pagine Squadriste were fictional. He publishes a memoir in 1946, and retired to private life in Lugano, Switzerland. He died in Rome in 1977.
