= Leonardo Severi =

Italian politician (1882–1958)

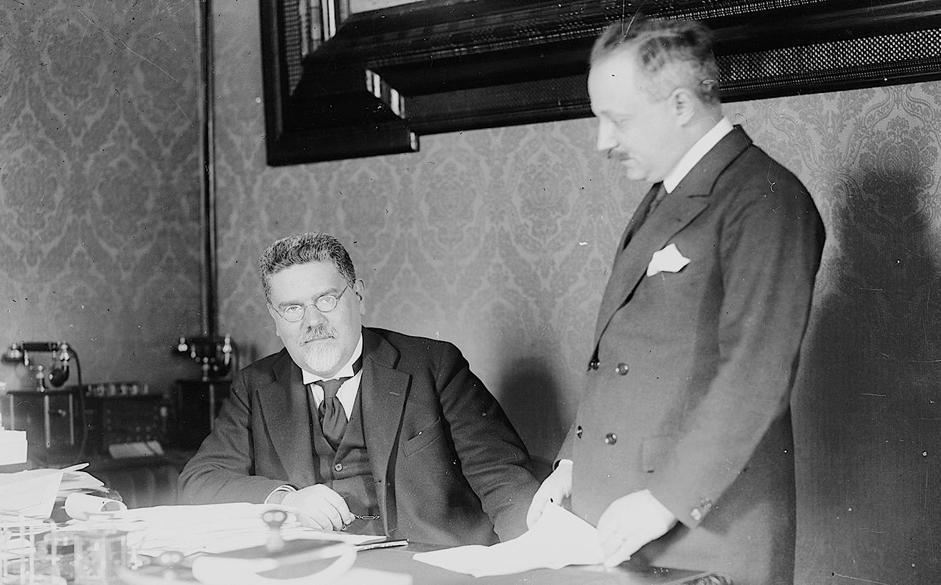
- Leonardo Severi (right) with Giovanni Gentile

Minister of National Education of the Kingdom of Italy
- In office 27 July 1943 – 11 February 1944
- Preceded by: Carlo Alberto Biggini
- Succeeded by: Giovanni Cuomo

President of the Italian Council of State
- In office 8 February 1951 – 31 December 1952
- Preceded by: Ferdinando Rocco
- Succeeded by: Raffaele Pio Petrilli

Personal details
- Born: 31 December 1882 Fano, Kingdom of Italy
- Died: 28 May 1958 (aged 75) Fano, Italy
- Party: Liberal Union; National Fascist Party
- Civilian awards: Order of Merit of the Italian Republic

Military service
- Allegiance: Kingdom of Italy
- Branch/service: Royal Italian Army
- Rank: Captain
- Unit: Alpini
- Battles/wars: World War I; Battle of Vittorio Veneto
- Military awards: Bronze Medal of Military Valor

Leonardo Severi (Fano, 31 December 1882 – 28 May 1958) was an Italian politician and civil servant, who served as Minister of National Education of the Kingdom of Italy of the Badoglio I Cabinet, the first after the fall of the Fascist regime, and as president of the Council of State in 1951–1952.

== Biography ==
Born in the Marche to Zaccaria Severi and Giulia Masarini, into an aristocratic family, he graduated in law at the University of Rome and then began his career in the public administration, initially at the Ministry of the Interior (1905-1907) and then at the Ministry of Public Education. In 1913 he was appointed Supervisor of Education in Potenza, but two years later he enlisted as a volunteer in the Alpini after the outbreak of the First World War, rising in rank from second lieutenant to captain and earning a Bronze Medal of Military Valor on Monte Solarolo during the battle of Vittorio Veneto.

After the end of the war he resumed his career at the Education Ministry, serving as deputy head of cabinet under Minister Benedetto Croce, in 1920-1921, and as head of cabinet under Minister Giovanni Gentile, playing a key role in the Gentile Reform. In 1924 he became director-general of middle education, but in the following year he came into conflict with the new Education Minister Pietro Fedele, who under pressure from the regime, was softening the "excessive severity" of the Gentile Reform. This earned him the enmity of Michele Bianchi and Achille Starace; under attack from the most hardliner Fascist press, in 1926 he belatedly joined the National Fascist Party (he had previously been a member of the Liberal Union), but in 1928 he was forcibly retired by Giuseppe Belluzzo. He did not hold any public offices until 1932, when he was made a member of the Council of State. In the late 1930s he returned to work at the Ministry of National Education under Giuseppe Bottai, an old acquaintance, and then at the Ministry of Popular Culture.

After the fall of the Fascist regime on 25 July 1943, he was recommended by Marcello Soleri to Pietro d'Acquarone as Minister of National Education of the new government. He was thus appointed Minister on 27 July, and supervised the epuration of Fascist rectors (such as those of the universities of Turin, Rome, Naples, Florence, Pisa and Padua; among the anti-fascist rectors appointed in their place were Piero Calamandrei, Luigi Einaudi, Adolfo Omodeo, Guido De Ruggiero and Concetto Marchesi), and the "de-fascistization" of school textbooks. In August 1943 he quarrelled with Gentile, then director of the Scuola Normale Superiore di Pisa, who as a result resigned from his post. After the armistice of Cassibile and the German occupation of Rome he took shelter in San Giovanni in Laterano, where he met Alcide De Gasperi and Ivanoe Bonomi; Giovanni Cuomo replaced him as Minister from November 1943, although he officially remained in office until February 1944. From the liberation of Rome, and until after the war, he was a member of several government committees; on 8 February 1951 he became president of the Council of State, a post he held until December 1952, when he retired after reaching the age limits. He died in his native Fano in 1958.
