= Tommaso Siciliani =

Italian jurist

Minister of Communications of the Kingdom of Italy
- In office 11 February 1944 – 17 April 1944
- Preceded by: Federico Amoroso
- Succeeded by: Francesco Cerabona

Personal details
- Born: 19 March 1882 Ginosa, Kingdom of Italy
- Died: 23 January 1964 (aged 81) Noci, Italy

Military service
- Allegiance: Kingdom of Italy
- Branch/service: Royal Italian Army
- Rank: Captain
- Battles/wars: World War I

Tommaso Siciliani (Ginosa, 19 March 1882 – Noci, 23 January 1964) was an Italian jurist and politician, who served as Minister of Communications of the Kingdom of Italy in the Badoglio I Cabinet.

== Biography ==
He was born in 1882, the son of Alfonso Siciliani, and graduated in Law at the University of Macerata, where among his teachers was Alfredo Rocco. He then continued his studies at the University of Rome, where he became free lecturer in civil procedural law in 1910. Following the death of his father he returned to Bari, where he taught civil law and other subjects at the Higher Institute of commercial studies from 1908 to 1926, except for the years of the First World War, in which he fought and reached the rank of captain. In 1926 he became teacher of civil procedural law, civil law, institutions of Roman law, and institutions of private law at the University of Bari, while also publishing a number of books on jurisprudence. He also worked as a lawyer at the Court of Appeal of Bari and at the Court of Cassation. An oldtime liberal and monarchist who had been active in politics before the rise of the Fascist regime, on 11 February 1944 he was appointed Minister of Communications of the Badoglio I Cabinet, a post he held until 17 April 1944. During his brief tenure he introduced a law that mandated the use of the CAP in the five largest Italian cities and had to deal with the Balvano train disaster, the worst in Italian history, which in his report to the Council of Ministers he blamed to the low quality coal provided by the Allies. In the early 1950s he was president of the Bar of Bari.
