= Republic of Maschito =

Italian partisan republic during World War II

- Government: Popular Democratic Redistributionist Agrarian Republic
  - Founder: Domenico Bochicchio
  - Mayor: Giuseppe Guglielmucci

Establishment
  - Founded: 15 September 1943
  - Dissolved: 5 October 1943
- Today part of: Republic of Italy

The Republic of Maschito (Italian: Repubblica di Maschito) was a short-lived partisan republic established in the town of Maschito, located in the Basilicata region of southern Italy, following the collapse of the Fascist regime and the Armistice of Cassibile in September 1943. It is mistakenly called the first Italian partisan republic, and whilst it was one of the first, the first recorded partisan republic is actually the Kobarid Republic.

== History ==
In September 1943, following the announcement of the Armistice of Cassibile between Italy and Allied forces, central state authority across Southern Italy collapsed. In many rural towns in Basilicata, long-standing grievances over landlordism (latifondismo), poverty, economic inequality, and decades of authoritarian rule under Benito Mussolini boiled over into popular revolts. In Maschito, a small town populated historically by Arbëreshë communities, local peasants and laborers organized to oust fascist officials and local landowning elites who had dominated the municipal administration. Specifically in Maschito, the immediate catalyst for insurrection was widespread rumor that the local fascist municipality was preparing to reinstate its authority with the direct military backing of German army units operating in the nearby area.

On 15 September 1943, the Republic of Maschito was proclaimed after a group of seven partisans led by Domenico Bochicchio, an ex-exiled italian citizen, who took over the headquarter of the local Agrarian Consortium and broke into the home of Giuseppe Cangianelli, a loyal member of the National Fascist Party and the manager of the resources within the consortium. The partisans do not only liberate the town but decide to establish a republic with its own democratic government. Following the raid, they deposed the Fascist podestà, a local popular assembly declared all Fascist authorities and the House of Savoy to have lost their legitimacy in Maschito and proclaimed a peasant anti-fascist republic.

The new administration organized the defense of Maschito against German forces advancing from Forenza and prevented local Fascists from reorganizing.

The republic ceased to exist due to the Allied invasion of Italy reaching it. The negative reaction of the Allied Powers to the establishment of the republic was tied to the fact that they saw the grassroot government of Maschito as "suspicious", "radical" and "unstable". Following the dismemberment of the republic by the Allies, the area was assigned to Vito Reale, Francesco Saverio Nitti and in some cases local former fascist officials. Some former members of the republic's government were arrested by the Allies.

In the aftermath, the leaders of the republic were released shortly after being arrested. However, they were arrested again in May 1944, prosecuted, and ultimately acquitted. Meanwhile the town remained in an administrative limbo up until April 1946, when a new municipal council was elected and Giuseppe Santoianni of the Christian Democracy party became mayor.

== Government and ideology ==
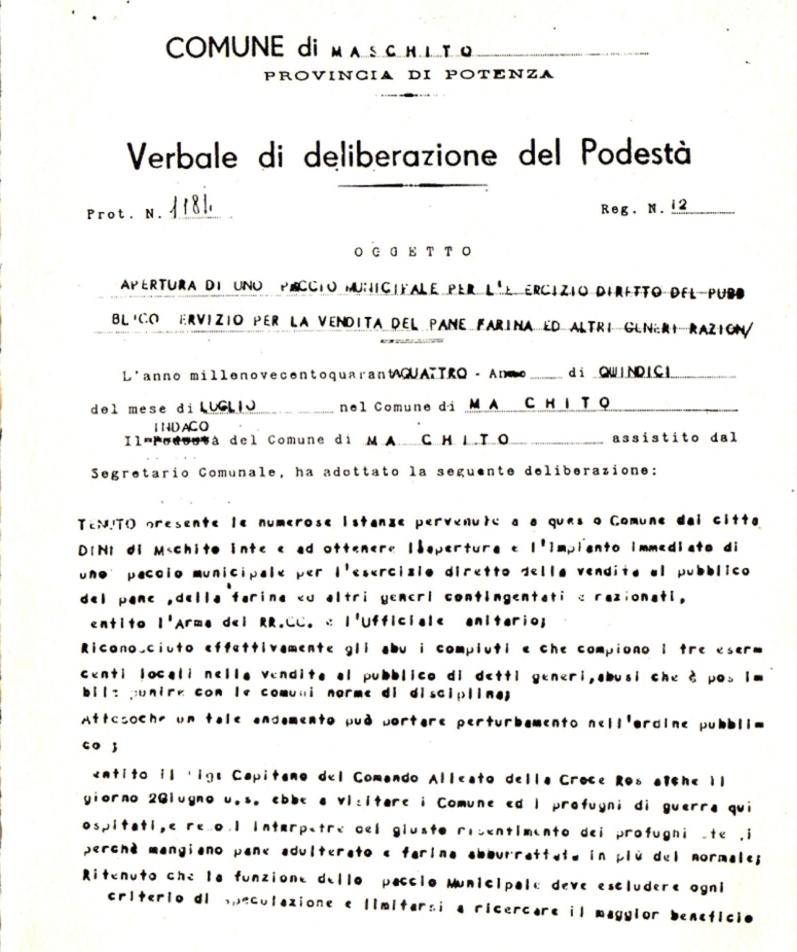
Republican bill on the regulation of food distribution

The government identified itself as a republican agrarian popular democracy which stood against the ideals of fascism and against monarchism. Despite having a defacto government, the republic is defined as "pre-political". The revolutionary leadership actively suppressed local fascist networks, preventing former party officials and collaborators from meeting or regrouping. This is defined by the type of italian resistance prevalent in Southern Italy at the time, which was characterized by being more grassroot-led.

The insurgent municipal government was headed by Domenico Bochicchio. During its existence, the administration distributed food and clothing to the local population of liberated areas. The republic took the redistribution dearly, in one anectode by executing one of Bochicchio's own collaborators who was accused of having appropriated several pairs of shoes intended for public distribution. Bochicchio personally executed him, presenting the act as an attempt to suppress corruption within the new administration. The administration reportedly discussed introducing a new system of taxation based on principles of fairness and social justice.

Because most of the peasant leaders were illiterate and unable to draft official documents or manage administrative paperwork, they appointed Giuseppe Guglielmucci as mayor, a local middle landowner whose family had been associated with the Socialist movement. His principal role was to record the decisions of the Giunta and carry out the administrative duties required to govern the municipality. The text further states that he remained mayor until 1946, despite the republic being dismantled in 1943.

According to contemporary accounts, the council held public meetings in which local residents participated in discussions and contributed to the decision-making process.
