= Banca Italiana per la Cina =

The Banca Italo-Cinese established in 1919, later dissolved and renamed Banca Italiana per la Cina in 1925, was the most important Italian financial intermediary in Asia until the outbreak of World War Two. The history of the bank is significantly intertwined with the development of the Sino-Italian political relations during the interwar period.

== The Banca Italo-Cinese ==
On October 19, 1919, Chinese shareholders represented by Xu Shiying, via the Chinese Ambassador in Italy, Wang Kouang Ky and Italian shareholders including delegates of Credito Italiano, Banca Unione and Credito Varesino met at the Chinese Embassy in Rome. They agreed to sign a convention to establish a new bank in China to be named the Banca Italo-Cinese (the Sino-Italian Bank). On November 8, 1919, a financial agreement was also signed by all the Italian shareholders of the new institution, who convened at the Credito Italiano main office in Milan to confirm the capital funding. The documents were signed by high profile Italian industrialists such as Grand Officer Carlo Orsi, managing director of Credito Italiano, Grand Officer Carlo Feltrinelli, managing director of Banca Unione (formerly Banca Feltrinelli) and Grand Officer Lionello Scelsi, a former Italian consul in Shanghai. The final deed of constitution was later registered by the Italian Consul Vincenzo Fileti at the Italian consulate in Tianjin on February 18, 1920.

The establishment of a new bank was an important step undertaken to improve the visibility of the Italian community in China, which until then was only marginally supported by the Italian governments. Colonial powers, such as Great Britain, France and Germany, offered ample diplomatic support and financial resources to their own entrepreneurs in those years. The Sino-Italian Bank joined international banks already based in China since the end of the Opium Wars, such as the British-Chartered Oriental Banking Corporation, established in Shanghai in 1848, the Chartered Bank of India, Australia and China (1857) and the Hongkong and Shanghai Banking Corporation, which began operating in 1865. The German Deutsch-Asiatische Bank joined them in May 1889 and the Russian-Chinese Bank (1896) and Banque de l'Indochine (1898) followed shortly after.

The capital structure of the Sino-Italian Bank was finally set up with the equal participation of the Italian (Series I shareholders, possessing 12,000 shares) and Chinese shareholders (Series C shareholders, also possessing a total of 12,000 shares). The subscribed Series I capital was initially 4 million lire oro (exchanged at 1 Lg. Pound = 25 Lire oro) and the Series C capital was 1.2 million Chinese dollars, which increased to 16 million lire oro and 4.8 million Chinese dollars, respectively (24 January 1920). Lionello Scelsi was the first appointed president of the bank, and the first managing directors were Egidio Marzoli, Ernesto De Negri, Carlo Feltrinelli (the Banca Unione managing director) and Carlo Orsi (the Credito Italiano managing director). The bank’s main purpose was the financial intermediation of Italian manufactured products and the import of raw materials from China, mainly leather and silk.

== The Banca Italiana per la Cina ==
The interests of the Chinese and Italian shareholders within the Sino-Italian Bank soon diverged. The bank’s management did not consider the Chinese market and entrepreneurs as commercial entities of importance due to the political uncertainties that characterized China in those years; in addition, local Chinese businesses were generating substantial financial losses for the bank. The Sino-Italian Bank was dissolved and renamed Banca Italiana per la Cina (Italian Bank for China) after the deliberation of the assembly held on 14 January 1924 in Tianjin. The new registration act was deposited at the Italian consulate of Shanghai on 19 August 1924 and bank’s legal domicile of the new bank was set in Shanghai. This time the share capital was entirely subscribed by Credito Italiano in gold valued at 1 million USD and divided into 10,000 shares. The Italian Bank for China’s main office was established at Kiukiang Road 16.

From the 1930s onwards, the Banca Italiana per la Cina became financial intermediary of important confidential transactions between the Italian and Chinese governments, such as the final solution of the question of the Boxer Indemnity, formally resolved with the signing of a memorandum in London by Italian Finance Minister Guido Jung (1876–1949) and Chinese Minister T. V. Soong (1894–1971) on 1 July 1933 and the settlement of the Skoda Loan, always in 1933, a long question that involved several European governments starting from 1912.

The bank continued to operate without restrictions until September 9, 1943, the day after the armistice signed by Italy with the Allies at Cassibile in Sicily, when Japanese soldiers seized the bank in Shanghai. They opened the main safe box, confiscating confidential documentation and the cash available, while the Chinese employees were dismissed. Most of the Italian managers and families were detained at the Presbyterian University in Weixian Internment Camp (in Shandong province), about 150 miles from Shanghai until the end of the war. The bank ceased the operation, despite a long negotiation with the Japanese authorities first and later with the Chinese government after the liberation. The detailed reports of these events are still kept in the archives of the bank today held at the Historical Archive of UniCredit Group in Milan.

== The End of the Banca Italiana per la Cina ==
After the war, in a letter sent on December 24, 1945 addressed to the board of directors in Milan, the bank’s management suggested the operation’s indefinite closure, explaining that the abolition of extraterritoriality privileges and the end of the concession system was a catastrophic event for foreigner interests and activities in China. Foreign banks lost the exclusivity of contracts with the public utility companies (e.g., electricity, transportation [trams], water distribution, telephones). They also lost the privilege to print banknotes and the right of confidentiality, which until then was guaranteed by foreign intermediaries. Said privilege no longer applied because of the strong supervision and interference of local authorities. The factor of competition indeed moved in favor of the Chinese banks, and the strong anti-Western and anticolonial sentiment of both the Chinese people and authorities made difficult to successfully pursue a foreign banking enterprise again.

On July 2, 1947, the assembly of the Credito Italiano deliberated the transfer of the legal domicile of the bank from Shanghai to Vaduz in Liechtenstein, under the denomination of Italianische Bank für China. Two years later, in 1949, the banking institution was renamed Società per Iniziative Finanziarie, Bancarie e Commerciali (SINIT), declaring the de facto end of the experience of the only wholly Italian-owned bank incorporated in China until today.

After that experience, a long time passed before an Italian bank began operating in China again. In 1996, the Banca di Roma was the first Italian bank to open a fully operational branch in Shanghai. Due to a complex and unexpected situation, the mother company later merged into UniCredit group in 2008; the latter coincidentally found itself leading business activities in China from the same city that it had left more than half a century earlier.
