= Giuseppe Bastianini =

Italian politician and diplomat (1899–1961)

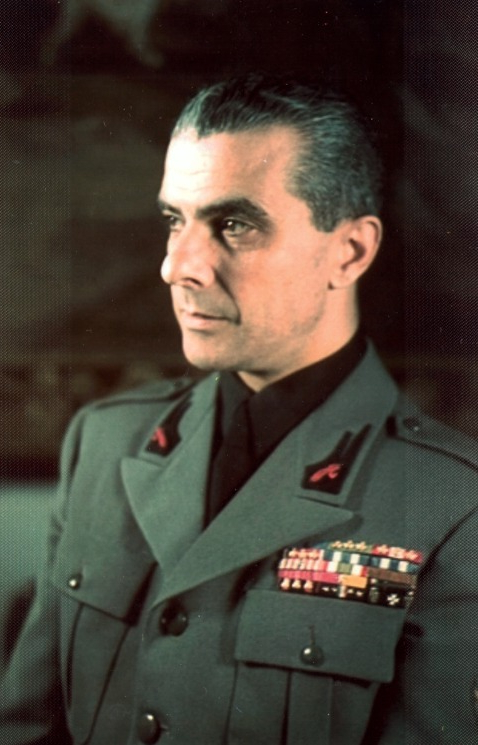

Governor of Dalmatia
- In office 7 June 1941 – 14 February 1943
- Preceded by: Athos Bartolucci
- Succeeded by: Francesco Giunta

Ambassador of Italy to United Kingdom
- In office 14 October 1939 – 10 June 1940
- Preceded by: Dino Grandi
- Succeeded by: Vacant

Ambassador of Italy to Poland
- In office 25 August 1932 – 11 June 1936
- Preceded by: Luigi Vannutelli Rey
- Succeeded by: Pietro Arone di Valentino

Member of Chamber of Fasces and Corporations
- In office 23 March 1939 – 5 August 1943
- Appointed by: Benito Mussolini

Member of Chamber of Deputies
- In office 24 May 1924 – 21 January 1929
- Constituency: Umbria

Personal details
- Born: 8 March 1899; Perugia, Kingdom of Italy
- Died: 17 December 1961 (aged 62); Milan, Italy
- Political party: PNF

Giuseppe Bastianini (8 March 1899 – 17 December 1961) was an Italian politician and diplomat. Initially associated with the hard-line elements of the fascist movements he later became a member of the dissident tendency.

== Early years ==
Bastianini was born in Perugia. At an early age he became a local fascist leader in Umbria where he garnered a reputation as a member of the hard-line intransigenti wing of the movement. Following the seizure of power Bastianini was appointed head of the Fasci Italiani all'Estero, a movement aimed at co-ordinating the activities of Italian fascists not currently living in Italy. He called on members to seek to diffuse proper Italian fascist ideas wherever they were living. This group gained a considerable following amongst Italian expatriates in the mid-1920s. Indeed, in 1925 he submitted a report to the Fascist Grand Council claiming to have groups in 40 countries worldwide.

Bastianini's activities brought him into conflict with Italian diplomats, who felt that his movement was overtly politicising their work. For his part Bastianini called for a complete reform of the diplomatic service, insisting that the only true Italians were also fascists and that therefore all diplomats should be convinced fascists. In the end Benito Mussolini pursued a middle ground by dismissing diplomats who had not declared for the National Fascist Party but also limiting the power of Bastianini's movement, which was taking on many of the functions of foreign affairs for itself, to ideological instruction, sport and charity work by restoring power to the Italian consuls. Bastianini resigned from his position as head of the Fasci Italiani all'Estero in late 1926.

== Diplomat ==
Somewhat inevitably following his drive to replace established diplomats with fascists Bastianini entered the diplomatic service himself. In 1927 he became Consul General in the Tangier International Zone. From 10 August 1928 to 14 November 1929 he was Italian envoy to Lisbon. In 1932 he became Italian ambassador to Poland and as a consequence he was one of those who helped to convince Mussolini to delay entry into the Second World War, knowing that Roman Catholic Poland was a country admired by many Italians. It was around this time that he also served as ambassador to the United Kingdom.

== Dalmatia ==
In 1941 Bastianini was appointed Governor of Dalmatia. In this role Bastianini oversaw the deportation of a number of the region's Jews, including many refugees fleeing the German-occupied areas of Yugoslavia, to concentration camps in Italy. Bastianini also established a policy of Italianisation, changing place names from Croatian to Italian, insisting that the press had to publish in Italian and bringing in a number of teachers from Italy to take lessons in Dalmatian schools. To those Croats who resented the changes he offered one piece of advice: emigrate.

Bastianini would spend the latter part of his period as governor in conflict with elements of the Italian military, in particular Generals Quirino Armellini and Mario Roatta. Armellini had concentrated his troops in Split, a move Bastianini feared would breed fear and resentment amongst the inhabitants. Roatta declared that the civilian administration must have no saw in troop deployment although he and Bastianini eventually reached a compromise whereby local authorities would be consulted before large scale troop movements. Bastianini also managed to secure the removal of Armellini, with whom he did not get along. Bastianini was recalled in January 1943 after a government reshuffle in Rome and was replaced as governor the following month by Francesco Giunta.

== Foreign Ministry ==
He was appointed undersecretary at the Foreign Ministry in February 1943, effectively replacing Galeazzo Ciano. Mussolini himself was the official Foreign Minister although his ill health and plethora of other roles meant that Bastianini effectively acted as minister. In his role he suggested two possible approaches that he felt could help to frustrate the Allied invasion of Italy, although neither seemed likely to occur. On the one hand he felt that Mussolini could get Adolf Hitler to negotiate a settlement with the Soviet Union and that German forces could then be redeployed in Italy, a tactic that he felt would force the western Allies to accept a compromise peace settlement. His other idea was for Mussolini to convince Hitler to allow Italy to leave the war altogether and declare neutrality. Both suggestions however had no hope of success as Hitler would never be convinced and Mussolini had no desire to attempt to convince him. Bastianini sold the notion of Mussolini as the man who could end the war to the governments of Bulgaria, Romania and Hungary as these minor Axis powers were also desperate for an exit as they were facing destruction at the hands of the advancing Red Army.

Mussolini's refusal to even attempt to reason with Hitler at the meeting held in Feltre with the German dictator on 19 July 1943 saw him challenged by Bastianini, Dino Alfieri and General Vittorio Ambrosio for his failure to try to get Italy out of the war. The incident damaged Mussolini's credibility and provided impetus to Dino Grandi, who soon launched an attempt to oust Mussolini. Bastianini was present at the Fascist Grand Council meeting held on July 25, 1943 at which the mood was decidedly anti-Mussolini as Grandi made his play. Although he was not overly enthusiastic about the plot Bastianini stated that Mussolini had ruined Italy through his inaction and so gave Grandi his support. Nonetheless he refused to follow the likes of Giuseppe Bottai in being openly condemnatory of Il Duce, preferring to continue to promote his aim of seeing Italy negotiating a separate peace as quickly as possible.

Bastianini died in Milan, aged 62.

== Notes ==
Political offices
Preceded by Athos Bartolucci	Governor of Dalmatia; 7 June 1941 – 14 February 1943	Succeeded by Francesco Giunta
