= List of ambassadors of Italy to Portugal =

Coordinates: 38.723926°N 9.136987°W

Ambassador of Italy to Portugal
- Emblem of Italy
- Incumbent; Carlo Formosa since January 4, 2020
- Inaugural holder: Domenico Pes di San Vittorio
- Formation: October 24, 1860

The Italian ambassador in Lisbon is the official representative of the Government in Rome to the Government of Portugal.

Since 1860 the governments in Rome and Lisbon maintain diplomatic relations.

== List of representatives ==
Diplomatic accreditation	Ambassador	Observations	List of prime ministers of Italy	List of prime ministers of Portugal	Term end
October 24, 1860	Domenico Pes di San Vittorio	Chargé d'affaires	Camillo Benso, Count of Cavour	Pedro V of Portugal	
July 19, 1863	Camillo Di Bella Caracciolo		Marco Minghetti	Luís I of Portugal	
January 2, 1864	Vittorio Sallier De La Tour		Alfonso Ferrero La Marmora	Luís I of Portugal	
June 4, 1864	Andrea Tagliacarne		Alfonso Ferrero La Marmora	Luís I of Portugal	
February 9, 1868	Filippo Oldoini		Urbano Rattazzi	Luís I of Portugal	
February 19, 1888	Luigi Avogadro di Collobiano Arboreo		Francesco Crispi	Luís I of Portugal	
November 19, 1892	Federico Costanzo Spinola		Giovanni Giolitti	Carlos I of Portugal	
October 30, 1896	Carlo Alberto Gerbaix de Sonnaz		Antonio Starabba, Marchese di Rudinì	Carlos I of Portugal	
July 17, 1903	Alessandro Guasco Di Bisio		Giovanni Giolitti	Carlos I of Portugal	
October 30, 1906	Raniero Paolucci di Calboli		Sidney Sonnino	Carlos I of Portugal	
February 16, 1913	Salvatore Contanarini		Giovanni Giolitti	Manuel José de Arriaga	
October 8, 1914	Ernesto Koch		Antonio Salandra	Manuel José de Arriaga	
June 28, 1916	Attilio Serra		Paolo Boselli	Bernardino Machado	
January 22, 1923	Livio Borghese		Benito Mussolini	Manuel Teixeira Gomes	
June 3, 1926	Carlo Galli (diplomat)	Member of Parliament sent extraordinary and minister plenipotentiary with L.C.	Benito Mussolini	José Mendes Cabeçadas Júnior	
August 10, 1928	Giuseppe Bastianini		Benito Mussolini	António Oscar de Fragoso Carmona	
November 14, 1929	Pietro Arone		Benito Mussolini	António de Oliveira Salazar	
October 27, 1932	Alberto Tuozzi		Benito Mussolini	António de Oliveira Salazar	
January 7, 1936	Francesco Giorgio Mameli		Benito Mussolini	António de Oliveira Salazar	
January 29, 1940	Renato Bova Scoppa		Benito Mussolini	António de Oliveira Salazar	
June 21, 1941	Francesco Fransoni		Benito Mussolini	António de Oliveira Salazar	
May 30, 1943	Renato Prunas		Pietro Badoglio	António de Oliveira Salazar	
September 28, 1944	Alberto Rossi Longhi		Pietro Badoglio	António de Oliveira Salazar	
November 30, 1946	Antonio Grossardi		Ferruccio Parri	António de Oliveira Salazar	
December 15, 1947	Pietro de Paolis	envoy	Ferruccio Parri	António de Oliveira Salazar	
January 22, 1952	Antonio Venturini	Ambassador	Ferruccio Parri	Francisco Craveiro Lopes	
May 5, 1956	Giuseppe Vitaliano Confalonieri		Antonio Segni	Francisco Craveiro Lopes	
October 22, 1958	Angelino Corrias		Amintore Fanfani	Américo Tomás	
October 8, 1961	Remigio Danilo Grillo		Fernando Tambroni	Américo Tomás	
November 2, 1964	Giuseppe Cerulli Irelli		Giovanni Leone	Américo Tomás	
March 26, 1971	Girolamo Messeri		Emilio Colombo	Américo Tomás	
July 10, 1975	Pier Luigi Alverà		Aldo Moro	Francisco da Costa Gomes	
October 9, 1979	Mario Magliano		Francesco Cossiga	António Ramalho Eanes	
January 28, 1983	Mario Magliano		Bettino Craxi	António Ramalho Eanes	
October 31, 1983	Enzo Merlot		Bettino Craxi	António Ramalho Eanes	
November 20, 1987	Giovanni Battistini		Amintore Fanfani	Mário Soares	
September 1, 1992	Ludovico Ortona		Giuliano Amato	Mário Soares	
June 24, 1995	Antonio Catalano di Melilli		Lamberto Dini	Mário Soares	
June 10, 1999	Michele Cosentino		Massimo D’Alema	Jorge Sampaio	
March 18, 2004	Emilio Barbarani		Silvio Berlusconi	Jorge Sampaio	
June 4, 2007	Luca Del Balzo di Presenzano		Romano Prodi	Aníbal Cavaco Silva	
January 2, 2011	Luca Del Balzo di Presenzano		Silvio Berlusconi	Aníbal Cavaco Silva	
October 1, 2011	Renato Varriale		Silvio Berlusconi	Aníbal Cavaco Silva	
September 7, 2015	Giuseppe Morabito (italian diplomat)		Matteo Renzi	Aníbal Cavaco Silva	
March 26, 2018	Uberto Vanni d’Archirafi		Paolo Gentiloni	Marcelo Rebelo de Sousa	
January 4, 2020	Carlo Formosa		Giuseppe Conte	Marcelo Rebelo de Sousa	
