= Adolfo Omodeo =

Italian historian and politician (1889–1946)

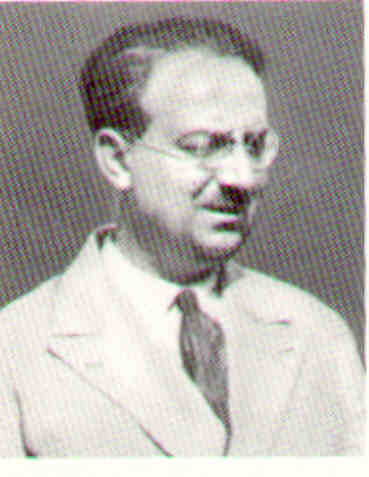

Minister of Public Education of the Kingdom of Italy
- In office 22 April 1944 – 8 June 1944
- Preceded by: Giovanni Cuomo
- Succeeded by: Guido De Ruggiero

Personal details
- Born: 18 August 1889 Palermo, Kingdom of Italy
- Died: 28 April 1946 (aged 56) Naples, Kingdom of Italy
- Party: Action Party

Adolfo Omodeo (Palermo, 18 August 1889 – Naples, 28 April 1946) was an Italian historian and politician, who served as Minister of Public Education of the Badoglio II Cabinet.

== Biography ==
He graduated in literature and philosophy at the University of Palermo in 1912, under the guidance of Giovanni Gentile, with a thesis on Jesus and the origins of Christianity, published in 1913. In 1914 he married his fellow student Eva Zona, and in 1915 he volunteered as an artillery officer in the First World War. In 1919 he began teaching at a high school, and in 1922 he became a professor of Ancient History at the University of Catania. In 1923 he moved to the University of Naples, where he held the chair of History of Christianity, a matter on which he published several books. He also published various works on the history of the Risorgimento, defending the theses of Cavour's liberalism against the critical alterations of the Risorgimento made by monarchist and fascist historians.

In 1925 he refrained from signing either Gentile's Manifesto of the Fascist Intellectuals or Benedetto Croce’s Manifesto of the Anti-Fascist Intellectuals, but in 1928 he broke with his old mentor Gentile (due to a dispute over the origin of Christianity and, later, to their opposing views on the Lateran Treaty) and approached Croce, with whom he had begun a intensive correspondence since 1921. In 1931, as a teacher, he took an oath of allegiance to Fascism imposed by the regime on penalty of losing his professorship and being excluded from teaching.

After the fall of Fascism on 25 July 1943 Omodeo was appointed rector of the University of Naples by the new Education Minister Leonardo Severi, and joined the Action Party. From April to June 1944 he was himself appointed Minister of National Education (which with him changed back to the pre-Fascist denomination of Minister of Public Education) in the second Badoglio government. Aftetwards, from February to April 1945, he volunteered in the Italian Liberation Corps "to set an example" (already in October 1943, as rector of the University of Naples, he had urged his students to follow the example "of the generation that had fought on the Karst and the Piave"). From 1945 to 1946 he was a member of the National Council. He was a member of the Accademia dei Lincei and co-director, together with his great friend Luigi Russo, of the literary magazine Belfagor. He died in 1946 after becoming ill with myelitis, possibly a consequence of malaria he had contracted on the Karst in 1917.
