= Carlo Favagrossa =

Italian general and politician

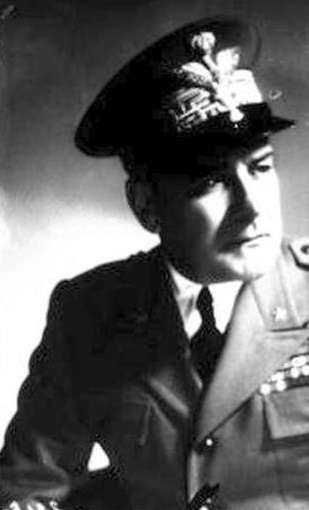
Carlo Favagrossa

Carlo Secillano Favagrossa (22 November 1888 – 22 March 1970), was an Italian general and politician, who was the Italian Under-Secretary for War Production during World War II.

Prior to the outbreak of hostilities, Favagrossa had calculated that Italy would not be prepared for war until October 1942. In 1946 he published a book, Perché perdemmo la guerra ("Why We Lost the War"), where he made public his estimates.

== Biography ==
Choosing a military career in the Royal Italian Army, Favagrossa entered the Turin Academy in 1906, leaving three years later as a second lieutenant in the Engineer Corps. With the rank of lieutenant he served during the Italo-Turkish War and then as a captain on the Italian front in World War I, in which he was awarded a silver medal and promotion to major for war merit (1917). After the war he combined his commitments in the army with a brief diplomatic career that took him to Cyrenaica, Czechoslovakia, and France. In 1930 he was promoted to colonel and in 1936 to brigadier general.

He took part in the Spanish Civil War as commander of the Volunteer Troops Corps (deployed in support of General Francisco Franco's Nationalists) and as chief of intelligence. In the same year he was appointed chief officer of the 1. Motorized Brigade, a post he held until 1937. In 1939, with the rank of general, he assumed command of the 16. Fossalta Division, and in the same year he was appointed, replacing Alfredo Dallolio, Commissioner General for War Production in Benito Mussolini's government.

At the outbreak of World War II, at the behest of the government he analyzed the state of Italian military preparedness, presenting on April 7, 1940 an assessment that Italy would not be ready to take the field until October 1942. However, Adolf Hitler's initial military successes with the Blitzkrieg strategy convinced the Duce that the conflict would be short-lived, so much so that he took the risk of entering it on June 10, 1940, more than two years earlier than the date suggested by Favagrossa. Italy's military unpreparedness and inadequacy, coupled with the prolongation of the conflict beyond Mussolini's expectations, was a primary cause of the subsequent defeat.

Undersecretary of State from May 23, 1940, he was put in charge of the General Commissariat for Liquid Fuels, Fuels and Lubricants from September 7, 1942. When on Feb. 6, 1943 Fabbriguerra (the name assigned to the former Commissariat for War Production) was elevated, with considerable delay, to the rank of Ministry of War Production, Favagrossa was called to lead it. Uninvolved in the plots that led to the fall of the Duce, he held the government post until Jan. 27, 1944, the day the First Badoglio government suppressed his department.

In the immediate aftermath of the war, he published the book Perché perdemmo la guerra (ed. Rizzoli, 1946) in which he made public the assessments he had made at the time. In fact, many of the documents Favagrossa appended to the text have still not been found in the various archives, and the various considerations about the lack of raw materials would have little effect on the “Italian military problem, which in the summer of 1940 and then again until late 1942 concerned the quality of means, not quantity.” For example, "the nickel used for the armor of the medium tank, between 1940 and 1942, dropped from 46 kg to 8. But already by May 8, 1941, the Army General Staff (report of Gen. Engineer L. Sarracino) had ascertained that the Italian tanks destroyed at Beda Fomm (Libya) in the previous February (and therefore built in 1940 with the largest amount of nickel), had succumbed to British shells due to elementary construction defects and carelessness in assembly." Retiring in 1954, he received various citations during his lifetime including the knighthood of the Order of Saints Maurice and Lazarus.
