= List of ambassadors of Italy to Serbia =

Coordinates: 44.803325°N 20.461757°E

Ambassador of Italy to Serbia
- Ambasciatore italiano in Serbia
- Emblem of Italy
- Incumbent; Carlo Lo Cascio since April 26, 2018
- Inaugural holder: Luigi Joannini Ceva di San Michele
- Formation: December 26, 1868

The Italian ambassador in Belgrade is the official representative of Italian Republic to the Serbia.

== List of representatives ==
Diplomatic accreditation	Ambassador	Observations	Prime Ministers of Italy	Heads of state of Serbia/Yugoslavia/ Serbia–Montenegro
Principality of Serbia
December 26, 1868	Luigi Joannini Ceva di San Michele		Urbano Rattazzi	Milan I of Serbia
September 7, 1879	Giuseppe Tornielli Brusati di Vergano	1889–1895: Ambassador of Italy to the United Kingdom; 1895–1908: Ambassador of Italy to France.	Benedetto Cairoli	Milan I of Serbia
September 10, 1881	Antonio Tosi		Agostino Depretis	Milan I of Serbia
Kingdom of Serbia
December 31, 1883	Vittorio Sallier de La Tour		Agostino Depretis	Milan I of Serbia
December 17, 1885	Alessandro Zannini		Agostino Depretis	Milan I of Serbia
January 30, 1887	Francesco Galvagna	Chargé d'affaires of Italy to Austria-Hungary in 1882	Francesco Crispi	Milan I of Serbia
August 19, 1895	Giuseppe Avarna	1903–1914 Ambassador of Italy to Austria-Hungary	Francesco Crispi	Alexander I of Serbia
November 27, 1898	Edmondo Mayor de Planches		Luigi Pelloux	Alexander I of Serbia
February 16, 1902	Roberto Magliano di Villar San Marco	Ambassador of Italy to Switzerland in 1908	Giuseppe Zanardelli	Alexander I of Serbia
July 27, 1903	Roberto Magliano di Villar San Marco		Giovanni Giolitti	Peter I of Serbia
July 16, 1904	Alessandro Guiccioli		Giovanni Giolitti	Peter I of Serbia
July 23, 1908	Carlo Baroli	1906 Ambassador to Tokyo	Sidney Sonnino	Peter I of Serbia
September 2, 1912	Nicola Squitti di Palermitti	First consul of Italy in Trieste; ambassador of Italy to Montenegro	Giovanni Giolitti	Peter I of Serbia
June 28, 1916	Carlo Sforza		Paolo Boselli	Peter I of Serbia
December 1, 1918			Francesco Saverio Nitti	Peter I of Serbia
Kingdom of Serbs, Croats, and Slovenes
November 24, 1920	Gaetano Manzoni	Ambassador of Italy to France in 1929	Francesco Saverio Nitti	Peter I of Serbs, Croats, and Slovenes
December 16, 1922	Lazzaro Negrotto Cambiaso		Benito Mussolini	Alexander I of Serbs, Croats, and Slovenes
February 24, 1924	Alessandro Bodrero		Benito Mussolini	Alexander I of Serbs, Croats, and Slovenes
June 3, 1928	Carlo Galli		Benito Mussolini	Alexander I of Serbs, Croats, and Slovenes
Kingdom of Yugoslavia
December 6, 1934	Guido Viola di Campalto	Ambassador of Italy to Spain	Benito Mussolini	Peter II of Yugoslavia
August 7, 1936	Mario Indelli	Ambassador of Italy to Japan	Benito Mussolini	Peter II of Yugoslavia
January 29, 1940	Francesco Giorgio Mameli		Benito Mussolini	Peter II of Yugoslavia
Federal People's Republic of Yugoslavia
February 26, 1952	Enrico Martino (1907-1981)		Ferruccio Parri	Ivan Ribar
February 25, 1953	Francesco Paolo Vanni D'Archirafi	Permanent Representative of Italy to the European Office of Nations	Giuseppe Pella	Josip Broz Tito
October 12, 1954	Francesco Paolo Vanni D'Archirafi		Amintore Fanfani	Josip Broz Tito
February 4, 1955	Gastone Guidotti	1958–1961: Ambassador of Italy to Austria	Antonio Segni	Josip Broz Tito
October 12, 1958	Francesco Cavalleti di Oliveto Sabino	Ambassador of Italy to Spain	Fernando Tambroni	Josip Broz Tito
January 15, 1960	Alberto Berio		Fernando Tambroni	Josip Broz Tito
Socialist Federal Republic of Yugoslavia
April 20, 1964	Roberto Ducci		Giovanni Leone	Josip Broz Tito
October 16, 1967	Folco Trabalza	1971–1975: Ambassador of Italy to China	Giovanni Leone	Josip Broz Tito
June 10, 1971	Giuseppe Walter Maccotta		Emilio Colombo	Josip Broz Tito
December 23, 1975	Giuseppe Walter Maccotta		Aldo Moro	Josip Broz Tito
May 24, 1977	Alberto Cavaglieri		Giulio Andreotti	Josip Broz Tito
September 4, 1979	Alberto Cavaglieri		Francesco Cossiga	Josip Broz Tito
October 16, 1980	Pietro Calamia		Francesco Cossiga	Lazar Koliševski
February 13, 1984	Massimo Castaldo		Bettino Craxi	Veselin Đuranović
March 13, 1989	Sergio Vento		Giulio Andreotti	Janez Drnovšek
August 15, 1991	Sergio Vento		Giulio Andreotti	Stjepan Mesić
Federal Republic of Yugoslavia
June 3, 1996	Francesco Bascone		Romano Prodi	Zoran Lilić
July 5, 1997	Riccardo Sessa		Romano Prodi	Zoran Lilić
June 9, 2000	Giovanni Caracciolo Di Vietri		Giuliano Amato	Slobodan Milošević
State Union of Serbia and Montenegro
February 4, 2003	Giovanni Caracciolo Di Vietri		Silvio Berlusconi	Vojislav Koštunica
March 18, 2004	Antonio Zanardi Landi		Silvio Berlusconi	Svetozar Marović
January 3, 2006	Alessandro Merola		Romano Prodi	Svetozar Marović
Republic of Serbia
June 14, 2006	Alessandro Merola		Romano Prodi	Boris Tadić
June 5, 2009	Armando Varricchio		Silvio Berlusconi	Boris Tadić
June 3, 2013	Giuseppe Manzo		Enrico Letta	Tomislav Nikolić
April 26, 2018	Carlo Lo Cascio		Paolo Gentiloni	Aleksandar Vučić

== See also ==
- Italy–Serbia relations
- Foreign relations of Italy
