= Francesco Giunta =

Italian politician (1887–1971)

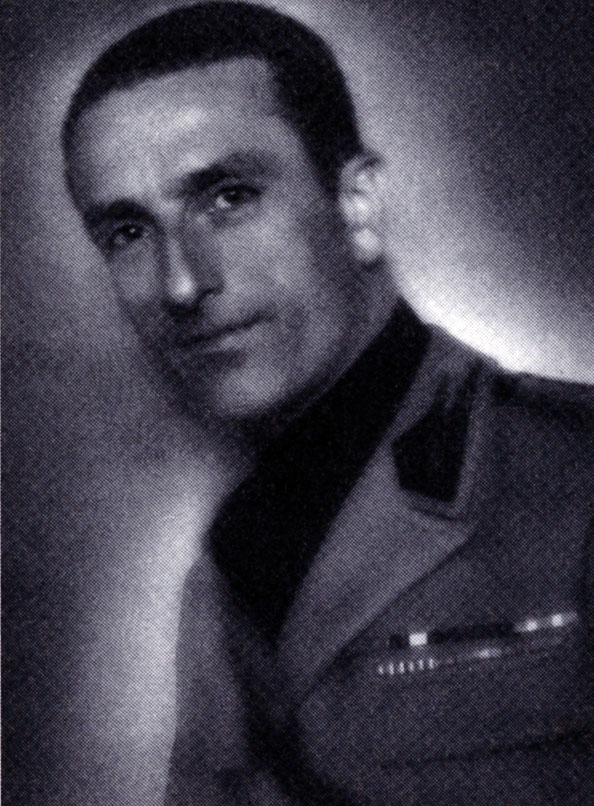
Francesco Giunta

Francesco Giunta (21 March 1887 – 8 June 1971) was an Italian Fascist politician. A leading figure in the early years of fascism, he helped to build the movement in several regions of the country and was particularly active in Trieste. During the Second World War he became notorious for his role in occupied Yugoslavia.

== Early career ==
Born in the Tuscan town of San Piero a Sieve, into an upper-middle-class family of Sicilian origin, Giunta started his career as a lawyer, having studied law and philosophy at university. He served as a machine gun captain in World War I, having joined the army in 1915. After the war he was involved in the establishment of the ex-service group Associazione Nazionale dei Combattenti, as well as the more overtly political Alleanza di Difesa Cittadina, an anti-socialist group with a strong military bent that was involved in battles with leftists.

An early member of the Italian fascist movement, Giunta was the leader of fascio in Florence before in 1920 being sent to the Julian March (Venezia Giulia) to aid Professor Ruggero Conforto in establishing the fascist movement in the region. Having garnered a reputation as a good organiser, he was subsequently sent to Trieste that same year to work under Gabriele D'Annunzio. Under the direction of D'Annunzio he became the propaganda chief in Fiume and a deputy for the city from 1921 to 1939. He worked with Benito Mussolini to set up a number of Fascist squads that attacked a group of allegedly separatist Slovenes in northern Istria. As a Fascist leader (ras) of Trieste, he built up an early mass support base for the Fascist movement. In July 1920, he led the squad that burned down the Narodni dom, the community centre of the Slovenes in Trieste. Giunta gained fame in March 1922 when he followed the example of D'Annunzio by staging a coup in the Free State of Fiume with 2000 followers. This laid the foundations for the official Italian takeover in 1924.

In October 1922, he commanded the Fascists from the Julian March in the March on Rome. His leading position in the early years of fascism came despite his Freemasonry, a movement to which Mussolini was bitterly opposed.

== Under Mussolini's government ==
He became national secretary of the National Fascist Party in succession to Michele Bianchi in 1923 and oversaw the move towards an increasingly diminished role for the party rank and file as Mussolini consolidated his government. He also sought to increase party discipline and was behind a brutal physical attack on Cesare Forni, a leading dissident within the Fascist movement.

Replaced by Roberto Farinacci the following year, Giunta settled into an undersecretary's role in the cabinet office. In this role he was pivotal in signalling one of the future intentions of Italian foreign policy when he stated in an April 1933 visit to Malta that he was on Italian soil and that the future of the island lay in complete union with Italy. He also acted as vice-president of the Chamber of Deputies from 1924. In this role, he was declared immune from prosecution in March 1925 when magistrates in Milan attempted to charge him over the attack on Forni.

== Dalmatia ==
On 11 February 1943, he succeeded Giuseppe Bastianini as the Governor of Dalmatia. A fervent anti-Yugoslav since the times of his activity in the South Slav-inhabited Julian March, Giunta brought a number of his old colleagues from Trieste with him. His regime became noted for its brutality against the local Croat population and its fierce repression of the Yugoslav partisan movement in the area.

He subsequently adhered to the new Italian Social Republic, although on a personal level he was largely unenthusiastic about the regime and held only minor posts, such as head of the press office of the Ministry of Defence.

== Post-war activity ==
After World War II, Yugoslavia demanded the extradition of Giunta, so that he could be tried for war crimes committed in Yugoslavia. Both Italy and the Allies rejected the demand.

The Florentine squadrist was placed under investigation in the 1947 Dumini trial, which investigated the murder of Giacomo Matteotti, after being implicated in one of Cesare Rossi’s memorial statements. He was not charged in relation to this but indicted on further, unrelated charges, the same year. Giunta settled in Rome, where he died in 1971.

Political offices
Preceded by Giuseppe Bastianini	Governor of Dalmatia; 14 February 1943 – 10 September 1943	Succeeded by Office abolished
Party political offices
Preceded by Triumvirate	Secretary of the National Fascist Party; 15 October 1923 – 22 April 1924	Succeeded by Quadrumvirate
