= Athos Bartolucci =

Italian Fascist politician and journalist (1902–1992)

Federal Secretary of the National Fascist Party for Dalmatia
- In office 21 May 1934 – 29 July 1942
- Preceded by: Giuseppe D'Aloja
- Succeeded by: Paolo Quarantotto
- Civil Commissioner for occupied Dalmatia
- In office 16 April 1941 – 6 June 1941
- Preceded by: Office created
- Succeeded by: Giuseppe Bastianini (as Governor of Dalmatia)

Personal details
- Born: 28 November 1902 Ferrara, Kingdom of Italy
- Died: 1992 (aged 90) Framura, Italy
- Party: National Fascist Party

Military service
- Allegiance: Kingdom of Italy
- Branch/service: Regia Aeronautica
- Rank: Lieutenant
- Battles/wars: Second Italo-Ethiopian War
- Awards: Bronze Medal of Military Valor

Athos Bartolucci (Ferrara, 28 October 1902 – Framura, 1992) was an Italian Fascist politician and journalist, who served as federal secretary of the National Fascist Party in Dalmatia from 1934 to 1942 and as Civilian Commissioner for occupied Dalmatia during World War II.

== Biography ==
At age seventeen, he participated in Gabriele D'Annunzio's occupation of Fiume and later of Zara.

From 1923 to 1928, he studied Diplomatic and Consular Sciences at the Ca' Foscari University of Venice, becoming head of its Gruppo Universitario Fascista. On 21 May 1934, he was appointed Federal Secretary of the National Fascist Party for Dalmatia (with seat in Zara), a post he held till 29 July 1942.

In 1935-1936 he volunteered in the Royal Italian Air Force during the Second Italo-Ethiopian War, with the rank of Lieutenant, receiving a Bronze Medal of Military Valor for having successfully repelled an ambush against the supply column he was leading near Termaber Pass in May 1936.

In 1939, he became a member of the Chamber of Fasces and Corporations. On 16 April 1941, after the Axis invasion of Yugoslavia, he was appointed Civil Commissioner for occupied Dalmatia by Benito Mussolini; he held this post until 6 June 1941, when the Governatorate of Dalmatia was established, with Giuseppe Bastianini as governor. Bartolucci then became Inspector of the Fascist Party for Dalmatia.

After World War II, he was wanted by Yugoslavia for war crimes, but was acquitted of all charges. He continued his career, holding various posts within the Trust Territory of Somaliland, and becoming in 1961 president of the Chamber of Commerce of Somalia.

He died in 1992.
