= Gaetano Azzariti =

Italian jurist and politician (1881–1961)

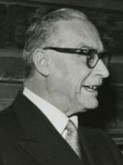
- Azzariti in 1957

Minister of Justice of the Kingdom of Italy
- In office 28 July 1943 – 15 February 1944
- Preceded by: Alfredo De Marsico
- Succeeded by: Ettore Casati
- President of the Constitutional Court
- In office 6 April 1957 – 5 January 1961
- Preceded by: Enrico De Nicola
- Succeeded by: Giuseppe Cappi
- President of the Tribunal for the Race
- In office November 1939 – June 1943
- Preceded by: Office established
- Succeeded by: Office abolished

Personal details
- Born: 26 March 1881 Naples, Kingdom of Italy
- Died: 5 January 1961 (aged 79) Rome, Italy
- Awards: Order of Merit of the Italian Republic; Order of Merit of the Federal Republic of Germany

Gaetano Azzariti (26 March 1881 – 5 January 1961) was an Italian jurist and politician, who headed the Commission on Race under the Fascist regime, and served as Minister of Justice of Pietro Badoglio's government after the fall of the Italian fascist regime. After the war, from 1957 to 1961, he was president of the Constitutional Court of Italy.

== Early life and career ==
Azzariti was born in Naples into a family of Apulian origins; both his father and two of his brothers (including Francesco Saverio Azzariti, senator of the Kingdom of Italy) were magistrates. He graduated in law from the University of Naples in 1901. A member of the Neapolitan school of jurisprudence, he was close to Lodovico Mortara and Vittorio Scialoja. In 1906, at age twenty-five, he became secretary of the commission for the examination of codes for the Italian Eritrea. In 1908, he was a member of the commission for the reform of the codes, set up by Vittorio Emanuele Orlando, and in 1909 became private secretary of the Minister of Grace and Justice Vittorio Scialoja. In 1918, after the First World War, he was appointed secretary of the Postwar Commission.

== Fascist regime ==
Much of his work was carried out at the Legislative Office of the Ministry of Grace and Justice, for which Azzariti was responsible almost without interruption from 1927 until 1949, except for the period between 25 July 1943 and 4 June 1944. Within this ministry, he rose in rank, becoming councilor of the Court of Appeal in 1923, councilor of the Court of Cassation in 1928, and section president of the Court of Appeal in 1931. He played an important role in the drafting of the texts of the civil code and the civil procedure code of 1942, of the bankruptcy law of 1942, and of the law on the judicial system of 1940. In addition to coordinating the related preparatory work, he was part of some of the commissions in charge of the material drafting of the norms and drafting parts of the accompanying ministerial reports. In 1924, he was also appointed first instance judge for the criminal cases of the Republic of San Marino.

A convinced antisemite, Azzariti stated in a speech of 28 March 1942 that "the dominant egalitarianism ... regardless of age, sex, religion or race", was no longer "a kind of indisputable dogma", and that with fascism "it is now shelved in the attic", and that "racial diversity is an insuperable obstacle to the establishment of personal relationships, from which biological or psychic alterations to the purity of our people may arise." In 1938. he adhered to the Manifesto of Race, which played a significant role in the promulgation of the Italian racial laws, and became president of a commission, the Tribunal for the Race, established at the Directorate General for Demography and Race of the Ministry of the Interior. (Note: See "Norme integrative del R. decreto-legge 17 novembre 1938-XVII, n. 1728, sulla difesa della razza italiana". Radies (in Italian). Università degli Studi di Catania – Dipartimento di Giurisprudenza. October 2008. Archived from the original on 8 April 2016.) The commission could declare "non-belonging to the Jewish race even in discrepancy with the results of the civil status documents", and accepted 104 of the 143 requests submitted in this regard. (Note: See "Norme integrative del Regio decreto legge 17 novembre 1938-XVII, n. 1728, sulla difesa della razza italiana". Olokaustos (in Italian). 2004. Archived from the original on 24 September 2015.) Azzariti would later claim that he had merely "turned into law the wishes of Mussolini" and that as president of the Tribunal for the Race he had "softened" the implementation of the racial laws.

== Later life and career ==
On 25 July 1943, following the fall of Fascism, Azzariti was appointed Minister of Justice in the first Badoglio government. When the government fled to Brindisi after the armistice of Cassibile, Azzariti remained in Rome, where he found shelter in a convent during the German occupation. After the liberation of Rome in June 1944, he resumed service at the legislative office of the Ministry of Grace and Justice. On 22 December 1944, the Italian Social Republic ordered his retirement, which had no effect as he was in Allied-controlled territory.

From June 1945 to July 1946, Azzariti collaborated with the Minister of Justice Palmiro Togliatti, after which he was a member of the two commissions for the reorganization of the state and for the reform of the administration (Forti Commissions), within the ministry for the Constituent Assembly of Italy. He was later appointed president of the Higher Court for Public Waters until he was retired for having reached the age limit in 1951. On 3 December 1955, he was appointed constitutional judge by the Italian Republic president Giovanni Gronchi. He was the rapporteur of the sentence that affirmed the competence of the Court to judge the constitutional legitimacy of the rules that came into force before the Italian Republican Constitution, and on 6 April 1957 became president of the Court on until 5 January 1961, the day of his death in Rome.

In 1970, his native Naples had dedicated a street to him. In May 2015, the city council unanimously approved a motion to rename the street after Luciana Pacifici, a Jewish child from Naples who was murdered in the Holocaust, becoming Naples' youngest victim of the Shoah. In March 2019, the Municipality of Naples decided the removal of the plaque affixed to the facade of the building where Azzariti had been born.

== Works ==
Among his main works are Dell'esercizio delle azioni commerciali e della loro durata (1933, with Lodovico Mortara) and Problemi attuali di diritto costituzionale (1952).

== Honours ==
- Italy: Knight Grand Cross of the Order of Merit of the Italian Republic, 2 June 1953.

== Bibliography ==
- D'Amico, Marilisa; De Francesco, Antonino; Siccardi, Cecilia, eds. (20 December 2019). L'Italia ai tempi del ventennio fascista. A ottant'anni dalle leggi ebraiche: tra storia e diritto (PDF) (in Italian). Milan: FrancoAngeli. ISBN 978-88-35-10000-3 – via AIR Unimi.
