= Oreste Bonomi =

Italian politician (1902–1983)

Minister for Exchanges and Currencies of the Kingdom of Italy
- In office 6 February 1943 – 25 July 1943
- Preceded by: Raffaello Riccardi
- Succeeded by: Giovanni Acanfora
- Member of the Chamber of Deputies of the Kingdom of Italy
- In office 28 April 1934 – 2 March 1939
- Member of the Chamber of Fasces and Corporations
- In office 23 March 1939 – 5 August 1943

Personal details
- Born: 15 July 1902 Milan, Kingdom of Italy
- Died: 26 April 1983 (aged 80) Rome, Italy
- Party: National Fascist Party
- Civilian awards: Order of the Crown of Italy; Colonial Order of the Star of Italy; Order of Saints Maurice and Lazarus; Order of the German Eagle; Order of Leopold; Order of the Holy Sepulchre; Legion of Honour

Military service
- Allegiance: Kingdom of Italy
- Branch/service: Regia Aeronautica
- Rank: Captain
- Battles/wars: Second Italo-Ethiopian War; Battle of Shire; Battle of Tembien; Battle of Amba Aradam; World War II; North African campaign; Battle of the Mediterranean
- Military awards: Silver Medal of Military Valor; Bronze Medal of Military Valor; War Merit Cross

Oreste Bonomi (Milan, 15 July 1902 – Rome, 26 April 1983) was an Italian Fascist politician, who served as the last Minister for Exchanges and Currencies of the Mussolini Cabinet from February to July 1943.

== Biography ==
The son of Giovanni Bonomi and Angela Penagini, he worked as a merchant and accountant, and was President of the national federation of traders. In the early 1920s he was a squadrista in Milan and participated in the march on Rome. In 1934 he was elected to the Italian Chamber of Deputies with the National Fascist Party and in 1939 he became a member of the Chamber of Fasces and Corporations. Among his offices were that of Director General of Tourism and Deputy Commissioner for the 1942 World Exhibition in Rome. During the Second Italo-Ethiopian War he flew as a bomber pilot for the Regia Aeronautica, participating in the battles of Shire, Tembien and Amba Aradam, as well as in a demonstrative flight over Addis Ababa, and being awarded a Silver Medal of Military Valor. After the outbreak of the Second World War, he again participated in bombing missions in North Africa and the Mediterranean, earning a Bronze Medal of Military Valor. From 6 February to 25 July 1943 he was Minister of Exchanges and Currencies during the last phase of the Mussolini Cabinet. After the fall of the Fascist regime and the German occupation of Italy he fled to Switzerland.
