= Palazzo Jung, Palermo =

Historical building in Palermo, Italy

Coordinates: 38.11301°N 13.37135°E

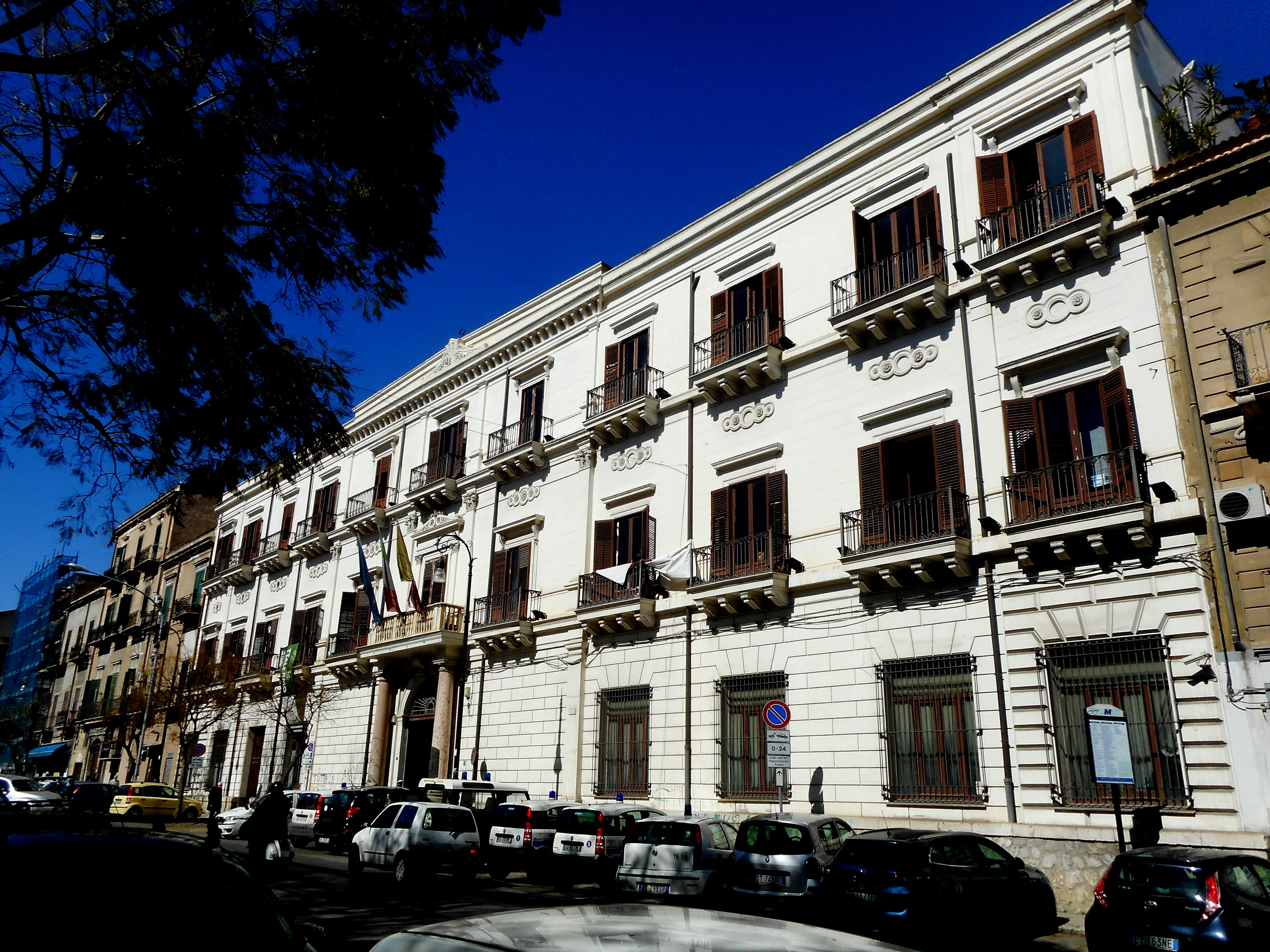

The Palazzo Jung is a Neoclassical-style palace located on Via Lincoln, in front of the Orto Botanico of Palermo, in the city of Palermo, region of Sicily, Italy.

== History ==
The three-story palace was begun in the late 18th century by the family of the newly created Baron of Verbumcaudo. The building was erected on a site cleared during the destruction of the city walls and bastions in the late 18th-century. For part of the late 19th century, it was occupied by the Pensione Tersenghi. In 1921, it was purchased by the Jung family, who were successful Jewish merchants from Switzerland: the three brothers Mario, Guido, and Ugo, who started a company exporting dried fruits, citrus products, and spices. The property suffered damage from the bombardments of World War II. The descendants of the Jung family owned the property until 1958.

The property was poorly conserved, when in the late 20th century it was acquired by the provincial government and converted into the Istituto Alberghiero di Stato. The interiors have elegant neoclassical frescoes. The gardens were also rehabilitated.

One of the prominent descendants of the Jung brothers was Guido Jung (1876–1949), an avid member of the fascist party, minister of finance for Mussolini and briefly in the government of Badoglio, and coronel in the Italian army in Ethiopia. Despite having converted to Catholicism in 1935, Guido was dismissed from the army in 1939 due to Italian racial laws.
