= Guido Rocco =

Italian politician and diplomat

Minister of Popular Culture of the Kingdom of Italy
- In office 26 July 1943 – 15 August 1943
- Preceded by: Gaetano Polverelli
- Succeeded by: Carlo Galli

Personal details
- Born: 26 November 1886 Naples, Kingdom of Italy
- Died: 2 May 1959 (aged 72)
- Awards: Order of the White Lion

Guido Rocco (Naples, 26 November 1886 – 2 May 1959) was an Italian diplomat and politician, who served as Minister of Popular Culture of the Kingdom of Italy of the Badoglio I Cabinet, the first after the fall of the Fascist regime, and well as Italian ambassador to Turkey and Czechoslovakia.

== Biography ==
After graduating in law in 1909, he started his diplomatic career in 1912, initially serving as consular attaché, then as vice-consul and later as consul in various Italian consulates. He later became a member of the Italian delegation to the League of Nations, and legation councilor in Paris and Berlin, and attended the London Naval Conference and the Conference for the Reduction and Limitation of Armaments. He was then plenipotentiary minister in Prague from 25 August 1932 to 26 July 1935, protagonist of various missions abroad and from 1936 general director for foreign press services at the Ministry of Press and Propaganda and then at the Ministry of Popular Culture. On 26 July 1943 he was appointed Minister of Popular Culture in the first Badoglio government. His main task was to keep the censorship of the press unchanged, and he carried out his duty to the point that the directors of the main Roman newspapers sent a letter of protest directly to Marshal Badoglio on 11 August. On 15 August 1943 Badoglio decided to replace Rocco with Carlo Galli. On 6 September 1943 Rocco was appointed ambassador to Turkey; among his tasks in this role, after the armistice of Cassibile, was that of establishing the first official contacts between Italy and the Soviet Union from the beginning of the hostilities, contacts that led shortly thereafter to mutual official recognition.
