= Ettore Casati =

Italian jurist

Minister of Justice of the Kingdom of Italy
- In office 15 February 1944 – 17 April 1944
- Preceded by: Gaetano Azzariti
- Succeeded by: Vincenzo Arangio-Ruiz

President of the Supreme Court of Cassation
- In office 6 November 1941 – 8 August 1945
- Preceded by: Mariano D'Amelio
- Succeeded by: Giuseppe Pagano

Personal details
- Born: 24 March 1873 Chiavenna, Kingdom of Italy
- Died: 8 August 1945 (aged 72) Rome, Italy

Ettore Casati (Chiavenna, 24 March 1873 – Rome, 8 August 1945) was an Italian jurist and magistrate, who served as Minister of Justice of the Badoglio I Cabinet from February to April 1944, and as President of the Supreme Court of Cassation from 1941 to 1945.

== Biography ==
After graduating in law from the University of Milan, he was appointed councilor and later judge at the Tribunal of Milan, and from 6 November 1941 he was president of the Supreme Court of Cassation. After the armistice of Cassibile he refused to collaborate with the Italian Social Republic and crossed the frontline, fleeing to Allied-controlled southern Italy, where he became president of the Commission on the illicit enrichments of the Fascist leaders and on 15 February 1944 he was appointed Minister of Justice of the Badoglio I Cabinet, a post he held until 17 April 1944. On 27 July 1944 he was appointed president of the High Court of Justice for crimes committed by members of the Fascist government; he signed the decree for the epuration of Fascist officials. He died in 1945, shortly after the end of the war; his Manual of Italian Civil Law was published posthumously in 1947.
