= Cesare Nava =

Italian engineer and politician (1861–1933)

Cesare Nava OCI
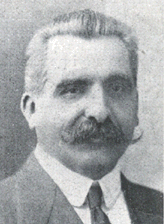

Minister of National Economy
- In office 1 July 1924 – 10 July 1925
- Prime Minister: Benito Mussolini
- Preceded by: Orso Mario Corbino
- Succeeded by: Giuseppe Belluzzo

Minister for the Lands Freed from the Enemy
- In office 23 June 1919 – 13 March 1920
- Prime Minister: Francesco Saverio Nitti

Personal details
- Born: 7 October 1861 Milan, Kingdom of Italy
- Died: 27 November 1933 (aged 72) Milan, Kingdom of Italy
- Party: Italian People's Party (1919–1924); National Fascist Party (1929–1933)
- Spouses: Giuseppa Prina; Maria Cesa Bianchi
- Children: 2
- Parents: Leonardo Nava (father); Maria Bettali (mother)
- Education: Milan Polytechnic
- Occupation: Engineer

Cesare Nava (1861–1933) was an Italian engineer and politician who served as the minister of national economy between 1924 and 1925 in the cabinet of Benito Mussolini.

== Early life and education ==
Nava was born in Milan on 7 October 1861 to Leonardo, a merchant, and Maria Bettali. Coming from a family of the Milanese petty bourgeoisie, he first attended the Regio Istituto Tecnico Santa Marta where he received a physical-mathematical license in 1879. Then he attended the Higher Technical Institute of Milan, Milan Polytechnic, and obtained a degree in engineering in 1884.

== Career ==
In 1884 Nava was named the president of a local Catholic youth organization named Lombard Catholic movement attached to the Italian Catholic Youth Society. In 1886 he participated in the establishment of the newspaper La Lega lombarda which called for the political participation of Catholics alongside the moderates Nava joined the city council of Milan in 1893 and was then elected to its general administration in 1895. He was elected director of the Banco Ambrosiano on 22 December 1897, replacing Giuseppe Tovini, its founder and president, in the post. On 18 January 1898, his term was extended, and he held the post until 1933.

Nava was re-elected to the city council of Milan in 1908. In the following year he ran for the Chamber of Deputies and won the seat. He was elected a second time to the Chamber in 1913. In October 1917, he and other Catholic deputies withdrew their support for the government led by Prime Minister Paolo Boselli due to the statements of the Foreign Minister Sidney Sonnino in regard to the liquidation of the papal note dated 1 August calling for the cessation of World War I.

In May 1918, he was appointed by Prime Minister Vittorio Emanuele Orlando first as undersecretary and then general commissioner for the Ministry of Arms and Ammunition, which he held until 15 September. Following World War I, he joined the Italian People's Party. On 23 June 1919, Nava was made the minister for the lands freed from the enemy in the cabinet led by Francesco Saverio Nitti. In November 1919, Nava was again elected to the Chamber of Deputies on the PPI list representing Milan. Nava's term as the minister for the lands freed from the enemy ended on 13 March 1920.

Nava became a senator on 8 June 1921. He left the Italian People's Party in April 1924. He was appointed minister of national economy to the cabinet of Benito Mussolini on 1 July 1924. Nava replaced Orso Mario Corbino in the post. Nava's tenure was brief and lasted until 10 July 1925 when Mussolini requested his and Alberto De Stefani's resignations. Giuseppe Belluzzo replaced Nava as minister of national economy.

In 1929 he joined the National Fascist Party and continued to serve at the Senate. Following his retirement from politics Nava became president of the Milanese Union, a pro-fascist Catholic association adhering to the Italian National Center. On 9 October 1933 he resigned from the presidency of the Fabbrica del duomo in Milan for health reasons.

== Personal life and death ==
Widowed by his first wife, Giuseppa Prina, on 27 November 1895, Nava married Maria Cesa Bianchi, daughter of the well-known architect Paolo Bianchi. He had two children. Nava died in Milan on 27 November 1933.

=== Awards ===
Nava was awarded numerous honours, including the Order of the Crown of Italy (four times) and the Order of Saints Maurice and Lazarus (two times).
