= Pietro Fedele =

Italian Fascist politician (1873–1943)

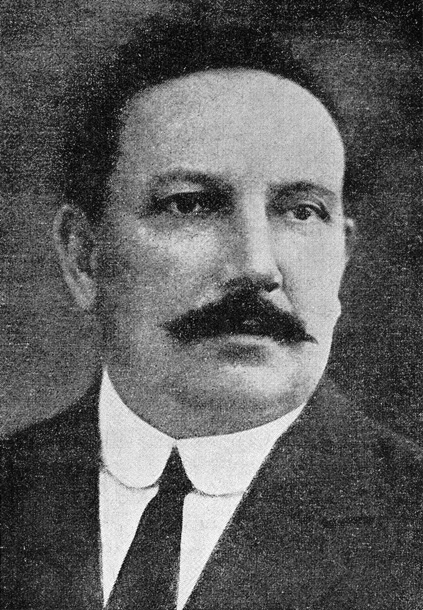

Minister of Public Education of the Kingdom of Italy
- In office 5 January 1925 – 9 July 1928
- Preceded by: Alessandro Casati
- Succeeded by: Giuseppe Belluzzo

Member of the Senate of the Kingdom of Italy
- In office 22 December 1928 – 5 August 1943

Member of the Chamber of Deputies of the Kingdom of Italy
- In office 24 May 1924 – 22 December 1928

Personal details
- Born: 15 April 1873 Traetto, Kingdom of Italy
- Died: 9 January 1943 (aged 69) Rome, Kingdom of Italy
- Party: National Fascist Party
- Awards: Order of the Crown of Italy; Order of Saints Maurice and Lazarus; Order of Pope Pius IX

Pietro Fedele (15 April 1873 –9 January 1943) was an Italian historian and Fascist politician who served as Minister of Public Education of the Kingdom of Italy from 1925 to 1928.

== Biography ==
He was born in Traetto, present-day Minturno, on 15 April 1873, to Ferdinando Fedele, a factory worker, and Angela Conte, a farmer. His elder brother, Salvatore, was a clergyman and sent him to study at the seminary of Gaeta; Pietro, however, left it to finish his studies at the Pontifical University of the Holy Cross in Rome. In 1890, he moved to the University of Rome, where he attended courses in Christian archeology, Romance philology, paleography, diplomatics, ancient history and medieval history. He finally graduated in Literature in 1894. He began his career as a teacher in the middle schools of Rome, Arpino, Sezze and Velletri, and then moved on to the high schools of Potenza, Benevento and Naples.

In 1905, he obtained the chair of modern history at the Scientific-Literary Academy of Milan, and from 1910 was professor of modern history at the University of Turin, then at the University of Rome from 1914, and from 1933, professor of medieval history at the same university. An expert in the history of the Middle Ages, from 5 June 1933 to his death, he was president of the Italian Historical Institute for the Middle Ages, of which he proposed the change of headquarters to the Oratorio dei Filippini. He was also a member of the Accademia dei Lincei from 1926. In the 1930s he directed the editing of the Great UTET Encyclopedic Dictionary, one of the most important Italian encyclopedias.

He married Tecla De Fabritiis, from Itri, and had a daughter with her, Giovanna.

=== Political career ===
Too old to participate in World War I, he was an outspoken interventionist. In April 1924, he was elected to the Italian Chamber of Deputies, and in September of the same year, he joined the National Fascist Party, later becoming a member of the Grand Council of Fascism. On 5 January 1925, Alessandro Casati, Minister of Public Education, resigned in protest against the speech with which Benito Mussolini had taken moral responsibility for the murder of Giacomo Matteotti, and the Duce chose Fedele as his successor. The choice, opposed by Giovanni Gentile (who would have preferred Balbino Giuliano), was due to Fedele's excellent relationship with the Catholic Church and to his personal friendship with Pope Pius XI.

During his tenure as minister, he committed himself to the complete fascistization of schools, preventing the appointment of teachers not enrolled in the Fascist Party and starting the drafting of a single textbook for the entire nation. He also ordered the resumption of the archaeological excavations of Herculaneum and Pompeii, the recovery of the Nemi ships and the opening of the Directorate General for libraries. In 1926, he organized a meeting in Assisi with Cardinal Rafael Merry del Val aimed at improving relations between Italy and the Church in view of the future Lateran Pacts, the first official meeting between an Italian minister and a papal legate.

However, he was often widely criticized by party members for being "too soft"; among his main detractors were Augusto Turati, Ernesto Codignola, Vittorio Cian, Bernardo Barbiellini Amidei and, above all, Giovanni Gentile, who wrote about him in an article for Il Popolo d'Italia, which was never published, "It is clear that he is in the government and among the fascists with the spirit of Don Abbondio." Also, because of this criticism, on 9 July 1928, he left his post, being replaced by Giuseppe Belluzzo. On 22 December of the same year, Mussolini appointed him senator; the appointment was validated on 6 May and Fedele was sworn in on 15 May.

Starting from 1930, he held the office of commissioner of the king at the Heraldic Council, and was also president of the State Polygraphic Institute and vice-president of the High Council of Archives of the Kingdom. He died in Rome after a long illness on 9 January 1943.
