= Federico Amoroso =

- Born: 29 May 1891; Naples, Kingdom of Italy
- Died: 2 April 1968 (aged 76); Rome, Italy
- Military career
- Allegiance: Kingdom of Italy
- Branch: Royal Italian Army
- Rank: Major General
- Commands: M 19 (airship); 5th Engineer Regiment
- Conflicts: Italo-Turkish War; World War I; Second Italo-Ethiopian War; World War II; Greco-Italian War
- Awards: Silver Medal of Military Valor; War Cross for Military Valor; Military Order of Savoy; Order of Merit of the Italian Republic

Federico Amoroso (Naples, 29 May 1891 – Rome, 2 April 1968) was an Italian general during World War II. From 25 July 1943 to 11 February 1944 he served as Minister of Communications of the Badoglio I Cabinet, the first after the fall of the Fascist regime.

== Biography ==
He was born in Naples on 29 May 1891. After attending the Royal Military Academy of Artillery and Engineers in Turin, he graduated as second lieutenant of the engineers; after promotion to lieutenant he served in Libya during the Italo-Turkish War with the 3rd Engineer Regiment. After the Kingdom of Italy entered the First World War on 24 May 1915 he fought on the Italian Front, and in January 1917 he was transferred to the airship service at his request. In September of the same year he became deputy airship commander, taking part in bombing missions on the Piave front, and in 1918 he was promoted to major, assuming command of the airship M.19 (based in Ferrara) on 25 June. By the end of the war he had received a Silver Medal of Military Valor and a War Cross for Military Valor.

He was promoted to lieutenant colonel on 16 January 1927, after which he taught at the Radio Telegraph Institute until 16 March 1934, when he was assigned to the 8th Engineer Regiment. On 17 December 1934 he became commander of the 5th Engineer Regiment, and six days later he was promoted to colonel. He then took part in the Second Italo-Ethiopian War as commander of the engineers of the II Corps, remaining in Italian East Africa until 1 November 1936, when he was repatriated and assigned to the Ministry of War. On 30 June 1939 he was promoted to brigadier general and given command of the engineers of the Army Corps of Bolzano. After Italy entered the Second World War on 10 June 1940 he assumed command of the engineers of the XVIII Army Corps of Bolzano and of that of the territorial defense of the same city; during the Greco-Italian War he commanded the engineers of the Ninth Army and was then engineer-in-chief of the Armed Forces High Command of Albania.

From 10 September 1941 he command the engineers of the XII Army Corps, stationed in Palermo, and on 1 January 1942 he was promoted to major general. From 1 May 1942 he commanded the engineers of the Second Army in Fiume. After the fall of Fascism he was appointed Minister of Communications in the Badoglio I Cabinet from 27 July 1943 to 11 February 1944. In March 1945 he was appointed Inspector of Engineers of the Italian Co-Belligerent Army, a post he held until January 1946. After the war he was president of the National Association of Engineers and Transmitters of Italy from 1959 to 1966. He died in Rome on 2 April 1968.
