= Renato Acanfora =

Italian footballer

Personal information
- Date of birth: 23 July 1957 (age 69)
- Place of birth: Scafati, Italy
- Height: 1.85 m (6 ft 1 in)
- Position: Midfielder

Senior career*
Years	Team	Apps	(Gls)
1975–1978	Internazionale	3	(0)
1976–1977	→ Lecco (loan)	23	(6)
1977–1981	Monza	91	(8)
1981–1982	Prato	21	(2)
1982–1983	Taranto	29	(3)
1983	Prato	6	(0)
1983–1985	Rende	58	(1)
1985–1987	Pro Italia Galatina	60	(1)
1987–1988	Martina	26	(0)
1988–1991	Vastese	49	(0)
- * Club domestic league appearances and goals

Renato Acanfora (born 23 July 1957 in Scafati) is an Italian former football player.

Acanfora began playing club football with Inter Milan. After only making a few Serie A appearances, he moved to A.C. Monza where he would have several successful seasons in Serie B.

After he retired from playing football, Acanfora studied medicine and became a doctor. He was Scafati Basket's team doctor in 2020.
