= Vito Reale =

Italian politician

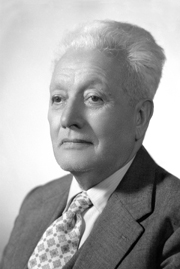

Minister of the Interior of the Kingdom of Italy
- In office 11 February 1944 – 22 April 1944
- Preceded by: Umberto Ricci
- Succeeded by: Salvatore Aldisio
- Member of the Chamber of Deputies of the Kingdom of Italy
- In office 1 December 1919 – 25 January 1924

Member of the Italian Constituent Assembly
- In office 25 June 1946 – 31 January 1948

Member of the Senate of the Italian Republic
- In office 18 April 1948 – 28 April 1953

Personal details
- Born: 22 December 1883 Viggiano, Kingdom of Italy
- Died: 28 April 1953 (aged 69) Rome, Italy
- Party: National Democratic Union

Vito Reale (Viggiano, 23 December 1883 – Rome, 28 April 1953) was an Italian politician, who served as third and last Minister of the Interior of the Badoglio I Cabinet. He was also a member of the Italian Chamber of Deputies in the early 1920s, of the Italian Constituent Assembly after World War II, and of the Italian Senate from 1948 until his death in 1953.

== Biography ==
He worked as a lawyer in the tribunal of Potenza, and was Mayor of Viggiano, his hometown, from 1910 to 1915, and well as member of the Regional Council of Basilicata from 1912. In 1919 he was elected to the Italian Chamber of Deputies and again in 1921, until 1924; during the latter he was secretary of the Permanent Parliamentary Commission of Internal Affairs. After the fall of the Fascist regime in 1943 he became State Undersecretary for the Interior and later (formally from February 1944, but de facto from November 1943, as the titular minister Umberto Ricci had remained in Rome) Minister of the Interior in the Badoglio I Cabinet of the "Kingdom of the South". After the end of the war, he was a member of the Italian Constituent Assembly from 1946 to 1948 and of the Italian Senate from 1948 until his death in 1953.
