= Giuseppe Belluzzo =

Italian politician (1876–1952)

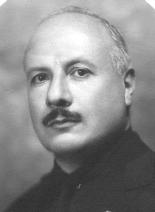

Minister of National Education
- In office 9 July 1928 – 12 September 1929
- Prime Minister: Benito Mussolini
- Preceded by: Pietro Fedele
- Succeeded by: Balbino Giuliano

Minister of National Economy
- In office 10 July 1925 – 9 July 1928
- Prime Minister: Benito Mussolini
- Preceded by: Cesare Nava
- Succeeded by: Alessandro Martelli

Personal details
- Born: 25 November 1876 Verona, Kingdom of Italy
- Died: 21 May 1952 (aged 75) Rome, Italy
- Children: 3
- Education: Polytechnic University of Milan
- Occupation: Mechanical engineer

Giuseppe Belluzzo (1876–1952) was an Italian mechanical engineer, scholar and politician. He was a member of the Italian Parliament and of the Italian Senate. He served as the minister of national economy and minister of public education in the cabinet of Benito Mussolini.

== Early life and education ==
Belluzzo was born in Verona on 25 November 1876 into a working-class family. At 16 he obtained a license from a technical institute. Then he graduated from the Polytechnic University of Milan receiving a degree in mechanical engineering.

== Career and activities ==
In 1899 Belluzzo won an award for his study on hydraulic turbines. In 1905 he established the first steam tribune of Italy. From 1914 to 1929 he was a full professor of construction of thermal and hydraulic engines at his alma mater, Polytechnic University of Milan. During World War I he joined the Italian army and was decorated with the war cross for his service. In the elections of 1924 and 1929 he won a seat at the Parliament, representing the Province of Verona. On 10 July 1925 Belluzzo was appointed minister of national economy to the cabinet led by Benito Mussolini. He replaced Cesare Nava in the post. In 1926 Belluzzo established the National Institute of Statistics.

Belluzzo's term as minister of national economy ended on 9 July 1928, and Alessandro Martelli replaced him in the post. On the same day he was named as the minister of public education in the same cabinet, replacing Pietro Fedele in the post. Belluzzo held the post until 12 September 1929 when Balbino Giuliano was appointed as minister of public education. In 1929 he began to work at the school of engineering in Rome as a professor of construction of thermal and hydraulic engines. He was also made the President of the Royal Lombard Institute of Sciences and Letters. In 1934 he became a senator and served at the Senate until 1939.

== Personal life and death ==
Belluzzo was married and had three children. He died in Rome on 21 May 1952.

=== Awards ===
Belluzzo was the recipient of the following:

- Knight of the Order of the Crown of Italy (28 April 1907)
- Officer of the Order of the Crown of Italy (20 December 1914)
- Commander of the Order of the Crown of Italy (24 May 1917)
- Grand Officer of the Order of the Crown of Italy (10 August 1923)
- Grand cordon of the Order of the Crown of Italy (15 November 1925)
- Knight of the Order of Saints Maurice and Lazarus (24 July 1919)
- Commander of the Order of Saints Maurice and Lazarus (9 June 1930)
- Grand cordon of the Order of Saints Maurice and Lazarus (28 January 1932)
- Knight Grand Cross of the Order of Orange-Nassau of the Netherlands (9 April 1926)

=== Legacy ===
Two streets are named after Giuseppe Belluzzo in Verona and Rome. In October 2016 a book, Giuseppe Belluzzo. Tecnico e politico nella storia d'Italia 1876–1952, was published by Michela Minesso. The book presents the details of his life.
