= Luigi Vannutelli Rey =

Italian diplomat and aristocrat (1880–1968)

Count Luigi Vannutelli Rey (19 August 1880 – 3 December 1968) was an Italian diplomat and aristocrat. He was Ambassador in Prague from 1928–1930, Ambassador in Warsaw from 1931–1932, and Ambassador in Brussels from 1932–1939.
