= Alessandro Martelli =

Italian academic and politician (1876–1934)

Alessandro Martelli OCI
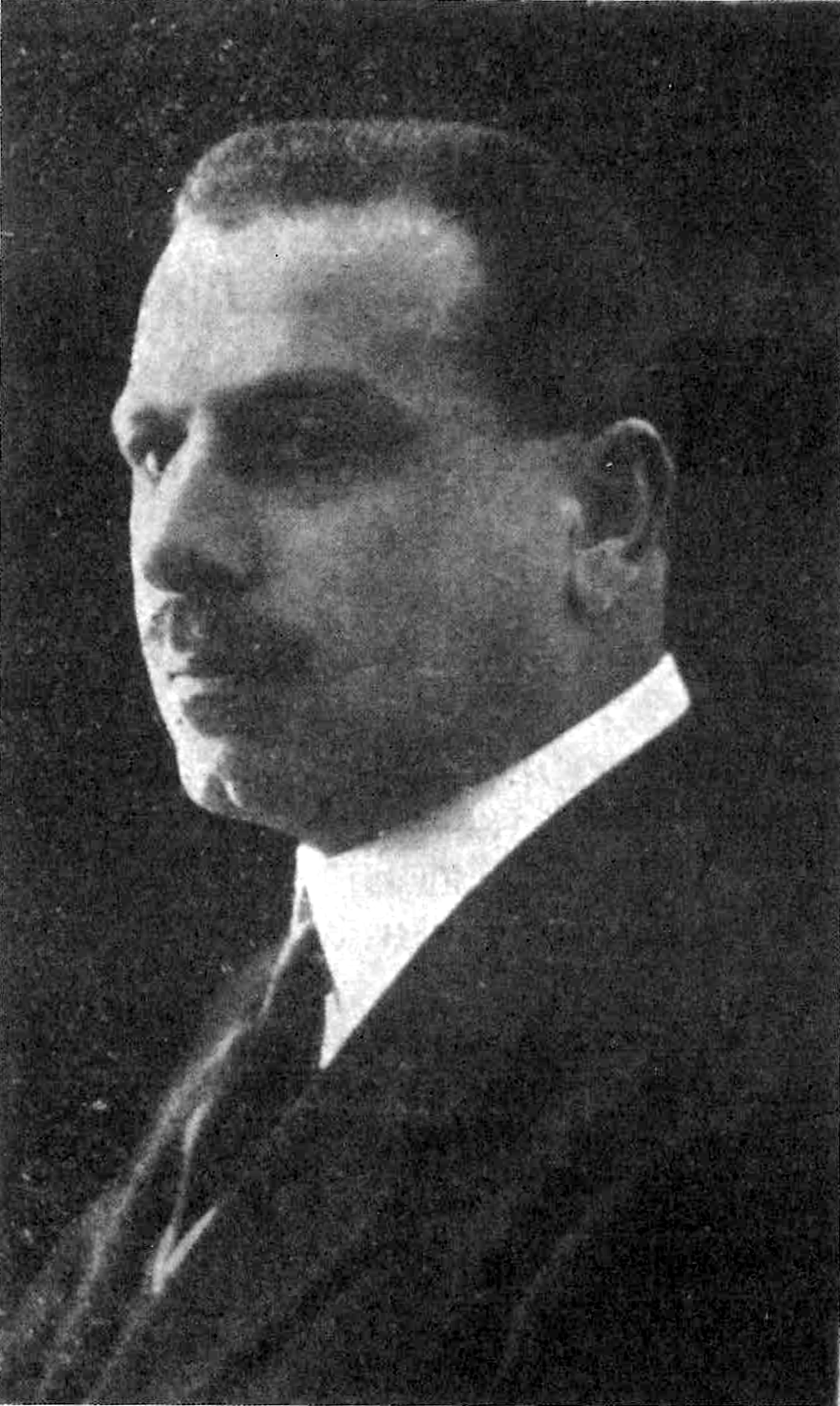

Minister of National Economy
- In office 9 July 1928 – 12 September 1929
- Prime Minister: Benito Mussolini
- Preceded by: Giuseppe Belluzzo
- Succeeded by: Giuseppe Bottai (Note: as Minister of Corporations)

Personal details
- Born: 25 November 1876 Caltanissetta, Kingdom of Italy
- Died: 5 October 1934 (aged 57) Florence, Kingdom of Italy
- Resting place: Vinci cemetery, Florence
- Party: National Fascist Party
- Spouse: Dolores Corsi
- Children: 2
- Education: University of Florence
- Occupation: Academic

Alessandro Martelli (1876–1934) was an Italian academic and politician. He served as the minister of national economy in the cabinet led by Benito Mussolini between 1928 and 1929.

== Early life and education ==
Martelli was born in Caltanissetta on 25 November 1876. He graduated from the Institute of Higher Studies in Florence in July 1900.

== Career and activities ==
Following his graduation, Martelli joined the academy and became professor of mineralogy and geology at the University of Florence between 1910 and 1927. He also served as a faculty member at the University of Rome in the field of geology in 1927.

Martelli participated in both Italo-Turkish War (1911–1912) and World War I. He took part in March on Rome in October 1922. He was elected to the Chamber of Deputies in 1924 for the National Fascist Party and served there for two terms. In 1926, he was made undersecretary of transportation. On 9 July 1928, he was appointed minister of national economy, replacing Giuseppe Belluzzo in the post. Martelli's term ended on 12 September 1929. Following this incident, the ministry was replaced by the Ministry of guilds.

Later, he served as the head of the Italian automotive gasoline company Agip. Martelli was named as a senator in March 1934.

== Personal life and death ==
In February 1904, Martelli married Dolores Corsi, with whom he had two sons. He died in Florence on 5 October 1934 and was buried there in the Vinci cemetery.

== Awards ==
Martelli was the recipient of the following:

- : Knight of the Order of the Crown of Italy (11 June 1916)
- : Officer of the Order of the Crown of Italy (8 January 1920)
- : Commander of the Order of the Crown of Italy (2 January 1921)
- : Grand officer of Order of the Crown of Italy (31 January 1926)
- Grand cordon of the Order of the Crown of Italy (25 October 1932)
- : Commander of the Order of Saints Maurice and Lazarus (9 June 1930)
