= Domenico Bartolini =

Italian politician (1880–1960)

Minister of Finance of the Kingdom of Italy
- In office 26 July 1943 – 11 February 1944
- Preceded by: Giacomo Acerbo
- Succeeded by: Guido Jung
- Senator of the Kingdom of Italy
- In office 14 November 1939 – 2 June 1946

Personal details
- Born: 26 August 1880 Rome, Kingdom of Italy
- Died: 5 April 1960 (aged 79) Rome, Italy
- Awards: Order of Saints Maurice and Lazarus; Order of the Crown of Italy; Colonial Order of the Star of Italy

Domenico Bartolini (Rome, 26 August 1880 – 5 April 1960) was an Italian politician and civil servant, who served as Minister of Finance of the Badoglio I Cabinet, the first after the fall of the Fascist regime.

== Biography ==
From 1908 to 1920 he was treasurer of the Italian Chamber of Deputies, and from 1920 to 1922 he served as general intendant of the Banco di Roma; on behalf of Minister Alberto de' Stefani, he prepared the decree for the establishment of the General Superintendency of the State, which he headed from 1923 to 1944. He was also director of the State Polygraphic Institute. From July 1933 to 1939 he took over the direction of the Institute of the Italian Encyclopedia, which he would later head once again from 1947 to 1960. In 1939 he was appointed Senator of the Kingdom by Victor Emmanuel III. After the fall of the Fascist regime, he was Minister of Finance of the Badoglio I Cabinet from 26 July 1943 to 11 February 1944, but he remained in Rome when the king and most of the government fled south after the armistice of Cassibile in September 1943, hiding from the authorities of the Italian Social Republic which had ordered his arrest, and was thus unable to carry out his duties. On 8 July 1948 he was judged by the High Court of Justice for the Sanctions against Fascism and deprived of his Senatorial seat as a "Senator held responsible for having maintained fascism and made the war possible both with votes and with individual actions, including propaganda exercised inside and outside the Senate". He died in 1960.
