= Giovanni Cuomo =

Italian politician, lawyer and teacher (1874–1948)

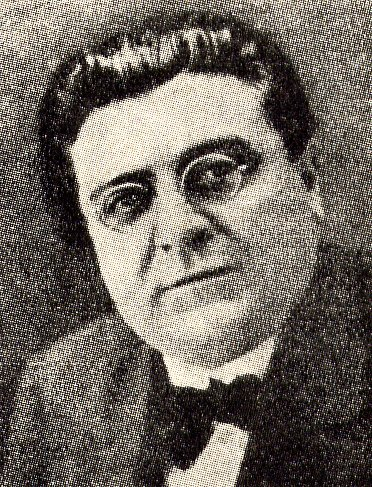

Minister of National Education
- In office 11 February 1944 – 22 April 1944
- President: Pietro Badoglio
- Preceded by: Leonardo Severi
- Succeeded by: Adolfo Omodeo

Personal details
- Born: 23 December 1874 Salerno, Kingdom of Italy
- Died: 24 March 1948 (aged 73) Salerno, Italy

Giovanni Cuomo (23 December 1874 – 24 March 1948) was an Italian politician, lawyer and teacher.

== Life ==
Born in Salerno in 1874, Cuomo since teenager followed ideals of liberalism and nationalism. He graduated as lawyer in 1905.

He was elected deputy for the first time 16 November 1919. in XXV Legislature of the Kingdom of Italy and was a member of the Standing Committee for Public Education. Re-elected in XXVI Legislature, he was faithful to the liberal line of Giovanni Amendola.

After the onset of Fascism, he decided to retire from active political life to dedicate himself to his lawyer career and to teaching. But, after the fall of Mussolini and the end of the regime, he was called in 1943 first as Secretary and then as Minister of National Education in the first Badoglio government, during the constitutional transition.

In 1944 obtained the creation of the Magistero faculty in Salerno, that was the first development of the University of Salerno (that was created after WW2): it is considered as the "continuation" of the historical Schola Medica Salernitana.

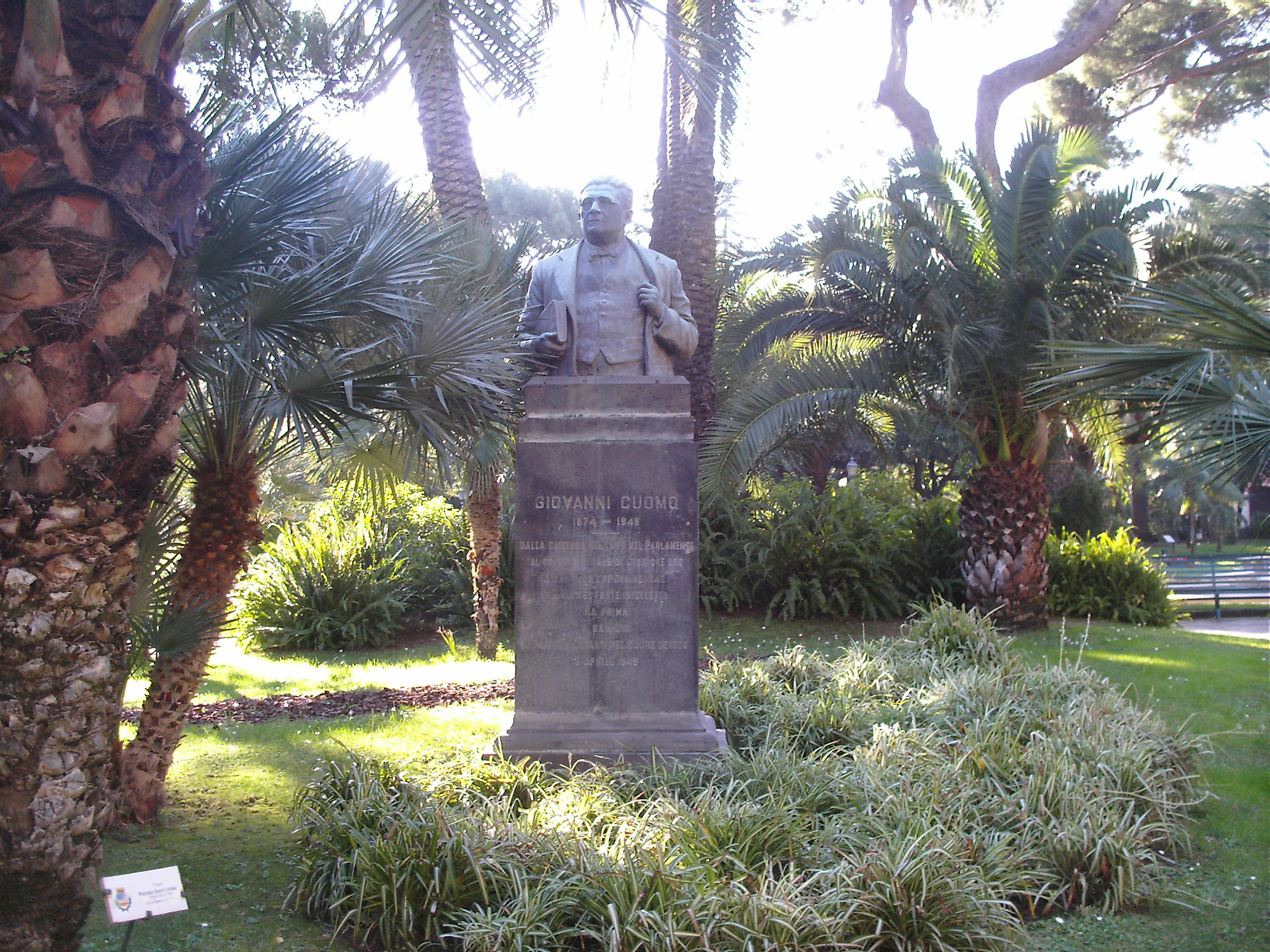
Monument to Giovanni Cuomo in Salerno

Giovanni Cuomo was elected "senator" in 1946 and died in his Salerno in 1948.

His personal library is preserved as a special collection in the University of Salerno Central Library E.R. Caianiello and consists of over 11000 volumes.

== Main works ==
Literary writings

- Dell'ingegno poetico di Cicerone. Salerno. 1899 – via Jovane.
- Noterelle critiche. Salerno. 1899 – via Jovane.
- Intime. Salerno. 1900 – via Fruscione.
- Il Torrismondo del Tasso e l'Edipo di Sofocle. Napoli. 1900 – via Emil Press.

Law & historical books

- Il delitto di mandato. Napoli. 1905.
- La mia incompatibilità forense. Salerno. 1906 – via Jovane.
- Il lavoro e l'evoluzione economica. Napoli. 1907.
- Gli studi professionali moderni specialmente in Italia. Napoli. 1907 – via Emil Press.
- Relazioni e proposte per l'ordinamento, i programmi, le funzioni e le finalità degli istituti e delle scuole commerciali. Salerno. 1908.
- Gli istituti di rappresentanza commerciale. Profilo e attribuzioni nella storia e nel diritto. Salerno. 1911.
- Discorsi parlamentari. Salerno. 1924 – via Spadafora.

== Bibliography ==
- Bonani, Vittoria. Giovanni Cuomo e il suo tempo: 1943-1948 Gaia Ed. Salerno, 2007 ISBN 978-88-89821-25-1
