= Guido Jung =

Italian entrepreneur and politician

Cavaliere Guido Jung
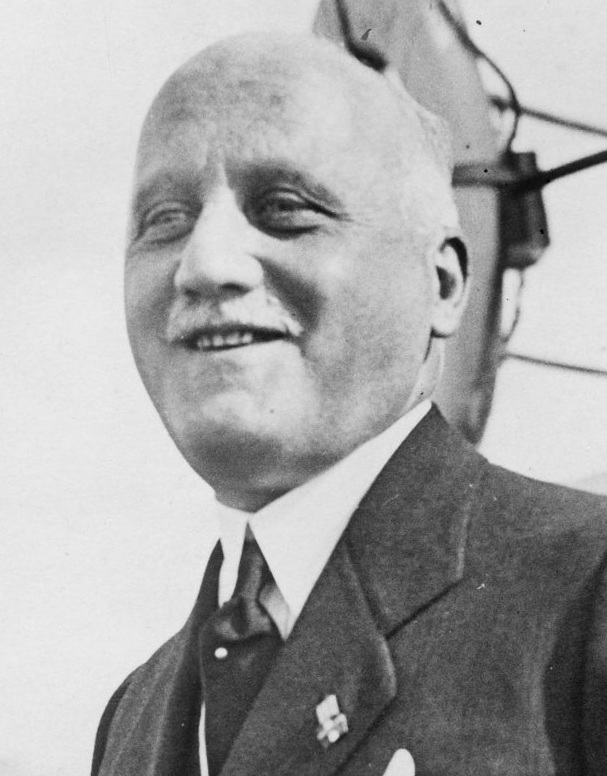

Consigliere of Fascism
- In office July 1932 – January 1935
- Duce of Fascism: Benito Mussolini

Italian Minister of Finance
- In office July 1932 – January 1935
- Monarch: Victor Emmanuel III
- Prime Minister: Benito Mussolini
- Preceded by: Antonio Mosconi
- Succeeded by: Paolo Ignazio Maria Thaon di Revel
- In office February 1944 – April 1944
- Monarch: Victor Emmanuel III
- Prime Minister: Pietro Badoglio
- Preceded by: Domenico Bartolini
- Succeeded by: Quinto Quintieri

Personal details
- Born: 2 February 1876 Palermo, Palermo, Sicily
- Died: 25 December 1949 (aged 73) Sicily
- Party: National Fascist Party
- Occupation: Merchant, politician
- Civilian awards: Cavaliere dell'Ordine della Corona d'Italia

Military service
- Allegiance: Italy
- Branch/service: Royal Italian Army
- Years of service: 1914–1917, 1935–1939, 1944–1945
- Rank: Lieutenant Colonel
- Military awards: Medaglia d'Argento al Valore Militare

Guido Jung (2 February 1876 – 25 December 1949) was a successful Jewish-born Italian banker and merchant from Sicily.

He was a member of the Grand Council of Fascism and served as Italian Minister of Finance from 1932-35 under Benito Mussolini. Jung was an important player in international finance during the interwar period, leading Italian negotiations with the United States over tariff questions, heading Italo-German economic talks with Hermann Göring, and representing Italy at the London Economic Conference during which he was heralded in press reports for his diplomatic tact.

As Italy's alliance with Germany grew stronger, Jung was ultimately sidelined by Mussolini due to his Jewish heritage, despite reports from the Organization for Vigilance and Repression of Anti-Fascism that described him as a disciplined and loyal fascist. After the surrender of Italy, Jung briefly served as finance minister a second time – in 1944 – under Pietro Badoglio but was dismissed after three months following allegations concerning the extent and depth of his roots in the National Fascist Party. Though a fanatical fascist, Jung drew a sharp distinction between fascism and Nazism, once comparing the Nazi Party to a baby and later reportedly calling Adolf Hitler a "blockhead".

An artillery officer in the Italian Army during both world wars, Jung commanded troops in both Europe and Africa. For various acts of bravery in combat, he was decorated with the Silver Medal of Military Valor on four occasions. He was created a knight of the Order of the Crown of Italy by Victor Emmanuel III.

== Early life ==
Jung was born in Sicily to a wealthy, Orthodox Jewish merchant family who had emigrated from Germany. The Palazzo Jung on via Lincoln in Palermo had belonged to the family. As a young man, he undertook a business apprenticeship in London.

== Career ==
=== Private sector and military service ===
Jung took over the family business of fruit importing and ran it to continued commercial success. He also served on the board of directors of the Bank of Palermo, in recognition of which he was, in 1906, invested into the Order of the Crown of Italy at the degree of Cavaliere.

During World War I, Jung served in the Royal Italian Army's 25th Artillery Regiment, rising to the rank of captain and being decorated with the Bronze Medal of Military Valor which was, on application of Jung's commander, subsequently converted to the Silver Medal of Military Valor.

=== Minister of Finance (1932 to 1935) ===
Jung, who in 1922 had served as financial attache at the Italian embassy in Washington, D.C., was elevated to the Grand Council of Fascism in the summer of 1932 by virtue of his appointment as Minister of Finance; the senior ministers of the government were also de facto members of the Grand Council.

Prime Minister Benito Mussolini reasoned at the time that "a Jew should be at the head of finance".

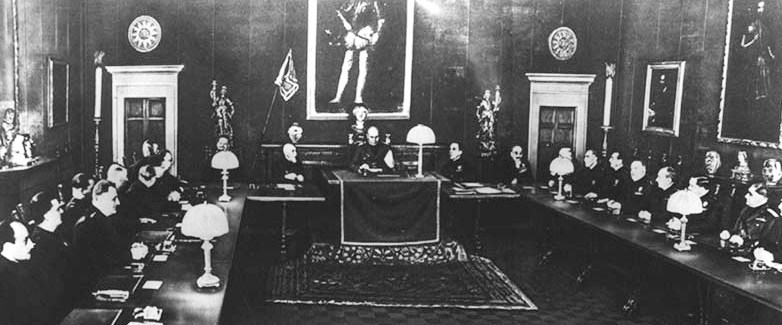
As a senior minister in the cabinet, Jung was also a member of the Grand Council of Fascism, pictured here in 1936.

During an official visit by Hermann Göring to Italy, Mussolini assigned Jung to meet with the German minister, prompting David Schwartz of the Wisconsin Jewish Chronicle to write that "it must have been a lesson in tolerance".

In May 1933, he represented Italy to the United States during tariff discussions and was feted with an official dinner at the White House by President of the United States Franklin Roosevelt.

In a subsequent meeting with Mussolini, U.S. ambassador John W. Garrett reported that "he [Mussolini] was very gratified at the cordiality of Jung’s reception in America".

As minister, Jung helped establish the Istituto per la Ricostruzione Industriale. He was also the Italian delegate to the London Economic Conference and was credited in news reports with "keeping the conflicting elements of the parley from completely disrupting the conference". During the same Conference, he signed an agreement, sponsored by Galeazzo Ciano and at the time kept secret to the world, with the minister of China, T.V. Soong, that concluded the long-lasting negotiations for the settlement of the Boxer Indemnity and the outstanding amount of the Skoda loan with Italy.

==== Political views ====
In a 1933 interview with the Jewish Telegraphic Agency, Jung compared Nazism to Fascism by equating it to the difference between "an infant to a ten-year-old boy". The following year he is on record as referring to Adolf Hitler as a "blockhead" and a "blatherer".

While he declared there was no antisemitism in Italy, Jung also dismissed the very existence of antisemitism, explaining to Emil Ludwig his belief that it was a "doctrine upheld by those sub-Alpine peoples who could not write at the time Rome saw Caesar, Vergil, and August".

=== Later years ===
After being released from the cabinet, Jung, then aged 59, volunteered for military service in Ethiopia ultimately commanding 6,000 men. By this point, Jung had stopped adhering to Judaism. In 1935, he was received into the Roman Catholic faith.

Nonetheless, in 1939, with the enactment of the Italian Racial Laws, he was dismissed from military service. His personal appeals to Mussolini to grant him an exception went unheeded, despite supporting reports from the OVRA that described him as a disciplined and loyal Fascist.

In February 1944, following the Armistice of Cassibile, Jung was again given charge of the finance ministry.

The appointment of Jung met with concern from the United States, with the U.S. Army's Psychological Warfare Branch charging that Jung had deep Fascist roots that significantly predated his earlier service as finance minister, possibly extending to the March on Rome.

Jung's second stint as minister was short-lived and he was dismissed after just three months. At his request, he was restored to his military rank and assigned, first, to the 184th Paratroopers Artillery Regiment "Nembo" of the 184th Infantry Division "Nembo" in the Italian Co-belligerent Army, and then to the Combat Group "Folgore". During his service in Africa, and his later service in Europe, he would receive a total of three additional Silver Military Medals of Valor.

== Personal life ==
At least two of Jung's brothers also served in the Royal Italian Army during World War I. Guido Jung died in Sicily.

Political offices
| Preceded by Antonio Mosconi | Minister of Finance; 1932–1935 | Succeeded by Paolo Ignazio Maria Thaon di Revel |
| Preceded by Domenico Bartolini | Minister of Finance; 1944 | Succeeded by Quinto Quintieri |
