= 1925 in aviation =

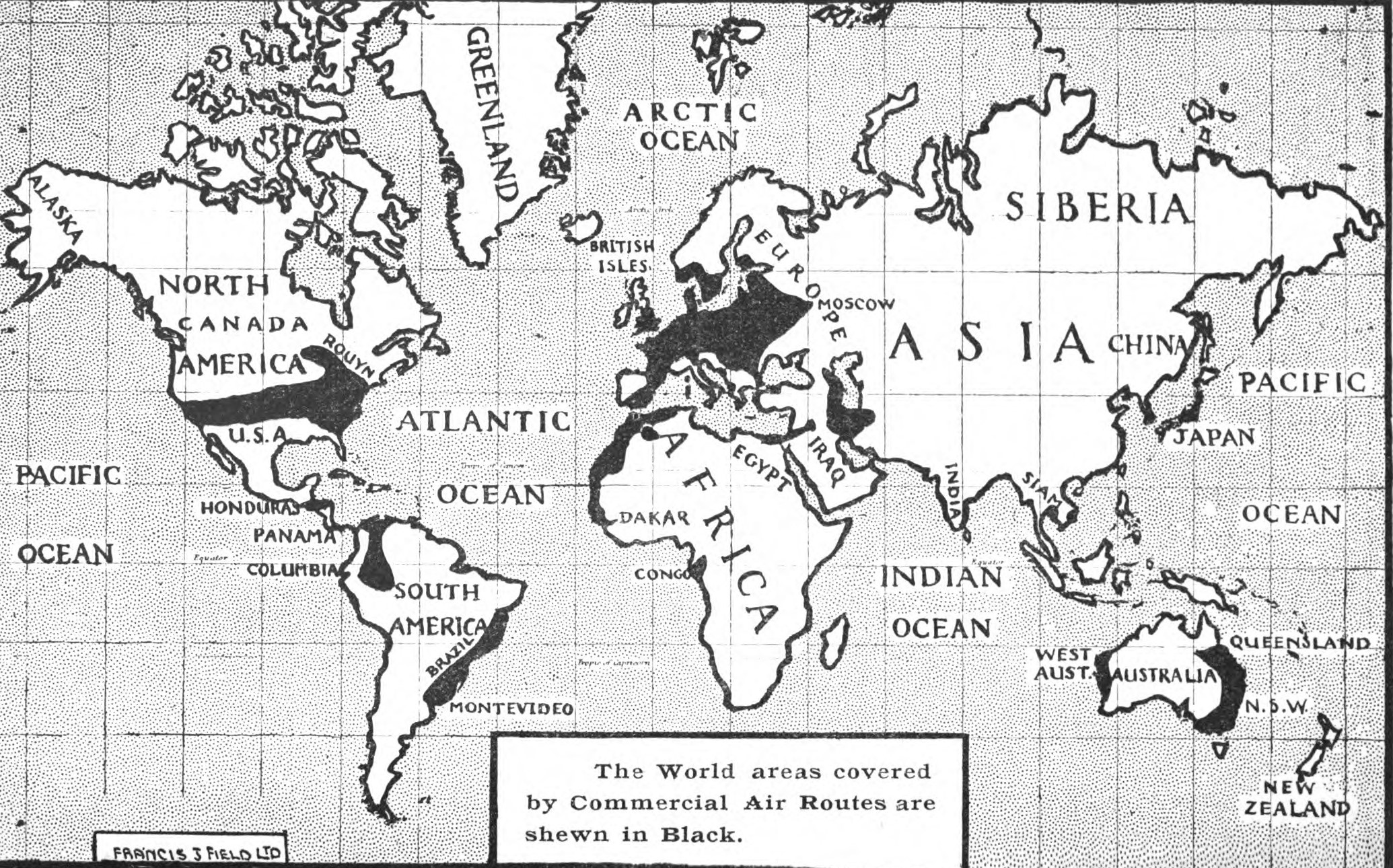
The areas of the world covered by commercial aviation in 1925

This is a list of aviation-related events from 1925.

== Events ==
- In the United Kingdom, the first Royal Auxiliary Air Force squadrons are formed.
- The Eberhart Steel Products Company of Buffalo, New York, forms an aircraft design and manufacturing subsidiary, the Eberhart Aeroplane and Motor Company.
- Summer 1925 – Two Breguet 19 G.R. aircraft owned by the Japanese Asahi Shimbun newspaper group fly from Tokyo, Japan, to Paris, France.

=== January ===
- January 1 – The French airline CIDNA is formed.

=== February ===
- February 3–4 – In a Breguet 19 G.R., the French aviators Henri Lemaître and Ludovic Arrachart set a world distance record, flying 3,166 km (1,967 mi) from Étampes, Paris, France, to Villa Cisneros, Spanish Sahara.
- February 12 – Sabena establishes the first airline connection between Belgium and the Belgian Congo, pioneering a long-haul route to Léopoldville.
- February 24 – Joseph Leonard Maries White, a Canadian World War I flying ace credited with 22 victories, dies in a crash following a mid-air collision with another aircraft at Camp Borden, Ontario, Canada.

=== March ===
- March 1 – T. Claude Ryan and Benjamin Franklin "Frank" Mahoney establish a scheduled air service — Los Angeles-San Diego Air Line — between San Diego and Los Angeles, California. It is the first scheduled passenger air service operated wholly over the contiguous United States and throughout the year.
- March 2 – Huff Daland Dusters is established in Macon, Georgia, in the United States as the world's first aerial crop dusting company. It will become Delta Air Service in 1928, then Delta Air Corporation in 1930, and then Delta Air Lines in 1945.
- March 22 – A Junkers F 13 flying in the Soviet Union from Tiflis to Sukhumi catches fire in mid-air and crashes, killing all five people aboard. The dead include the high-ranking Soviet security officials Georgi Atarbekov, Alexander Miasnikian, and Solomon Mogilevsky. Eyewitnesses report seeing people jump to their deaths to escape the burning plane.

=== April ===
- April
  - The first in-flight movie is shown on a scheduled flight: First National's The Lost World on Imperial Airways service from London to the Continent.
  - The Prix Solex, a competition in France offering a prize of 55,000 FF requiring a flight of about 120 kilometers (75 miles) from Paris to Rouen using less than 3 kilograms (6.6 pounds) of gasoline and oil, takes place. Maurice Drouhin wins in a Salmson 3 Ad-powered Farman Aviette.
- April 13 - The first scheduled air freight service begins in the United States.
- April 15 - Ukvozdukhput/Ukrainian Airways begins services in Ukraine.
- April 19 – T. Claude Ryan and Benjamin Franklin "Frank" Mahoney found Ryan Airline Company at Dutch Flats Airport in San Diego, California.
- April 21 – Italian aviator Francesco de Pinedo and his mechanic Ernesto Campanelli depart Rome on a 201-day flight in the SIAI S.16ter flying boat Gennariello that will take them to Australia and Japan before they return to Rome in November.

=== May ===
- May 1 - The Imperial Japanese Army Air Corps is established under the command of Lieutenant General Kinichi Yasumitsu. It has 3,700 personnel and about 500 aircraft.
- May 4 – Italian legislation sets the peacetime strength of the Regia Aeronautica (Italian Royal Air Force) at 182 squadrons, with 78 of them assigned directly to the air force, 69 to the Italian Royal Army, and 35 to the Regia Marina (Italian Royal Navy). The army and navy are given temporary command of the squadrons assigned to them for the length of time it takes to train them for wartime operations.
- May 12 – Hans-Georg von der Marwitz, a German World War I flying ace credited with 15 aerial victories, dies in a plane crash.
- May 23 – Rudolf Rienau, a German World War I flying ace credited with six aerial victories, dies in a flying accident at Staaken, Germany.

=== June ===
- June 10 – Italian aviator Francesco de Pinedo and his mechanic, Ernesto Campanelli, arrive at Melbourne, Australia, after a 50-day flight from Rome in the SIAI S.16ter flying boat Gennariello during which they have made 27 intermediate stops without serious mishaps. They will remain in Melbourne for 36 days before continuing their journey through Australia and to Japan.
- June 13 – French Navy aviation pioneer Capitaine de frégate (Frigate Captain) Paul Teste and Lieutenant de vaisseau (Ship-of-the-Line Lieutenant) Amanrich attempt a familiarization flight in the Amiot 120 prototype bomber they plan to use in a future Paris-to-Karachi flight, taking off from Villacoublay airfield at Villacoublay, France. Their plane strikes a tree just after takeoff, crashes, and bursts into flames. Amanrich is unharmed, but Teste suffers horrible burns and dies in agony at a hospital in Versailles a few hours later.
- June 20 – Off New England, a United States Coast Guard Vought UO-1 becomes the first aircraft to pursue a rum-runner.
- June 24 – Off New England, a U.S. Coast Guard Vought UO-1 becomes the first aircraft to assist in the capture of a rum-runner.

=== July ===
- July 1 – The United States Post Office Department inaugurates 24-hour transcontinental air mail service. Previously, mailplanes had not flown at night and trains had carried the mail during the hours of darkness, but the completion of a coast-to-coast system of lighted beacons has allowed night flying to become practical along the entire route. The day-and-night flying allows the transcontinental air mail service to deliver mail notably faster than train-only service for the first time.
- July 13 - Western Air Express, the future Western Airlines, is founded. It will begin flight operations in April 1926.
- July 16 – Italian aviator Francesco de Pinedo and his mechanic Ernesto Campanelli resume their flight from Italy to East Asia and the Western Pacific, flying from Melbourne to Sydney, Australia, in the SIAI S.16ter flying boat Gennariello after a 36-day stay in Melbourne. They had left Rome 86 days earlier and made 28 intermediate stops before arriving in Sydney. They will remain in Sydney for 21 days before continuing their journey through Australia and to Japan.

=== August ===
- The Italian government's Commission for Aeronautics is replaced by a new Ministry of Aeronautics. The Regia Aeronautica (Royal Air Force), formerly subordinate to the commission, is subordinated to the new ministry.
- August 6 – Italian aviator Francesco de Pinedo and his mechanic Ernesto Campanelli resume their flight from Italy to East Asia and the Western Pacific, departing Sydney, Australia, in the SIAI S.16ter flying boat Gennariello on their way to Tokyo.
- August 7–9 – Flying in France on the route Chartres–Étampes–Toussus-le-Noble–Chartres, the French aviators Jules Landry and Maurice Drouhin set a closed-circuit distance record of 4,400 kilometers (2,700 miles) in 45 hours 11 minutes 59 seconds in a Farman F.62.
- August 31 – Two United States Navy Naval Aircraft Factory PN-9 flying boats take off from San Francisco, California, in an attempt to make the first transpacific flight from North America to the Hawaiian Islands, planning to arrive on September 1 after an overnight flight expected to last about 26 hours. The first PN-9 to depart loses oil pressure and is forced down 300 miles (260 nmi; 480 km) from San Francisco; the destroyer USS William Jones (DD-308) rescues its crew and tows it back to port. The second plane to depart, piloted by Commander John Rodgers, is forced down in the Pacific Ocean on September 1 after flying 1,841.12 miles (1,599.89 nmi; 2,963.00 km) nonstop. Rodgers and his three crewmen then sail the aircraft as a boat 450 nautical miles (833 kilometres; 518 miles) farther toward Hawaii before the U.S. Navy submarine USS R-4 (SS-81) picks them up 10 nautical miles (19 kilometres; 12 miles) north of Kauai on September 10. Although unsuccessful, their flight sets a world nonstop distance record for Class C seaplanes which will stand until 1930.

=== September ===
- The Czechoslovak Avia BH-21R racer wins the Czechoslovak national air races, covering the 200 km (120 mi) course at an average speed of 300.59 km/h (186.78 mph).
- September 1 – After modifications, the aircraft carrier HMS Furious returns to service with the Royal Navy as the first ship ever to be equipped with a round-down Located at the after end of her flight deck, the round-down, which improves air flow and gives pilots landing aboard Furious greater confidence, will become standard on aircraft carriers.
- September 2 – The U.S. Navy dirigible USS Shenandoah (ZR-1) breaks up in a storm and crashes near Caldwell, Ohio, killing 14 of her crew. Twenty-nine crew members survive.
- September 3 – The Spanish Navy aviation ship Dédalo, the only ship ever built capable of operating airships, balloons, and seaplanes, accompanies a Spanish fleet to Morocco to participate in the Rif War. Her aircraft and one of the airships she operates support the Spanish campaign to capture Ajir, which falls on October 2. She is the only European aviation ship to see combat between the end of the Russian Civil War and the beginning of World War II.
- September 15 – The Bolivian airline Lloyd Aéreo Boliviano is founded.
- September 23 – The Bolivian airline Lloyd Aéreo Boliviano begins flight operations, flying a Junkers F.13 which takes off from Cochabamba, Bolivia.
- September 26 – Italian aviator Francesco de Pinedo and his mechanic Ernesto Campanelli arrive in Tokyo in the SIAI S.16ter flying boat Gennariello after a 58-day flight from Sydney, Australia, during which they have made 19 intermediate stops. They had departed Rome 158 days earlier and made 48 intermediate stops, including lengthy stays in Melbourne and Sydney, Australia, on their way to Tokyo, all without an engine change or any serious mishaps.
- September 28 – The first Ford National Reliability Air Tour begins. Of the 20 entrants, 17 start, taking off from Ford Airport in Dearborn, Michigan, to fly a 1,900-mile (1,700 nmi; 3,100 km) course with stops in 10 cities. The participants include Walter Beech and Earl Rowland. The tour cross-markets Ford Motor Company and its Stout Metal Airplane Division and showcases Henry Ford's new interest in aviation. On September 27, The New York Times had reported, "The object of the tour is to 'sell' aviation by proving that airplanes can carry freight and passengers long distances safely and quickly."

=== October ===
- October 3 or 30 – The Royal Navy cruiser Vindictive launches a Fairey IIID floatplane by catapult. It is the first catapult launch of a standard British naval aircraft from a ship at sea.
- October 4 – The first Ford National Reliability Air Tour concludes with its return to Ford Airport in Dearborn, Michigan. Entrants have flown a 1,775-mile (1,542 nmi; 2,857 km) in ten legs, with stops in Chicago and Moline, Illinois; Des Moines, Iowa; Omaha, Nebraska; St. Joseph, Kansas City, and St. Louis, Missouri; Indianapolis, Indiana; and Columbus and Cleveland, Ohio. Eleven entrants — including Walter Beech and Earl Rowland — receive perfect scores. The tour cross-markets Ford Motor Company and its Stout Metal Airplane Division, showcases Henry Ford's new interest in aviation, and demonstrates that airplanes can carry cargo and passengers safely and quickly over long distances.
- October 15 – The British airship R.33 successfully launches a de Havilland DH.53 Humming Bird piloted by Flying Officer Campbell MacKenzie-Richards and Flying Officer Riggs in flight.
- October 16 – The Air Union Farman F.60 Goliath F-HMFU Île de France crashes at Wadhurst, East Sussex, England, during a scheduled passenger flight from England to Paris, France. Three of the six people aboard die and two suffer injuries.
- October 17 – Italian aviator Francesco de Pinedo and his mechanic Ernesto Campanelli depart Tokyo in the SIAI S.16ter flying boat Gennariello after a 21-day stay to begin the homeward leg of their flight from Rome to Australia and Tokyo and back again. The only engine change of what has so far been a 187-day, 49-stop flight has been made in Tokyo.
- October 18
  - Joseph Sadi-Lecointe wins the Beumont Cup, with a speed of 194 mph (312 km/h).
  - American professional baseball player Marv Goodwin of the Cincinnati Reds is seriously injured during reserve duty with the United States Army Air Service when the plane he is piloting during a training exercise goes into a tailspin at an altitude of 200 feet (61 meters) and crash-lands at Ellington Field in Houston, Texas. He will die of his injuries on October 21, the first professional athlete killed as the result of a plane crash.
- October 19 – Frank T. Courtney makes the first flight in the United Kingdom by a rotary-wing aircraft, demonstrating the Cierva C.4 autogiro for the Royal Aircraft Establishment near Farnborough Airfield.
- October 25 – A storm with 80-mile-per-hour (129 km/h) winds strikes Bay Shore Park in Maryland on the Chesapeake Bay, where the United States Navy has moored 23 Curtiss SC-1 biplane floatplanes, planning to fly them in an air show demonstration during the next day's Schneider Trophy race. The gale breaks the 3-inch (76 mm) mooring lines of 17 of the floatplanes, which then are dashed against seawalls or the shore. Seven of the planes are destroyed and 10 damaged. The 26 October afternoon edition of the Baltimore Evening Sun has the headline "Plane Disaster in Harbor Called Hard Blow to Navy" and quotes United States Army Air Service Brigadier General William "Billy" Mitchell, who calls the loss of the CS-1s "staggering" and blames it on U.S. Navy mismanagement of its aviation program.
- October 26 – The 1925 Schneider Trophy race is flown at Baltimore, Maryland, in the United States. Jimmy Doolittle of the United States Army Air Service wins in a Curtiss R3C-2 at an average speed of 374.2 km/h (232.5 mph).

=== November ===
- In mid-month, Farman Aviation Works test pilot Louis Bossoutrot sets several load-related world aviation records in the prototype of the Farman F.140 Super Goliath, reaching an altitude of 4,990 meters (16,371 feet) with a useful load of 2,000 kilograms (4,409 pounds), an altitude of 3,586 meters (11,765 feet) with a useful load of 5,000 kilograms (11,023 pounds) and a flight duration of 1 hour 12 minutes 21 seconds, and an altitude of 2,000 meters (6,562 feet) with a greatest useful load of 6,000 kilograms (13,228 pounds).
- November 7 – Italian aviator Francesco de Pinedo and his mechanic Ernesto Campanelli return to Rome, completing a 201-day flight covering around 35,000 miles (56,000 kilometers) in the SIAI S.16ter flying boat Gennariello. Departing Rome on April 21, their outbound route had taken to them to Brindisi in Italy; Leros in Greece; Baghdad in Iraq; Bushehr and Chabar in Persia; Karachi, Bombay, Cocanada, and Calcutta in British India; Akyab, Rangoon, Tavoy, and Mergui in Burma; Phuket in Siam; Penang in British Malaya; Singapore; Batavia, Surabaya, Sumbawa, and Kupang in the Netherlands East Indies, and Broome, Carnarvon, Perth, Bunbury, Albany, Israelite Bay, Adelaide, and Melbourne, Australia, where they had arrived on June 10 and spent just over five weeks before proceeding to Sydney, where they had arrived on July 16 and spent another three weeks. Resuming their flight on August 6, they had visited Brisbane, Rockhampton, Townsville, Innisfail, and Cooktown, and Thursday Island, Australia; Merauke, Dobo, Amboina, and Menado in the Netherlands East Indies; Cebu, Atimonan, Manila, and Aparri in the Philippines; Tamsui on Formosa; Shanghai in China; Mokpo in Korea; and Yamakawa and Kagoshima, Japan, before arriving in Tokyo on September 26. After a three-week stay there, they had begun their return journey on October 17, a 15,000-mile (24,155-kilometer) trip that they make in only 22 days, with stops at Kagoshima; Shanghai; Hong Kong; Haiphong and Saigon in French Indochina; Bangkok in Siam; Rangoon; Calcutta, Benares, Delhi, and Karachi in British India; Bandar Abbas in Persia; Baghdad; Alexandretta in Turkey; and Taranto in Italy before arriving in Rome. The entire journey, made without special preparations for support at any of the stops and involving two long flights – of 600 and 1,200 miles (970 and 1,930 km) – across the dry land of the Indian subcontinent in a non-amphibious flying boat, proceeds without major incident and requires only one engine change, carried out at Tokyo. Flight describes the journey as "the most extensive aerial tour on record."
- November 20 – Germany holds a state funeral in Berlin for fighter pilot Manfred von Richthofen, the top-scoring ace of World War I with 80 aerial victories. He had been shot down and killed on 21 April 1918.
- November 26 – James Anderson Slater, a British World War I flying ace credited with 24 aerial victories, is one of two men killed in the crash of a Sopwith Snipe trainer at Pewsey, Wiltshire, England.

=== December ===
- December 4 – Georg Strasser, a German World War I flying ace credited with seven aerial victories, dies in a flying accident while working as a test pilot for Junkers.

== First flights ==
- Abrial A-2 Vautour
- Aero A.11
- Amiot 120
- Bernard SIMB AB 14
- Curtiss Carrier Pigeon
- Curtiss Lark
- Detroit G1 Gull
- Dewoitine D.14 (between 20 January and 4 February)
- Dewoitine D.19
- Dewoitine D.21
- Farman F.130
- Farman F.170 Jabiru
- Grigorovich SUVP
- Pitcairn PA-1 Fleetwing
- Westland Yeovil

=== January ===
- Avia BH-21
- January 3 - Fairey Fox
- January 5 - Short Singapore

=== February ===
- Gloster Gamecock
- Latécoère 15
- Thomas-Morse TM-24
- February 22 – de Havilland Moth

=== March ===
- Avro 563 Andover
- March 10 – Supermarine Southampton

=== April ===
- April 22 – Junkers J 29

=== May ===
- May 2 - Douglas C-1
- May 10 - Armstrong Whitworth Atlas
- May 26 - Bäumer B II Sausewind

=== June ===
- June 4 — Marinens Flyvebaatfabrikk M.F.9

=== July ===
- July 6 - Douglas DAM
- July 7 - Boeing 40
- July 29 - Blériot 155

=== August ===
- FBA 21
- August 24 – Supermarine S.4
- August 29 – Gloster III

=== September ===
- September 11 – Curtiss R3C-1

=== November ===
- Consolidated NY-1
- November 9 - Fairey Firefly (biplane)
- November 26 - Tupolev TB-1

=== December ===
- Curtiss P-2 Hawk
- Curtiss XP-2, a modified Curtiss P-2 Hawk

== Entered service ==
=== January ===
- Kawanishi K-7 Transport Seaplane with Japan Aviation Company Ltd

=== May ===
- May 15 – Junkers G.23 with Swedish Air Lines

=== August ===
- Curtiss F6C with the United States Navy
- August 17 – Curtiss P-1 Hawk with 1st Pursuit Group, United States Army Air Service

=== December ===
- Handley Page Hyderabad with the Royal Air Force's No. 9 (Bomber) Squadron, last RAF heavy bomber of wooden construction to enter squadron service

== Retirements ==
- May – Westland Weasel by the Royal Air Force
- Late 1925 – Westland Walrus by the Royal Air Force

== Births ==
- March 20 – David Warren, Australian aviation scientist, inventor of the cockpit voice recorder (d. 2010)
