= Chah Bahar, Markazi =

Chah Bahar (Persian: چابهار), in Markazi Province, may refer to:

- Chah Bahar, Komijan
- Chah Bahar, Saveh
