= Chah Bahar (disambiguation) =

Chah Bahar is a city in Sistan and Baluchestan Province, Iran

Chah Bahar (Persian: چابهار or چاه بهار) may also refer to:

- Chah Bahar County, in Sistan and Baluchestan Province
- Chah Bahar, Komijan, Markazi, Iran
- Chah Bahar, Saveh, Markazi, Iran
