= Francesco de Pinedo =

Italian aviator (1890–1933)

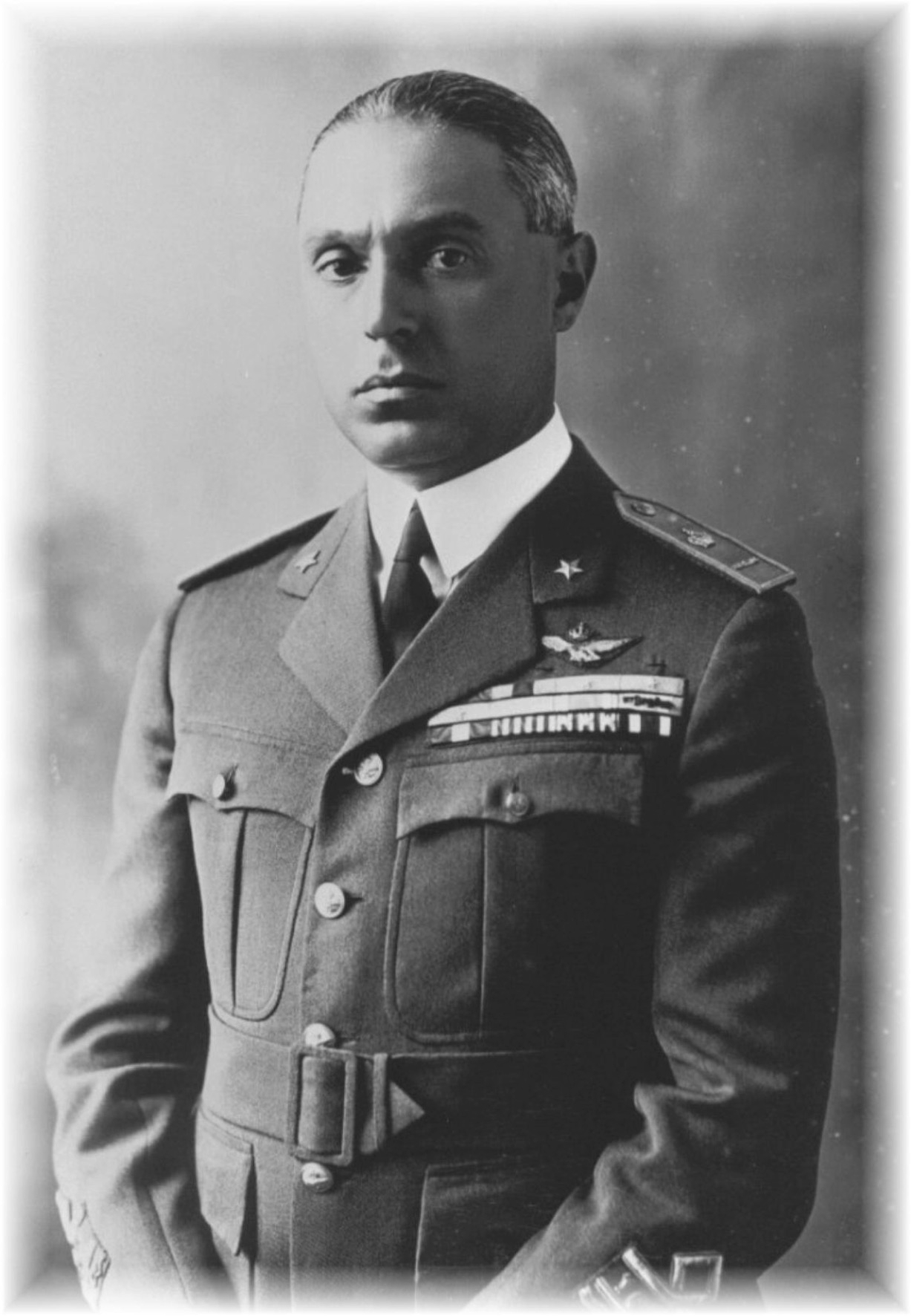
- Born: 16 February 1890; Naples, Italy
- Died: 2 September 1933 (aged 43); Brooklyn, New York, U.S.
- Burial place: Italy
- Military career
- Allegiance: Kingdom of Italy
- Branch: Regia Marina (1911–1923); Regia Aeronautica (1923–1933)
- Service years: 1911–1933
- Rank: Generale di divisione aerea (Air divisional general)
- Conflicts: Italo-Turkish War; World War I
- Awards: FAI Gold Air Medal; Air Force Cross (United Kingdom)

Francesco de Pinedo (February 16, 1890 – September 2, 1933) was an Italian aviator. A Regia Marina (Italy's Royal Navy) officer who transferred to the Regia Aeronautica (Italy's Royal Air Force), he was an advocate of the seaplane and is best known for his long-range flying boat flights in the 1920s that demonstrated the feasibility of global air travel.

== Early life ==
Pinedo was born on 16 February 1890 in Naples, Italy, into a patrician family, the son of a lawyer. As a teenager he studied literature and the arts and developed a lifelong passion for music.

== Career ==
=== Early career ===
Pinedo entered the Italian Naval Academy at Leghorn (Livorno) in 1908 at the age of 18. He graduated in 1911 and was commissioned as an officer in the Regia Marina (Italy's Royal Navy). He served aboard destroyers during the Italo-Turkish War of 1911–1912, witnessing Italy's air operations against the Ottoman Empire, the first time that any country had used aircraft in combat. The experience sparked his interest in aviation.

After Italy entered World War I on the side of the Allies in May 1915, de Pinedo again saw action at sea. In 1917, he volunteered for duty in the Regia Marina's air service. Entering flight school at Taranto in July 1917, he completed aviation training in only 45 days, and qualified as a pilot in two months. He spent most of the rest of the war flying reconnaissance missions for the Regia Marina.

After the war ended in November 1918, Pinedo returned briefly to sea duty, but soon resumed aviation duties. In the immediate postwar years he made milestone flights from Italy to the Netherlands and in 1921 from Brindisi to Constantinople in the Ottoman Empire. On 16 October 1923 he transferred from the Regia Marina to the Regia Aeronautica (Italy's Royal Air Force) which had been founded that year as an independent service. He entered the new service with a rank of tenente colonnello (lieutenant colonel) and because of his technical and organizational skills was given senior positions as its chief staff officer and the vice commandant of one of its air squadrons despite being only in his early 30s.

Pinedo's cultured background and naturally reserved nature, as well as the orderliness and neatness instilled in him by his naval training, made him atypical of the aviators of his day, who tended to be mavericks and daredevils. He preferred to avoid publicity. Adventurous without being reckless, he became an influential advocate of the seaplane, sharing a belief with many other aviators of his time that flying boats were the key to aviation's future because of their ability to land safely on the sea in the case of emergencies during long flights over water. He also believed that seaplanes were more practical than landplanes because of the proximity to water of most cities and towns. With airports not yet common, Pinedo observed, "Civilization is built on water. The world's principal cities are mirrored by seas, rivers, or lakes. Why not utilize these immense, ready-to-use, natural air strips in place of costly airports?" Pinedo even envisioned a day when people would commute to work each day by piloting their own seaplanes from ponds near their homes to municipal docks in city marinas, where they would moor their planes near their places of employment, then return to them to fly home for the evening.

By 1925, Pinedo's advocacy of the seaplane and its capability to make global air travel feasible led to him being regarded as Italy's leading expert on aviation matters, especially after he presented a paper to the Royal Aeronautical Society in London and published an article in National Geographic magazine.

A promising Regia Aeronautica career as a high-ranking staff officer beckoned to Pinedo, but this did not appeal to him. After only a year working at a desk he requested a leave of absence in late 1924 in order to return to the cockpit to make long-distance flights that would demonstrate the feasibility of long-distance air travel, highlight the superiority of the seaplane in such travel, and show the world that Italy led the way in the pioneering of long-distance aviation. The Fascist leader of Italy, Benito Mussolini, approved of the idea, allowing Pinedo to make the flights that brought him his greatest fame.

=== 1925 Rome-Australia-Tokyo-Rome flight ===
In 1920, the Italian aviators Arturo Ferrarin and Guido Masiero had made a multi-stop, 11,000-mile (18,000-km) flight from Rome to Tokyo in a pair of Ansaldo SVA-9 trainers. They had overcome various difficulties, including crashes that damaged or wrecked their aircraft, and they had been the only two out of 11 pilots that had begun the journey to complete it. They had left their planes behind in Japan and returned to Italy by ship. Pinedo proposed to explore the idea that a seaplane would have been a better choice for the trip by making a flight from Rome to Australia and Tokyo and then back to Rome again, a journey over three times as long as the 1920 trip. For his flight, he chose an SIAI S.16ter flying boat which he named Gennariello.

On 21 April 1925, Pinedo and his mechanic, Ernesto Campanelli, departed Rome aboard Gennariello. They stopped first at Brindisi in Italy, then at Leros in Greece; Baghdad in Iraq; Bushehr and Chabar in Persia; Karachi, Bombay, Cocanada, and Calcutta in British India; Akyab, Rangoon, Tavoy, and Mergui in Burma; Phuket in Siam; Penang in British Malaya; Singapore; Batavia, Surabaya, Sumbawa, and Kupang in the Netherlands East Indies, and Broome, Carnarvon, Perth, Bunbury, Albany, Israelite Bay, and Adelaide in Australia before reaching Melbourne, where they arrived on 10 June and spent 36 days.

On 16 July, Pinedo and Campanelli flew on to Sydney, where they spent another three weeks. Resuming their flight on 6 August, they visited Brisbane, Rockhampton, Townsville, Innisfail, Cooktown, and Thursday Island in Australia; Merauke, Dobo, Amboina, and Menado in the Netherlands East Indies; Cebu, Atimonan, Manila, and Aparri in the Philippines; Tamsui on Formosa; Shanghai in China; Mokpo in Korea; and Yamakawa and Kagoshima in Japan, before arriving in Tokyo on 26 September.

After a three-week stay in Tokyo, Pinedo and Campanelli began their return journey to Rome on October 17, a 15,000-mile (24,000-km) trip that they made in only 22 days with stops at Kagoshima in Japan; Shanghai in China; Hong Kong; Haiphong and Saigon in French Indochina; Bangkok in Siam; Rangoon in Burma; Calcutta, Benares, Delhi, and Karachi in British India; Bandar Abbas in Persia; Baghdad in Iraq; Alexandretta in Turkey; and Taranto in Italy before arriving in Rome on 7 November. The entire journey, made without special preparations for support at any of the stops and involving two long flights – of 600 miles (970 km) and 1,200 miles (1,900 km) – across the dry land of the Indian subcontinent in a non-amphibious flying boat, had proceeded without major incident and had required only one engine change, carried out at Tokyo. Pinedo and Campanelli had carried a jib sail and boat rudder to allow them to sail their flying boat through unfamiliar harbors in awkward winds, but they never used either the sail or the rudder during their expedition. The aviators had covered about 35,000 miles (56,000 km) in 370 hours of flight time in 80 stages over the course of 202 days, and a 1925 issue of the magazine Flight described their journey as "the most extensive aerial tour on record."

The Fédération Aéronautique Internationale gave Pinedo its highest award, the FAI Gold Air Medal, for the flight, the first time it had awarded the medal. The Regia Aeronautica promoted Pinedo to colonnello (colonel) upon his return from the flight, and Italy's King Victor Emmanuel III made him a marchese (marquis).

=== 1927 "Four Continents" flight ===
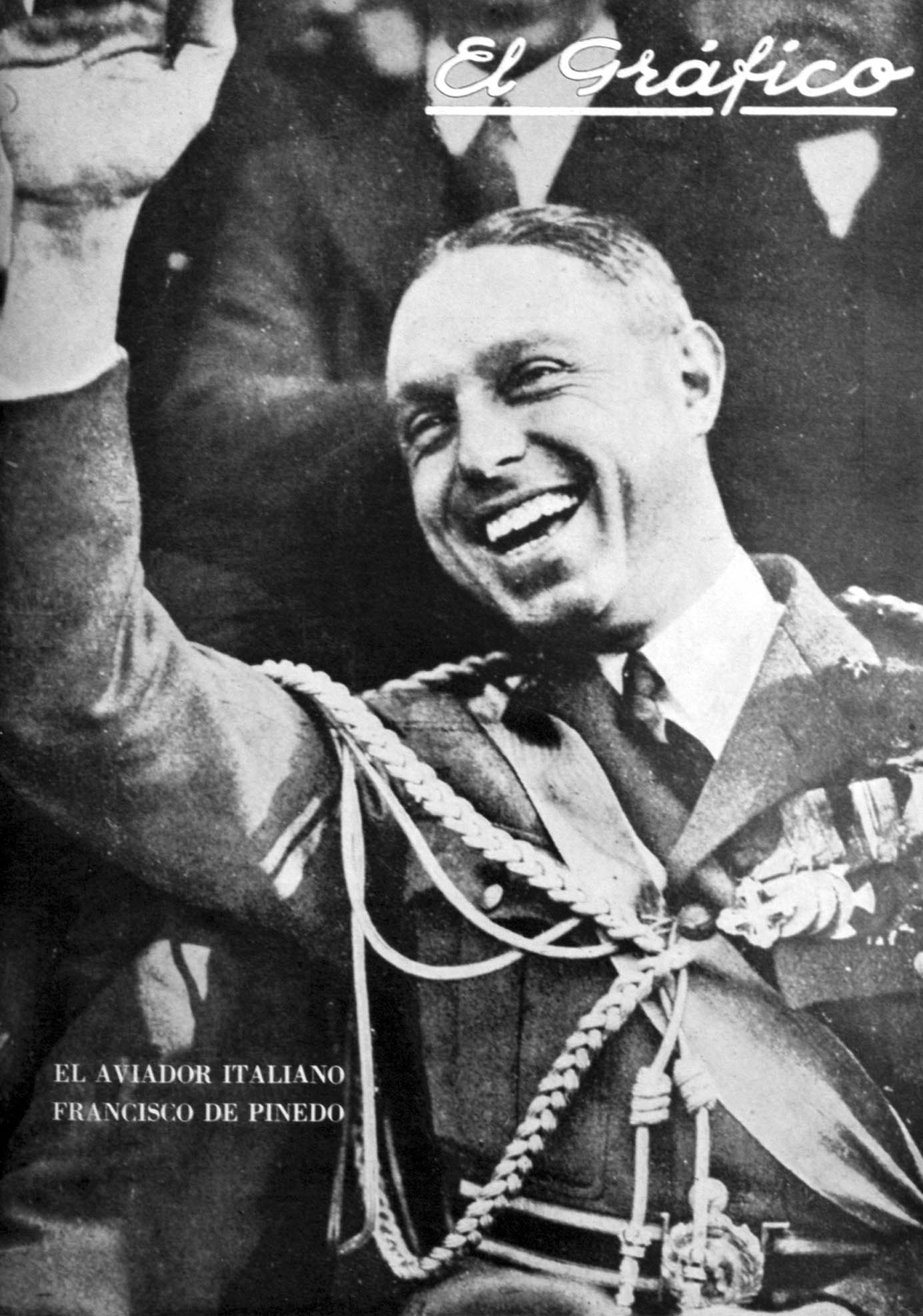
"Francisco" de Pinedo - El Gráfico 1927

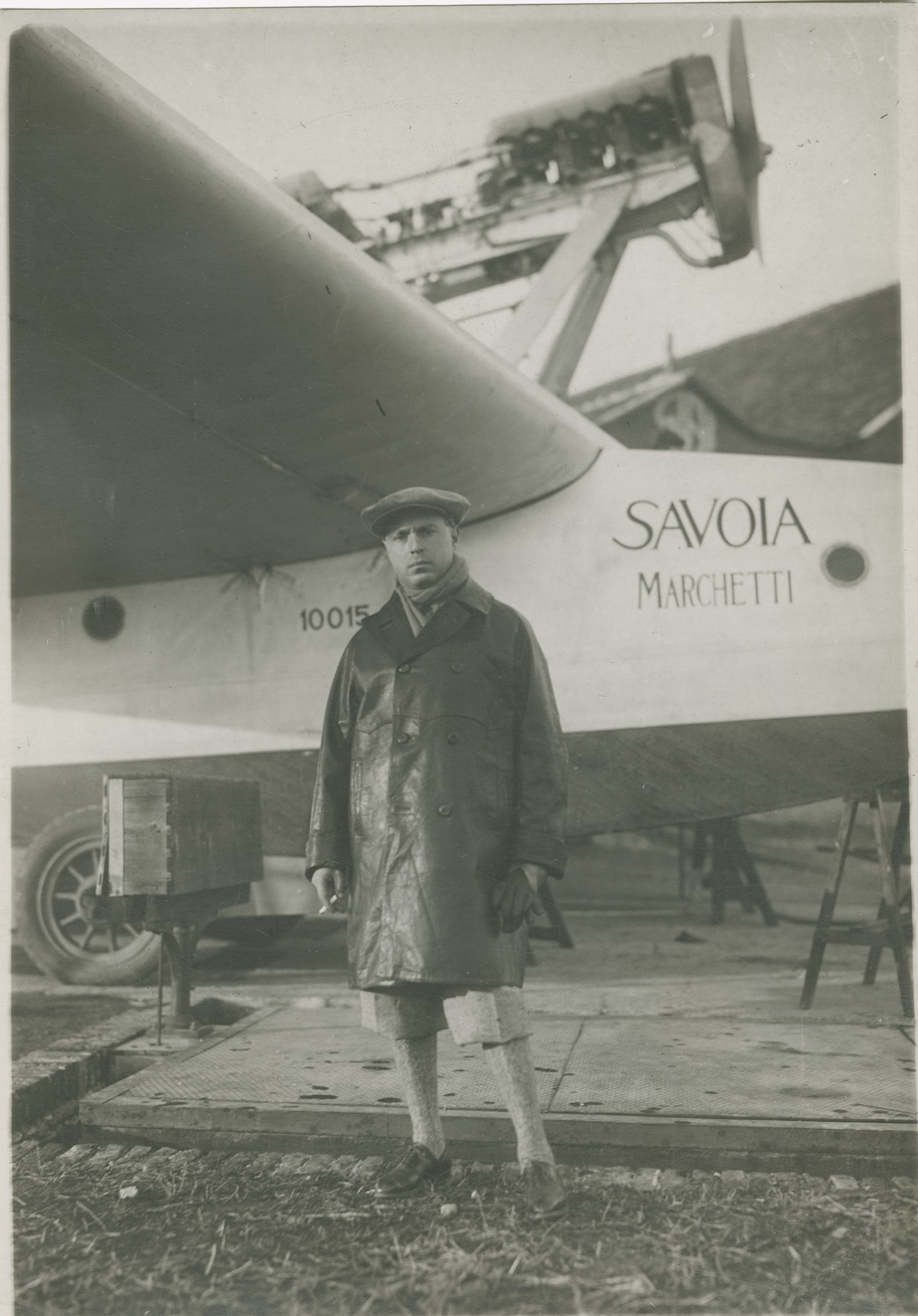
Francesco de Pinedo with a Savoia-Marchetti S.55

Mussolini suggested that Pinedo next make a flight to the Western Hemisphere to inspire pride in people of Italian ancestry who had emigrated to the Americas. This idea developed into the "Four Continents" flight of 1927, intended to demonstrate the ability of a flying boat to fly from Italy to Africa and across the Atlantic Ocean to Brazil, followed by several stops in South America and the Caribbean, a tour of the United States and Canada, and a transatlantic flight back to Europe ultimately ending in Rome.

Pinedo, his copilot Capitano (Captain) Carlo Del Prete, and mechanic Vitale Zacchetti embarked on the "Four Continents" flight in the Savoia-Marchetti S.55 flying boat Santa Maria under Pinedo's command. Leaving Cagliari, Sardinia, on 13 February 1927, they stopped at Villa Cisneros in Spanish Sahara and Bolama in Portuguese Guinea before attempting to take off from Bolama on 16 February to cross the Atlantic Ocean to Brazil. Sweltering conditions prevented their plane from becoming airborne until they dumped a large quantity of gasoline, forcing them to fly to the Cape Verde Islands instead, where cooler conditions prevailed. On 23 February, they finally made their Atlantic crossing, braving a storm and landing on the ocean near Fernando de Noronha, where the Brazilian Navy protected cruiser Almirante Barroso met them and towed them into port. The next day, after repairs necessitated by a collision with Almirante Barroso, they flew on to the mainland of Brazil, landing at Natal to begin the South American phase of the flight.

After stops at various cities in South America including Rio de Janeiro, Brazil, Buenos Aires, Argentina, Montevideo, Uruguay, and Asunción, Paraguay, the three Italians began a long leg over the dense jungle of Brazil's Mato Grosso region on 16 March 1927. At one point, a Brazilian river boat had to tow the Santa Maria for 200 miles (320 km) along the Paraguay River in search of a suitable takeoff area after a refueling stop, but on 20 March they completed their crossing of the Mato Grosso and landed at Manaós, Brazil. It was history's first flight over the Mato Grosso.

After a stop at Georgetown, British Guiana, and a crossing of the Caribbean with stops at Pointe-à-Pitre in Guadeloupe, Port-au-Prince in Haiti, and Havana in Cuba, Pinedo, Del Prete, and Zacchetti crossed the Gulf of Mexico and arrived at New Orleans, Louisiana, on 29 March 1927, the first time in history that a foreign airplane had flown into the United States. Pinedo's landing in New Orleans on the Mississippi River inspired the large Italian community, which lined the Mississippi River at his landing. A painting at the New Orleans Lakefront Airport memorializes the event.

They then flew through Louisiana, Texas, New Mexico, and Arizona, intending to reach San Diego, California, but during a refueling stop on Theodore Roosevelt Lake in Arizona an accidental fire broke out when a teenage volunteer helping to refuel the Santa Maria carelessly discarded a cigarette that ignited gasoline on the water's surface. The fire quickly spread to the plane and destroyed it; its engines sank 60 feet (18 m) to the bottom of the lake and were not recovered until 19 April. The three Italians then flew to San Diego as passengers on a United States Navy plane and traveled by train to New York City, where they arrived on 25 April 1927 to meet a new S.55 shipped there by the Italian Fascist government so that they could continue their flight.

The new plane – identical to the Santa Maria – arrived in New York by ship on 1 May 1927, and, after reassembly, was christened Santa Maria II on 8 May. Following a revised schedule Pinedo drew up that eliminated all stops west of the Mississippi River, Pinedo, Del Prete, and Zacchetti visited Boston, Massachusetts; Philadelphia, Pennsylvania; Charleston, South Carolina; Pensacola, Florida; and New Orleans before setting out on 14 May 1927 northward up the Mississippi River into the Midwestern United States. They stopped at Memphis, Tennessee, flew over St. Louis, Missouri, and stopped at Chicago, Illinois. They then flew into Canada, stopping at Montreal on 17 May 1927 after an 11-hour flight from Chicago.

Pinedo, Del Prete, and Zacchetti flew on to the Dominion of Newfoundland. On 22 May, they departed Trepassey Bay, planning to cross the Atlantic to the Azores, refuel, and then fly on to Portugal, retracing the transatlantic route of the United States Navy Curtiss NC-4 flying boat in 1919, but they ran low on fuel due to unfavorable weather. Pinedo was forced to land the Santa Maria II on the ocean and be taken under tow by a Portuguese fishing boat and an Italian steamer for the final 200 miles (322 km) to the Azores, where the plane arrived at Horta on May 30.

After a week of repairs, the three Italian aviators were airborne again in the Santa Maria II, flying back to the point in the Atlantic where they had been taken under tow, and then finishing their transatlantic flight from there. After stops in Portugal and Spain, Pinedo, Del Prete, and Zacchetti completed the "Four Continents" flight on 16 June 1927, landing Santa Maria II in Ostia's harbor outside Rome. Their 29,180 miles (46,960 km) flight had taken 124 days. After returning from the flight, Pinedo was promoted to generale di brigata aerea (air brigade general), and Mussolini declared him to be the Messaggero d'Italianita' (Messenger of Italy) and bestowed upon him the sobriquet "Lord of Distances". The United Kingdom awarded Pinedo its Air Force Cross for the "Four Continents" flight and the United States awarded its Distinguished Flying Cross to him by special act of Congress on May 2, 1928.

=== Mass-formation flights ===
Regia Aeronautica General Italo Balbo relied heavily on Pinedo's advice when planning and executing the mass formation flights – intended to improve the operational skills of Regia Aeronautica aircrews and ground crewmen, showcase the Italian aviation industry to potential foreign buyers of Italian-made aircraft, and enhance the prestige of Benito Mussolini's Italian Fascist government – for which Balbo became famous. Balbo led the first of these, a six-stage, 1,750-mile (2,818-km) circuit of the Western Mediterranean by 61 Regia Aeronautica seaplanes – 51 Savoia-Marchetti S.59bis and 10 Savoia-Marchetti S.55s – between May 25 and June 2, 1928. Promoted to generale di divisione aerea (air divisional general) and made deputy chief of staff of the Regia Aeronautica, Pinedo joined Balbo in leading the second mass-formation flight, a 3,300-mile (5,314-km) circuit of the Eastern Mediterranean in June 1929 by 35 Regia Aeronautica seaplanes – 32 Savoia-Marchetti S.55s, two Savoia-Marchetti S.59s, and one CANT 22 – with stops at Taranto, Italy; Athens, Greece; Istanbul, Turkey; Varna, Bulgaria; Odessa in the Soviet Union; and Constanta, Romania. Pinedo and Balbo later had a falling out after Balbo decided that the Italian government would support no more long-distance flights by single aircraft, which Pinedo preferred, and would instead focus its efforts on mass formation flights, and Pinedo played no role in Balbo's January 1931 mass-formation crossing of the South Atlantic Ocean.

=== Later career ===
After the "Four Continents" flight, Pinedo increasingly carried out duties in diplomatic and administrative posts that kept him out of the headlines. Balbo's prominence in the Italian Fascist movement meant that Pinedo's break with him led to declining fortunes for Pinedo in his Regia Aeronautica career. In his final tour of duty with the Regia Aeronautica, he served as Italy's air attaché in Argentina, after which he was placed on leave.

Fearing that he would fall into obscurity and wishing to pursue long-distance flights by single aircraft of the type that Balbo would not support, Pinedo resigned from the Regia Aeronautica in 1933. He traveled to New York City under the pseudonym "Mr. Smith", purchased a Bellanca monoplane, and let it be known that he intended to fly nonstop from New York to Baghdad, Iraq, to set a new world nonstop flight distance record of some 6,300 miles (10,100 km).

== Death ==
When Pinedo attempted to take off from Floyd Bennett Field in Brooklyn, New York, on 2 September 1933 for his flight to Baghdad with his Bellanca overloaded with fuel, he lost control of the aircraft. Unable to detach from the airstrip, the plane veered off the runway, flipped onto its right side and crashed. Thrown from his seat, Pinedo quickly attempted to reach back to the controls in order to turn off the smoldering plane's engine, but at the same moment, fuel vapors ignited. He perished in the resulting fire, which also destroyed the plane. The takeoff attempt, crash, and fire all were captured on film. Pinedo's body was burned beyond recognition in the fire.

At New York, memorial services for Pinedo were held at St. Patrick's Cathedral in Manhattan while American military planes circled overhead. The Italian ocean liner MS Vulcania transported his remains to Italy. After his coffin reached Rome, a full state funeral with military honors took place.

== Bibliography ==
- Longo, Don (Donato), "'A Feat Without Parallel,: Pioneer Italian Aviators Fly to Adelaide, 1925", Italian Cernevale Magazine (Adelaide, South Australia, 2014), pp. 54–55.
- Uphaugh, Johnny de (January 2013). "Francesco de Pinedo: Lord of the Distances". The Aviation Historian (2): 14–25. ISSN 2051-1930.
