= History of Delta Air Lines =

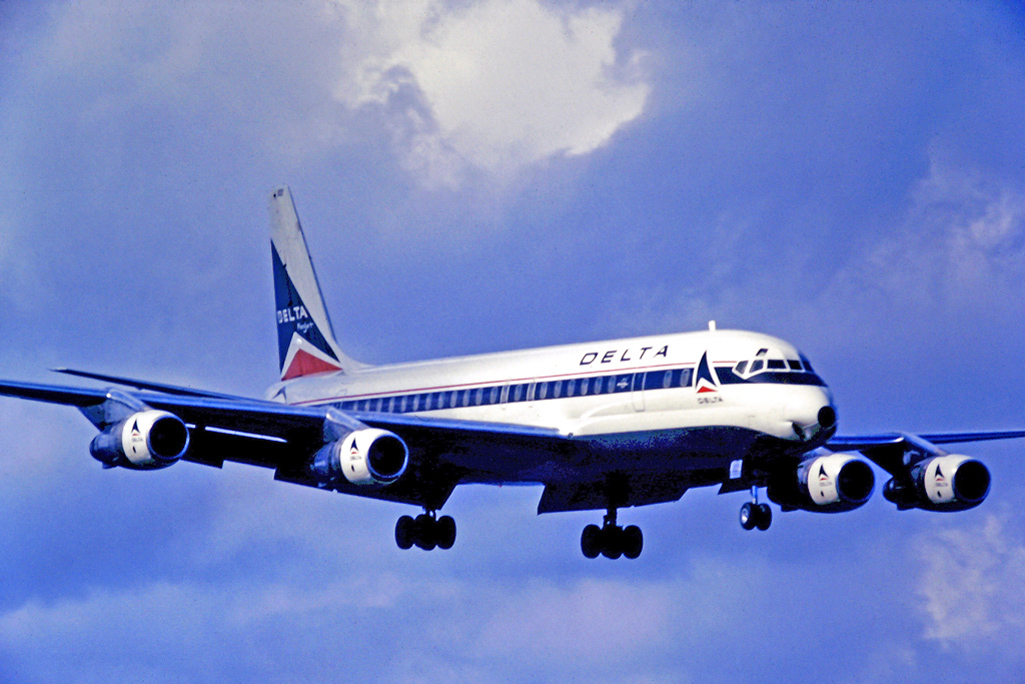
Douglas DC-8-51 flown by Delta Air Lines, landing at Miami International Airport in 1971

Current Delta Air Lines logo since 2007

Delta Air Lines is a major American airline. The history of it predecessor companies begins with the world's first aerial crop dusting operation called Huff Daland Dusters Inc., founded on March 2, 1925 in Macon, Georgia to combat the boll weevil infestation of cotton crops. C.E. Woolman, general manager and later Delta's first CEO, led a group of investors to acquire the company's assets. Delta Air Service was incorporated on December 3, 1928, and named after the Mississippi Delta region.

Passenger operations began on June 16, 1929, from Dallas, Texas, to Jackson, Mississippi, soon extending east to Atlanta and west to Fort Worth, Texas. Passenger service ceased in October 1930 when the air mail contract for the route Delta had pioneered was awarded to another airline. Woolman and other investors incorporated the former crop-dusting assets of Delta Air Service as Delta Air Corporation in 1930. The company began doing business as Delta Air Lines, carrying mail from Fort Worth to Charleston, South Carolina. The company's name was officially changed in 1945.

Through the 1950s and 1960s, Delta was the first airline to fly the Douglas DC-8, Convair 880, and McDonnell Douglas DC-9 aircraft. By 1970, it had an all-jet fleet. Trans-Atlantic service began in 1978 with the first nonstop flights from Atlanta to London. In 1990, Delta was the first airline in the United States to fly McDonnell Douglas MD-11 jets. It became the leading trans-Atlantic airline after acquiring the majority of Pan American World Airways' trans-Atlantic routes.

The company filed for bankruptcy in 2005, citing rising fuel costs. It emerged from bankruptcy in 2007 after fending off a hostile takeover from US Airways. In 2008, Delta acquired Northwest Airlines, which continued to operate as a wholly owned subsidiary of Delta until December 31, 2009. The two companies' computer reservations systems and websites were combined in 2010, and the Northwest Airlines brand was officially retired.

== Timeline ==
=== 1925 through 1940 ===
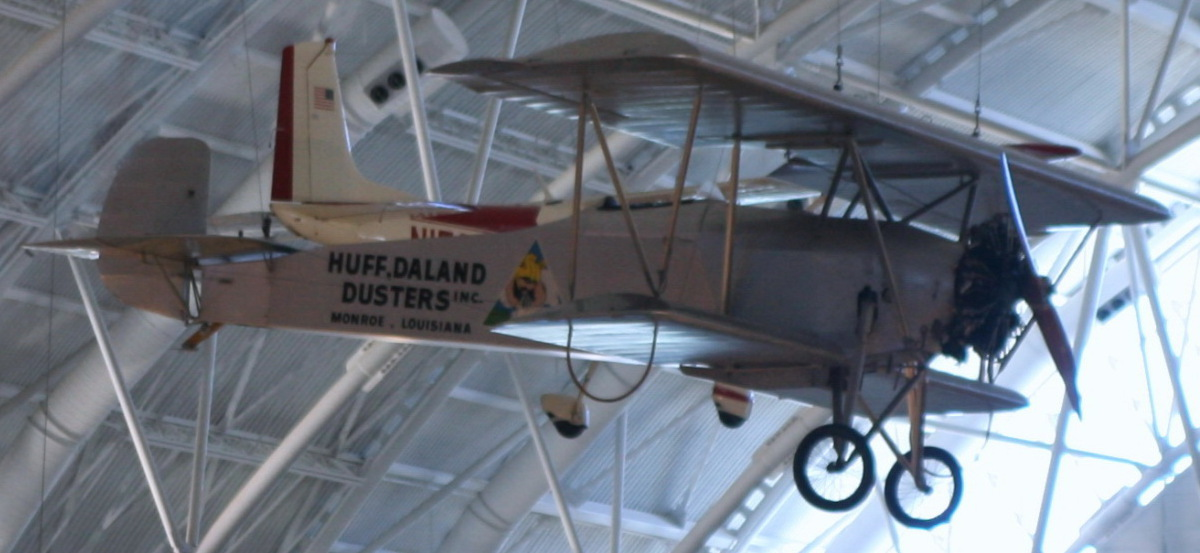
A restored Huff Daland Duster

Delta's origins can be traced to an agricultural and aviation effort that came together in the early 1920s to find a solution to the boll weevil infestation that was destroying cotton crops. Entomologist B. R. Coad led a team of researchers at the U.S. Department of Agriculture's field laboratory in Tallulah, Louisiana, and with loaned Army pilots and aircraft developed improvements that determined "dusting" of insecticide powder from the air would be the most effective form of treatment. Working with Coad, an aircraft manufacturing company (Huff-Daland Aero Corporation) built the world's first airplane designed for crop-dusting and formed a subsidiary, Huff Daland Dusters Inc., to market and operate that new service. It was founded on 2 March 1925, in Macon, Georgia, and became the world's first aerial crop dusting company. The company moved to Monroe, Louisiana, in summer 1925. C.E.Woolman left his position with Louisiana State University's Agricultural Extension Dept and in the off-season traveled with the company to Peru, where they helped to establish crop-dusting and passenger services. With this experience, Woolman returned to the United States and in 1928, he led a group of local investors to acquire Huff Daland Dusters assets.

The new company was named Delta Air Service, with its headquarters in Monroe. La. The name Delta, referring to the Mississippi Delta region, was suggested by Catherine FitzGerald, a secretary who later would rise to the rank of an executive in the company. On 17 June 1929, Delta Air Service began flying 5-passenger Travel Airs from Dallas, Texas, to Jackson, Mississippi, with stops in Shreveport and Monroe, Louisiana. By June 1930, Delta's route had expanded eastward to Atlanta, the fastest-growing city in the South, and westward to Fort Worth, Texas.

This service was terminated in October 1930 after the "Spoils Conference", when the Post Office awarded the route to an American Airlines predecessor. Delta's lack of success in winning a commercial airmail contract—the bread and butter of any aspiring airline—jeopardized its existence. Delta Air Service suspended passenger service, and sold its assets to its competitor. Local banker Travis Oliver, acting as trustee, C.E. Woolman and other local investors purchased back the crop-dusting assets of Delta Air Service and incorporated as Delta Air Corporation on December 31, 1930.

A reprieve came for Delta on the heels of the "airmail scandal", when the U.S. Congress enacted the Air Mail Act of 1934. C.E. Woolman secured a low-bid contract for the new Mail Route 24, flying used Stinson "T" Trimotors, with a route from Charleston, South Carolina, to Fort Worth, with stops in Columbia, Augusta, Atlanta, Birmingham, and Meridian along the way. Mail service began July 4, 1934, and passenger service on August 5. Doing business as Delta Air Lines.

=== 1940s and 1950s ===
In 1941, Delta moved its headquarters from Monroe to Atlanta.

Until 1941, Delta's network was an unbranched string of twelve cities from Fort Worth to Charleston SC. That December it scheduled ten departures a day at Atlanta: three to Ft Worth, one to Birmingham and two each to Cincinnati, Charleston and Savannah. Those ten flights and their returns were Delta's whole schedule.

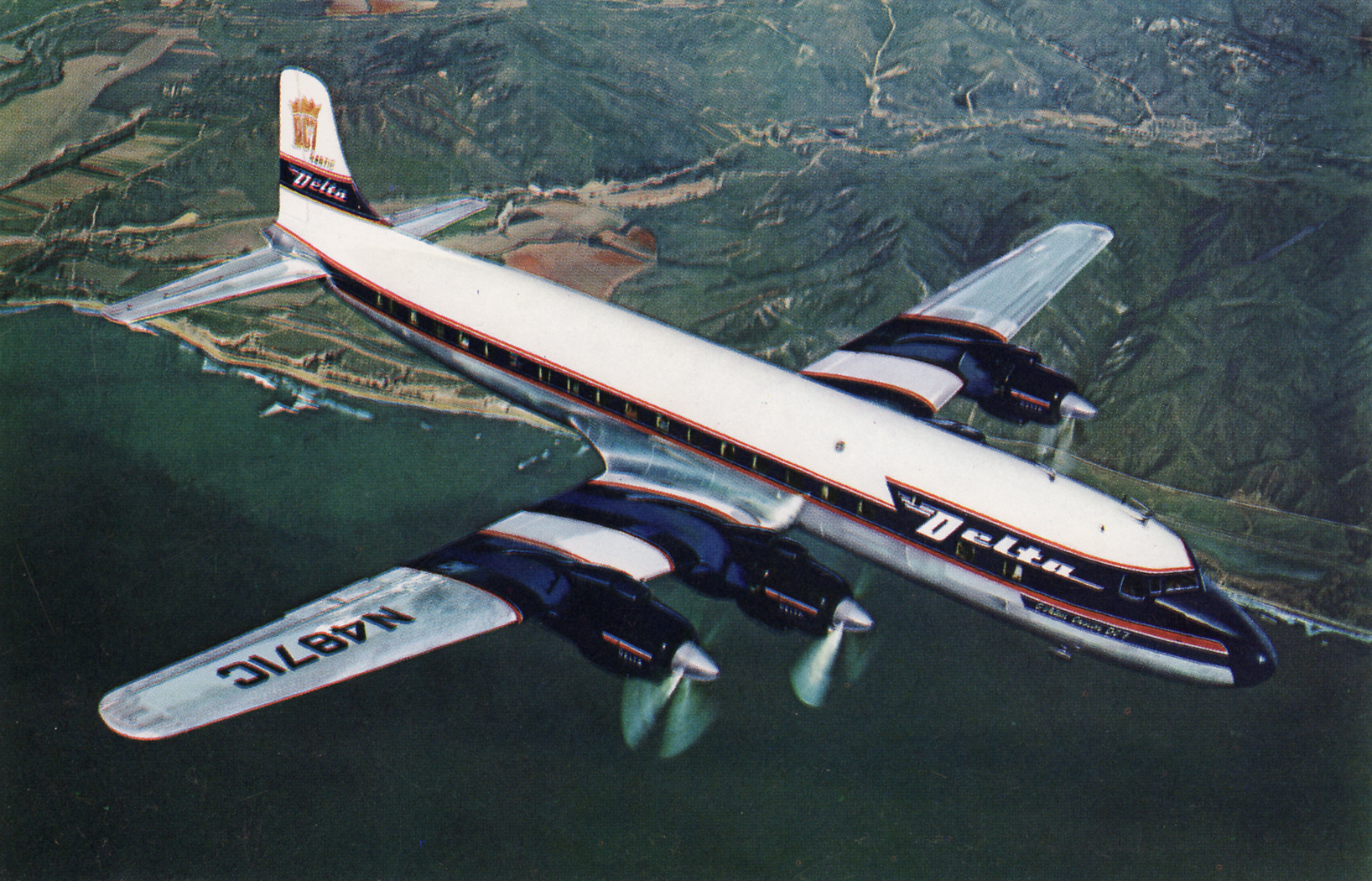
A Delta Douglas DC-7, circa 1955

Delta's routes started extending north and south. In 1943, Delta added service to New Orleans, and in 1945 Chicago and Miami. The company name officially became Delta Air Lines in 1945. Regularly scheduled cargo service began in 1946.

Delta purchased Chicago and Southern Air Lines in 1953 and flew under the name Delta-C&S for the next two years. This added a north–south network from Chicago and Detroit to Houston and New Orleans – and Delta's first international route, New Orleans to Caracas via Havana. The network expanded to Washington DC and New York in 1956; like Braniff, Delta initially flew only to Newark, but between 1957 and 1958 both airlines added flights to Idlewild. Delta had no direct flights between the Northeast and Florida until it merged Northeast Airlines in 1972.

Revenue Passenger-Miles (Millions)(Sched Service Only)
	Delta	Northeast	C&S
1951	402	88	200
1955	1008	116	(merged DL)
1960	1870	565	
1965	4304	666	
1970	9713	1856	
1975	16460	(merged)	

=== 1960s and 1970s ===
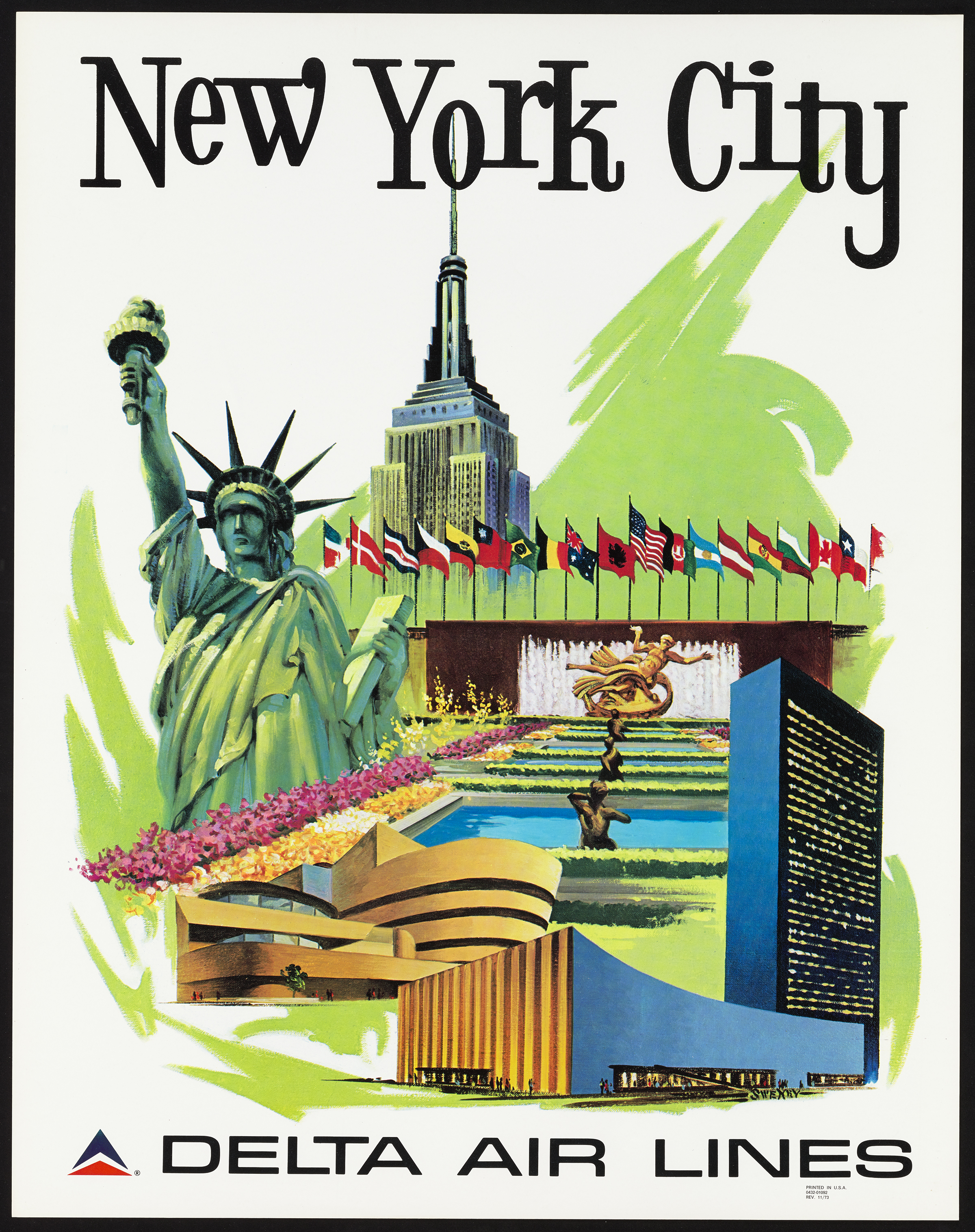
An advertisement for service to New York City in the 1960s.

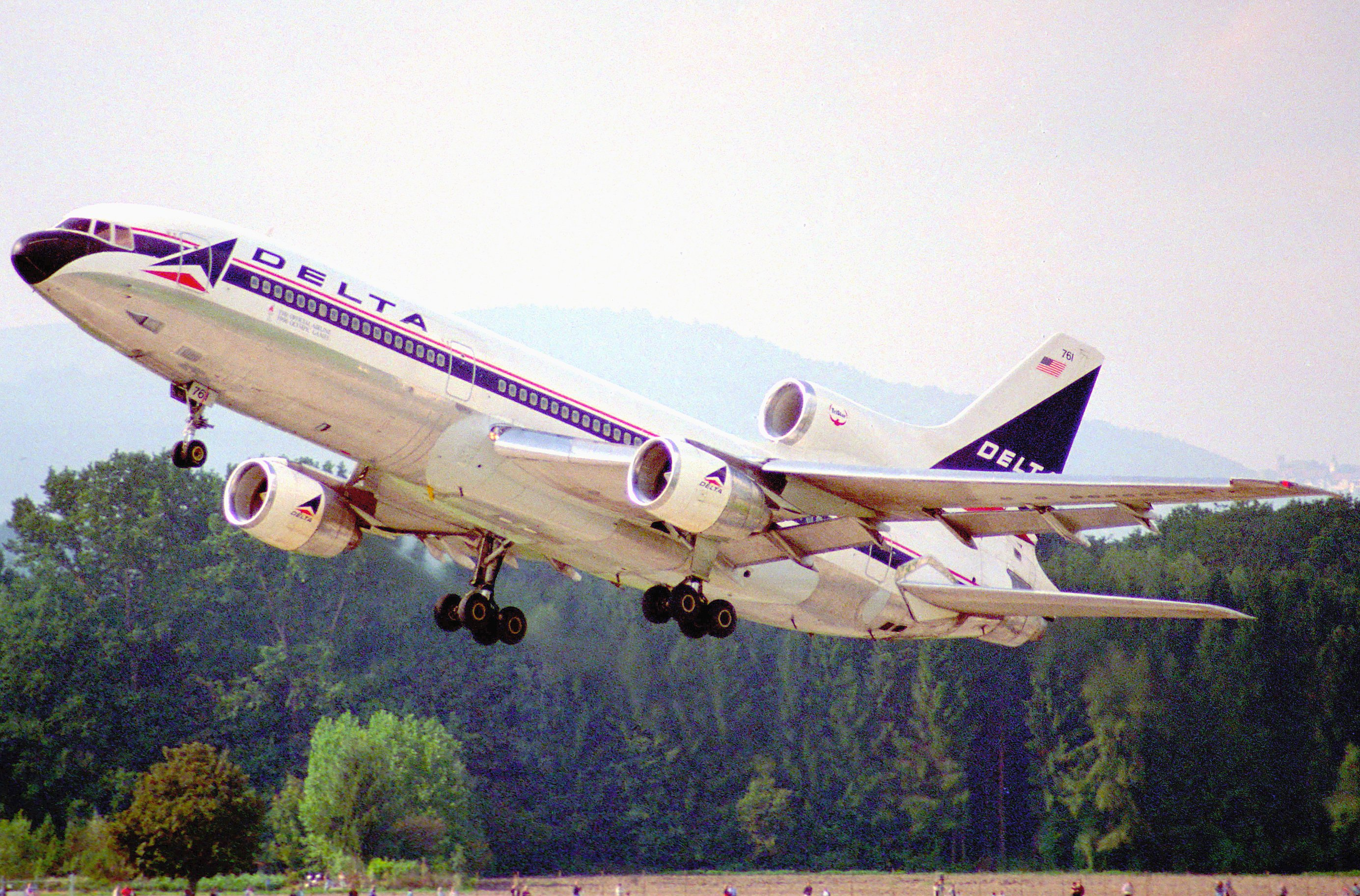
A Delta L-1011 Tristar 500

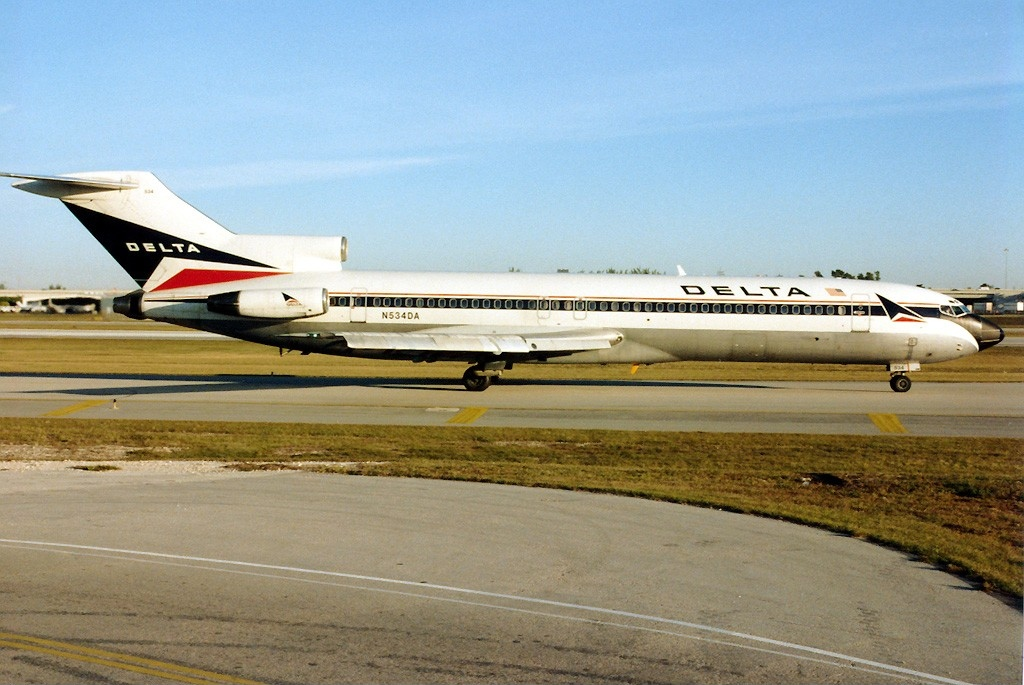
Delta was the largest operator of the Boeing 727 at one point.

Delta added jet airliners to its fleet in the 1960s; the Douglas DC-8 entered service in September 1959. Delta's new red, white, and blue triangle logo (the "widget") on their aircraft represented the jet's swept wing, as well as the Greek letter delta. Convair 880s were added in 1960 (they set a coast-to-coast record) and in 1965 the DC-9. Delta became an all-jet airline in 1970.

In 1961, Delta's routes expanded west with the first nonstop service between Atlanta and California. Delta acquired Northeast Airlines in 1972. Delta purchased some Boeing 747-100s, which were later sold to China Airlines in favour of the Lockheed L-1011. Trans-Atlantic service began in 1978 with the first nonstop service from Atlanta to London.

=== 1980s ===
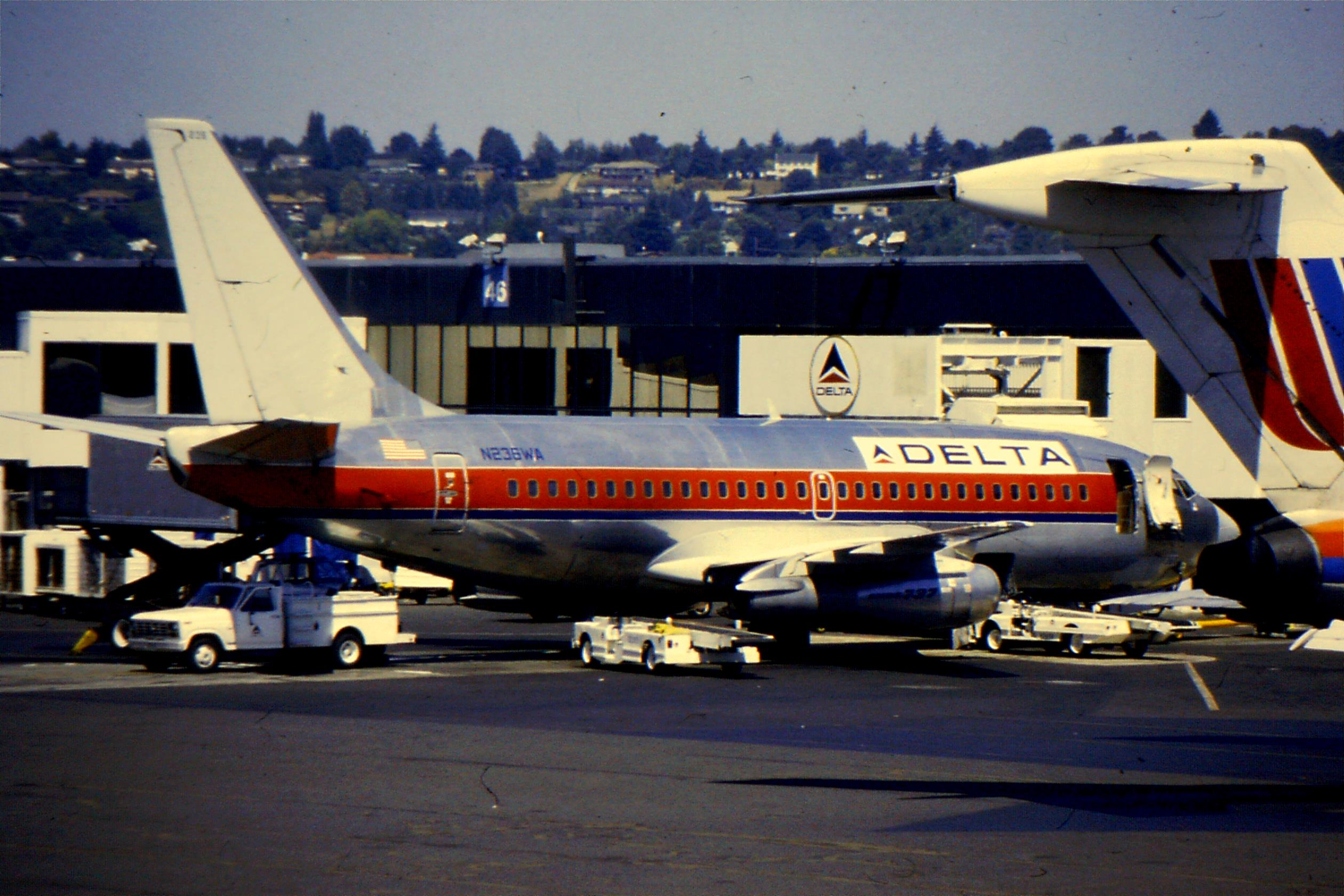
A Boeing 737-200 in a hybrid Western/Delta livery at Portland International Airport in 1987

Delta launched its first frequent flyer program in 1981 which became the SkyMiles program in 1995. In 1982, the airline acquired its first Boeing 737s. Also in December 1982, Delta took delivery of its first 757 and 767–200, named the Spirit of Delta, which was paid for "by voluntary contributions from employees, retirees and Delta's community partners." The effort, called Project 767, was spearheaded by three Delta flight attendants to show the employees' appreciation to Delta for solid management and strong leadership during the first years following airline deregulation." The airplane remained in the Delta fleet until 2006, and was repainted in a commemorative paint scheme and toured the country to celebrate the airline's 75th anniversary in 2004. In 1987, Delta merged with Western Airlines, inheriting Western's hubs in Salt Lake City and Los Angeles, while Ron Allen became CEO of the combined airline. Trans-Pacific service began in 1987 (Atlanta-Portland, Or.-Tokyo).

=== 1990s ===
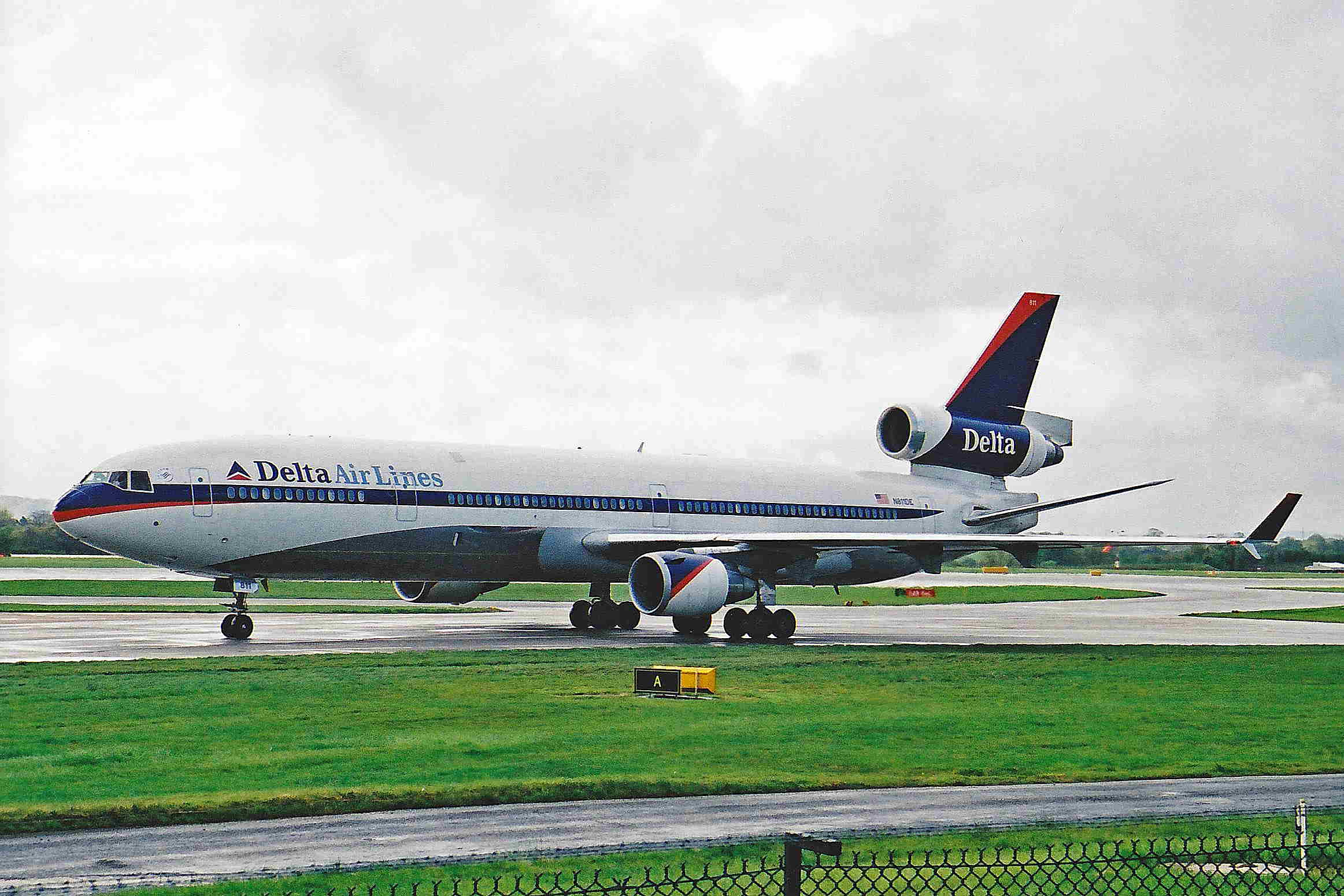
A Delta Air Lines McDonnell Douglas MD-11 in 1997–2000 livery, more commonly referred to as the Ron Allen scheme. The last mainline aircraft in this livery was repainted to the current livery as of July 2008.

In 1990, Delta became the first U.S. airline to operate the McDonnell Douglas MD-11 aircraft, leasing two from Mitsui.

Delta expanded dramatically by purchasing most of Pan Am's European routes after Pan Am declared bankruptcy in 1991. Delta initially explored a joint divvying-up of Pan Am's assets with United Airlines where Delta would take over the New York-based European operations and United would take over the Miami-based Latin American operations, but the two carriers reached a major disagreement over which would assume the Pan Am Miami-London route. On 1 September, Delta acquired Pan Am's East Coast and European routes including intra-European routes from the Frankfurt hub, (IGS routes to and from Berlin were acquired by Lufthansa) and assumed a controlling interest in the remainder of Pan Am, which continued to operate routes from Miami to London, Paris and Latin America. The total price for these assets was $1.3 billion.

Although Delta initially promised further equity injections to keep Pan Am afloat, it decided not to do so a month later, which forced Pan Am to cease operations on December 4, 1991. United purchased the remaining assets of Pan Am a few days later, including transatlantic routes from Miami, for a total of $135 million.

The Pan Am creditors' committee sued Delta for more than $2.5 billion on 9 December. In December 1994, a federal judge ruled in favor of Delta, concluding that it was not liable for Pan Am's demise.

The Pan Am transaction gave Delta the largest transatlantic route network among U.S. airlines. Because of these acquisitions, Delta became and remains the largest U.S. transatlantic carrier, in terms of passengers carried and the number of flights operated. The ex-Pan Am routes acquired by Delta included Detroit to London, despite Northwest Airlines' objections due to Delta's small presence in Detroit and Northwest's comparatively larger operations. Northwest later attempted to buy USAir's (later US Airways) Baltimore-London route for $5 million and transfer the route to Detroit but ended up buying the route from Delta in 1995.

Throughout the 1990s, Delta maintained a secondary hub at Portland for its Asia operations. In addition to regularly scheduled flights to Delta's primary hubs during this time (Atlanta, Cincinnati, Dallas, and Salt Lake City), several of Delta's flights to Asia were routed from Portland and Los Angeles, using L-1011 and MD-11 aircraft. Destinations included Bangkok, Fukuoka (resumed 28 December 2011 from Honolulu as a seasonal route), Hong Kong, Manila, Nagoya, Seoul, Taipei, and Tokyo (resumed 3 June 2009 replacing Northwest Airlines route). Delta was one of the airlines targeted in the failed Operation Bojinka plot: the conspirators planned to bomb a Delta MD-11 flying from Seoul to Bangkok via Taipei on 21 January 1995.

In 1997, Delta achieved an unprecedented milestone in the airline industry: the first airline to board more than 100 million passengers in a single year. Delta also began an expansion of US-Latin America routes.

In 1998, Delta and United Airlines introduced a marketing partnership that included a reciprocal redemption agreement between SkyMiles and Mileage Plus programs and shared lounges. This scheme allowed members of either frequent flier program to earn miles on both carriers and utilize both carriers' lounges. Delta and United attempted to introduce an even closer codeshare agreement, but this was deal was effectively killed by ALPA.

=== 2000s ===
In 2000, Delta partnered with AeroMéxico, Air France, and Korean Air to form SkyTeam, a global alliance. Three years later, Delta began the largest domestic codeshare alliance with Continental Airlines and Northwest Airlines. Today SkyTeam is the second largest airline alliance in the world (after Star Alliance).

Delta's short-lived Los Angeles focus city was significantly reduced in 2008, ending the build up toward hub status as Delta went from a high of 48 destinations from the airport to just 17.

=== Fleet transformation in the early 2000s ===
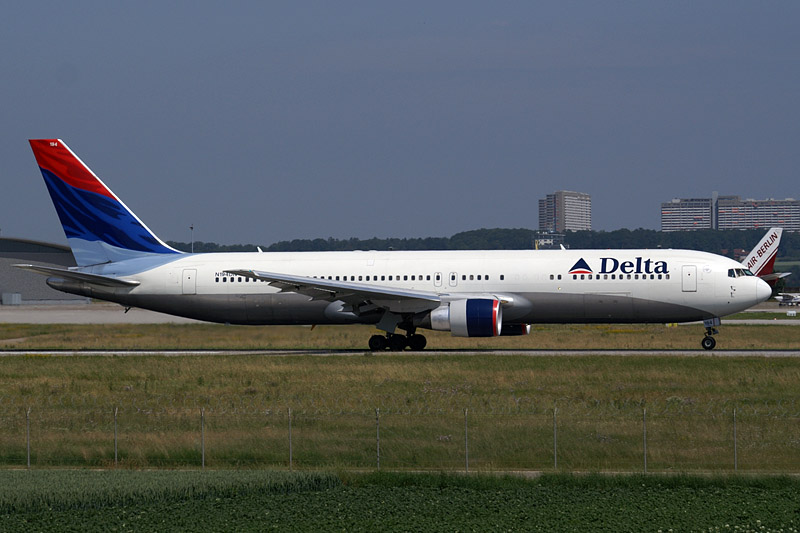
A Delta Boeing 767-300ER at Stuttgart, Germany (2006)

In an effort to simplify its fleet and capitalize on cross-platform compatibility, not only in pilot training but also maintenance, the airline began to retire its trijets (three-engine planes) in favor of twinjets (two-engine planes). Delta's entire active fleet is now composed of twinjets. The airline is now the world's largest operator of 767 aircraft.

- The Lockheed L-1011 was, for many years, the workhorse of the fleet and backbone of Delta's international network, numbering as high as 56 in service at one time. The last L-1011 (N728DA) was retired on July 31, 2001. The final flight operated as Flight 1949 from Orlando to Atlanta. The Lockheed L-1011's were replaced with the Boeing 767–400.
- The airline's many Boeing 727s were completely replaced with Boeing 737–800s in 2003.
- Delta operated its last MD-11 flight on 1 January 2004, operating as Flight 56 from Narita International Airport to Atlanta. This concluded the MD-11s relatively short service in the fleet. MD-11 aircraft have been replaced with Boeing 777-200ERs. On September 23, 2004, a Delta spokesperson confirmed plans to sell 8 MD-11s to FedEx Express. The remainder MD-11s were either sold to World Airways for charter use or converted to freighters for UPS Airlines.

=== Bankruptcy ===
As early as 2004, in an effort to avoid bankruptcy, Delta began restructuring the company, which included cutting 7,000 jobs and aggressively expanding Atlanta operations by adding 100 new flights, making it a "super-hub" and requiring the airline to spread its flight schedule more evenly throughout the day.

On August 15, 2005, in an SEC filing, Delta finalized a deal to sell Delta Connection carrier Atlantic Southeast Airlines (ASA) for $425 million in cash to SkyWest Airlines in an effort to obtain money to avoid bankruptcy. Analysts called the move a desperate one, estimating ASA's worth at around $700–$800 million – a price which SkyWest would not have been willing to pay.

Delta sought protection from its creditors under Chapter 11 of the U.S. Bankruptcy Code on September 14, 2005, via a filing with the U.S. Bankruptcy Court for the Southern District of New York, in Manhattan; the company's liabilities included some $28.27 billion of total debt. Coincidentally, rival carrier Northwest Airlines also sought Chapter 11 protection that same day via a filing with the same court; Delta and Northwest would eventually merge several years later, after both companies had restructured and had emerged from bankruptcy, with Delta as the surviving corporate entity.

In December 2005, Delta cut 26% of its flights at its Cincinnati hub and redeployed the aircraft to its hubs in Atlanta and Salt Lake City.

=== Reorganization during bankruptcy ===
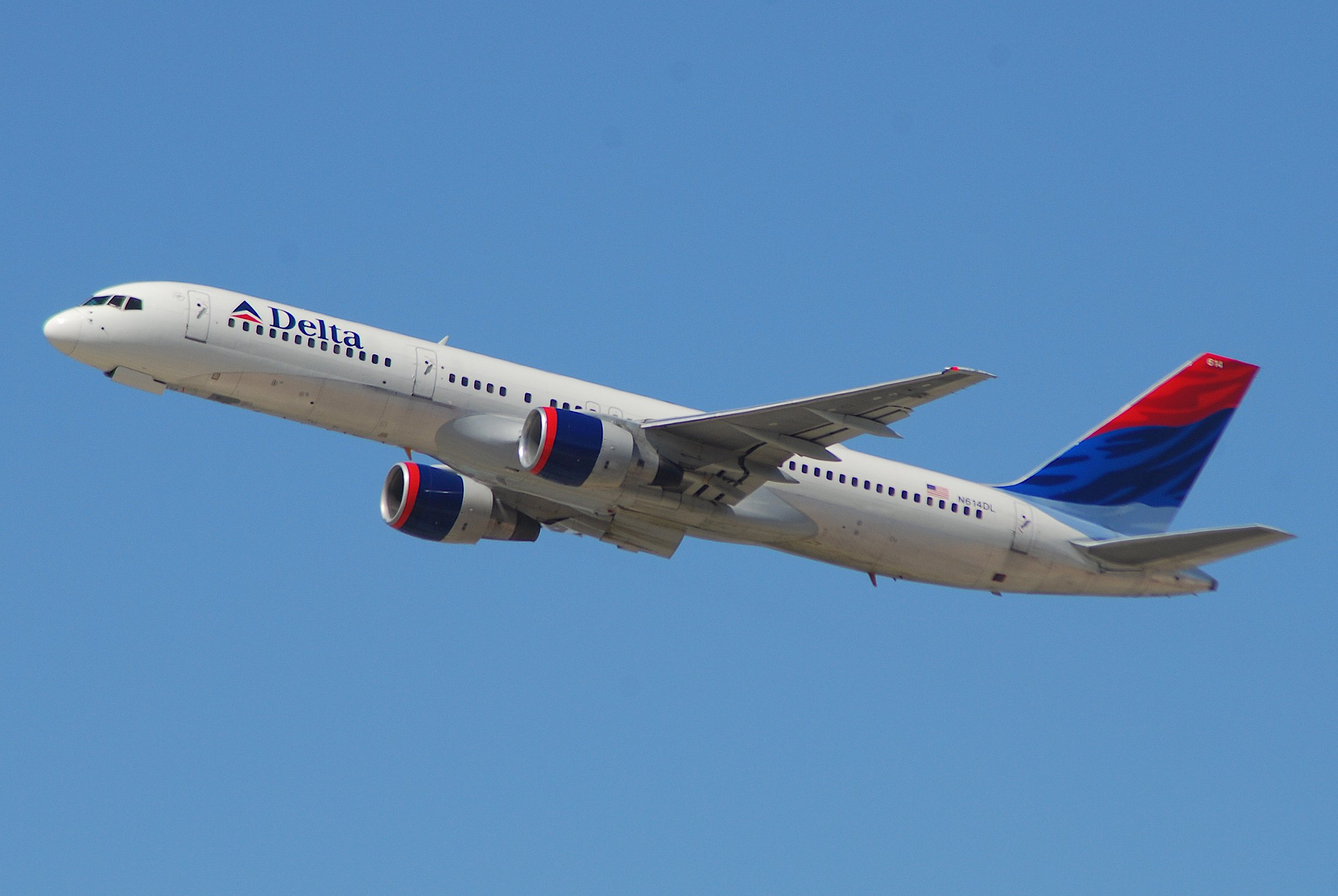
Boeing 757–200 in the livery used from 2000 to 2007

In 2005, Delta accelerated its restructuring, targeting an additional $3 billion per year in cost reductions by 2007. Of that, $970 million was to come from debt relief, lease and facility savings, and previously commenced fleet modifications. Non-union workers' salaries were to be reduced by a minimum of 9% across the board, with a 15% reduction for executive officers and a 25% pay cut for CEO Gerald Grinstein. In December 2005, the Delta pilots agreed to an additional temporary 14% cut in pay, piggybacking onto the 32.5% taken at the beginning of 2005. This cut was made permanent with the ratification of an agreement in June 2006. Additionally, the company planned to lay off between 7,000 and 9,000 of its 52,000 employees.

In 2006, Delta purchased rights to fly between New York City and London (Heathrow) from United Airlines.

On February 24, 2006, Delta, along with Continental Airlines and FedEx Express, saw future operations to Venezuela severely affected by President Hugo Chávez's decision to restrict flights coming into that South American country from the United States.

Based on all of these new initiatives, Delta projected a return to profitability by late 2007, based on a crude oil price model of $66 per barrel, in contrast to other bankrupt carriers' restructuring modeled on $55 per barrel. Delta would eventually reach this goal of full year profitability in 2007.

Starting in 2007, Delta began offering on-demand programming on all flights longer than four hours at its main hubs in New York City, Salt Lake City, and Atlanta. This countered entertainment offerings of other airlines like JetBlue Airways, and took after Song's services. Live programming and music are free, and movies are available on demand for a nominal fee in coach and for free in first class. Delta also installed an improved in-flight entertainment system on internationally configured aircraft, featuring a personal selection of movies. The system was installed in all classes on Boeing 767-400ER and 777-200ER aircraft, and in the BusinessElite section on Boeing 767-300ER aircraft.

On November 9, 2006, the airline recalled 1,000 flight attendants that were previously laid off. Delta also exhausted its pilot recall list and, in December 2006, began accepting pilot applications for the first time in 5 years. They expected to take on close to 200 first officers through 2007.

=== Failed takeover attempt by US Airways ===
On November 15, 2006, Bloomberg reported that US Airways Group, the parent of US Airways, proposed a takeover of Delta for $8 billion in cash and stock.

In addition to Delta management, Delta employees appeared to be extremely skeptical of US Airways management's claims that a merger would result in no job reductions and provide a more secure future for a combined entity. Employees had started wearing "Keep Delta My Delta" buttons and campaigning to raise public awareness of their opposition to the proposed takeover.

On December 19, 2006, Delta rejected US Airways Group's proposed merger. The airline also launched a media campaign against the merger to raise public support. The campaign, "Keep Delta My Delta", was picked up from the employee grassroots effort of the same name. The effort's website harbored an e-petition, quotes from prominent dissidents, and the effects the merger could have on selected localities. In its report, Delta cited many reasons for rejecting the bid, including it would lead to worse customer service, possible layoffs, an inefficient carrier, the carrier with the largest debt-load in the industry, and near-monopoly powers.

On December 20, 2006, Delta and its financial advisor, the Blackstone Group, declared that Delta would be valued at between $9.4 billion and $12 billion after emerging from bankruptcy, which would (at the time of this writing) give it a market capitalization comparable to that of Southwest Airlines Co. or greater than that of American Airlines' AMR Corp. and Continental Airlines, Inc. combined. US Airways Group CEO Doug Parker stated that Delta's self-valuation lacked credibility and was unrealistic. Delta CEO Gerald Grinstein retorted by stating that the Tempe-based airline was "the worst of all potential merger partners".

On January 10, 2007, US Airways raised its bid by 20%, to $10.2 billion. The revised offer was set to expire by 1 February unless Delta's creditors opened the airline's books to US Airways and delayed a scheduled 7 February court hearing pertaining to Delta's reorganization plan. Delta responded with a statement, claiming that "...the revised proposal does not address significant concerns that have been raised about the initial US Airways proposal and, in fact, would increase the debt burden of the combined company by yet another $1 billion." That same day Delta Air Lines was speculated to be in talks with Continental Airlines, Northwest Airlines and United Airlines to fend off the US Airways bid. CEO Gerald Grinstein, however, denied that any serious negotiations were ongoing with Northwest or any other airline.

On January 28, 2007, US Airways holding company raised its bid by another $1 billion according to the Wall Street Journal, but company spokesmen denied any change. On January 31, 2007, Delta's creditors rejected US Airways' hostile takeover attempt, and US Airways withdrew its offer to buy Delta. On the same day, executives and employees of the company gathered to celebrate the re-lighting of the historic "FLY DELTA JETS" sign at the company's main hub, Hartsfield-Jackson Atlanta International Airport.

=== Emergence from bankruptcy ===
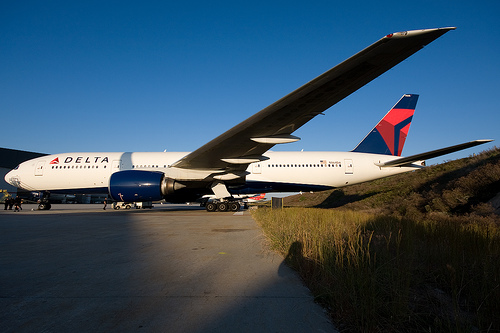
Delta Air Lines Boeing 777-200ER in its current livery.

On April 25, 2007, the airline's bankruptcy plan was approved by the bankruptcy court. On April 30, 2007, Delta Air Lines emerged from bankruptcy protection as an independent carrier. Delta also unveiled a new logo, reminiscent of its logo from the 1970s and 1980s, and a new paint scheme.

Delta's previous stock was canceled as of Monday, April 30, 2007, and new shares are trading on a "when issued" basis on the New York Stock Exchange. These shares began trading normally on Thursday, May 3. 2007. The starting price was around $20.00 a share, and went up to as high as $23.35. But investors showed little confidence in the stock as the price fell to $19.00 later in the week.

Upon exiting bankruptcy, Delta increased operations at Los Angeles International Airport by 50%, thus establishing Los Angeles as Delta's second West Coast hub and new potential Asian gateway with a total of 99 daily departures.

=== Post-bankruptcy ===
On May 10, 2007, Delta began a partnership with US Helicopter, who provides service from John F. Kennedy International Airport to several helipads in downtown Manhattan.

On July 12, 2007, Delta and its SkyTeam partners forfeited slots in the European Union to relieve antitrust concerns.

On August 21, 2007, Delta named Richard Anderson, former CEO of Northwest Airlines and executive at UnitedHealth Group, as a replacement for outgoing CEO Gerald Grinstein. Anderson assumed the post on 1 September.

On November 14, 2007, Pardus Capital Management LP, a hedge fund that owns 7 million shares of Delta and 5.6 million shares of United, called for the two carriers to merge. This action sent shares of both airlines up. However, the two airlines quickly denied official talks of any merger.

==== Merger with Northwest Airlines (2008) ====
Most common symbol for the merger.

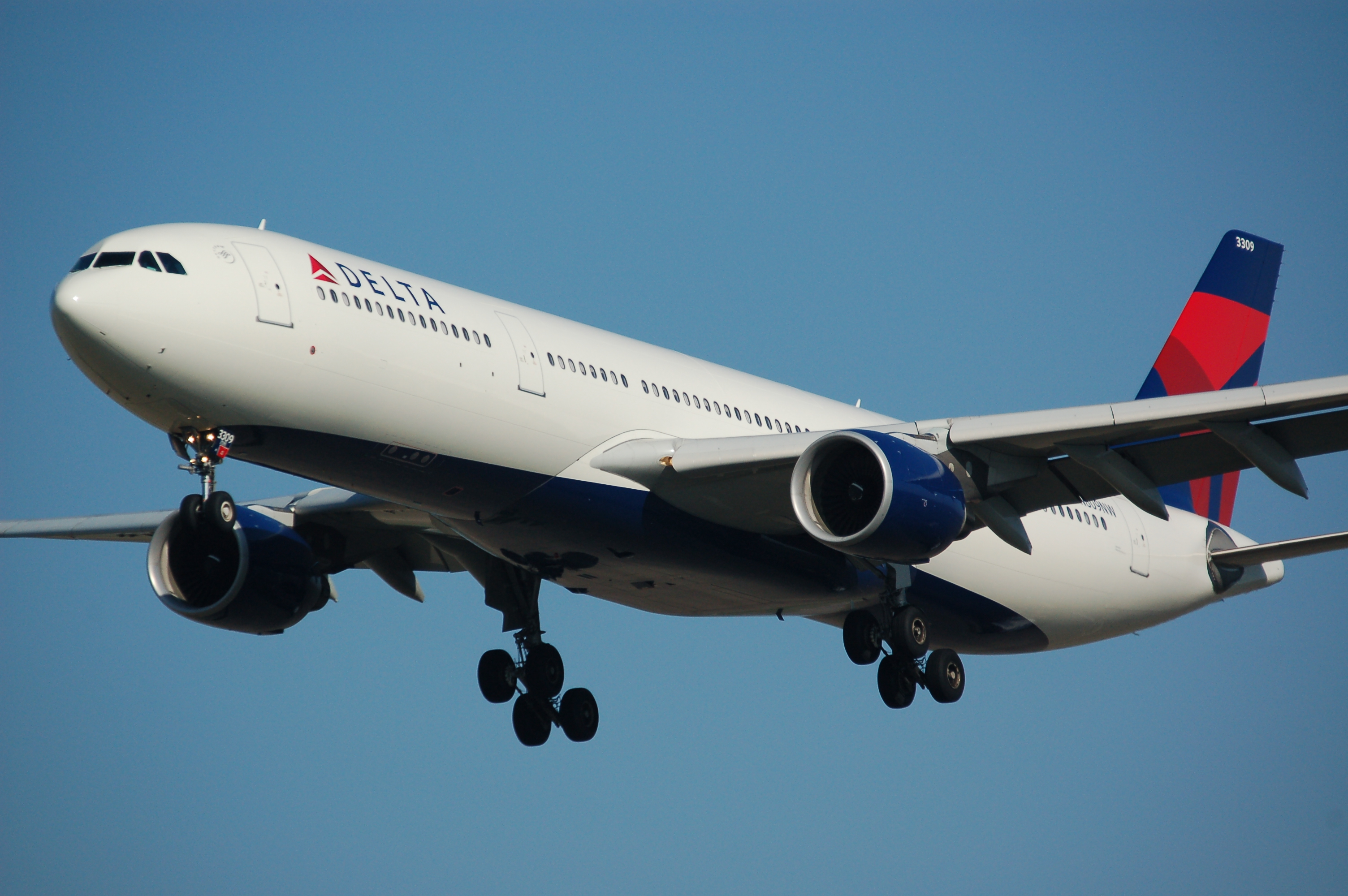
A Northwest Airlines Airbus A330-300 painted in Delta livery as a result of the merger

On April 14, 2008, following merger talks first reported on January 15, 2008, Delta and Northwest Airlines announced that they would merge to create the world's largest airline under the Delta name.

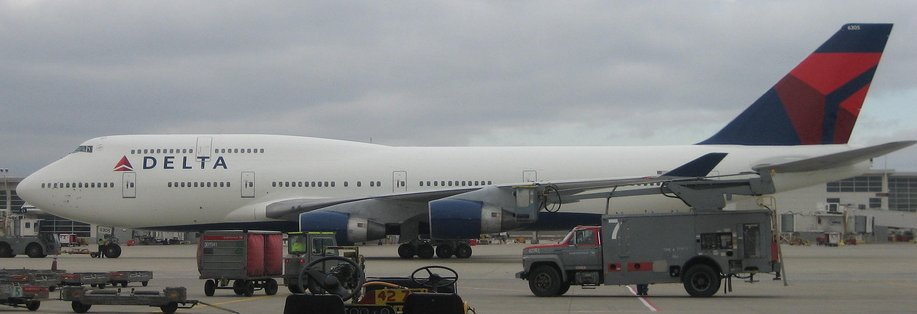
A Delta Boeing 747-400, inherited from the Northwest merger

The deal passed anti-trust overview from the Department of Justice; as most analysis expected, the deal was not blocked, due to the minimal overlap between the two airlines' routes and very little threat to competition in the industry. The merger was also expected to be the subject of several hearings on Capitol Hill. Representative Jim Oberstar of Minnesota, who also serves as chair of the House Committee on Transportation and Infrastructure, made clear his opposition to the merger, and he fought it in Washington. There was also strong support for the merger at the Capitol from legislators from Georgia, including Representative Lynn Westmoreland, Representative David Scott, and Senator Johnny Isakson. On 7 August 2008, the merger won regulatory approval from the European Union.

After a six-month investigation, government economists concluded the merger would likely drive down costs for consumers without curbing competition. On 29 October 2008, the United States Department of Justice approved the merger between Delta Air Lines and Northwest.

The merger formed the then-largest commercial airline in the world, with 786 aircraft. At the time of the merger, the combined airline had $17.7 billion enterprise value. The company also stated on 14 April 2008 that it agreed with its pilot union to extend the existing collective bargaining agreement through the end of 2012. The agreement, subject to a vote by the pilots, provides Delta pilots a 3.5 percent equity stake in the created new airline.

Northwest WorldPerks was merged into Delta SkyMiles on 1 October 2009. Operating certificates were merged on 31 December 2009. Reservations systems were merged on 31 January 2010, officially retiring the Northwest brand.

All of Northwest's aircraft were eventually repainted in Delta's livery. Northwest's three US hubs were rebranded and gates have been consolidated along with other US airports. In airports where Northwest and Delta operated in separate terminals, one airline moved to another's terminal. In May 2012 the final group of employees and flight attendants began to work together. They had previously voted No to Union representation.

=== 2010s ===
==== Japan Airlines shareholder negotiations ====
In an effort to expand Delta's Tokyo hub operations at Narita International Airport after the merger with Northwest, on 11 September 2009, Japan's NHK reported that Japan Airlines (JAL) was seriously considering allowing Delta to become a majority shareholder. However, JAL is a member of Oneworld, which is rival to Delta's SkyTeam alliance. In addition, it was reported that JAL was in talks with Delta's partner, Air France-KLM, and JAL's Oneworld partner and Delta's rival, American Airlines, for equity investments in the airline.

On 4 January 2010, the Yomiuri Shimbun reported that JAL and the Japanese government-backed Enterprise Turnaround Initiative Corporation of Japan would likely choose to form a business and capital tie-up with Delta, and that JAL would enter the SkyTeam alliance as part of the deal. The move, according to the report, would reduce JAL's international flight operations in favor of codeshare agreements with Delta. The report also said that American Airlines had begun procedures to end negotiations with JAL. A JAL spokesman denied the report, stating that negotiations with Delta and American were continuing.

Yomiuri reported, on 16 January 2010, that Delta had reached an agreement with JAL on a tie-up consisting mostly of code-sharing flight services. JAL and Delta intended to sign the agreement after JAL's bankruptcy protection proceedings began, and both airlines would apply for antitrust immunity with the United States Department of Transportation. Also, JAL announced that it would leave Oneworld and would join the SkyTeam alliance. JAL was expected to officially announce the tie-up with Delta and the switch from Oneworld to SkyTeam on 1 February 2010, the day Delta's and Northwest's reservation systems would merge.

On 8 February 2010, Japan Airlines chose to remain partners with American Airlines and stay in Oneworld, ending talks with Delta.

==== China Eastern Airlines partnership ====
In 2015 the airline entered a partnership with China Eastern Airlines in which Delta will buy a 3.55% share in China Eastern for $450m.

==== Grounding of flights in 2016 ====
In August 2016 thousands of airline flights were delayed or cancelled due to a technology issue. Tens of thousands of people were stranded worldwide.

==== 2017–2018 ====
In September 2017, Delta flight 431 from San Juan to New York's JFK became famous for fleeing Category 5 Hurricane Irma just before it made landfall on the island of Puerto Rico.

In October 2018, Delta Air Lines received their first Airbus A220-100, N101DU, in an order of 75 jets.

==== 2019 ====
In September 2019, Delta announces a partnership with LATAM Airlines Group in which Delta will buy a 20% share in LATAM for $1.9 billion and invest $350 million in the partnership to help LATAM unwind its ties with Oneworld. Delta also will dispose its 9% stake in Gol Transportes Aéreos. It is unclear whether LATAM will join SkyTeam once exiting Oneworld, but Group CEO Ignacio Cueto stated that LATAM will not join SkyTeam for now.

=== 2020s ===
==== 2020 ====
Following a reduction in demand for air travel due to the global COVID-19 pandemic, on March 13 Delta Air Lines announced it would reduce its flight capacity by 40 percent. Additionally, Delta will defer deliveries, cut capital costs by $2 billion, and park up to 600 aircraft.

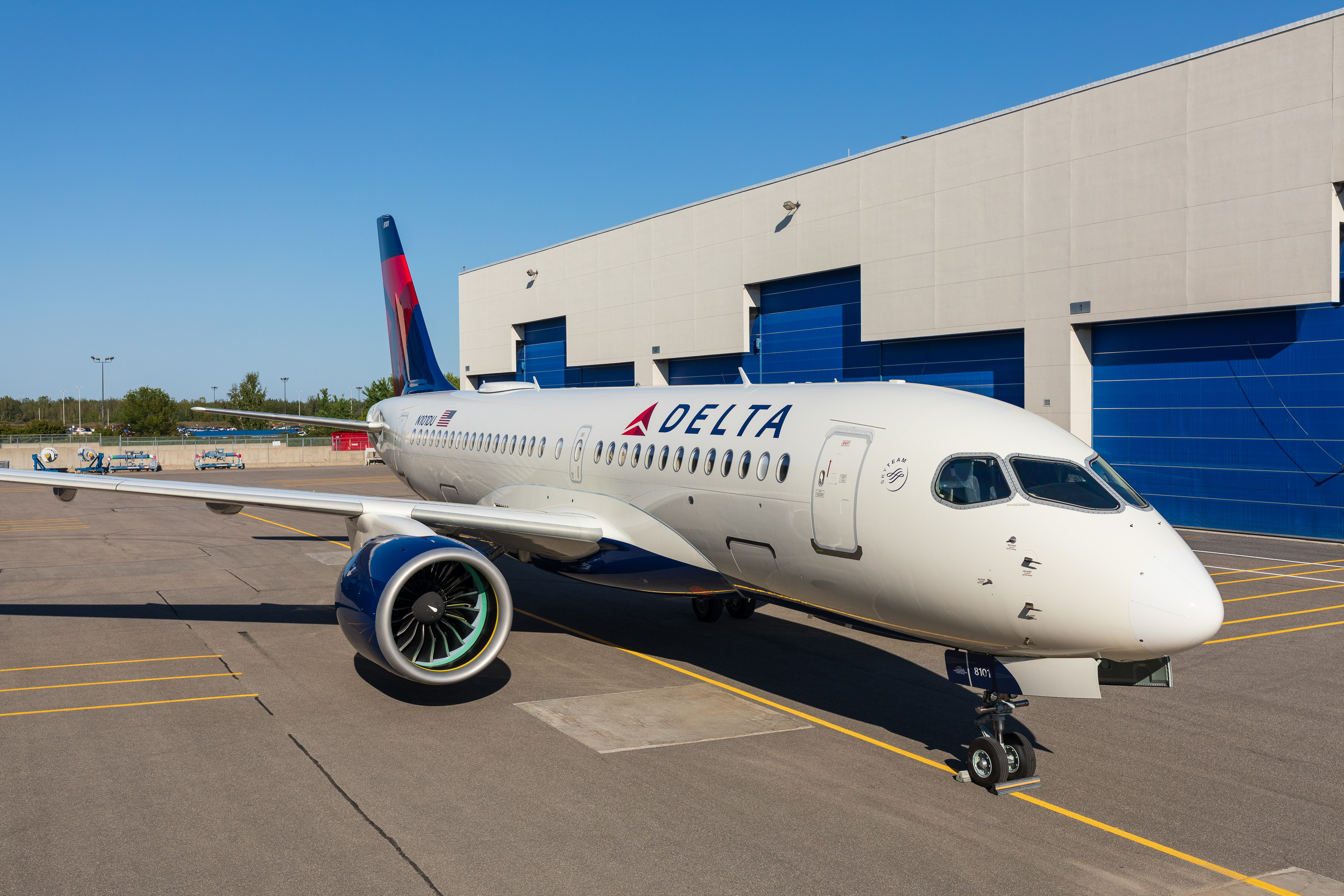
N101DU, Delta's first Airbus A220, on rollout date – 26.10.18.

On June 2, 2020, all MD-88 and MD-90 aircraft were retired.

In October 2020, Delta Air Lines and Canadian airline WestJet submitted a joint venture proposal to the U.S. D.O.T. The department responded with a number of conditions, including taking WestJet's ULCC subsidiary Swoop out of the joint venture and the divesting of 16 takeoff and landing slots at New York's LaGuardia Airport. Both airlines withdrew their applications finding the conditions "unreasonable and unacceptable." However, on 23 July 2021, WestJet's CEO Ed Sims announced that the two airlines were still going ahead with a new and revised joint venture application.

==== 2021 to present ====
After suffering losses due to the restrictions on the industry from the COVID-19 pandemic the year prior, Delta reported its first quarterly profit during its second quarter of $652 million, breaking its five-quarter loss streak. Despite the upturn in profits, the company still remains 55% below the $1.4 billion accumulated in its 2019 second-quarter, as flight schedules remain unfilled. Airport travel rose greater than initially projected by Delta, raking in 20% more daily net cash sales than expected. The company reported it would acquire 29 used Boeing 737s and leasing seven used Airbus A350s, expected to be delivered next year, in anticipation of a growing market.

In May 2023, a class-action lawsuit was filed against Delta Air Lines for misleading the public in relation to its carbon neutrality claims. The case was largely dismissed on the grounds that the plaintiff did not have intent to be a customer of Delta and was not being harmed by the airline.

On July 19, 2024, Delta was the hardest hit of the U.S. major airlines by the 2024 CrowdStrike incident, with over 1,200 flights cancelled that day alone. Thousands of stranded travelers were forced to spend the night sleeping on the floor in the terminals at Hartsfield–Jackson. Unlike other airlines, Delta experienced a week-long disruption, leading to the United States Department of Transportation (DOT) investigating the airline and to multiple lawsuits between Delta, Crowdstrike and DOT.

== Predecessors ==
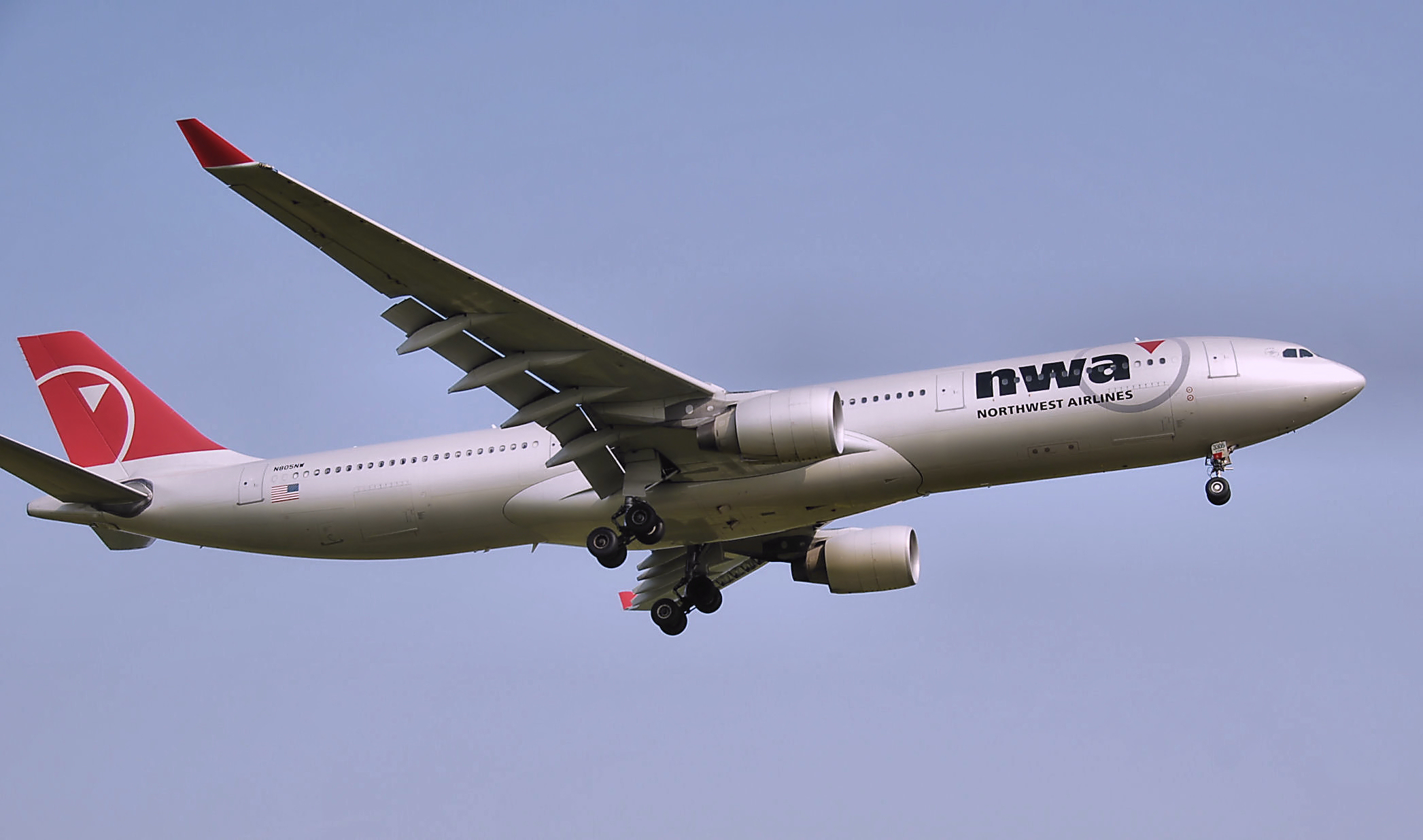
A Northwest Airlines Airbus A330-300, shortly before the merger with Delta in 2008

Delta Air Lines as it exists today is the result of numerous mergers over its history. Predecessor carriers include:

- Chicago and Southern Air Lines (formed in 1933, merged into Delta in 1953). Delta flew under the carrier name of Delta-C&S for the following two years.
- Northeast Airlines (formed in 1931, merged into Delta in 1972)
- Northwest Airlines (formed in 1926, merged into Delta in 2008. Also known as Northwest Orient Airlines from 1950 to 1986)
  - Republic Airlines (formed in 1979, merged into Northwest Airlines in 1986)
    - Hughes Airwest (formed in 1968 as Air West as a result of a three way merger of Bonanza Air Lines, Pacific Air Lines and West Coast Airlines, name change to Hughes Airwest in 1970, merged into Republic Airlines in 1980)
      - Bonanza Air Lines (formed in 1945, merged into Air West/Hughes Airwest in 1968)
      - Pacific Air Lines (formed in 1941, merged into Air West/Hughes Airwest in 1968)
      - West Coast Airlines (formed in 1941, merged into Air West/Hughes Airwest in 1968)
    - North Central Airlines (formed in 1944 as Wisconsin Central Airlines, name change to North Central Airlines in 1952, merged into Republic Airlines in 1979)
    - Southern Airways (formed in 1944, merged into Republic Airlines in 1979)
- Pan American World Airways (formed in 1927, upon its bankruptcy in 1991 Delta bought a selection of Pan Am's assets and routes and merged them into its operations)
  - Atlantic, Gulf, and Caribbean Airways (formed in 1927, merged into Pan American World Airways in 1928)
  - American Overseas Airlines (formed in 1937, merged into Pan American World Airways in 1950)
  - Aviation Corporation of the Americas/American International Airways (formed in 1926, merged into Pan American World Airways in 1928)
  - National Airlines (formed in 1934, merged into Pan American World Airways in 1980)
- Western Airlines (formed in 1925, merged into Delta in 1987)
  - Standard Air Lines (formed in 1927, merged into Western Airlines in 1930)

=== Defunct Delta subsidiaries ===
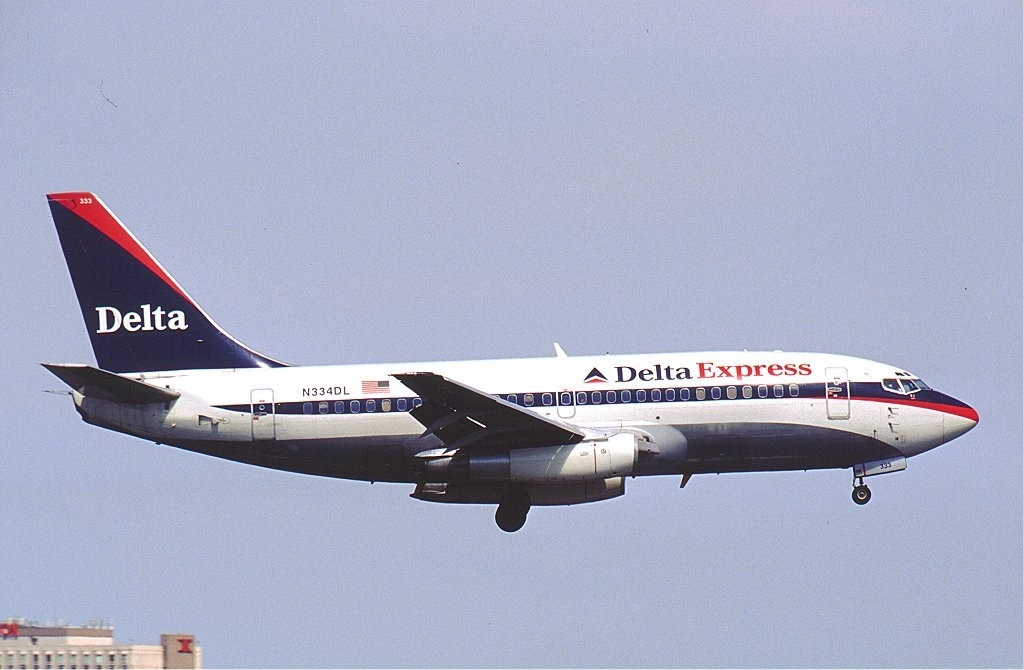
Delta Express Boeing 737 in 2001

- Comair began services in March 1977 and was headquartered at Cincinnati/Northern Kentucky International Airport. After successfully introducing 50-seat planes into the United States, it was acquired by Delta in October 1999. Comair became the main carrier of Delta Connection and operated over 400 daily flights from Cincinnati/Northern Kentucky International Airport throughout the U.S., Mexico, and Caribbean. Comair ceased operations on 29 September 2012, and was folded into Delta Connection operations.
- Delta Express began service in October 1996 in an attempt by Delta to compete with low cost airlines on leisure-oriented routes. Its main base of operations was Orlando International Airport and it used Boeing 737–200 aircraft. It ceased operations in November 2003 after Song was established.
- Song began service on 15 April 2003 as a single-class airline operated by Delta to compete directly with JetBlue Airways from both airlines' hub at New York–JFK. While the brand was considered a successful addition to the Northeast-to-Florida market, financially the airline suffered. On 1 May 2006, Song was folded into the Delta mainline brand. Song used Boeing 757 aircraft.
- Delta Private Jets began services in 1984 to provide private aviation service from the Cincinnati/Northern Kentucky International Airport. On January 31, 2020, Delta Private Jets was merged with Wheels Up.
- Aerosim Flight Academy began in 1987 as a flight school for prospective pilots wishing to enter a career as a commercial airline pilot. In 2017, it was sold to L3 Technologies.

== Livery and branding ==
For much of the airline's early history, each aircraft type in the fleet wore a distinct paint scheme, with orange appearing as a common accent color. By the late 1930s, aircraft predominantly appeared in natural metal with red and blue accents, which would be further refined into the 1940s. From the late 1940s onward, aircraft were generally painted with a white upper fuselage and red-and-blue cheatlines, with details varying among fleet types. With the introduction of the airline's first jets in 1959, the Douglas DC-8 and Convair 880 were again given bespoke liveries not used on other types.

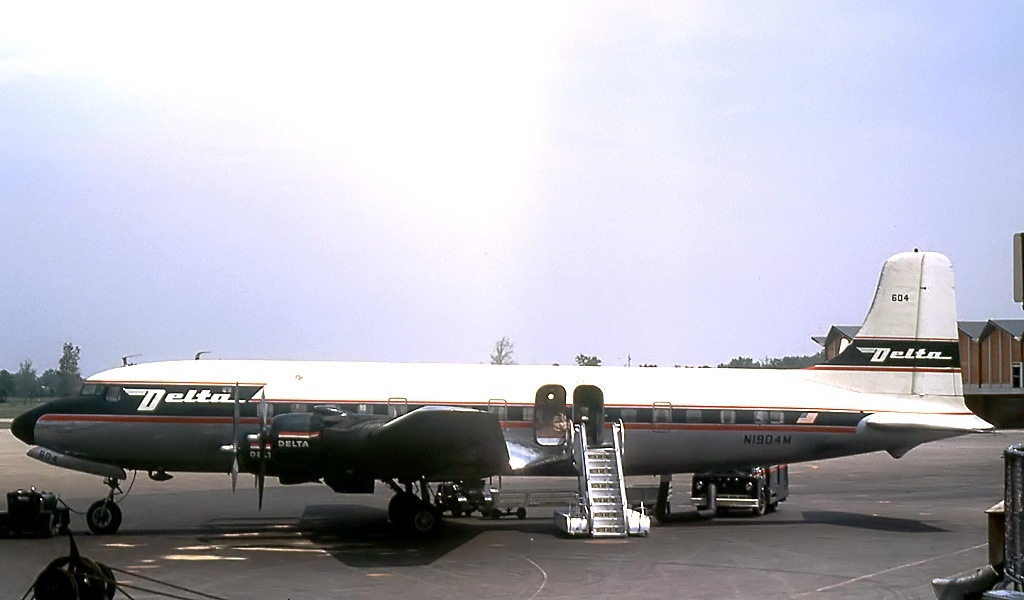
A Douglas DC-6 in a livery representative of that seen in the late 1950s.

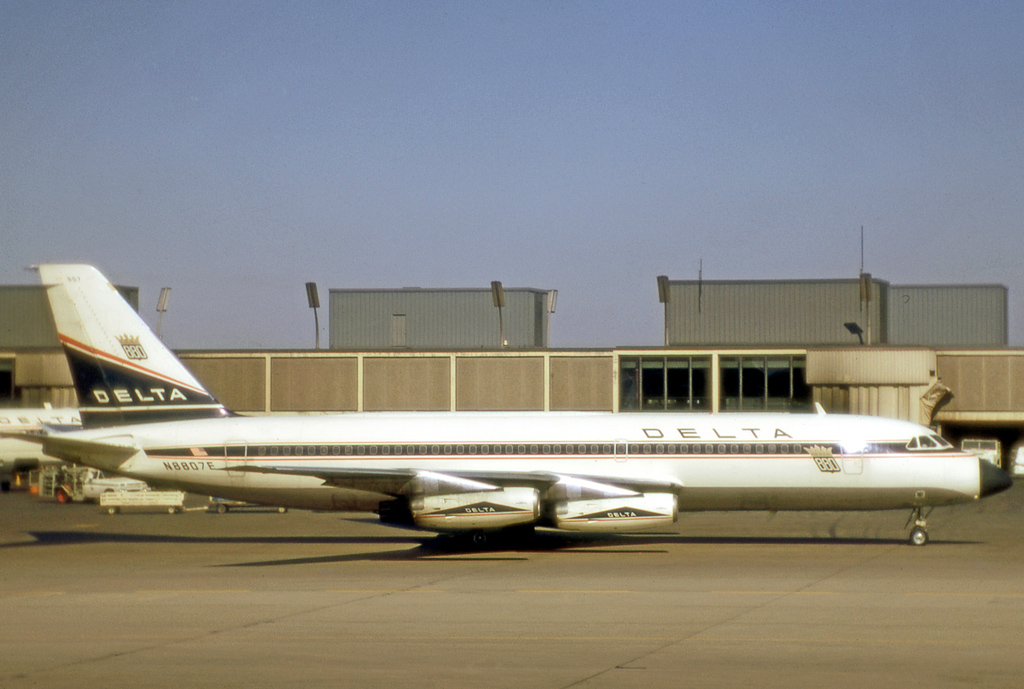
A Delta Convair 880 in a modified version of its original livery, 1971

This would change in 1962 with the introduction of the "Widget", a triangular logo intended to evoke the swept wings of a jet aircraft. Designed by Robert Bragg of advertising agency Burke Dowling Adams, the logo and livery were retained largely unchanged for the next 35 years. The livery consisted of a mostly white fuselage and bare metal underside with a blue cheatline over the windows, topped by a narrow red cheatline and rearward-angled "Delta Air Lines" titles (later shortened to simply "Delta"). The tail featured an angled version of the Widget logo with small "Delta" titles. The Douglas DC-9 initially featured a sideways-oriented tail logo, but was later repainted to match other fleet types. The Lockheed L-1011, introduced in 1972, added a black nose which was later rolled out fleet-wide in the late 1980s.

The livery underwent a major change in 1997, with the cheatline changed to curve down over the nose of the aircraft (with a similar red accent) and two-tone serif "Delta Air Lines" titles. The tail was painted entirely blue as well, with a curved red accent along the leading edge. The engine nacelles received the same design as the forward fuselage.

In 2000, the livery was again changed, this time to consist of an all-white fuselage with a three-tone tail design (in red, dark blue, and light blue) resembling waving fabric. Officially termed "Colors in Motion," it was frequently referred to as "Wavy Gravy." The Widget was also revised by Landor Associates to feature soft curves. In 2004, the original angled variant was reintroduced and applied to newly painted aircraft.

Upon Delta's return to financial stability in 2007, the airline introduced another new livery, consisting of an off-white fuselage, curved dark blue underside, and a dark blue tail featuring an angled, cropped rendition of the newly revised Widget. Designed by Lippincott the Widget was split vertically into dark and bright red sides, giving it a three-dimensional appearance. On aircraft with wing-mounted engines, the nacelles were painted dark blue. This has served as the airline's livery since that time, updated slightly in 2015 with the addition of the airline's logo in white on the underside of many aircraft.

Evolution of the Delta Air Lines logo

== Leadership ==
Current Chief Executive Officer Ed Bastian (since May 2 2016)

Current Chairman David Taylor (since 2019)

=== Previous CEOs ===
- C.E. Woolman (1925–1966)
- Charles H. Dolson (1970–1971)
- W.T. "Tom" Beebe (1971–1978)
- David C. Garrett Jr. (1978–1987)
- Ronald W. Allen (1987–1997)
- Leo F. Mullin (1997–2004)
- Gerald Grinstein (2004–2007)
- Richard H. Anderson (2007–2016)
