= SIAI S.16 =

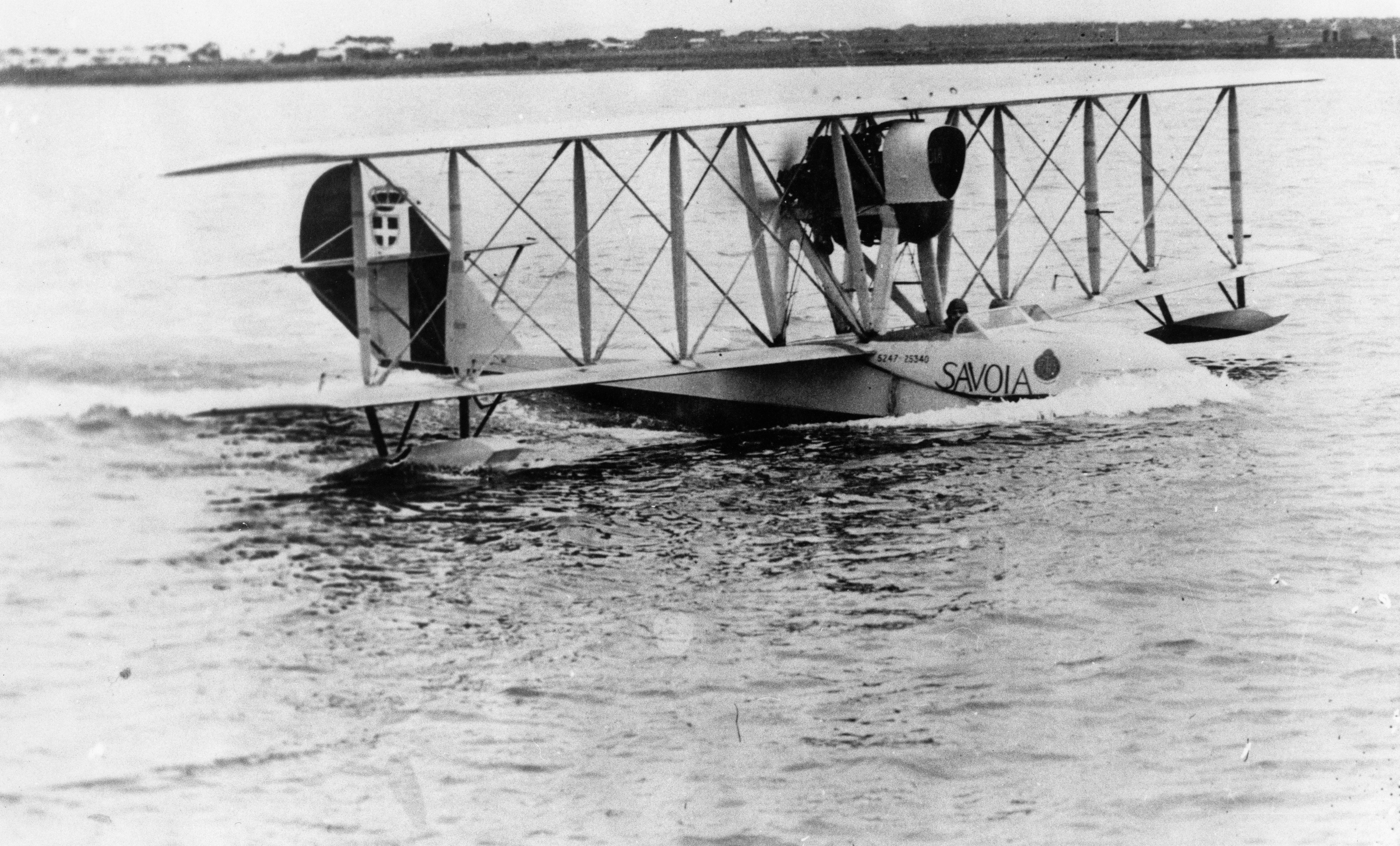
- Francesco de Pinedo's SIAI S.16ter Gennariello landing on the Brisbane River in Australia in 1925 during his Rome-Australia-Tokyo-Rome flight.

General information
- Type: Passenger and military flying-boat
- National origin: Italy
- Manufacturer: SIAI
- Designer: Rafaele Conflenti
- Primary user: Italian Navy

History
- First flight: 1919
- Developed into: Savoia-Marchetti S.59

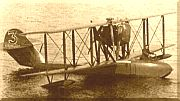
SIAI S.16

SIAI S.16bis

The SIAI S.16 was an Italian passenger flying boat, later serving as a military reconnaissance-bomber, claimed to be the most successful flying-boat of the 1920s.

== Design and development ==
The first flying boat designed by the Societa Idrovolanti Alta Italia (SIAI) for use as a civilian passenger carrier, the S.13, was a biplane flying boat with room for five passengers. The S.16 was powered by a single Fiat A.12bis engine. Military versions were also developed with a bow cockpit for an observer-gunner and bomb racks fitted underneath the wings. The military version was sold to Brazil, the Soviet Union, Spain, and Turkey.

== Operations ==
In 1925, the Italian aviator Francesco de Pinedo (1890–1933), a tenente colonnello (lieutenant colonel) in the Regia Aeronautica (Italian Royal Air Force) used an SIAI S.16ter he named Genariello for a record-setting flight from Rome to Australia and Tokyo in order to demonstrate his idea that seaplanes were superior to landplanes for long-distance flights. On 21 April, Pinedo and his mechanic, Ernesto Campanelli, departed Rome aboard Gennariello. They stopped first at Brindisi in Italy, then at Leros in Greece; Baghdad in Iraq; Bushehr and Chabar in Persia; Karachi, Bombay, Cocanada, and Calcutta in British India; Akyab, Rangoon, Tavoy, and Mergui in Burma; Phuket in Siam; Penang in British Malaya; Singapore; Batavia, Surabaya, Sumbawa, and Kupang in the Netherlands East Indies, and Broome, Carnarvon, Perth, Bunbury, Albany, Israelite Bay, and Adelaide in Australia before reaching Melbourne, where they arrived on 10 June and spent 36 days. On 16 July, Pinedo and Campanelli flew on to Sydney, where they spent another three weeks. Resuming their flight on 6 August, they visited Brisbane, Rockhampton, Townsville, Innisfail, Cooktown, and Thursday Island in Australia; Merauke, Dobo, Amboina, and Menado in the Netherlands East Indies; Cebu, Atimonan, Manila, and Aparri in the Philippines; Tamsui on Formosa; Shanghai in China; Mokpo in Korea; and Yamakawa and Kagoshima in Japan, before arriving in Tokyo on 26 September.

After a three-week stay in Tokyo, Pinedo and Campanelli began their return journey to Rome on 17 October, a 15,000-mile (24,000-km) trip that they made in only 22 days – an impressive speed at the time – with stops at Kagoshima in Japan; Shanghai in China; Hong Kong; Haiphong and Saigon in French Indochina; Bangkok in Siam; Rangoon in Burma; Calcutta, Benares, Delhi, and Karachi in British India; Bandar Abbas in Persia; Baghdad in Iraq; Alexandretta in Turkey; and Taranto in Italy before arriving in Rome on 7 November. The entire journey, made without special preparations for support at any of the stops and involving two long flights – of 600 miles (970 km) and 1,200 miles (1,900 km) – across the dry land of the Indian subcontinent in a non-amphibious flying boat, had proceeded without major incident and had required only one engine change, carried out at Tokyo. Pinedo and Campanelli had carried a jib sail and boat rudder to allow them to sail their flying boat through unfamiliar harbors in awkward winds, but they never used either the sail or the rudder during their expedition. The aviators had covered about 35,000 miles (56,000 km) in 370 hours of flight time in 80 stages over the course of 202 days, and a 1925 issue of the magazine Flight described their journey as "the most extensive aerial tour on record." The Fédération Aéronautique Internationale gave Pinedo its highest award, the FAI Gold Air Medal, for the flight, the first time it had awarded the medal. The Regia Aeronautica promoted Pinedo to colonnello (colonel) upon his return from the flight, and Italy's King Victor Emmanuel III made him a marchese (marquis).

== Variants ==
S.16
Production passenger carrier powered by a Fiat A.12bis inline 6-cylinder engine.
S.16bis
Improved civilian variant with reinforced hull, increased fuel capacity and a larger propeller.
S.16bis M
Military version of the S.16bis with bow cockpit, Soviet-operated versions (80 aircraft) were designated by them the S-16bis, some were licence-built in Spain.
S.16ter
Improved military variant first used by the Italian Navy from 1924, powered by a Lorraine-Dietrich 12Db V-12 piston engine.
S.23
Simplified variant for training, one built.

== Operators ==
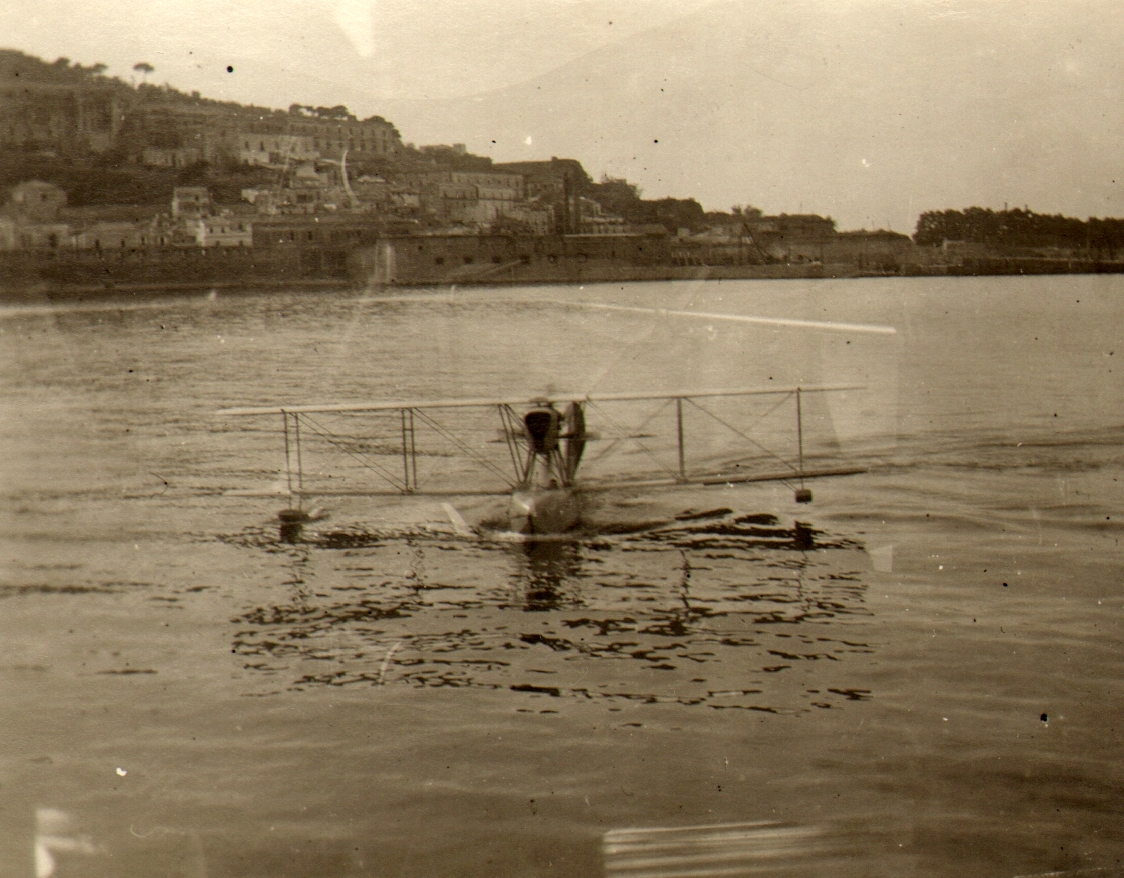

Brazil

- Brazilian Navy (15)

Spain

- Spanish Navy (26 including 10 built locally)

Kingdom of Italy

- Regia Marina (~103)

Latvia

- Latvian Navy (6)

Turkey

- Turkish Air Force (12)

Soviet Union

- Soviet Navy (80)

== Specifications (S.16ter) ==
Data from

General characteristics

- Crew: two or three (pilot, observer)
- Length: 9.89 m (32 ft 5.25 in)
- Wingspan: 15.50 m (50 ft 10.25 in)
- Height: 3.67 m (12 ft 0.5 in)
- Empty weight: 840 kg (1,852 lb)
- Gross weight: 2,652 kg (5,847 lb)
- Powerplant: 1 × Lorraine-Dietrich 12Db V-12 piston engine. , 298 kW (400 hp)

Performance

- Maximum speed: 194 km/h (120 mph, 100 kn)
- Range: 1,000 km (621 mi, 540 nmi)
- Service ceiling: 4,000 m (13,125 ft)

Armament

- 1 × 7.7mm (0.303in) machine-gun (ring mounting at bow cockpit)
- 230kg (485lb) of bombs on underwing racks

== See also ==
Related lists

- List of Interwar military aircraft
- List of flying boats and floatplanes
