= Savoia-Marchetti S.59 =

1920s Italian reconnaissance/bomber flying boat

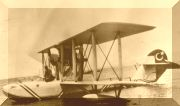

General information
- Type: Reconnaissance/bomber flying boat
- Manufacturer: Savoia-Marchetti
- Primary user: Regia Aeronautica
- Number built: 240+

History
- Introduction date: 1926
- First flight: 1925

The Savoia-Marchetti S.59 was a 1920s Italian reconnaissance/bomber flying boat designed and built by Savoia-Marchetti for the Regia Aeronautica (Italian Air Force).

== Development ==
Developed as an updated version of the Savoia S.16 for the Regia Aeronautica's maritime patrol squadrons. A biplane flying boat the S.59 had two side-by-side cockpits forward of the wings and a low cockpit fitted with a 7.7 mm (.303 in) Lewis Gun. The prototype was powered by a 268 kW (360 hp) Rolls-Royce Eagle engine and first flew in 1925. It was underpowered and 40 production aircraft were built with a 298 kW (400 hp) Lorraine-Dietrich 12Db V12 engine which did not cure the limited performance but the first aircraft was delivered in 1926.

To try to improve performance the next variant, the S.59bis had a more powerful 380 kW (510 hp) Isotta Fraschini Asso 500 engine. The company built 82 and CANT and Macchi also built 50 each which were all delivered in 1930. In 1928, the Regia Aeronautica flew a spectacular formation cruise of the western Mediterranean with 51 aircraft.

During service, some aircraft were modified with Handley Page leading edge slats on the upper wing. The type was withdrawn from front-line service in 1937 and relegated to training duties.

The aircraft was exported to Argentina (10 aircraft) and Romania (eight aircraft) and a civil variant was developed as the S.59P with an enclosed cabin for the two crew and four passengers.

One aircraft named Buenos Aires made a celebrated flight from New York to Buenos Aires in 1926.

A company called TAXI AEREI in Argentina used one S.59 bis in 1928 and it was later sold to the Paraguayan government for its Naval Aviation in 1929. This plane, serial R.1, saw action in the Chaco War and it was in active service until 1942.

== Variants ==
S.59 Prototype
One prototype with 268 kW (360 hp) Rolls-Royce Eagle V-12 engine
S.59
Production variant with 298 kW (400 hp) Lorraine-Dietrich 12Db V-12 engine, 40 built.
S.59bis
Re-engined variant with 380 kW (510 hp) Isotta Fraschini Asso 500 V-12 engine, 182 built.
S.59P
Civil variant with enclosed cabin for two crew and four passengers.

== Operators ==
Argentina

- Taxi Aerei

Kingdom of Italy

- Regia Aeronautica

Turkey

- Turkish Air Force

Paraguay

- Paraguayan Naval Aviation

Romania

- Royal Romanian Naval Aviation

== Specifications (S.59bis) ==
Data from The Illustrated Encyclopedia of Aircraft (Part Work 1982–1985). Orbis Publishing. p. 2893.

General characteristics

- Crew: 2
- Length: 10.36 m (11 ft 11.75 in)
- Wingspan: 15.50 m (50 ft 10.25 in)
- Height: 3.50 m (11 ft 5.75 in)
- Wing area: 60 m^{2} (645.86 sq ft)
- Empty weight: 1,950 kg (4,299 lb)
- Gross weight: 2,950 kg (6,504 lb)
- Powerplant: 1 × Isotta Fraschini Asso 500 Vee piston engine , 380 kW (510 hp)

Performance

- Maximum speed: 200 km/h (124 mph, 108 kn)
- Endurance: 5 hours 0 minutes
- Service ceiling: 4,550 m (14,930 ft)

Armament

- 1 × 7.7 mm (0.303 in) Lewis Gun
- 280 kg (617 lb) of bombs on external racks

== See also ==
Related lists

- List of Interwar military aircraft
- List of flying boats and floatplanes
