= Ronald W. Allen =

American businessman (born c. 1942)

- Education: Georgia Institute of Technology
- Occupation: Businessman

Ronald W. Allen (born c. 1942) is an American business executive. He served as president, chairman, and chief executive officer of Delta Air Lines from 1987 to 1997, and as chairman and chief executive officer of Aaron’s, Inc. from 2012 to 2014.

== Early life ==
Allen was born circa 1942. He graduated from the Georgia Institute of Technology in 1964.

== Career ==
Allen held leadership roles at Delta Air Lines, serving as president, chairman, and chief executive officer from 1987 to 1997. He later led Aaron’s, Inc. as chairman and chief executive officer between 2012 and 2014.

He has been a member of the board of directors for several companies, including The Coca-Cola Company since 1991, Aircastle since 2006, and Forward Air Corporation since 2014. He also previously served on the board of Forward Air Corporation from 2011 to 2013.

== Philanthropy ==
Allen formerly served on the board of trustees of Presbyterian College.

Allen is on the 2018-2019 board of trustees for Georgia Tech Foundation.
