= Chah Bar =

Chah Bar چاه بار
- Village
- Location within Iran
- Coordinates: 35°08′06″N 49°33′05″E
- Country: Iran
- Province: Markazi
- County: Saveh
- Bakhsh: Nowbaran
- Rural District: Bayat

Population (2006)
  - Total: 46
- Time zone: UTC+3:30 (IRST)
  - Summer (DST): UTC+4:30 (IRDT)

Chah Bar (Persian: چاه بار, also romanized as Chāh Bār; also known as Chāh Bahār) is a village in Bayat Rural District, Nowbaran District, Saveh County, Markazi Province, Iran. At the 2006 census, its population was 46, in 13 families.
