= Chabar =

Village in Markazi province, Iran

Chabar Persian: چابار
- Village
- Location within Iran
- Coordinates: 34°34′41″N 49°25′32″E
- Country: Iran
- Province: Markazi
- County: Komijan
- District: Central
- Rural District: Esfandan

Population (2016)
  - Total: 128
- Time zone: UTC+3:30 (IRST)

Chabar (Persian: چابار) (Note: Also romanized as Chābār; also known as Chāh Bahār and Chāhwār) is a village in Esfandan Rural District of the Central District in Komijan County, Markazi province, Iran.

== Demographics ==
=== Population ===
At the time of the 2006 National Census, the village's population was 141 in 44 households. The following census in 2011 counted 139 people in 46 households. The 2016 census measured the population of the village as 128 people in 39 households.
