= Margherita of Savoy =

Queen of Italy from 1878 to 1900

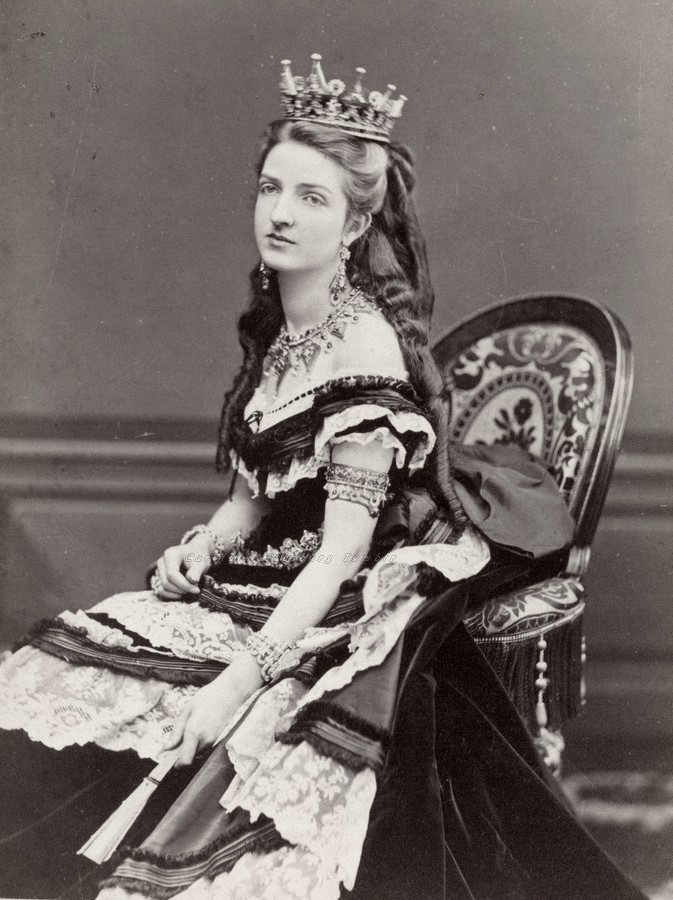
- Margherita in the 1870s

Queen consort of Italy
- Tenure: 9 January 1878 – 29 July 1900
- Born: 20 November 1851; Palazzo Chiablese, Turin, Kingdom of Sardinia
- Died: 4 January 1926 (aged 74); Bordighera, Italy
- Burial: Pantheon, Rome
- Spouse: Umberto I of Italy (m. 1868; died 1900)
- Issue: Victor Emmanuel III of Italy
Names
- Margherita Maria Teresa Giovanna di Savoia
- House: Savoy-Genoa
- Father: Prince Ferdinando of Savoy, Duke of Genoa
- Mother: Princess Elisabeth of Saxony

- Coat of arms of Margherita of Savoy, Queen of Italy

Margherita of Savoy (Margherita Maria Teresa Giovanna; 20 November 1851 – 4 January 1926) was Queen of Italy by marriage to her first cousin King Umberto I of Italy. She was the daughter of Prince Ferdinando of Savoy, Duke of Genoa, and Princess Elisabeth of Saxony, and the mother of King Victor Emmanuel III of Italy.

== Life ==
=== Early life ===
Baptism of Margherita of Savoy

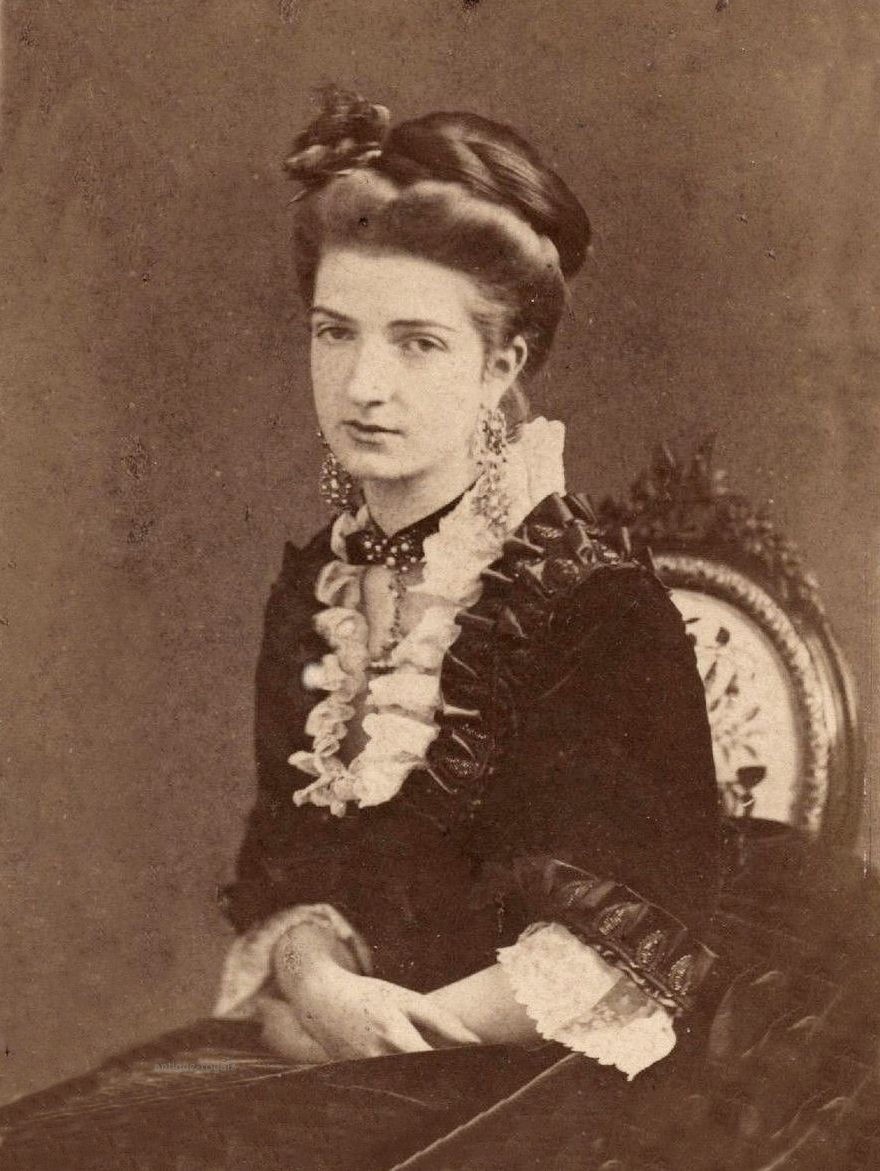
Queen Margherita in her youth

Margherita was born on 20 November 1851 in Turin (at the time capital of the Kingdom of Sardinia-Piedmont) to Prince Ferdinando of Savoy, Duke of Genoa, and Princess Elisabeth of Saxony. Her father died in 1855, and her mother remarried morganatically to Major Nicholas Bernoud, Marchese di Rapallo. She was educated by Countess Clelia Monticelli di Casalrosso and her Austrian governess Rosa Arbesser. Reportedly, she was given a more advanced education than most princesses at the time, and displayed a great deal of intellectual curiosity. As a person, she was described as sensitive, proud and with a strong force of will without being hard, as well as having the ability to be charming when she chose to. As to her appearance, she was described as a tall, stately blonde, but she was not regarded as a beauty. Initially, she was suggested to marry Prince Charles of Romania. In 1867, the royal council president Luigi Federico Menabrea pressed the king to arrange a marriage between Margherita and her cousin, the heir to the Italian throne.

=== Crown princess (1868–1878) ===
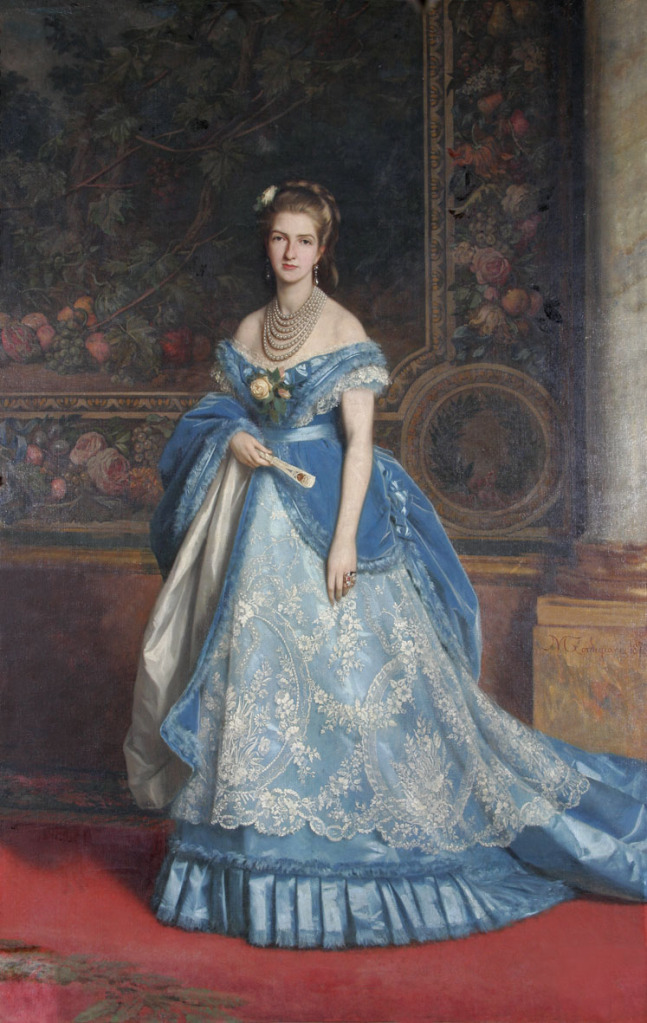
Queen Margherita in 1872

Margherita signed the wedding contract with her first cousin, Umberto, Prince of Piedmont, on 21 April 1868 in the ballroom of the royal palace in Turin, followed the next day by one civilian and one religious wedding ceremony. After the wedding, the crown prince couple settled in Naples. On 11 November 1869, Margherita gave birth to Victor Emmanuel, Prince of Naples, later Victor Emmanuel III of Italy, in Capodimonte in Naples. The relationship between Margherita and Umberto was not a success sexually; before their wedding, Umberto was already involved in an affair with his long-term lover, Eugenia Attendolo Bolognini , duchess Litta, and two years after their wedding, the royal couple reportedly discontinued their sexual relations. Their son therefore remained their only child; however, they never made their personal separation known to the public, and their relationship was in other aspects quite amiable: Margherita and Umberto worked together harmoniously as colleagues, Umberto even relying on her politically.

Margherita was raised with the idea of paternalistic monarchy and the ideal of enlightened despotism. Because of the lack of a queen, Margherita became the first lady of Italy immediately following her marriage, and she was given many representational duties intended to make the new royal house of united Italy popular throughout the peninsula. She became a great asset in this role, with an ability to say and do the right things to effectively arouse public enthusiasm and feeling in her public appearances. During her representational tours through Italy, made to arouse popularity for the royal house and thereby the united nation of Italy, she was careful to wear local folk costumes and demonstrate enthusiasm for local customs, traditions and culture, a method which made her so popular that she eclipsed the popularity of her husband.

In January 1871, after the final unification of Italy and the proclamation of Rome as the capital of Italy, the crown prince and crown princess settled in Rome. There, Margherita successfully continued her task by making her receptions at the royal court the center of Roman high society in her effort to subdue the opposition toward unification within the Roman aristocracy. She eventually succeeded in making her salon one of the most exclusive and famous in contemporary Europe.

=== Queen (1878–1900) ===
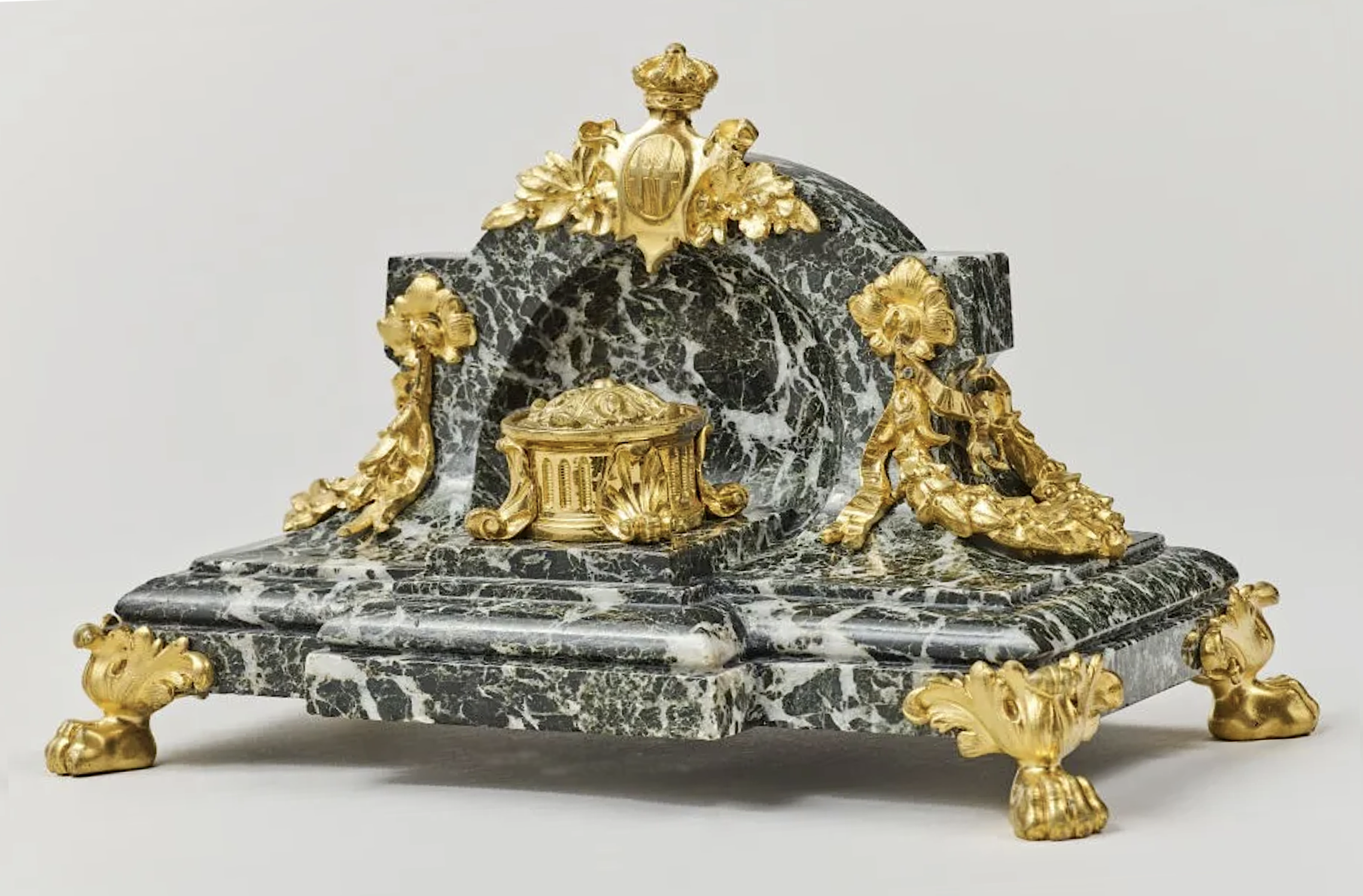
Inkstand of Queen Margherita with her double coat of arms

Margherita became Queen of Italy upon the succession of Umberto to the throne on 9 January 1878. In the critical situation that year, with the king and the pope, as well as an assassination attempt against the new king, Umberto reportedly asked Margherita for political advice. The attempted assassination of the king by Giovanni Passannante in November 1878 reportedly made her work even more forcefully to strengthen the prestige of the crown and build loyalty to the institution by gathering followers and making connections. As when she was a crown princess, she was actively assisted in this networking and image building by her favorite courtiers, marchioness Paola Pes di Villamarina and marquis Emanuele Pes di Villamarina, who were appointed her dama d’onore (senior lady in waiting) and cavaliere d’onore (senior lord in waiting), respectively.

As queen, Margherita worked to protect the monarchy against republicans and socialists, and she gathered a circle of conservative intellectuals and artists known as the Circolo della regina (Circle of the Queen) in her famous literary salon known as giovedì della regina (Queen's Thursdays), where she benefited artists and writers. Among her circle of artists were the notoriously democratic and republican poet Giosuè Carducci, who famously wrote an ode to her when she became queen, and Marco Minghetti, who functioned somewhat as her guide in cultural circles, as well as her confidant. She founded cultural institutions, notably the Società del Quartetto (Quartet Society) and the Casa di Dante (House of Dante). Queen Margherita also fostered loyalty toward the monarchy by social and charitable work. She frequently visited and acted as the benefactor of hospitals, schools and institutions for children and the blind, founding the first library for the blind in Florence (1892). Her work was effective and already during the 1880s, she had become the centre of a personal cult as a popular symbol of the Italian monarchy and celebrated by poets and authors, as well as by the press, as a symbol of moral reform.

King Umberto by contrast had love affairs with the contessa fatale (Vincenza Publicola-Santacroce, contessa di Santa Fiora), besides duchess Litta, whom he reportedly also asked for political advice, which exposed the court to scandal; however, the queen was close to her son and strengthened her relations to him even further after his wedding. Queen Margherita was also involved in state affairs: viewing democracy as a potential threat to the monarchy, she supported Francesco Crispi against parliament. As a nationalist, she did not hesitate to support the First Italo-Ethiopian War in 1896, in contrast to Umberto, who was hesitant. As a central figure of the conservative forces, she supported the repressive actions toward the rioters in Milan in 1898, which lead to the Bava Beccaris massacre.

On 18 August 1893, in the company of various guides, porters, Alpini, politicians and aristocrats, Margherita climbed the Punta Gnifetti (or Signalkuppe), a peak of the Monte Rosa massif on the Swiss–Italian border, for the inauguration of the mountain hut named after her. At 4,554 metres, the "Capanna Regina Margherita" (Margherita Hut) remains the highest hut in Europe. Margherita later accepted the position of Honorary President of the Ladies' Alpine Club.

=== Queen mother (1900–1926) ===
Umberto I, who had already survived in the past two attempted murders by the anarchists Giovanni Passannante and Pietro Acciarito, was killed on 29 July 1900 by another anarchist, Gaetano Bresci. As the widow of a murdered monarch, Margherita found an enormous amount of sympathy, which created a veritable myth around her as the mourning widow. She was aware of this mythology and acted accordingly in this part to benefit the prestige of the monarchy.

As queen dowager, Margherita took a step back and allowed her daughter-in-law to take precedence, as this was a part of the monarchical system which was her ideal; however, this did not mean that she retired from public life, and she remained a dominant public figure, performing what she regarded as her dynastic duties by making official visits to hospitals and churches until her death. She disliked the tolerance of democracy displayed by her son, the king, which she viewed as a form of socialist monarchy, and worked to ensure the monarchic traditions as much as she could against democratic tendencies. Her son did not wish to allow her any influence in state affairs, but she remained involved in politics through her connections and remained a political figure. In contrast to most nationalists, Margherita opposed World War I. During the war, she made one of her residences into a hospital and engaged actively within the Red Cross.

After the end of World War I, Margherita feared a socialist revolution and the end of the monarchy. This, combined with her nationalism and social conservatism, led her to support Italian fascism under Benito Mussolini, for which she felt a personal regard, although she never explicitly expressed her support. In October 1922, the quadrumvirs (Emilio De Bono, Italo Balbo, Michele Bianchi, and Cesare Maria De Vecchi) visited her at Bordighera to pay their respects prior to the March on Rome. Dowager Queen Margherita died in her villa in Bordighera on the Italian Riviera on 4 January 1926, aged 74, after having a long attack of pleurisy. On 10 January 1926, her body was taken to Rome, where she was buried the following day in the royal tombs of the Pantheon, where she still lies. The funeral convoy stopped briefly at each station to allow people to say a final farewell. Her body passed through Pisa at night, and the band of railway workers of the city went to play as a sign of respect. An emotional crowd hindered and slowed down the progress of the train with her body in order to be able to approach and throw flowers.

== Legacy ==
In 1879, the town of Margherita di Savoia, in Apulia, near Barletta, was named after her. In 1881, the mining town of Margherita in Assam, India, was named after her. Also in 1881, a large glass window was made of her by Studio Moretti Caselli in Perugia, which was then shown around Italy and Europe before returning. The Pizza Margherita, whose red tomatoes, green basil, and white mozzarella cheese represent the Italian flag, was named after her in 1889. A pre-dreadnought battleship was named in her honour. It was laid down in 1898 and launched in 1901. In 1906, Margherita's nephew, Luigi Amedeo, Duke of the Abruzzi, made the first ascent of the highest summit of Mount Stanley (the third-highest mountain in Africa) and named it Margherita Peak in her honour. In 2011, some of the queen's jewellery was auctioned at Christie's.

== Gallery ==
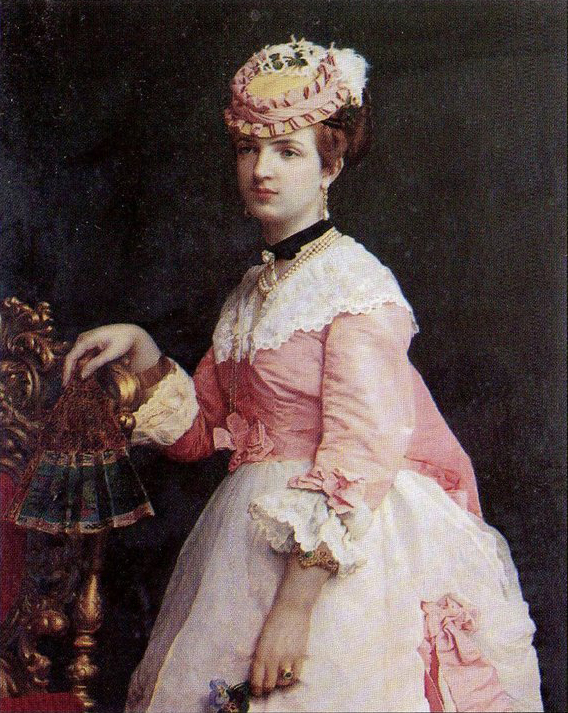
Margherita of Savoy (1868)

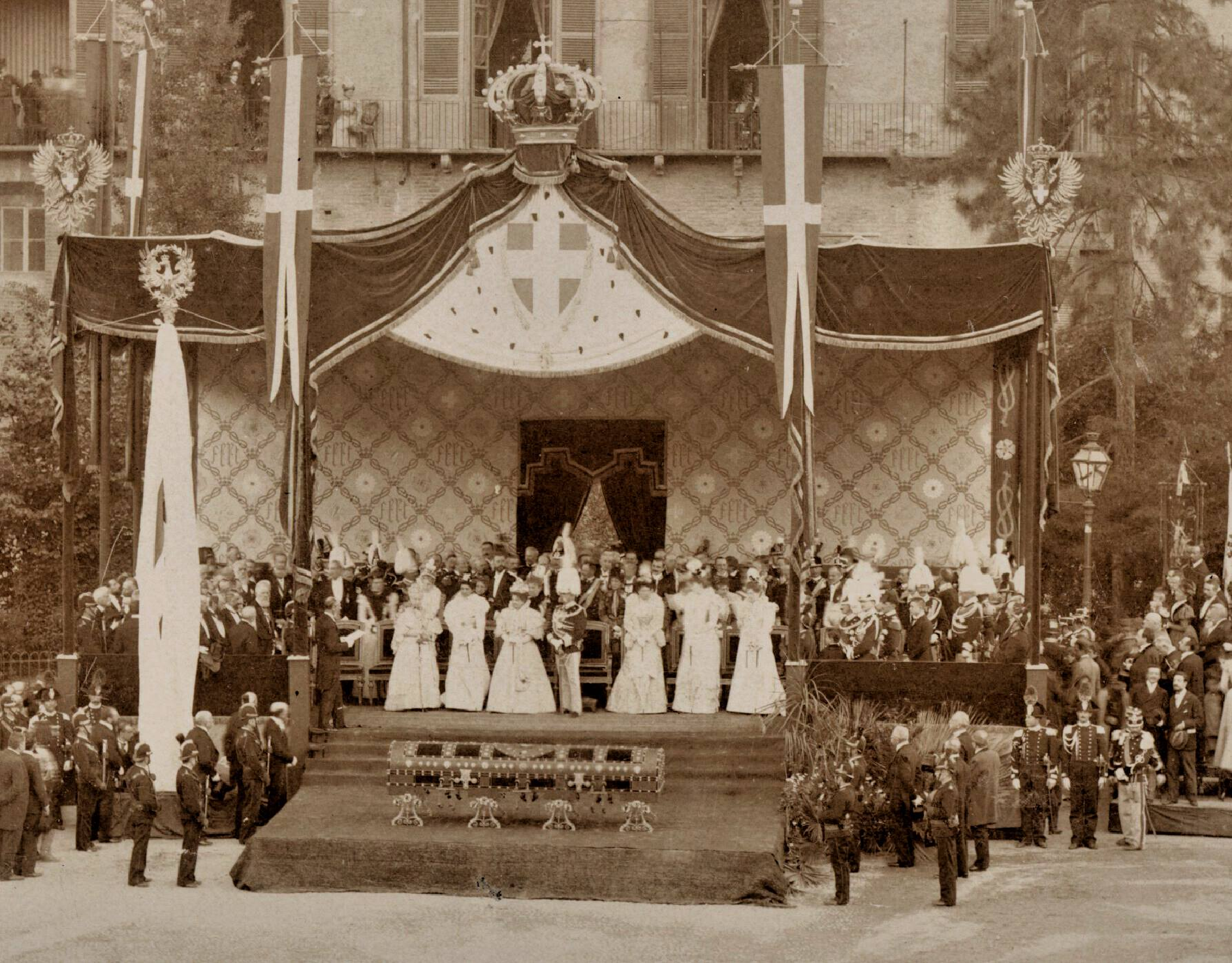
Royal ceremony in Palazzo Madama, Rome (1898)

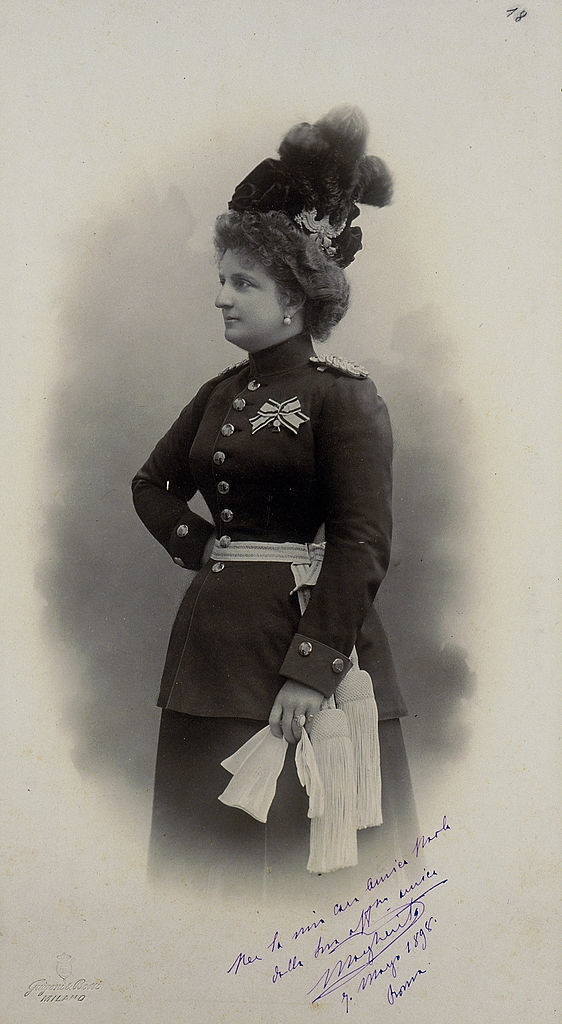
The Queen Margherita in military uniform (1898)

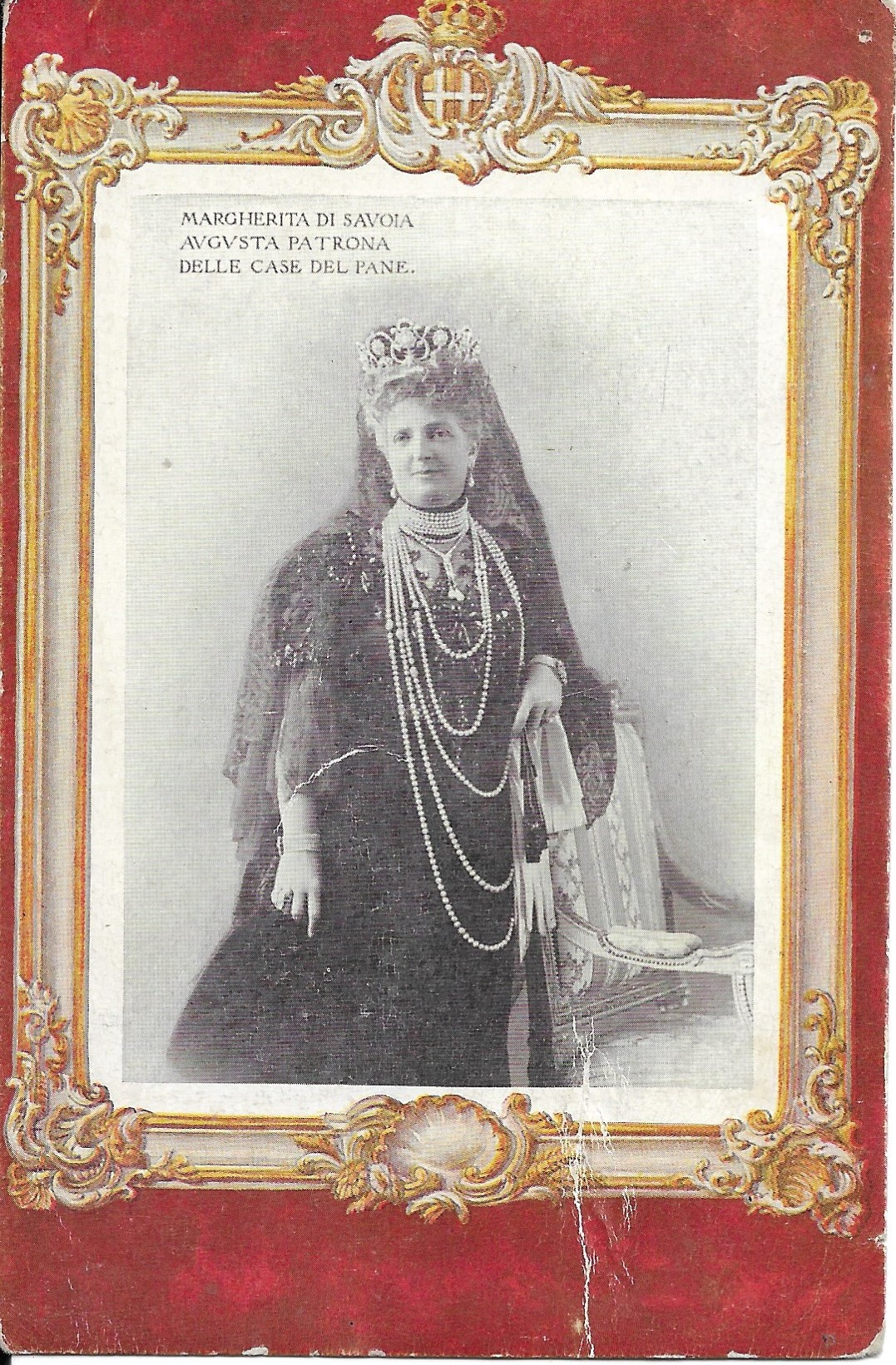
Regina Margherita di Savoia

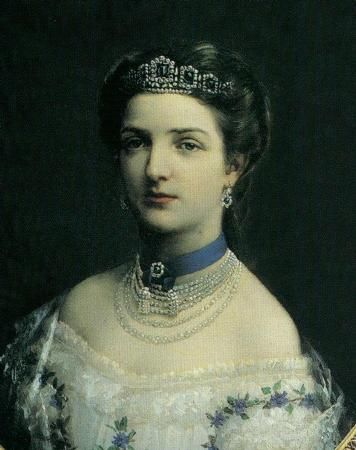
Margherita of Savoy, Queen of Italy (1870)

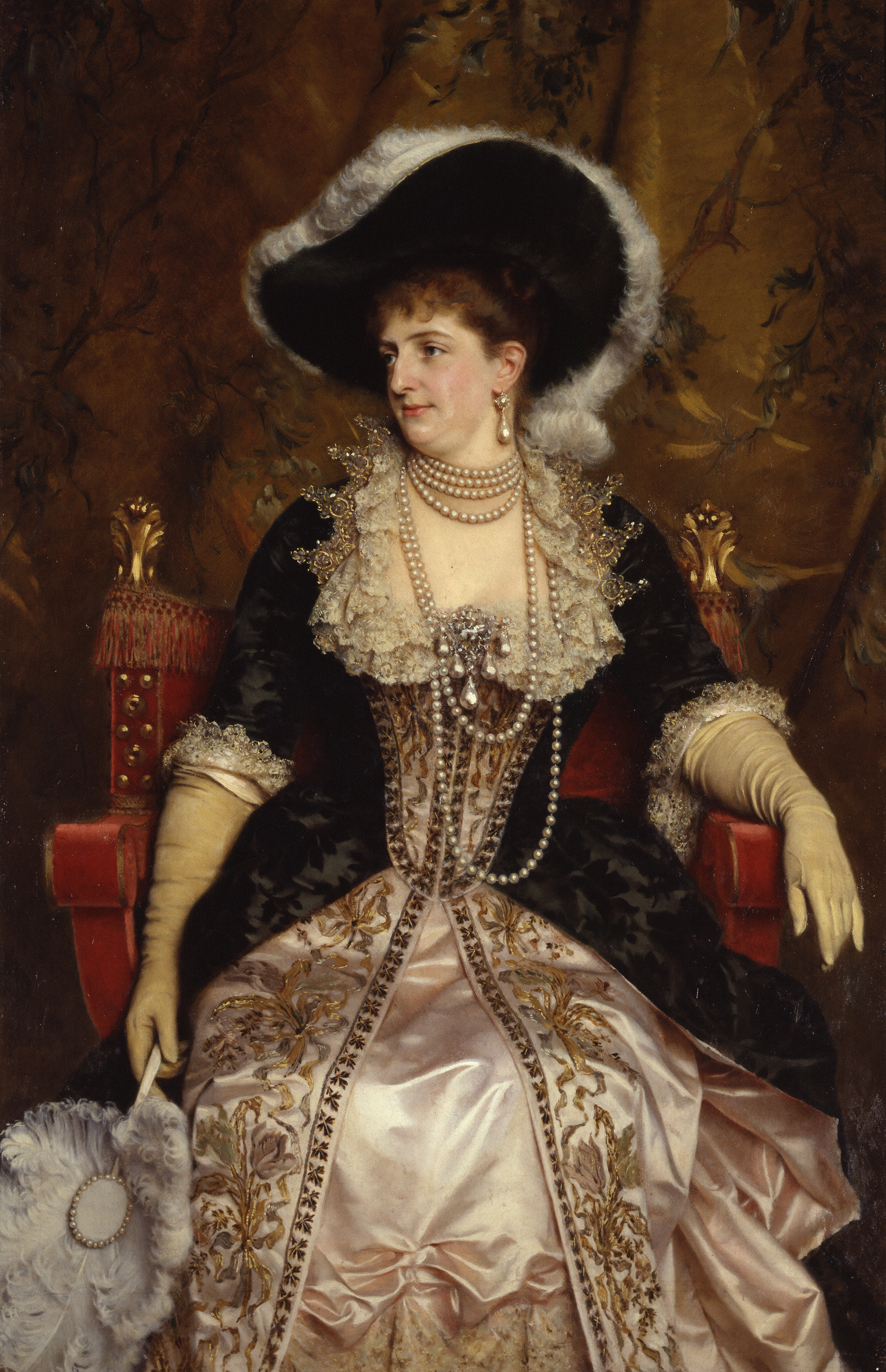
Portrait of Queen Margherita by Michele Gordigiani (1884)

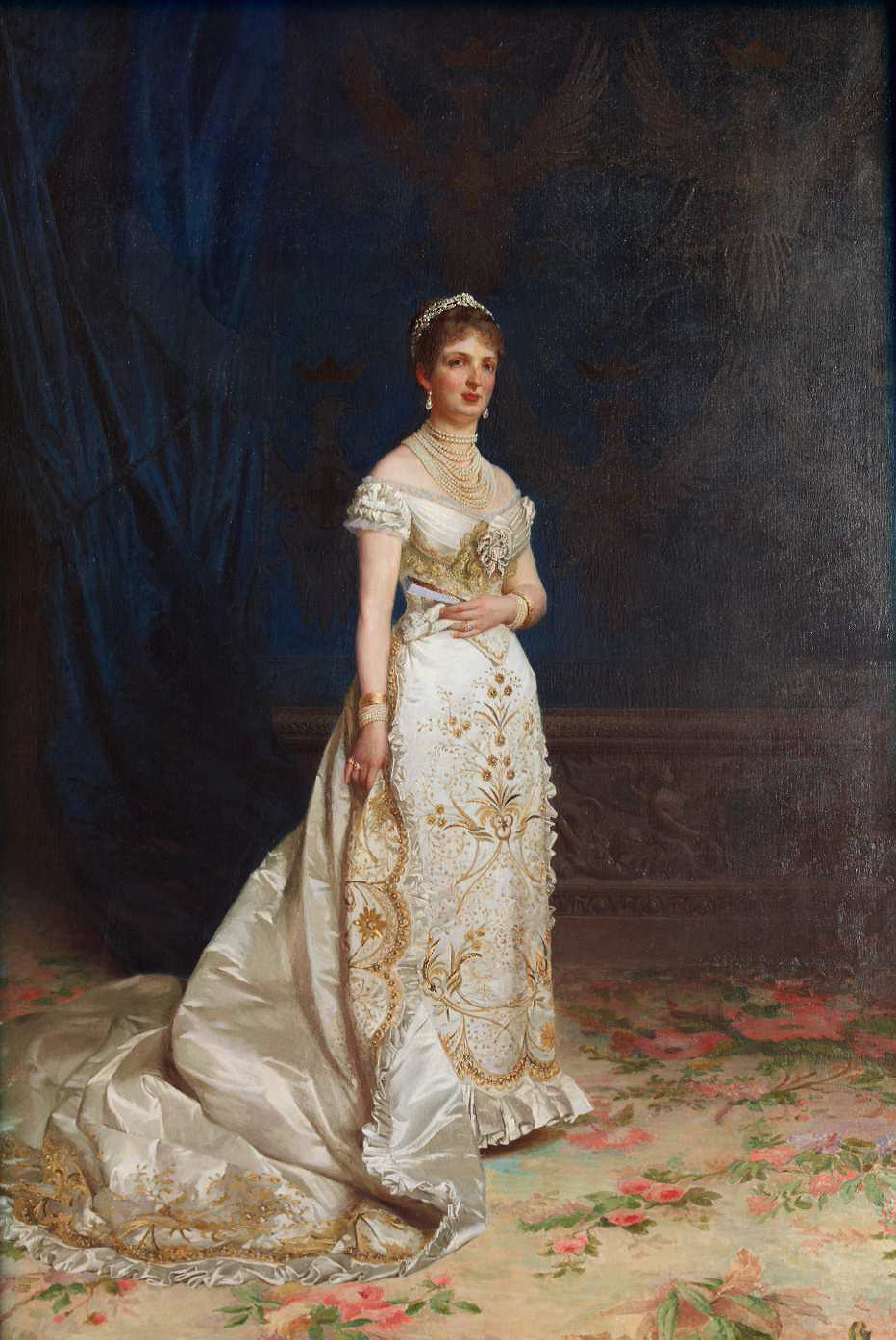
Portrait of Queen Margherita by Pasquale Di Criscito (1878)

== Notes ==
Margherita of Savoy House of Savoy Born: 20 November 1851 Died: 4 January 1926
Italian royalty
Vacant Title last held by Marie Louise of Austria	Queen consort of Italy; 9 January 1878 – 29 July 1900	Succeeded by Elena of Montenegro
