= Commemorative Medal of the March on Rome =

Italian medal

- Medaglia commemorativa della Marcia su Roma
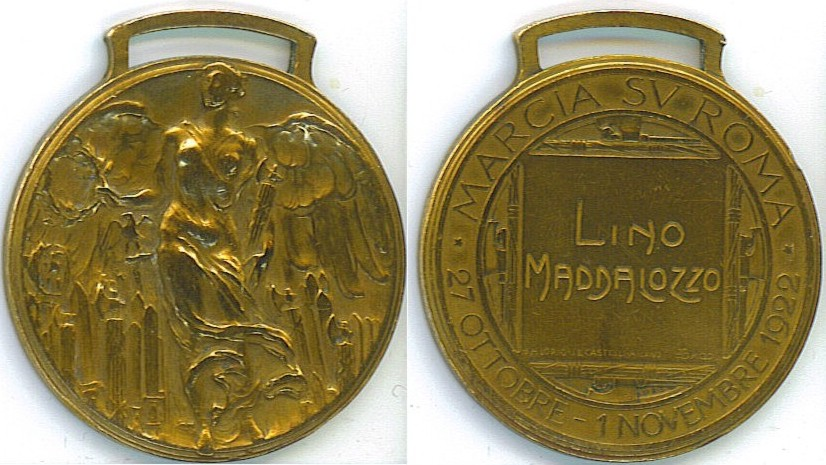
- The obverse (left) and reverse of the medal.
- Type: Commemorative medal
- Awarded for: Participation in the March on Rome
- Presented by: Kingdom of Italy
- Eligibility: "Blackshirt" and military personnel
- Status: obsolete
- Established: 31 December 1923
- Ribbon of the medal

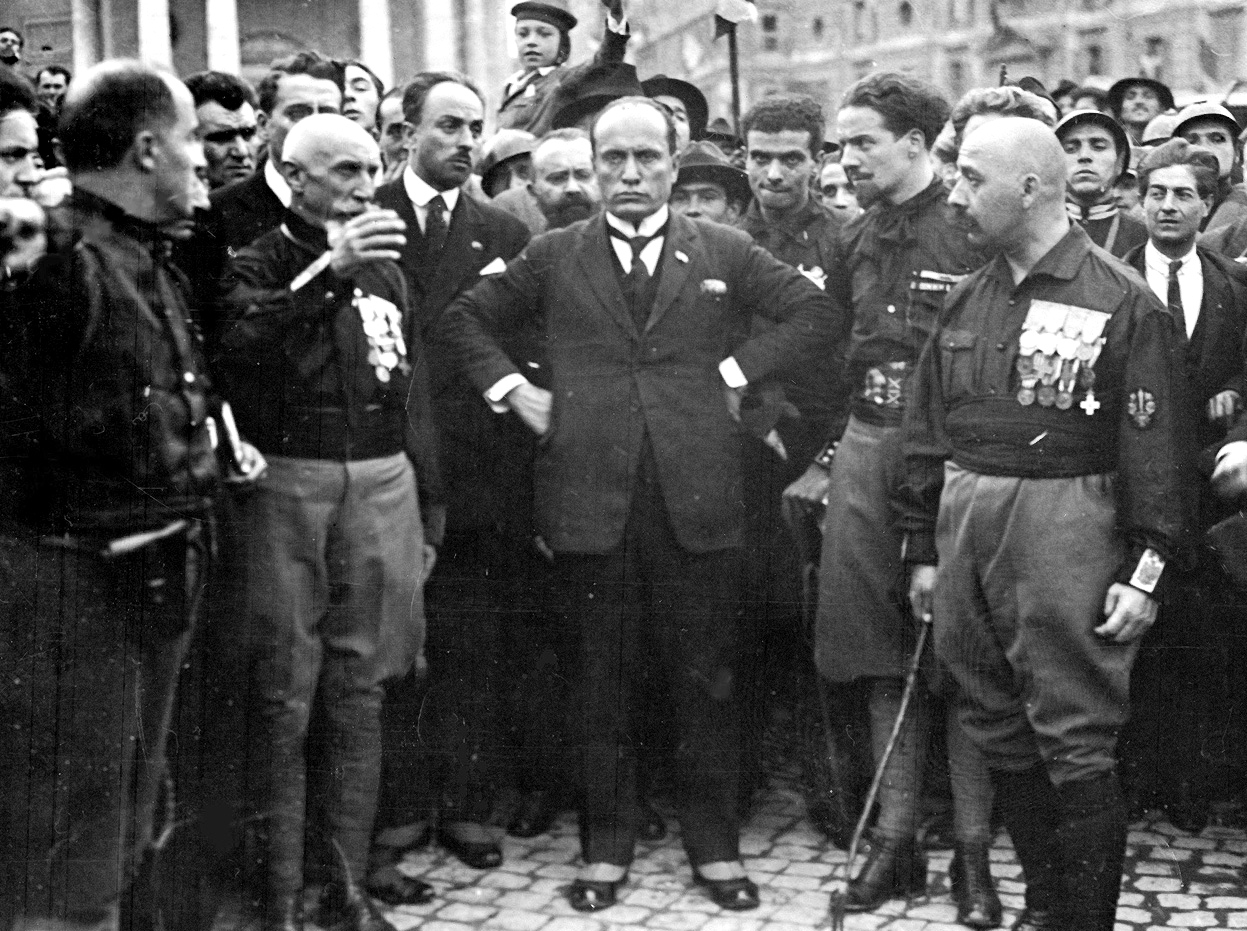
Gold medal recipients Emilio De Bono, Benito Mussolini, Italo Balbo, and Cesare Maria De Vecchi.

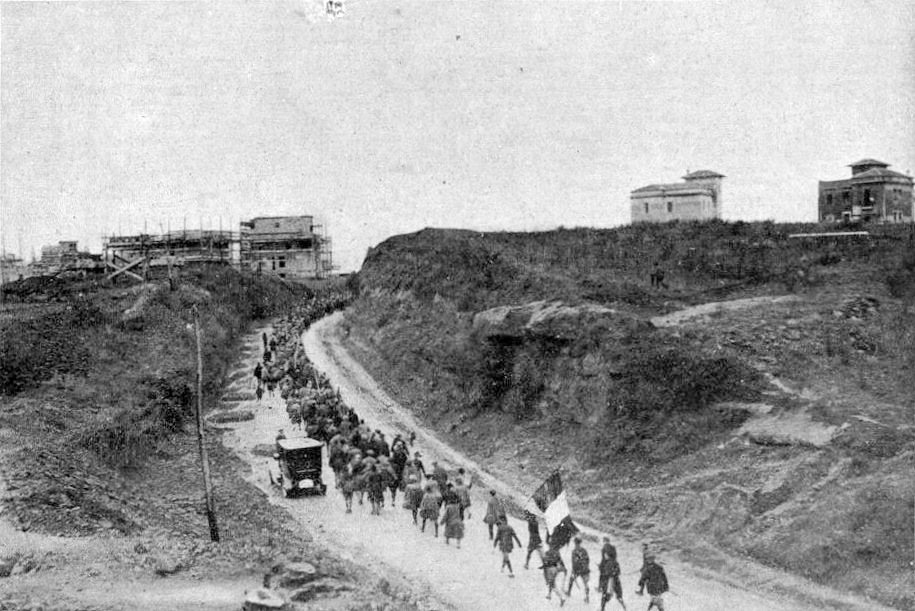
Italian fascists moving toward Rome on 28 October 1922.

The Commemorative Medal of the March on Rome (Italian: Medaglia commemorativa della Marcia su Roma) was a decoration granted by the Kingdom of Italy to recognize the October 1922 March on Rome. The march pressured the Italian government into appointing Benito Mussolini as Prime minister of Italy and began Fascist rule and what the National Fascist Party deemed the "Era Fascista" ("Fascist Era").

== Background ==
In October 1922, Benito Mussolini decided on a "March on Rome" by members of the Italian National Fascist Party (Italian: Partito Nazionale Fascista or PNF) to pressure King Victor Emmanuel III (Italian: Vittorio Emanuele III) into forcing Prime Minister Luigi Facta to resign and appointing Mussolini to replace him. On 25 October 1922, he appointed the "Quadrumvirs" – the Italian fascist leaders Michele Bianchi, Emilio De Bono, Cesare Maria De Vecchi, and Italo Balbo – to organize the march while he remained in the PNF's stronghold in Milan. By 27 October 1922, about 30,000 supporters of the PNF had converged on Rome in 19 columns, and they entered the city on 28 October and began the first of three days of PNF marches and demonstrations. Facta drafted an order declaring martial law and a state of siege in Rome, but Victor Emmanuel, fearing bloodshed, refused to sign it. Facta resigned on 29 October, and on 30 October Victor Emmanuel summoned Mussolini to Rome. On 31 October 1922, the king appointed Mussolini as the next prime minister, an event which began Fascist rule in Italy and which Italian fascists regarded as the beginning of the "Era Fascista" ("Fascist Era").

== History ==
The Commemorative Medal of the March on Rome was created on 31 December 1923 by an order of the Voluntary Militia for National Security (Italian: Milizia Volontaria per la Sicurezza Nazionale or MVSN), commonly called the "Blackshirts." With royal decrees of 31 January 1926, 1 November 1928, and 15 July 1938 the Kingdom of Italy greatly expanded eligibility for the medal.

== Eligibility ==
The medal was issued in three grades, gold, silver, and bronze. The 31 December 1923 MVSN order authorized the medal by grade as follows:

- The gold medal for Benito Mussolini, the Quadrumvirs, and the administrative secretary of the National Fascist Party, Giovanni Marinelli.
- The silver medal for the 19 commanders of the columns organized to converge on Rome in the march.
- The bronze medal for all other members of the National Fascist Party who participated in the march between 27 October and 1 November 1922.

By order of the National Fascist Party on 7 December 1931, the silver medal awarded to Achille Starace, a column leader during the march, was changed to a gold medal on the occasion of his appointment as secretary of the party.

After the initial creation of the medal in 1923, the Kingdom of Italy expanded eligibility for it as follows:

- The royal decree of 31 January 1926 extended eligibility to all members of the Voluntary Militia for National Security (Italian: Milizia Volontaria per la Sicurezza Nazionale, or MVSN), commonly called the "Blackshirts."
- The royal decree of 1 November 1928 extended eligibility to personnel who were members of the Italian Armed Forces on 28 October 1922 but did not engage in opposition to the march that day.
- The royal decree of 15 July 1938 made all members of the Italian Armed Forces eligible.

== Appearance ==
=== Medal ===
The medal is a gold, silver, or bronze disc with a diameter of 34 millimetres (1.3 in) and an hook attachment. The obverse depicts a winged victory holding an oak crown in his right hand and supporting a fasces in his left hand. Behind him are legionary insignia, fasces, and Roman daggers. The reverse is centered around a blank quadrilateral delimited by four fasces, within which a recipient could have his name engraved. The identity of the manufacturer of the medal – Lorioli & Castelli of Milan, Italy – is incused below the quadrilateral with the phrase "M Lorioli & Castelli Milano et EB Mod. Rip. Ris". The reverse is inscribed along its edge with the phrase "MARCIA SV ROMA" ("MARCH ON ROME") around the upper half and the phrase "27 OTTOBRE–1 NOVEMBRE 1922" ("27 OCTOBER–1 NOVEMBER 1922") around the lower half, with two small stars, one each on the left and right edges, separating the phrases.

=== Ribbon ===
The ribbon is divided equally into two vertical bands representing the colors of the comune ("commune" or "municipality") of Rome, with yellow on the left and amaranth on the right.
