= Big Wing =

Air fighting tactic

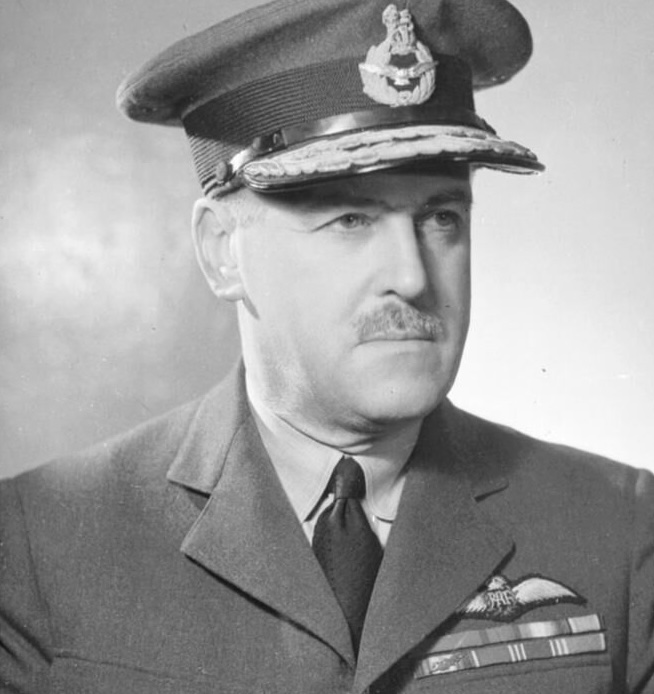
Air Chief Marshal Trafford Leigh-Mallory was a key advocate of the Big Wing

The Big Wing, also known as a Balbo, was an air fighting tactic proposed during the Battle of Britain by 12 Group commander Air Vice-Marshal Trafford Leigh-Mallory and Acting Squadron Leader Douglas Bader. In essence, the tactic involved meeting incoming Luftwaffe bombing raids in strength with a wing-shaped formation of three to five squadrons. In the Battle, this tactic was employed by the Duxford Wing, under Bader's command.

The name "Balbo" refers to Italo Balbo, an Italian air force officer and fascist political leader famous for leading large formations of aircraft on long-distance flights before the war.

== See also ==
- British military history of World War II
