= Joraku =

Japanese metonymic expression

In Japanese, Joraku (Japanese: 上洛) is a metonymic expression referring to a "March on Kyoto," and indicating that one intends to seize political power. It is similar in concept to the March on Rome in European discourse.

In Japan, the ancient capital city of Kyoto was modeled after the Chinese capital Rakuyo (Chinese: 洛陽, Pinyin: Luoyang. Literati and scholars would refer to Kyoto as Rakuyo. The term joraku is composed of one kanji character meaning "up" or "ascend" and the second kanji is borrowed from the name Rakuyo. The term joraku thus alludes to the idea of gaining control of the national political situation (or ascending in power or station) by entering the capital city.

== See also ==
- March on Rome
