= Eugenia Attendolo Bolognini =

Italian noblewoman

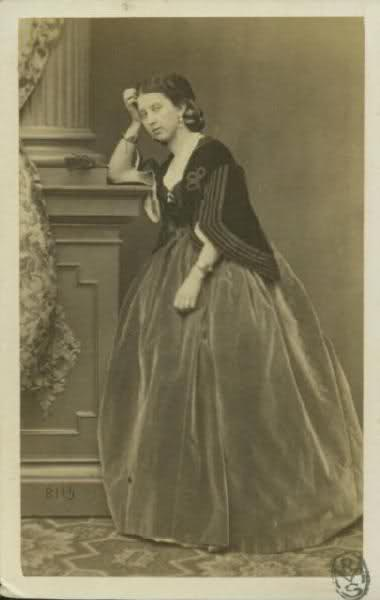
Photo of Eugenia Attendolo Bolognini

Eugenia Attendolo Bolognini (12 February 1837– 6 April 1914), styled by marriage as duchessa Litta Visconti Arese, was an Italian noblewoman, philanthropist and hostess of a famous literary salon in Milan.

She was, for a time, a lady-in-waiting to the Queen of Italy, Margherita of Savoy. She is most known for her love affair with King Umberto I of Italy, which lasted from the time of his marriage in 1868 until he died in 1900.

== Family ==
Attendolo Bolognini was the daughter of Conte Giovanni Giacomo Bolognini Attendolo (1797–1865) and Contessa Eugenia Vimercati (1810–1885, later Princess of Porcia by her second marriage to Prince Alfonso Serafino of Porcia).

She married Giulio Litta Visconti Arese in 1855 and had 2 children, Pompeo (1856–1921) and Alfonso (1870–1891). She is also most known for her love affair with King Umberto I of Italy, which lasted from his marriage until his death. It is possible she was the mother of Umberto's 3 illegitimate children, but this has yet to be confirmed.
