= Balbo (aircraft formation) =

Balbo was a common term in the late 1930s and early 1940s to describe any large formation of aircraft. It was named after the Italian fascist flying ace Italo Balbo who led a series of large aircraft formations in record-breaking flights to promote Italian aviation in the 1930s. During the Battle of Britain the term was used for the Big Wings that were based at RAF Duxford. The term is used today in the UK for a mass fly-by at the end of an airshow.
