= Paola Pes di Villamarina =

Paola Pes di Villamarina (17 April 1838 – 23 August 1914) was an Italian courtier, head of the court of the queen of Italy, Margherita of Savoy, and an influential favorite.

== Life ==
She was born on 17 April 1838 in Turin to Count Edoardo Rignon and Maria Cristina Pilo-Boyl. She married Marquis Emanuele Pes di Villamarina (1834–1891). She was appointed dama d'Onore (Principal lady in waiting) and her spouse appointed Cavaliere d'Onore (Principal gentleman-in-waiting) to crown princess Margherita upon her marriage to the crown prince in 1868. As dame di onora, she was the head of Margherita's court and responsible for all the other ladies-in-waiting, the dama di corte.

She soon became a personal friend, confidante and favorite of Margherita. Reportedly, she shared the principles and values around charity and politics. She and her spouse was Margherita's supporters in her extensive and successful representational project which was created to benefit the unification of Italy by making the Italian royal house popular as a national symbol through Margherita as crown princess and queen. Paola Pes di Villamarina was well known public figure, always to be seen by the side of Margherita during her official visits to schools, hospitals, travels and public events. Pes di Villamarina became known for handling the massive charitable work of the queen, by acting as a channel between Margherita and the supplicants.

She continued in her position also after Margherita became a queen dowager in 1900. She and her daughter Maria Cristina, who was appointed dama di corte (lady-in-waiting), is mentioned as the queen dowagers closest companions as a widow.

She died in Gressoney-Saint-Jean on 23 August 1914.
