= Michele Bianchi =

Italian revolutionary syndicalist leader (1883–1930)

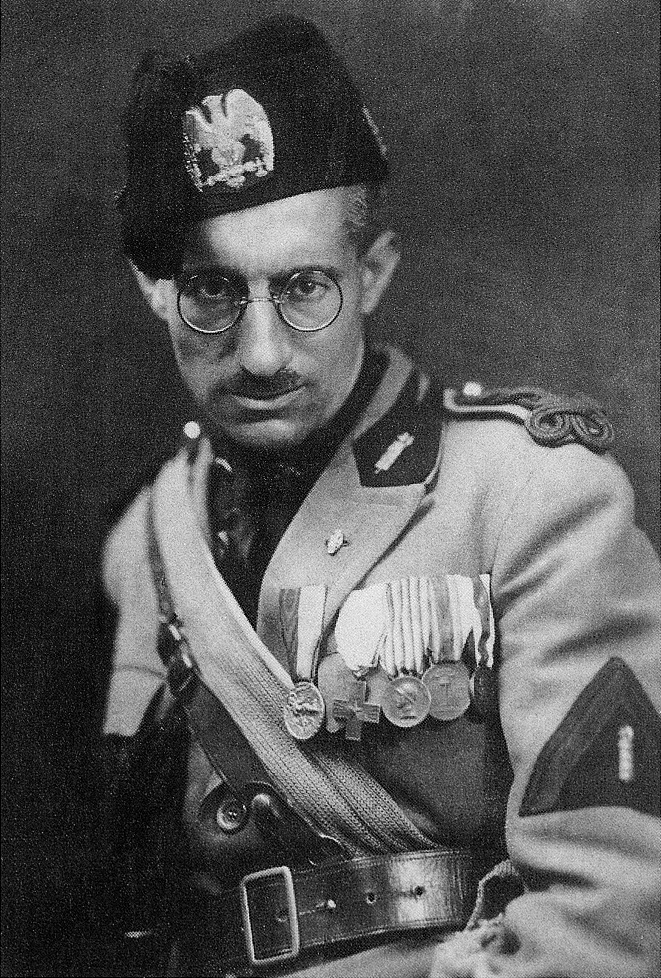

Minister of Public Works
- In office 12 September 1929 – 3 February 1930
- Monarch: Victor Emmanuel III
- Prime Minister: Benito Mussolini
- Preceded by: Benito Mussolini
- Succeeded by: Araldo di Crollalanza

Quadrumvir in the Grand Council of Fascism
- In office 15 December 1922 – 3 February 1930 Serving with Italo Balbo (d. 1940), Emilio De Bono, Cesare Maria De Vecchi

Secretary of the National Fascist Party
- In office 11 November 1921 – 4 November 1922
- Preceded by: Office established
- Succeeded by: Nicola Sansanelli

Personal details
- Born: 22 July 1883 Belmonte Calabro, Kingdom of Italy
- Died: 3 February 1930 (aged 46) Rome, Kingdom of Italy
- Party: National Fascist Party
- Other political affiliations: Italian Socialist Party (1903–1914); Fascio d'Azione Rivoluzionaria (1914–1919); Fasci Italiani di Combattimento (1919–1921)
- Height: 1.65 m (5 ft 5 in)
- Spouse: Maria De Seta

Military service
- Allegiance: Italy
- Branch/service: Royal Italian Army
- Battles/wars: World War I; Italo-Austrian War 1915–1918

Michele Bianchi (22 July 1883 – 3 February 1930) was an Italian revolutionary syndicalist leader who took a position in the Unione Italiana del Lavoro (UIL). He was among the founding members of the Fascist movement. He was widely seen as the dominant leader of the leftist, syndicalist wing of the National Fascist Party. He took an active role in the "interventionist left", where he "espoused an alliance between nationalism and syndicalism." He was one of the most influential politicians of the regime before his succumbing to tuberculosis in 1930. He was also one of the grand architects behind the "Great List" (il listone) which secured the parliamentary majority in favor of the fascists.

== Biography ==
=== Socialism ===
Bianchi was born in Belmonte Calabro (Calabria), in southern Italy.

He studied law at the University of Rome, and dedicated himself from early on to journalism. He became a member of the Italian Socialist Party (PSI), and editor of the Party newspaper Avanti!, presiding over the socialist branch in Rome. A delegate to the Bologna Congress in 1904, he backed the syndicalist line enforced by Arturo Labriola.

In 1905, Bianchi renounced his position at Avanti! and took over leadership of the Gioventù socialista (paper of the Federazione dei Giovani Socialisti—youth wing of the PSI). The antimilitarist campaign he led had him imprisoned, then forcibly settled in Genoa. Bianchi adapted to his new residence and became head of the Ligurian Labour Chamber, as well as editor of the revolutionary paper Lotta socialista.

=== Syndicalism ===
In 1906, after backing several workers' riots, Bianchi expressed his pacifism in front of the PSI leadership, and was not universally welcomed. Transferred to Savona, he played a crucial part in the events that led the syndicalists out of the PSI, between the PSI Bologna Congress of 1907 and the first Syndicalist Congress in July 1908 (in Ferrara).

After being arrested several times and travelling throughout Italy, Bianchi became editor of La Scintilla in 1910; he launched the idea that PSI and syndicalists should reunite on electoral lists for the expected administrative elections. He was outvoted and resorted to expressing his views solely through the paper, which he turned into a daily, the backer of several local proletarian revolts in 1911.

However, Bianchi was forced by the tight budget to shut down La Scintilla, not before he was yet again arrested in Trieste for attacking Giovanni Giolitti as instigator of the Italo-Turkish War. He benefited from an amnesty and returned to Ferrara, where he created and headed the paper La Battaglia (a failed attempt to gain a seat in the elections of 1913). Bianchi moved to Milan, becoming a major figure of the Milanese Syndical Union and the Unione Sindacale Italiana (USI).

=== Fascism ===
Bianchi in the lead followed by Cesare De Vecchi (in light pants), and Benito Mussolini.

Michele Bianchi's attitude during World War I mirrored that of Benito Mussolini: he became an active supporter of Italy's entry into the conflict, and an advocate of irredentism.

In 1915, when Italy joined the Entente Powers, Bianchi volunteered for service and became a junior officer, first in the Infantry, then in the Artillery. With the end of the war, Bianchi joined Mussolini's Fasci italiani di combattimento, and then the National Fascist Party (Partito Nazionale Fascista, or PNF). In 1921, he became the PNF secretary, and attempted to join the Fascists with other right-wing movements (while authorising the numerous violent raids carried out by the Blackshirts).

After stomping out a strike action against Fascist manoeuvres, Bianchi was one of the Quattuorvirate who led the March on Rome, the pseudo-coup d'état that brought Mussolini as prime minister (October 1922). In the newly formed government, he was general secretary of the National Fascist Party and considered "Mussolini's closest collaborator". In short time, Bianchi was dismissed as PNF leader in 1923, while joining the Grand Council of Fascism; in 1924, he was elected to the Chamber of Deputies, but resigned from his government position on 14 March.

In 1925, he was given the position of undersecretary at the Ministry of Public Works, in 1928 the same position at the Internal Affairs one, and on 12 September 1929, he became Minister of Public Works. Again elected to the Chamber, and in failing health, he died soon after in Rome.

== Honours and awards ==
- Commemorative Medal of the March on Rome (Gold)
- War Merit Cross
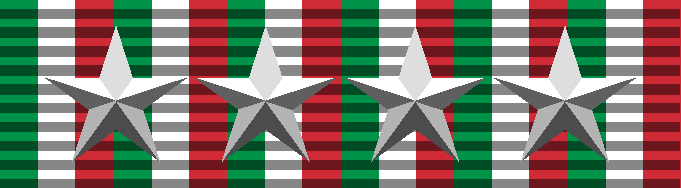
- Commemorative Medal for the Italo-Austrian War 1915–1918 (four years of campaign)
- Commemorative Medal of the Unity of Italy 1848–1918
- Allied Victory Medal
- Honorary Corporal of the Voluntary Militia for National Security
