= March on Rome =

1922 mass demonstration that brought Mussolini to power in Italy

- Part of Fascist and anti-Fascist violence in Italy (1919–1926)
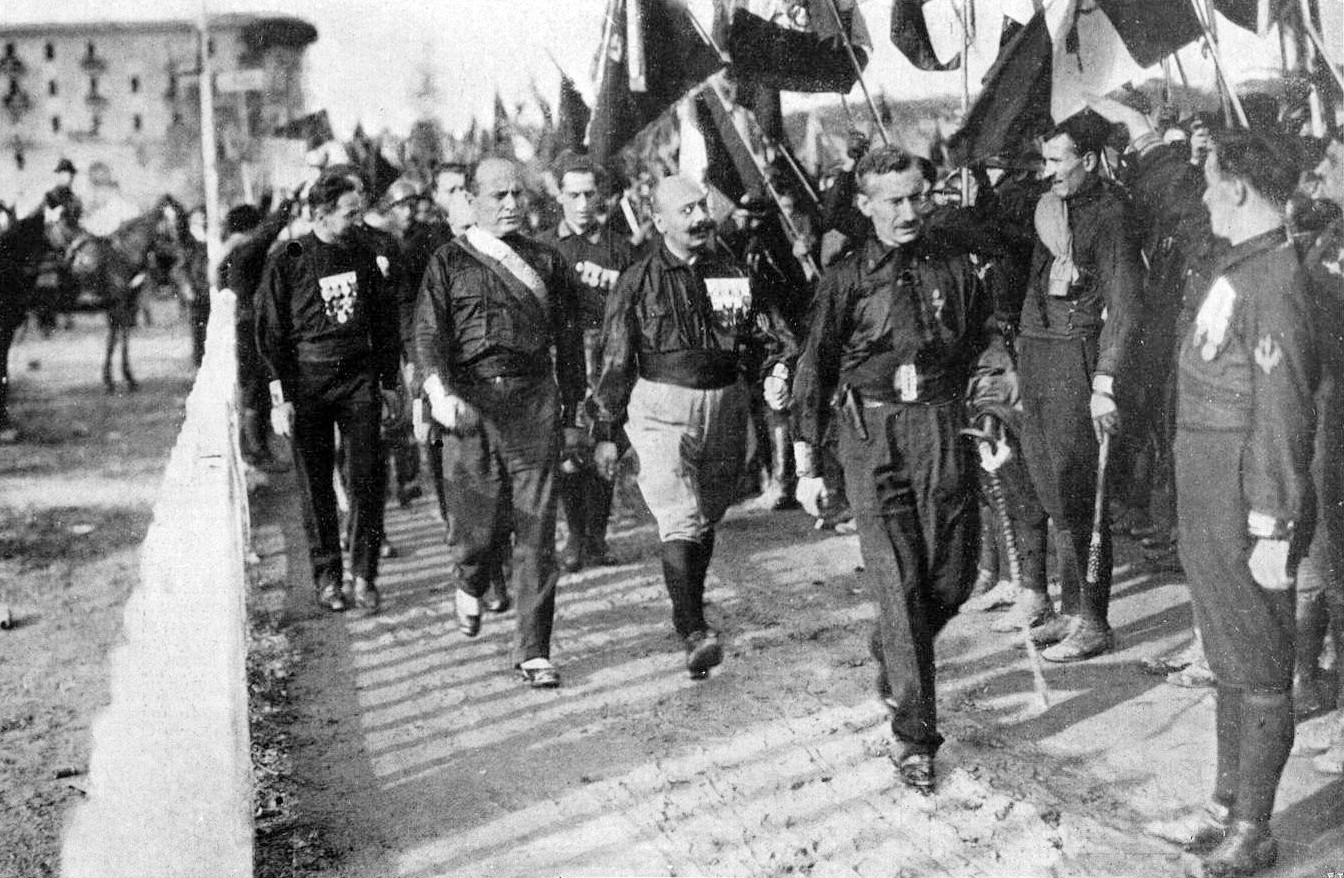
- Benito Mussolini and his Blackshirts during the March
Date	28–31 October 1922
Location	Rome, Kingdom of Italy
Result	Fascist victory

Belligerents
Italian Government: Royal Army; Royal Guards	National Fascist Party: Blackshirts

Commanders and leaders
Victor Emmanuel III; Luigi Facta	Benito Mussolini; Michele Bianchi; Italo Balbo; Emilio De Bono; Cesare Maria De Vecchi

Political support
Italian Liberal Party; Italian Socialist Party; Italian People's Party; Italian Communist Party	Italian Nationalist Association

The March on Rome (Italian: Marcia su Roma) was an organized mass demonstration in October 1922 which resulted in Benito Mussolini's National Fascist Party (Partito Nazionale Fascista, PNF) ascending to power in the Kingdom of Italy.

In late October 1922, Fascist Party leaders planned a march on Rome. On 28 October, the fascist demonstrators and Blackshirt paramilitaries approached the capital; Prime Minister Luigi Facta wished to declare a state of siege, but this was overruled by King Victor Emmanuel III, who, fearing bloodshed, persuaded Facta to resign by threatening to abdicate. On 30 October 1922, the King appointed Mussolini as Prime Minister, thereby transferring political power to the fascists without armed conflict. On 31 October the fascist Blackshirts paraded in Rome, while Mussolini formed his coalition government.

== Background ==
In March 1919, Benito Mussolini founded the first Italian Fasces of Combat (FIC) at the beginning of the so-called Red Biennium, a two-year long social conflict between the Italian Socialist Party (PSI) and the liberal and conservative ruling class. Mussolini's Fascists suffered a defeat in the election of November 1919, winning no seats in the Italian parliament.

During the "two red years", there were numerous strikes, protests against rises in the cost of living, occupations of factories and land by industrial workers or agricultural laborers, and other types of clashes between socialists on one side and landowners and business owners on the other side. The government tried to play the role of neutral mediator, which dissatisfied both sides. Local elites felt themselves vulnerable and established an alliance with the small Fascist movement, which contained many veterans of World War I and had a reputation for violence, in the hope of using Fascist paramilitary squads to destroy socialist organizations.

In September 1919, Gabriele D'Annunzio and his armed followers took over the Adriatic town of Fiume, seeking to secure its transfer from the Kingdom of Serbs, Croats and Slovenes to Italy. D'Annunzio and his followers controlled the city until their expulsion in December 1920. The occupation of Fiume served as a partial "precedent and inspiration" for the March on Rome.

Since 1919, Fascist militias, known as squadristi or "Blackshirts" due to their uniforms, had frequently attacked socialist politicians and militants. In August 1920, the Blackshirt militia was used to break the general strike which originated at the Alfa Romeo factory in Milan, while in November 1920, after the assassination of Giulio Giordani (a right-wing municipal councillor in Bologna), the Blackshirts were active in the suppression of the socialist movement, which included a strong anarcho-syndicalist component, especially in the Po Valley.

Local elections in 1920 were won by the socialists in many towns, cities and villages across Italy, and in response Fascist militias attacked union organizers and municipal administrators, making it difficult for local governments to function. A local deputy from the town of Budrio sent a telegram to the prime minister in October 1921 to report that the Fascists had effectively taken over, that "unions and socialist clubs [were] ordered to dissolve themselves within 48 hours or face physical destruction" and that the "life of the town is paralysed, authorities impotent". Similar situations also occurred in other towns across Northern and Central Italy from 1920 to 1922. The police repeatedly failed to intervene against Fascist violence, and in some cases police officers openly supported the Fascists and supplied them with weapons.

In the 1921 general election the Fascists ran within the National Blocs of Giovanni Giolitti, an anti-socialist coalition of liberals, conservatives and fascists. The Fascists won 35 seats and Mussolini was elected in the Parliament for the first time.

After a few weeks, Mussolini withdrew his support for Giolitti and his Italian Liberal Party (Partito Liberale Italiano, PLI) and attempted to work out a temporary truce with the Socialists by signing the so-called "Pact of Pacification" in the summer of 1921. The Pact led to many protests by the radical members of the Fascist movement, led by local leaders like Roberto Farinacci, who were known as Ras. In July 1921, Giolitti attempted to dissolve the Blackshirts, but he failed; while the Pact with the Socialists was nullified during the Third Fascist Congress on 8–10 November 1921, during which Mussolini promoted a nationalist program and renamed his movement National Fascist Party (PNF), which enrolled 320,000 members by late 1921.

In August 1922, an anti-fascist general strike was organized throughout the country by the socialists. Mussolini declared that the Fascists would suppress the strike themselves if the government did not immediately intervene to stop it, which enabled him to position the Fascist Party as a defender of law and order. On 2 August, in Ancona, Fascist squads moved in from the countryside and razed all buildings occupied by socialists. This was then repeated in Genoa and other cities.

In Milan, on 3 and 4 August, there was street fighting between socialists and fascists; the fascists destroyed the printing presses of the socialist newspaper Avanti! and burned its buildings. Then, with the support of local business owners, they took over local government and expelled the elected socialist administration from the town hall.

The Italian national government in Rome did nothing to react to these developments, and its inaction prompted Mussolini to plan a march on Rome. From their new power base in Milan, the Fascists gathered the financial support of large companies who were determined to fight against "strikes, bolshevism and nationalization". A delegation from the General Confederation of Italian Industry met with Mussolini two days before the March on Rome. Also a few days before the march, Mussolini consulted with the U.S. Ambassador Richard Washburn Child about whether the U.S. government would object to Fascist participation in a future Italian government and Child gave him American support. When Mussolini learned that Prime Minister Luigi Facta had given Gabriele D'Annunzio the mission to organize a large demonstration on 4 November 1922 to celebrate the national victory during the war, he decided to immediately implement the March.

== The March ==
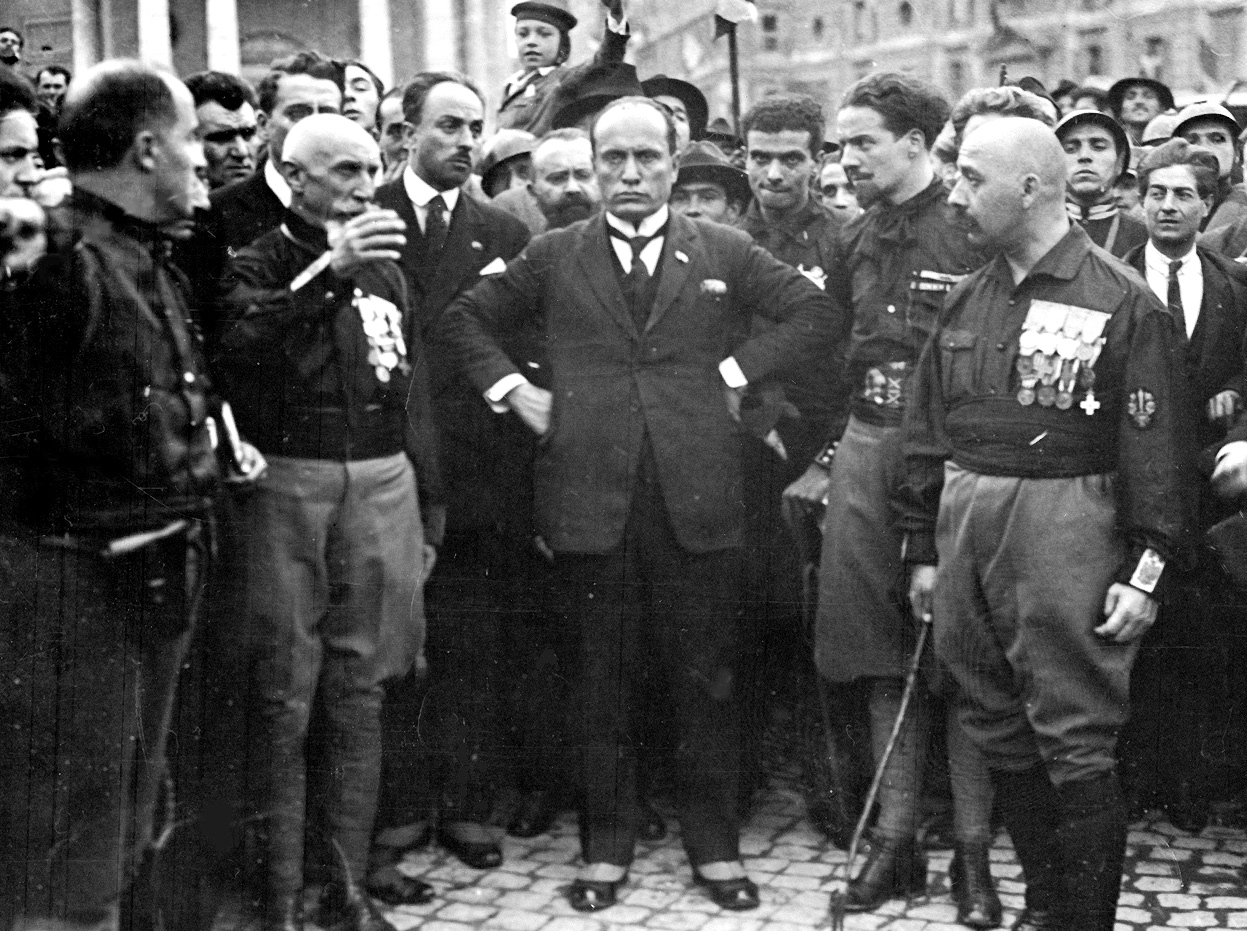
Emilio De Bono, Benito Mussolini, Italo Balbo and Cesare Maria De Vecchi

On 24 October 1922, Mussolini declared in front of 60,000 militants at a Fascist rally in Naples: "Our program is simple: we want to rule Italy." On the following day, the Quadrumvirs, Emilio De Bono, Italo Balbo, Michele Bianchi and Cesare Maria de Vecchi, were appointed by Mussolini at the head of the march, while he went to Milan. He did not participate in the march, though he allowed pictures to be taken of him marching along with the Fascist marchers, and he went to Rome the next day. Generals Gustavo Fara and Sante Ceccherini assisted with the preparations of the March of 18 October. Other organizers of the march included the Marquis Dino Perrone Compagni and Ulisse Igliori.

On 26 October, the former prime minister Antonio Salandra warned prime minister, Luigi Facta, that Mussolini was demanding his resignation and that he was preparing to march on Rome. However, Facta did not believe Salandra and thought that Mussolini would only become a minister of his government. To meet the threat posed by the bands of fascist troops now gathering outside Rome, Luigi Facta (who had resigned but continued to hold power) ordered a state of siege for Rome. Having had previous conversations with the King about the repression of fascist violence, he was sure the King would agree. However, King Victor Emmanuel III refused to sign the military order. The King's decision has been explained as the result of his concerns over the loyalty of the army and the ambitions of his pro-Fascist cousin, the Duke of Aosta, to become king. According to Denis Mack Smith, the King also probably wanted to get rid of the weak Facta government, knowing that Salandra had agreed to form a government that included Mussolini.

On the morning of 28 October, in Milan, Mussolini received a delegation of supportive industrialists at the Il Popolo d'Italia headquarters who urgently requested him to find a compromise with Antonio Salandra. Mussolini was then proposed to rule alongside Salandra; however he refused. Following an analysis of the footage of the time with the facial recognition technique, the presence alongside Mussolini of Raoul Vittorio Palermi, Grand Master of the Gran Loggia d'Italia, was also ascertained.

On 30 October, the King handed power to Mussolini, who was supported by the military, the business class, and the right wing.

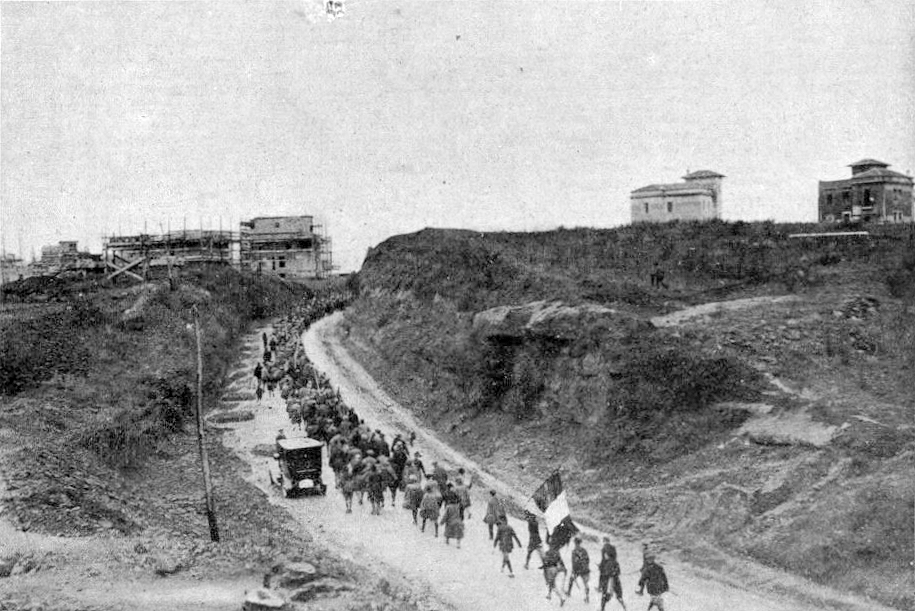
Fascists moving towards Rome

The march itself was composed of fewer than 30,000 men, but the King in part feared a civil war since the squadristi had already taken control of the Po plain and most of the country, while Fascism was no longer seen as a threat to the establishment. Mussolini was asked to form his cabinet on 29 October 1922, while some 25,000 Blackshirts were parading in Rome. Mussolini thus legally reached power, in accordance with the Statuto Albertino, the Italian Constitution. The March on Rome was not the seizure of power which Fascism later celebrated but rather the precipitating force behind a transfer of power within the framework of the constitution. This transition was made possible by the surrender of public authorities in the face of fascist intimidation. Many business and financial leaders believed it would be possible to manipulate Mussolini, whose early speeches and policies emphasized free market and laissez faire economics. This proved overly optimistic, as the Great Depression struck Italy along with the rest of the world in 1929, and Mussolini responded to it by increasing the role of the state in the economy to avoid a banking crisis. By 1934, the Istituto per la Ricostruzione Industriale (Institute for Industrial Reconstruction) had been created to rescue, restructure and finance banks and private companies that went bankrupt during the Great Depression, and by 1937 this Institute had become a major shareholder in Italian industry, controlling all the capital of the military steel sector, 40% of nonmilitary steel, and 30% of the electrical industry.

Back in 1922, in the aftermath of the March on Rome, Mussolini pretended to be willing to take a junior ministry in a Giolitti or Salandra cabinet, but then demanded the presidency of the Council of Ministers. Fearing a conflict with the fascists, the ruling class thus handed power to Mussolini, who went on to install the dictatorship after the 10 June 1924 assassination of Giacomo Matteotti – who had finished writing The Fascisti Exposed: A Year of Fascist Domination – executed by Amerigo Dumini, accused of being the leader of the "Italian Ceka", though there is no evidence for such an organization existing.

== Other participants ==
- Giacomo Acerbo
- Italo Balbo
- Roberto Farinacci
- Giovanni Giuriati
- Serafino Mazzolini
- Ettore Muti
- Dino Grandi
- Cesare Rossi
- Aurelio Padovani
- Alessandro Pavolini
- Carlo Scorza
- Achille Starace
- Harukichi Shimoi

== Commemorative medal ==
The ribbon of the Commemorative Medal of the March on Rome

At the end of 1923, participants in the march received authorization to wear the Commemorative Medal of the March on Rome (Italian: Medaglia commemorativa della Marcia su Roma). In a series of royal decrees between 1926 and 1938, the Kingdom of Italy expanded eligibility for the medal until by mid-1938 all members of the Blackshirts and the Italian Armed Forces were authorized to wear it.

== See also ==
- Beer Hall Putsch (similar action by the Nazi Party inspired by the March on Rome)
- Fascist and anti-Fascist violence in Italy (1919–26)
- Peasant March
- Red Shirts (Mexico)
- Red Shirts (Thailand), Thailand
  - 2010 Thai political protests
- March of the Iron Will
- Joraku
