= Cesare Maria De Vecchi =

Italian politician (1884–1959)

1st Count of Val Cismon Cesare Maria De Vecchi
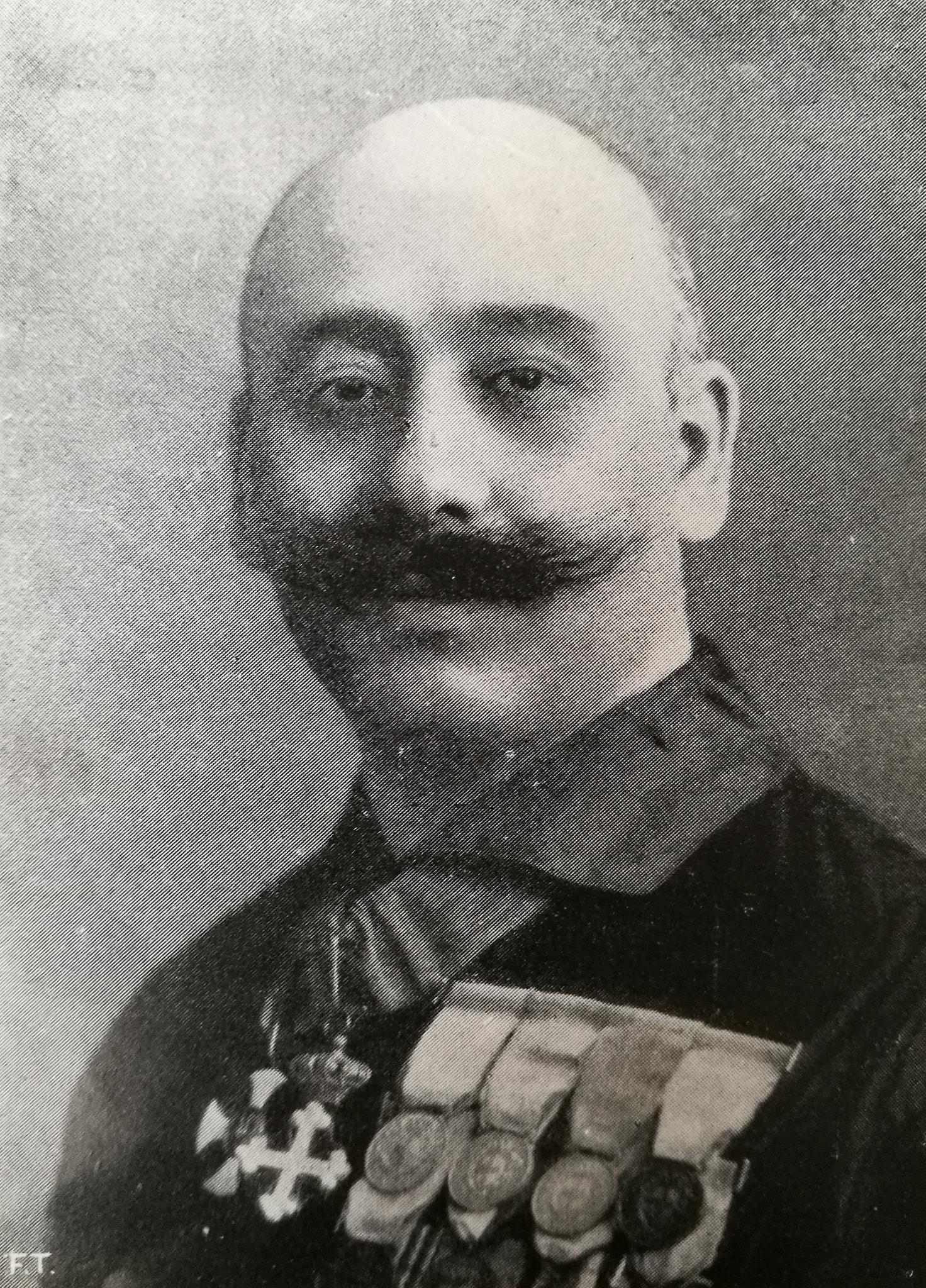

Governor of the Italian Islands of the Aegean
- In office 2 December 1936 – 9 December 1940
- Monarch: Victor Emmanuel III
- Preceded by: Mario Lago
- Succeeded by: Ettore Bastico

Minister of National Education
- In office 24 January 1935 – 15 November 1936
- Prime Minister: Benito Mussolini
- Preceded by: Francesco Ercole
- Succeeded by: Giuseppe Bottai

Governor of Italian Somaliland
- In office 8 December 1923 – 1 June 1928
- Monarch: Victor Emmanuel III
- Preceded by: Carlo Ricci Riveri
- Succeeded by: Guido Corni

Commandant-General of the Blackshirts
- In office 1 February 1923 – 10 July 1925 Serving with Italo Balbo & Emilio De Bono
- Succeeded by: Asclepia Gandolfo

Quadrumvir in the Grand Council of Fascism
- In office 15 December 1922 – 25 July 1943 Serving with Michele Bianchi (d. 1930), Italo Balbo (d. 1940), Emilio De Bono

Member of the Senate of the Kingdom
- In office 15 October 1925 – 21 October 1944
- Appointed by: Victor Emmanuel III

Member of the Chamber of Deputies
- In office 11 June 1921 – 25 January 1924
- Constituency: Turin

Personal details
- Born: 14 November 1884 Casale Monferrato, Italy
- Died: 23 June 1959 (aged 74) Rome, Italy
- Party: National Fascist Party
- Height: 1.63 m (5 ft 4 in)

Military service
- Allegiance: Kingdom of Italy
- Branch/service: Royal Italian Army
- Commands: Blackshirts
- Battles/wars: Battle of Piombino

Cesare Maria De Vecchi, 1st Conte di Val Cismon (14 November 1884 – 23 June 1959) was an Italian soldier, colonial administrator and fascist politician.

== Biography ==
De Vecchi was born in Casale Monferrato on 14 November 1884. After graduating in jurisprudence he became a successful lawyer in Turin. His stance on the First World War was interventionist, and he himself took part in the final events of the conflict, finishing the war with the rank of captain and various decorations for valour. On his return to Italy, he gave his support to the National Fascist Party, in which he would consistently represent the monarchical and 'moderate' wing. He became president of the Turin war veterans and head of the local Fascist squadre. In 1921, he was elected to the Italian Chamber of Deputies.

De Vecchi became Commandant-General of the Milizia (see Blackshirts), was one of the quadrumvirs who organised the March on Rome, and sought to persuade Antonio Salandra to enter into Benito Mussolini's government. He himself became undersecretary at the Treasury and then at the Finance Ministry. In December 1922, he inspired the squadre of Brandimarte to the 1922 Turin massacre (Strage di Torino) and he became known as the most important of the Piedmontese squadristi.

From 1923 to 1928, De Vecchi was governor of Italian Somaliland, a role which took him away from the centre of the Italian political scene. He was made Count of Val Cismon (in memory of the battles fought by his arditi on Monte Grappa in 1918). During this time, De Vecchi oversaw the construction of the Cathedral of Mogadishu and presided over a war of pacification in Somalia. According to Tom Behan, De Vecchi pursued a "scorched earth policy" in Somalia from 1925 to 1927. The first war crime of fascist Italy, the killing of 100 civilians in Merca, was committed under his leadership.

De Vecchi was appointed a senator by King Victor Emmanuel III. He became the first ambassador to the Vatican after the Lateran Treaty of 1929. During the 1930s, he chaired the Piedmont committee for the history of Risorgimento, organized events and lectured to celebrate the period. Between 1935 and 1936, he was national Minister of Education: as such he promoted historiography which identified the House of Savoy as the link between Imperial Rome and the Rome of Fascism, and also worked for the centralisation of the administration of the school system.

On 20 June 1935, De Vecchi got approved the De Vecchi reform, a bill of law which abolished the distinction between high schools depending on the central government and secondary schools that could be financed by local comune and provinces. The control of the whole high school education was centralized on the government which decided scholastic curriculums and applied censorship upon scholastic textbooks before and after their publication.

While serving as the Governor of the Island of Rhodes, was responsible for enacting the Italian racial laws, which restricted the civil rights of Italian Jews, banned books written by Jewish authors, and excluded Jews from public offices and higher education. Additional laws stripped Jews of their assets, restricted travel, and finally, provided for their confinement in internal exile, as was done for political prisoners. In 1935 De Vecchi forced the Jewish community to relocate their cemetery from its historical location in the old city to its current location on the road to the Kallithea neighborhood and forcibly required that they furnish the tombstones of their ancestors for rebuilding the Palace of the Grand Master of the Knights of Rhodes.

Writing in his War Diaries, (entry for March 6, 1940) Count Galeazzi Ciano, then Italy's foreign minister wrote: "For the first time I found a person who wants to declare War with the Germans against France and England. This person is no less than the intrepid Cesare Maria de Vecchi di Val Cismon! The Americans say that a sucker is born every minute; one only has to look for him. This time I have found one. Cesare Maria is, above all, a man of pomposity and vain illusions, who dreams of obtaining a marshal's baton and decorations and hopes to gain them through the blood of others." From 1939 to 1943, he was also president of the Italian Numismatic Institute.

From 1936 to 1941, De Vecchi acted as governor of the Italian Aegean Islands promoting the official use of the Italian language. In the following year he was appointed to the Grand Council of Fascism and on 25 July 1943, he voted in favour of Dino Grandi's order of the day which deposed Benito Mussolini of his role as Fascist Duce (leader). On 1 August 1943, he was promoted to Generale di Divisione and given command of the newly forming 215th Coastal Division in Florence. After the announcement of the Armistice of Cassibile on 8 September 1943, De Vecchi authorized German forces to enter the port of Piombino and forbade any act of resistance. Nevertheless, units of the Royal Italian Navy and Royal Italian Army supported by the local population prevented the Germans from landing at Piombino, killed about 100 and captured over 200 Wehrmacht soldiers. The following day De Vecchi ordered the freeing of the Germans and returning their weapons to them, after which he signed the surrender of his Division to the Germans. On 13 September, De Vecchi with a pass given to him by German Field Marshal Albert Kesselring left his positions and took refuge in Piedmont.

In early October 1943, De Vecchi went into hiding with the help of the order of the Salesians of Don Bosco, who hid him from Mussolini's Italian Social Republic (Repubblica Sociale Italiana, or RSI), which condemned De Vecchi to death in absentia in the Verona trial in January 1944. The Salesians hid De Vecchi even after the war until 1947 when he escaped to Argentina on a Paraguayan passport. After returning to Italy in 1949, De Vecchi supported the neo-fascist Italian Social Movement (Movimento Sociale Italiano, or MSI) together with Rodolfo Graziani. However, he refused to accept any political or institutional office within the MSI. De Vecchi died in Rome in 1959.

== Honors and awards ==
=== Italian ===
- Knight Grand Cross of the Order of Saints Maurice and Lazarus (24 June 1929)
- Knight of the Military Order of Savoy
- Knight Grand Cross of the Order of the Crown of Italy (18 November 1923)
- Knight Grand Cross of the Colonial Order of the Star of Italy (Royal Decree of 8 April 1925)
- Knight of the Civil Order of Savoy
- Silver Medal of Military Valor (three awards)
- Bronze Medal of Military Valor (two awards)
- Bronze Medal for Civil Valor
- War Merit Cross
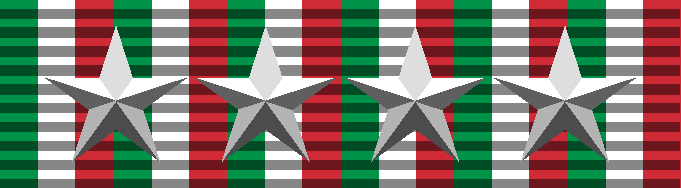
- Commemorative Medal for the Italo-Austrian War 1915–1918 (four years of campaign)
- Commemorative Medal of the Unity of Italy 1848–1918
- Allied Victory Medal
- Commemorative Medal of the March on Rome (Gold)
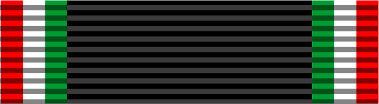
- Cross for Length of Service in the Voluntary Militia for National Security

=== Foreign ===
- Knight of the Order of the Golden Spur (Order of the Golden Militia) (Holy See, 7 March 1935) (For service as Minister of National Education).
- Knight Grand Cross of the Order of Pope Pius IX (Holy See, 7 January 1932) (For service as Ambassador of Italy to the Holy See).
- Knight Grand Cross of the Order of Malta (Sovereign Military Order of Malta, 12 January 1929)
