= Italo Balbo =

Italian Marshal of the Air Force and minister (1896–1940)

Maresciallo d'Italia Italo Balbo
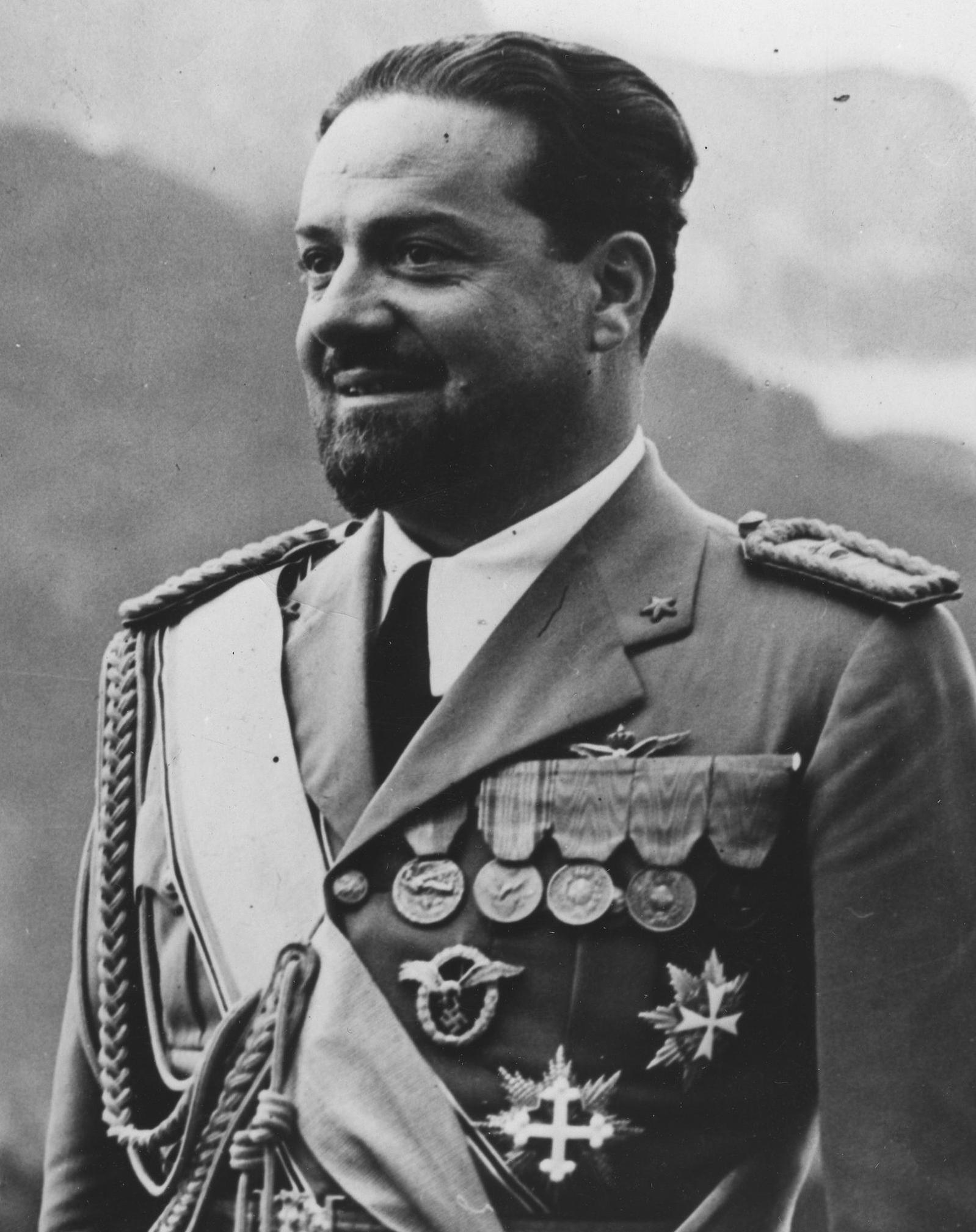
- Balbo in 1938–1940

Governor-General of Italian Libya
- In office 1 January 1934 – 28 June 1940
- Monarch: Victor Emmanuel III
- Prime Minister: Benito Mussolini
- Preceded by: Office created
- Succeeded by: Rodolfo Graziani

Minister of the Air Force
- In office 12 September 1929 – 6 November 1933
- Prime Minister: Benito Mussolini
- Preceded by: Benito Mussolini
- Succeeded by: Benito Mussolini

Quadrumvir in the Grand Council of Fascism
- In office 15 December 1922 – 28 June 1940 Serving with Michele Bianchi (d. 1930), Emilio De Bono, Cesare Maria De Vecchi

Member of the Chamber of Deputies
- In office 24 May 1924 – 2 March 1939
- Constituency: Emilia-Romagna

Personal details
- Born: 6 June 1896 Ferrara, Kingdom of Italy
- Died: 28 June 1940 (aged 44) Tobruk, Italian Libya
- Party: Italian Fasces of Combat (1919–1921); National Fascist Party (1921–1940)
- Height: 1.74 m (5 ft 9 in)
- Spouse: Emanuela Florio (m. 1924)
- Children: 3

Military service
- Allegiance: Kingdom of Italy
- Branch/service: MVSN; Regia Aeronautica
- Years of service: 1915–1940
- Rank: Maresciallo dell'Aria (Marshal of the Air Force)
- Battles/wars: World War I: Italian Front; World War II: North African campaign

Italo Balbo (6 June 1896 – 28 June 1940) was an Italian fascist politician and Blackshirts' leader who served as Italy's Marshal of the Air Force, Governor-General of Italian Libya and Commander-in-Chief of Italian North Africa. Due to his young age, he was sometimes seen as a possible successor to dictator Benito Mussolini.

After serving in World War I, Balbo became the leading Fascist party organizer in his home region of Ferrara. He was one of the Quadrumvirs, the four principal architects (Quadrumviri del Fascismo) of the March on Rome that brought Mussolini and the Fascists to power in 1922, along with Michele Bianchi, Emilio De Bono and Cesare Maria De Vecchi. In 1926, he began the task of building the Italian Royal Air Force and took a leading role in popularizing aviation in Italy, and promoting Italian aviation to the world. In 1933, perhaps to relieve tensions surrounding him in Italy, he was given the task of governing Italian Libya, where he resided for the remainder of his life. Balbo, hostile to antisemitism, was among a minority of leading Fascists to oppose Mussolini's alliance with Nazi Germany. Early in World War II, he was killed by friendly fire when his plane was shot down over Tobruk by Italian anti-aircraft guns who misidentified it.

== Early life ==
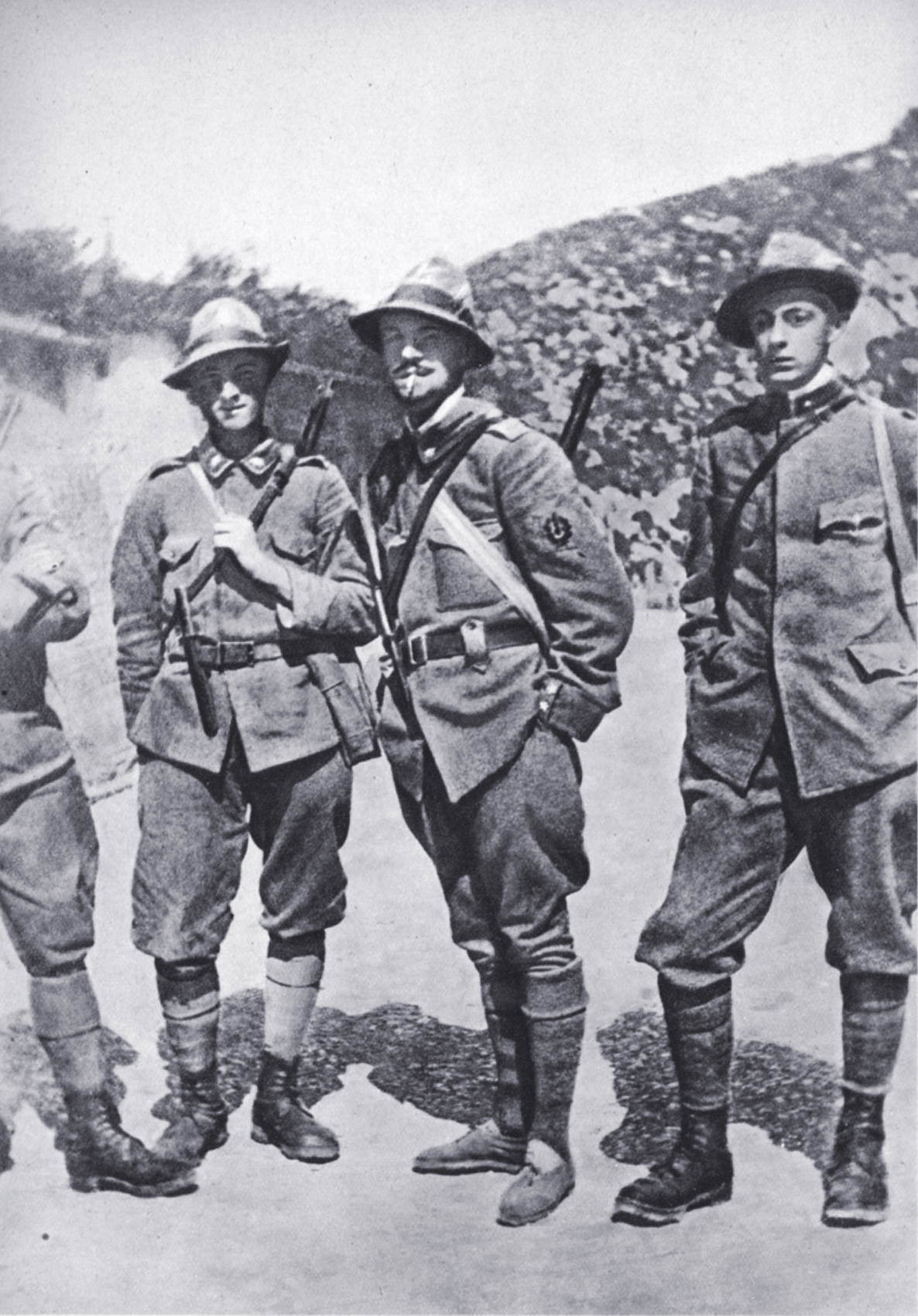
Italo Balbo (center) during World War I in 1918

In 1896, Balbo was born in Quartesana (part of Ferrara) in the Kingdom of Italy. Balbo was very politically active from an early age. At 14 years of age, he attempted to join in a Revolt in Albania under Ricciotti Garibaldi, Giuseppe Garibaldi's son.

As World War I broke out and Italy declared its neutrality, Balbo supported joining the war on the side of the Allies. He joined in several pro-war rallies. Once Italy entered the war in 1915, Balbo joined the Italian Royal Army (Regio Esercito) as an officer candidate and served with the Alpini (mountain infantry). His first assignment was with the Alpini Battalion "Val Fella", 8th Alpini Regiment, before volunteering for flight training on 16 October 1917. A few days later, the Austro-Hungarian and German armies broke the Italian lines in the Battle of Caporetto, and Balbo returned to the front, now assigned to the Alpini Battalion "Pieve di Cadore", 7th Alpini Regiment, where he took command of an assault platoon. At the end of the war, Balbo had earned one bronze and two silver medals for military valour and reached the rank of Captain (Capitano) due to courage under fire.

After the war, Balbo completed the studies he had begun in Florence in 1914–15. He obtained a law degree and a degree in Social Sciences. His final thesis was written on "the economic and social thought of Giuseppe Mazzini", and he researched under the supervision of the patriotic historian Niccolò Rodolico. Balbo was a Republican, but he hated Socialists and the unions and cooperatives associated with them.

Balbo returned to his home town to work as a bank clerk. In 1920, Balbo was initiated in the regular Masonic Lodge "Giovanni Bovio", affiliated to the Gran Loggia d'Italia. Subsequently, he received the degree of Orator in the Masonic Lodge" Girolamo Savonarola" in Ferrara, joined by various other party officials. He left the lodge on 18 February 1923, just three days before the vote of the Grand Council of Fascism which forbade fascists to be members of the Freemasonry.

== Blackshirt leader ==
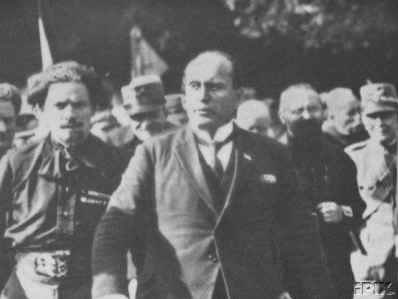
Balbo (left) and Italian dictator Benito Mussolini

In 1921, Balbo joined the newly created National Fascist Party (Partito Nazionale Fascista, or PNF) and soon became a secretary of the Ferrara Fascist organization. He began to organize Fascist gangs and formed his own group nicknamed Celibano, after their favorite drink. They broke strikes for local landowners and attacked communists and socialists in Portomaggiore, Ravenna, Modena, and Bologna. The group once raided the Estense Castle in Ferrara. Balbo had become one of the Ras, adopted from an Ethiopian title somewhat equivalent to a duke, of the Fascist hierarchy by 1922, establishing his local leadership in the party. The Ras typically wished for a more decentralized Fascist Italian state to be formed, against Mussolini's wishes.

At 26 years of age, Balbo was the youngest of the Quadrumvirs: the four main planners of the March on Rome. The Quadrumvirs were Michele Bianchi (age 39), Cesare Maria De Vecchi (38), Emilio De Bono (56), and Balbo. Mussolini himself (39) would not participate in the risky operation that ultimately brought Italy under Fascist rule. In 1923, as one of the Quadrumvirs, Balbo became a founding member of the Grand Council of Fascism (Gran Consiglio del Fascismo). This same year, he was implicated in the murder of anti-Fascist parish priest Giovanni Minzoni in Argenta. He fled to Rome and in 1924 became General Commander of the Fascist militia and undersecretary for National Economy in 1925.

== Aviator ==
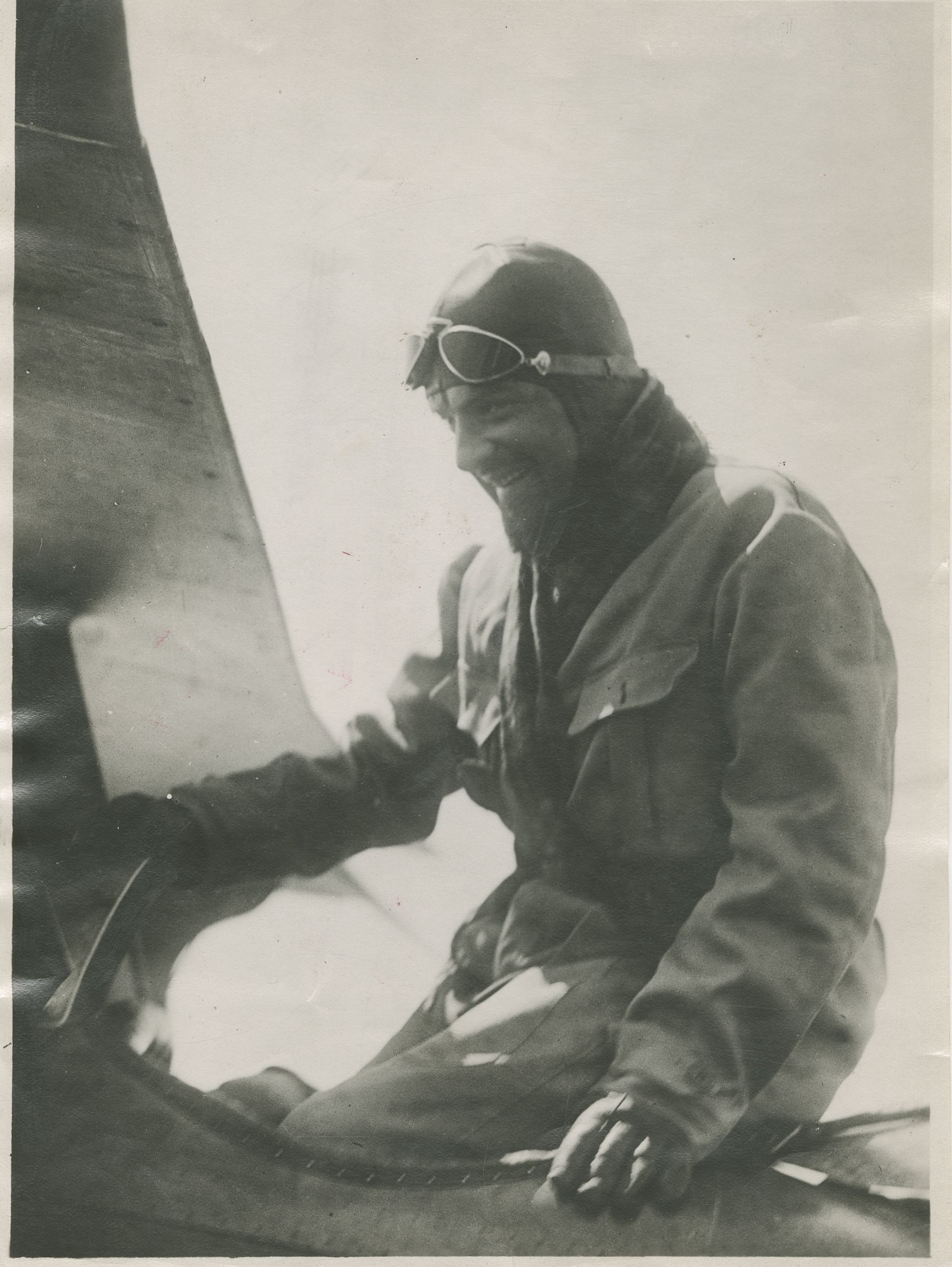
Italo Balbo in 1930

Poster for Italo Balbo's transatlantic flight to the Century of Progress in Chicago

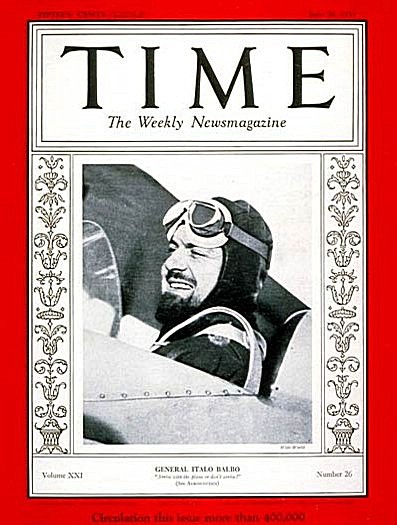
Balbo featured on Time magazine, 26 June 1933

On 6 November 1926, though he had only a little experience in aviation, Balbo was appointed Secretary of State for Air, with powers similar to a minister. He went through an intensive course of flying instruction and began building the Italian Royal Air Force (Regia Aeronautica Italiana). On 19 August 1928, he became General of the Air Force and on 12 September 1929 Minister of the Air Force.

Italians at this time showed great interest in aviation. In 1925, Francesco de Pinedo flew a seaplane from Italy to Australia to Japan and back again to Italy. Mario De Bernardi successfully raced seaplanes internationally. In 1928, Arctic explorer Umberto Nobile piloted the airship Italia on an arctic polar expedition.

Balbo organized two air cruises: the first in the Western Mediterranean (25 May-2 June 1928), the second in the Eastern Mediterranean (5-19 June 1929). In the following two years he led some transatlantic flights. The first such flight saw twelve Savoia-Marchetti S.55 flying boats travelling from Orbetello Airfield, Italy to Rio de Janeiro, Brazil between 17 December 1930 and 15 January 1931. Some aircraft were lost and there were some casualties.

The Decennial Air Cruise (Italian: Crociera del Decennale) featured the so-called "Italian Air Armada". From 1 July to 12 August 1933, twenty-four seaplanes flew a round-trip from Rome to the Century of Progress exposition in Chicago, Illinois. The outbound flight had eight legs: Orbetello – Amsterdam – Derry – Reykjavík – Cartwright – Shediac – Montreal – Lake Michigan near Burnham Park, Chicago – New York City. In honor of this feat, Mussolini donated a column from Ostia to the city of Chicago: the Balbo Monument. It still stands by the Lakefront Trail, a little south of Soldier Field. Chicago renamed the former 7th Street "Balbo Drive" and staged a great parade in Balbo's honour. The Newfoundland Post Office overprinted one of their 75-cent airmail stamps, issued just two months previously, for the event: "General Balbo Flight, Labrador, The Land of Gold".

From Chicago, the "Armada" flew to New York City with an escort of 36 U.S. airplanes. New York gave a warm welcome to the pilots on Broadway. Millions of people watched the parade of dozens of cars escorted by police horses along the streets of Manhattan. Balbo featured on the 26 June 1933 cover of Time.

During Balbo's stay in the United States, President Franklin Roosevelt invited him to lunch and presented him with the Distinguished Flying Cross. He was awarded the 1931 Harmon Trophy. The Sioux even honorarily adopted Balbo as "Chief Flying Eagle". Balbo received a warm welcome in the United States, especially from the large Italian-American populations in Chicago and New York City. To a cheering mass in Madison Square Garden, he said: "Be proud you are Italians. Mussolini has ended the era of humiliations." The term "Balbo" entered common usage to describe any large formation of aircraft.

The return flight from New York stopped in Shoal Harbour at Clarenville, Newfoundland, on 26 July 1933. A road overlooking the bay used by the flying-boats was renamed Balbo Drive, a name it still carries today. On 12 August 1933, Balbo's formation departed Clarenville for the Azores, Lisbon, and Rome. Back home in Italy, Balbo was promoted to the newly created rank of Marshal of the Air Force (Italian: Maresciallo dell'Aria).

Following his return to Italy, Balbo proposed his vision for a reorganised Italian military. He advocated reducing the Royal Italian Army to twenty divisions: ten motorised, five Alpine and five armoured, all well-equipped, trained and prepared for amphibious warfare; while the navy would have three marine divisions. The proposed reorganised army would become an expeditionary force that could rapidly deploy by sea or train to Italy's borders (including Libya). However, such a proposal proved financially impossible: it would have required an unprecedented increase in the Italian defence budget.

== Governor of Libya ==
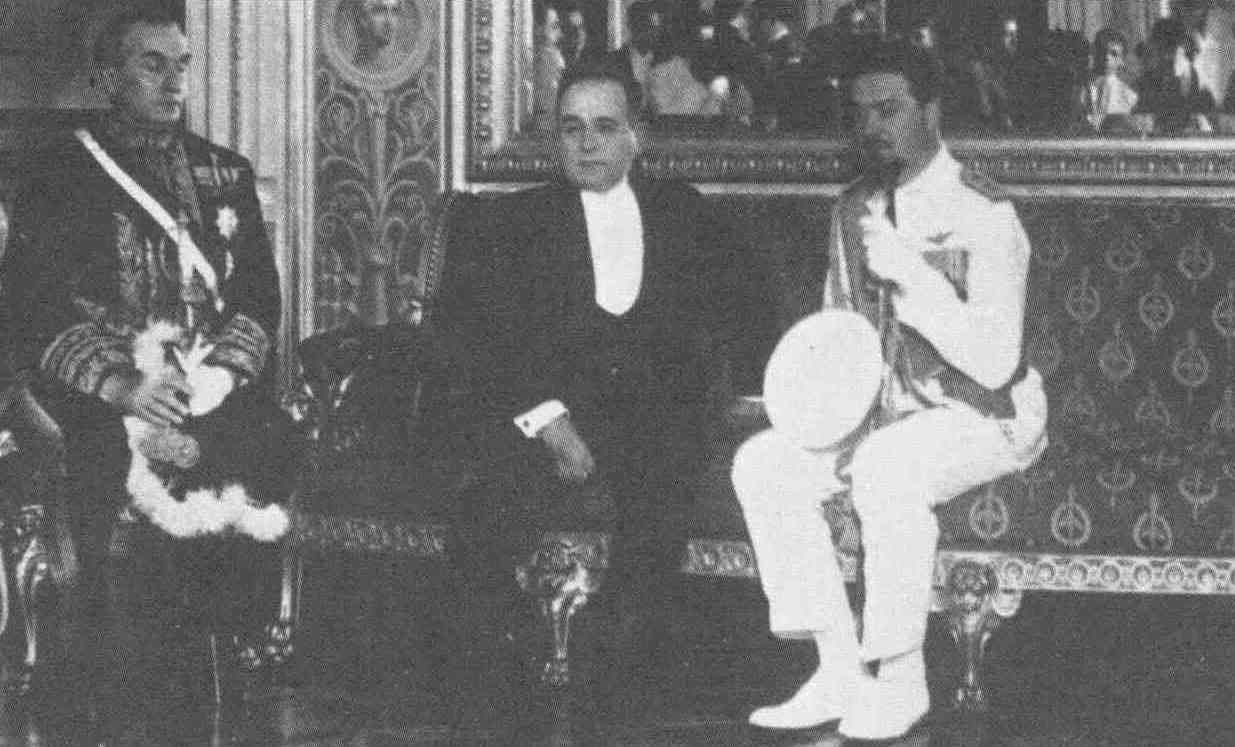
Balbo (in white military uniform) with Brazilian President Getúlio Vargas in the Catete Palace in Rio de Janeiro, Brazil, 15 January 1931

On 7 November 1933, Balbo was appointed Governor-General of the Italian colony of Libya. Mussolini looked to the flamboyant Air Marshal to be the condottiero of Italian ambition and extend Italy's new horizons in Africa. Balbo's task was to assert Italy's rights in the indeterminate zones leading to Lake Chad from Tummo in the west and from Kufra in the east towards the Sudan. Balbo had already made a flying visit to Tibesti. By securing the "Tibesti-Borku strip" and the "Sarra Triangle", Italy would be in a good position to demand further territorial concessions in Africa from France and Britain. Mussolini even had his sights set on the former German colony of Kamerun. From 1922, the colony had become the League of Nations mandate territories of French Cameroun and British Cameroons. Mussolini pictured an Italian Cameroon and a territorial corridor connecting that territory to Libya. An Italian Cameroon would give Italy a port on the Atlantic Ocean, the mark of a world power. Ultimately, control of the Suez Canal and of Gibraltar would complete the picture.

As of 1 January 1934, Tripolitania, Cyrenaica and Fezzan were merged to form the new colony and Balbo moved to Libya. At that stage, Balbo had apparently caused bad blood in the party, possibly because of jealousy and individualist behaviour. Being appointed Governor-General of Libya was an effective exile from politics in Rome where Mussolini considered him a threat, both for his fame and, more importantly, because of his close relationship with the possibly anti-fascist Crown Prince Umberto. Italian newspapers reportedly could not mention Balbo's name more than once a month. "Benito in Balboland," an article in 22 March 1937 issue of Time Magazine, played with the conflict between Mussolini and Balbo. Balbo was still well known in the United States for his visit to the Century of Progress exhibition. While Governor, Balbo ordered Jews who closed their businesses on the Sabbath to be whipped. Balbo commissioned the Marble Arch to mark the border between Tripolitania and Cyrenaica. It was unveiled on 16 March 1937.

=== Abyssinia crisis ===
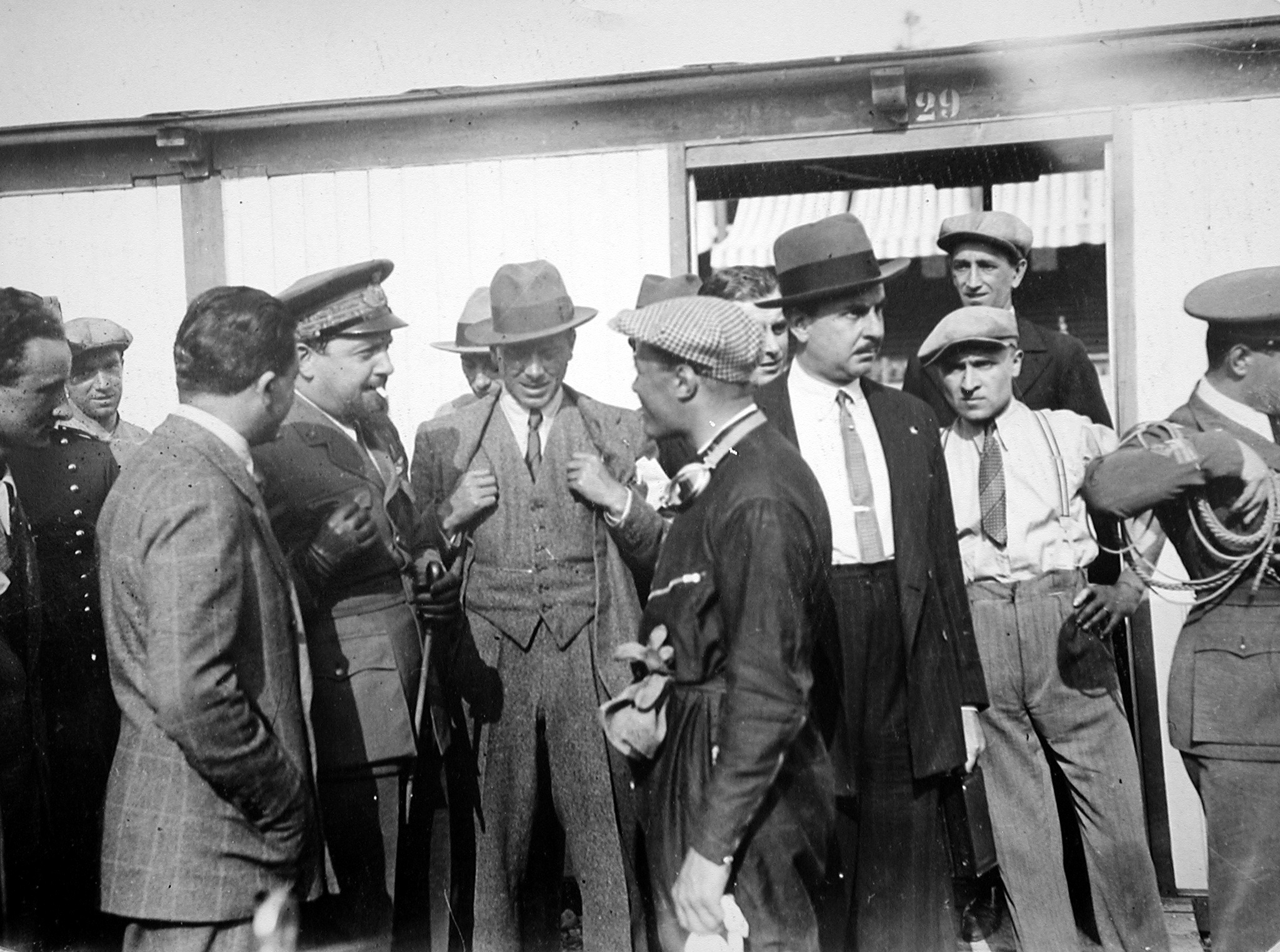
Balbo appeared in military uniform at the Targa Florio road race

In 1935, as the "Abyssinia Crisis" worsened, Balbo began preparing plans to attack Egypt and Sudan. As Mussolini made his intentions to invade Ethiopia clear, relations between Italy and the United Kingdom became more tense. Fearing a "Mad Dog" act by Mussolini against British forces and possessions in the Mediterranean, Britain reinforced its fleet in the region and also its military forces in Egypt. Balbo reasoned that, should Britain choose to close the Suez Canal, Italian troop transports would be prevented from reaching Eritrea and Somalia. Thinking that the planned attack on Abyssinia would be crippled, Balbo asked for reinforcements in Libya. He calculated that such a gesture would make him a national hero and restore him to the centre of the political stage. The 7th Blackshirt Division (Cirene) and 700 aircraft were immediately sent from Italy to Libya. Balbo may have received intelligence concerning the feasibility of advancing into Egypt and Sudan from the famous desert researcher László Almásy.

By 1 September 1935, Balbo secretly deployed Italian forces along the border with Egypt without the British knowing anything about it. At the time, British intelligence knowledge concerning the events in Libya was woefully inadequate. In the end, Mussolini rejected Balbo's over-ambitious plan to attack Egypt and Sudan and London learned about his deployments in Libya from Rome.

=== Munich crisis ===
The "Anglo-Italian Agreement" of April 1938 brought a temporary cessation of tensions between the United Kingdom and the Kingdom of Italy. For Balbo, the agreement meant the immediate loss of 10,000 Italian troops; it was characterised by renewed promises of undertakings that Mussolini had previously broken and he could easily break again. By the time of the "Munich Crisis", Balbo had his 10,000 troops back.

At this time, Italian aircraft were making frequent overflights of Egypt and Sudan and Italian pilots were being familiarised with the routes and airfields. In 1938 and 1939, Balbo himself made a number of flights from Libya across the Sudan to Italian East Africa ('Africa Orientale Italiana', or AOI). He even flew along the border between AOI and British East Africa (modern Kenya). In January 1939, Balbo was accompanied on one of his flights by German Colonel-General Ernst Udet.

There were distinct signs of German military and diplomatic cooperation with the Italians. General Udet was accompanied by the Head of the German Mechanization Department, and the German military attache to Rome paid a long visit to Egypt. A German Military Mission was present in Benghazi and German pilots were engaged in navigational training flights.

Balbo began road construction projects such as the Via Balbia in an attempt to attract Italian immigrants to Libya. He also made efforts to draw Muslims into the Fascist cause. By 1938, Balbo was the only member of the Fascist regime who strongly opposed the new legislation against the Jews, the Italian "Racial Laws".

In 1939, after the German invasion of Poland, Balbo visited Rome to express his displeasure at Mussolini's support for German dictator Adolf Hitler. Balbo was the only Fascist of rank to publicly criticize this aspect of Mussolini's foreign policy. He argued that Italy should side with the United Kingdom, but he attracted little following to his argument. When informed of Italy's formal alliance with Nazi Germany, Balbo exclaimed: "You will all wind up shining the shoes of the Germans!"

=== World War II ===
At the time of the Italian declaration of war on 10 June 1940, Balbo was the Governor-General of Libya and Commander-in-Chief of Italian North Africa (Africa Settentrionale Italiana, or ASI). He became responsible for planning an invasion of Egypt. After the surrender of France, Balbo was able to shift much of the men and material of the Italian Fifth Army on the Tunisian border to the Tenth Army on the Egyptian border. While he had expressed many legitimate concerns to Mussolini and to Marshal Pietro Badoglio, the Chief-of-Staff in Rome, Balbo still planned to invade Egypt as early as 17 July 1940.

== Death ==
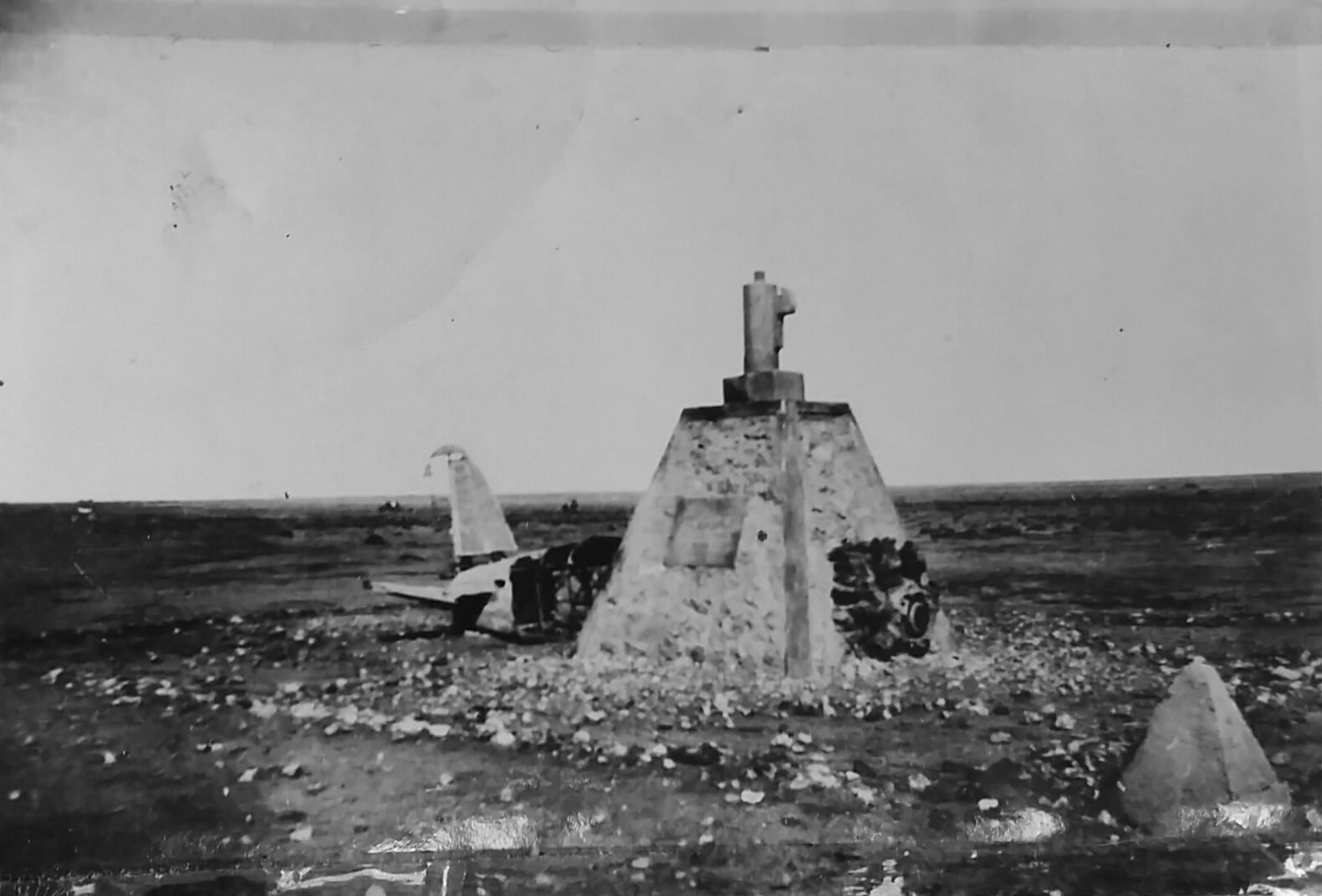
Original gravesite of Balbo in Libya

On 28 June 1940, Balbo was a passenger on a Savoia-Marchetti SM.79 headed for the Libyan airfield of Tobruk, arriving shortly after the airfield had been attacked by British aircraft. Italian anti-aircraft batteries defending the airfield misidentified the aircraft as British, opening fire upon it as it attempted a landing. It was downed and all on board perished.

Eyewitness General Felice Porro reported that the cruiser San Giorgio, serving as a floating anti-aircraft battery, began firing on Balbo's aircraft, followed by the airfield's anti-aircraft guns. It remains unclear which of them ultimately led to his aircraft being downed.

Rumours that Balbo was assassinated on Mussolini's orders have been conclusively debunked. Instead, it is generally accepted that Balbo's aircraft was simply misidentified as an enemy target, as it was flying low and coming in against the sun, in addition to the fact of its arrival shortly after an aerial attack by British Bristol Blenheims.

Upon hearing of the death of Balbo, the Commander-in-Chief of the RAF Middle East Command ordered an aircraft dispatched to fly over the Italian airfield to drop a wreath, with the following note of condolence:

The British Royal Air Force expresses its sympathy in the death of General Balbo – a great leader and gallant aviator, personally known to me, whom fate has placed on the other side. [signed] Arthur Longmore

Balbo's remains were buried outside Tripoli on 4 July 1940, planned to be returned to Italy after the end of the war and reburied with full military honours. Following Italian defeat and the fall of the Fascist regime, these plans were abandoned. In 1970, Balbo's remains were brought back to Italy and buried in Orbetello by Balbo's family after Muammar Gaddafi threatened to disinter the Italian cemeteries in Tripoli.

== Memorial ==
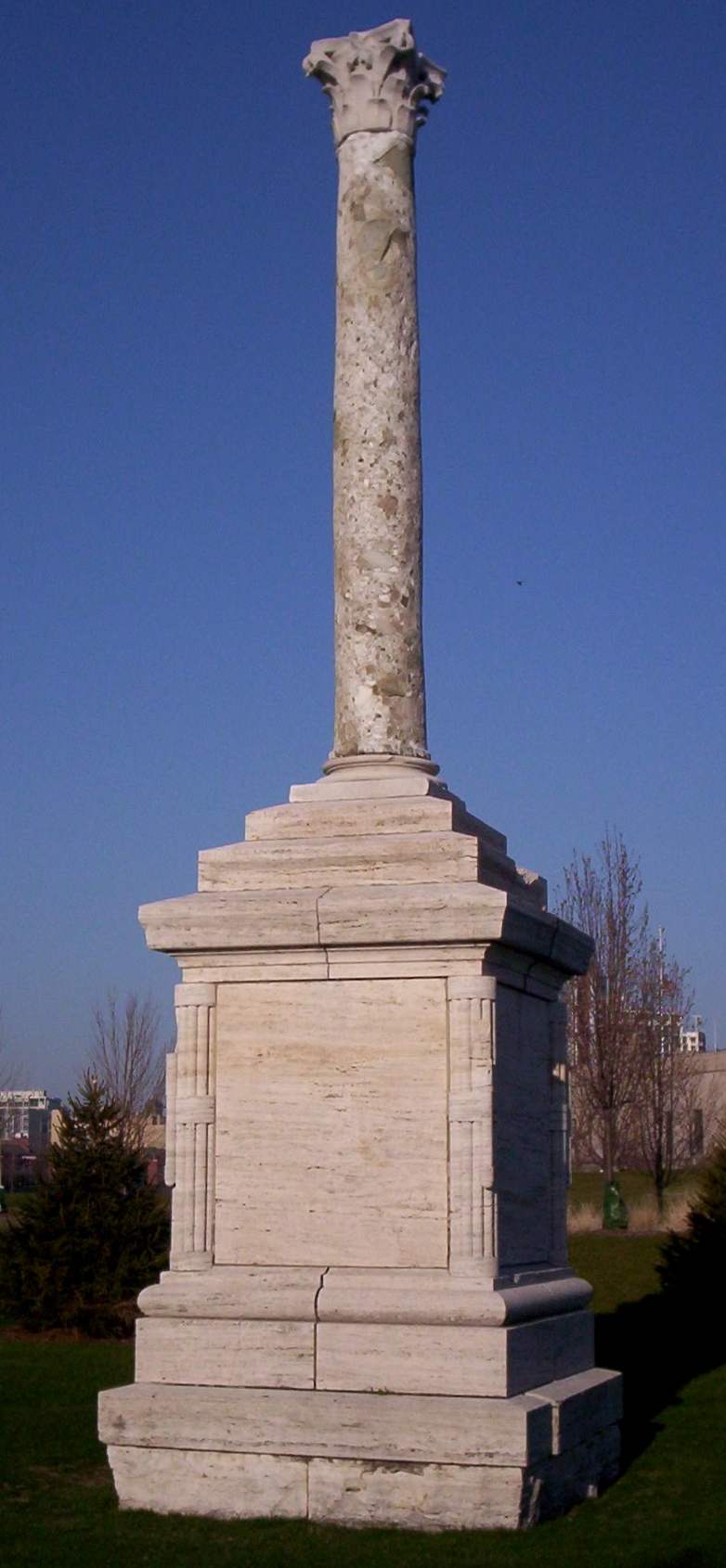
Balbo Column, Chicago

In 1933, Benito Mussolini presented the city of Chicago with a monument to Balbo. Balbo Drive is a well-known street in the heart of downtown. In 2017, a campaign was launched to rename it. After encountering opposition, the city instead elected to rename another street, Congress Parkway, in honour of Ida B. Wells, a leading Chicago journalist, anti-lynching activist and suffragette.

In post-fascist Italy, most monuments and streets named after Balbo during the Fascist Regime reverted to their pre-fascist names, such as in Palermo, liberated by the Allies in July 1943, where Piazza Italo Balbo reverted to its former name, Piazza Bologna, or were named after anti-fascist partisans, such as in Sanremo, where "Via Italo Balbo" was renamed after partisan Luigi Nuvoloni.

== Honors and awards ==
=== Italian ===
- Knight Grand Cross of the Order of Saints Maurice and Lazarus
- Knight Grand Cross of the Order of the Crown of Italy
- Knight Grand Cross of the Colonial Order of the Star of Italy
- Gold Medal of Military Valor (posthumous)

"Marshal of the Air Force, Quadrumvir, and faithful soldier of the Duce in the hour of vigilance, of combat, and of victory, unsurpassed flier acros continents and oceans, colonizer of masses and ruler of imperial lands with weapons, with laws, and with works of Roman greatness, in the sky over Tobruk, while he was preparing to hurl the valiant troops and the mighty flocks across the border, he concluded his heroic life with the supreme sacrifice, in the memory of the people eternalizing the deeds and glories of the race."
—Sky over Tobruk, 28 June 1940

- Gold Medal of Aeronautic Valor

"He participated in the Transatlantic Air Cruise as pilot and commander."
— Orbetello–Rio de Janeiro, 17 December 1930–15 January 1931

- Silver Medal of Military Valor (first award)

"Commander of a platoon of Arditi, charged with carrying out a special night reconnaissance service in an extremely treacherous period and terrain and against a particularly active enemy, proud of a good success achieved, he always demonstrated great personal courage and brilliant qualities as a soldier and commander. Often, to fulfill his mandate, he also engaged himself against an enemy of superior strength, attacking him with such vehemence that it was then necessary to intervene with our machine guns and even our artillery to disengage him. Especially commendable was the action he carried out on the night of 14 August, also reported in the war bulletin of the supreme command of the 15th."
— Dosso Casina, July–August 1918

- Silver Medal of Military Valor (second award)

"A young man animated by pure ideals, he gave continuous evidence of great contempt for danger and high enthusiasm. Commander of a unit of Arditi, he marked the bright path of duty for the units of his own battalion in the attack on an enemy position strenuously defended by numerous machine guns, managing first of all to set foot in the enemy trench. The admirable momentum of the successive waves stopped by the deadly fire of the enemy, he was left alone among the dead and wounded and, pretending to be mortally wounded, he later managed with the help of the darkness to reach our positions.»"
— Monte Valderoa, 27 October 1918

- Bronze Medal of Military Valor

Commander of an assault platoon inflamed by pure and high ideals, he always demonstrated the greatest contempt for danger in carrying out the numerous and difficult tasks assigned to his unit. In the attack by a strong enemy rear guard, he faced his adversary with impetuous courage, shaking his resistance and capturing 40 enemies, 2 machine guns and a trench cannon."
— Monte Valderoa-Rasai (Val di Seren) 27–31 October 1918

- War Merit Cross (two awards)
- Commemorative Medal for the Italo-Turkish War 1911–1912
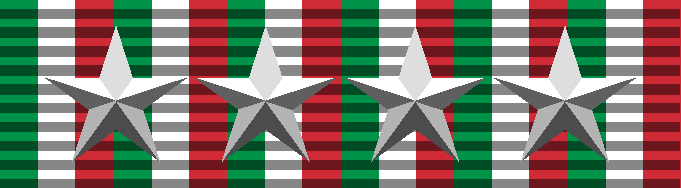
- Commemorative Medal for the Italo-Austrian War 1915–1918 (four years of campaign)
- Commemorative Medal of the Unity of Italy 1848–1918
- Medal of Merit for the Volunteers of the Italo-Austrian War 1915–1918
- Allied Victory Medal
- Commemorative Medal of the March on Rome (Gold)
- Commemorative Medal of the Fiume Expedition
- Commemorative Medal for Military Operations in East Africa
- Commemorative Medal of the Decennial Air Cruise
- Gold Medal of Merit of the Italian Red Cross
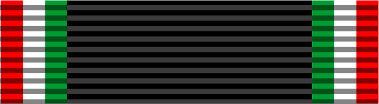
- Cross for Length of Service in the Voluntary Militia for National Security
- Honorary Corporal of the Voluntary Militia for National Security

=== Foreign ===
- Knight Grand Cross of the Order of Pope Pius IX (Holy See, 1 December 1937)
- Bailiff Knight Grand Cross of Honour and Devotion (Sovereign Military Order of Malta, 1939)
- Knight Grand Cross of the Order of the White Lion (Czechoslovakia, 4 May 1933)
- Distinguished Flying Cross (United States)
- Knight Grand Cross of the Order of the German Eagle (Nazi Germany)
- Pilot/Observer Badge (Nazi Germany)

== See also ==
- Aouzou Strip
- Military history of Italy during World War II
- Squadrismo
- Via Balbia

== Notes ==
Awards and achievements
Preceded by Neville Chamberlain	Cover of Time Magazine; 26 June 1933	Succeeded by Hugh S. Johnson
Military offices
Preceded by Pietro Badoglio	Commander-in-Chief of Italian North Africa and Governor-General of Italian Libya; 1 January 1934 to 28 June 1940	Succeeded by Rodolfo Graziani
