= Quadrumvirs =

Four-way power-sharing arrangement

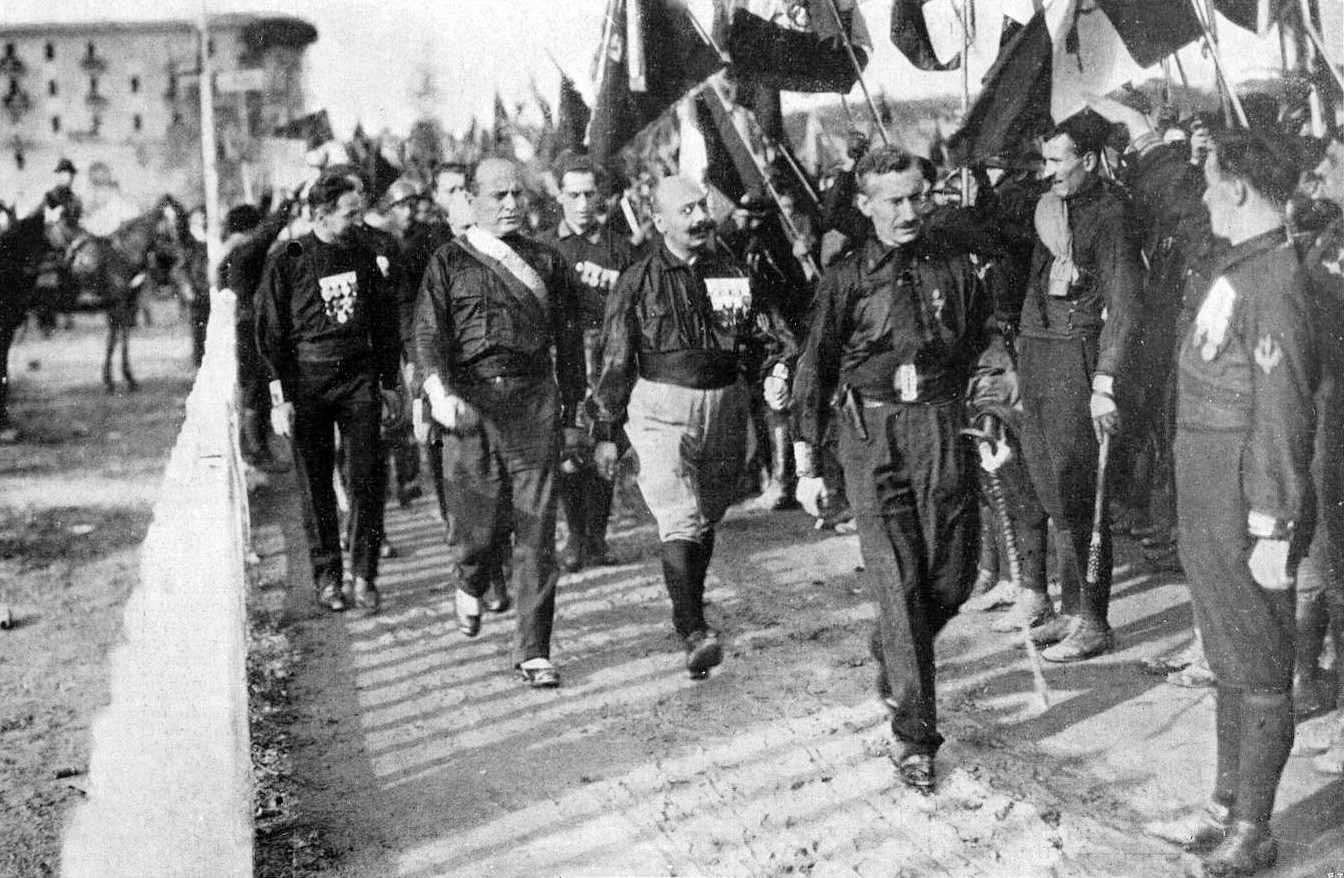
From left to right: Italo Balbo, Benito Mussolini, Cesare Maria De Vecchi, and Michele Bianchi gathered in Naples in 1922

In Fascist Italy, the quadrumvirs (Italian: quadrumviri) were a group of four leaders that led Benito Mussolini's March on Rome. They were all involved in the Fascist party under Mussolini and had been involved in politics and/or war in the period leading up to the Fascist dictatorship. They were:

- Michele Bianchi, a revolutionary syndicalist leader
- Emilio De Bono, a leading Italian general who had fought in World War I
- Cesare Maria De Vecchi, a member of the Italian Chamber of Deputies, as well as a colonial administrator
- Italo Balbo, a Blackshirt leader and leader of the Ferrara Fascist organisation

== See also ==
- Grand Council of Fascism
