= Princess Maria Francesca of Savoy =

Former Italian princess

Maria Francesca
- Princess Louis of Bourbon-Parma
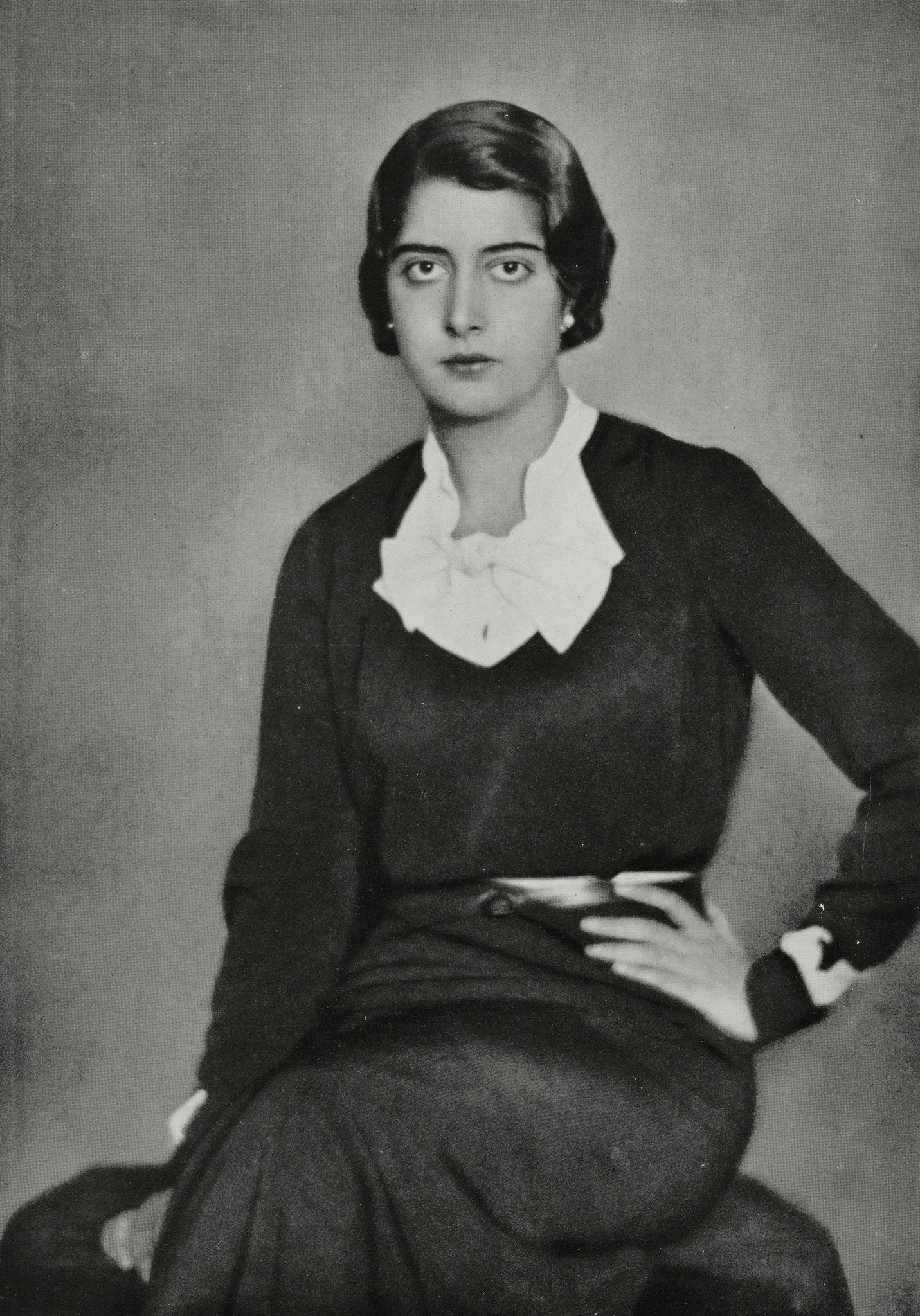
- Maria Francesca in 1937
- Born: 26 December 1914; Rome, Kingdom of Italy
- Died: 4 December 2001 (aged 86); Mandelieu, France
- Spouse: Prince Louis of Bourbon-Parma (m. 1939; died 1967)
- Issue: Prince Guy; Prince Rémy; Princess Chantal; Prince Jean
Names
- Maria Francesca Anna Romana di Savoia
- House: Savoy
- Father: Victor Emmanuel III of Italy
- Mother: Elena of Montenegro

Princess Maria Francesca of Savoy (Maria Francesca Anna Romana; 26 December 1914 – 4 December 2001) was the youngest daughter of Victor Emmanuel III of Italy and Elena of Montenegro. In 1939, she married Prince Luigi of Bourbon-Parma. She was the sister of Umberto II of Italy and Tsaritsa Giovanna of Bulgaria.

== Biography ==
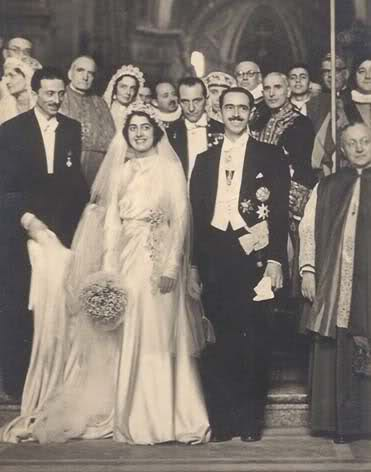
Maria Francesca of Savoy and Luigi di Borbone-Parma at their wedding in 1939.

Born on 26 December 1914, Maria Francesca was born in Rome as the fifth and youngest child of her parents. She had three elder sisters, Yolanda, Giovanna, Mafalda, and a brother, Umberto.

On 23 January 1939, in the Pauline Chapel of the Quirinal Palace in Rome, Maria Francesca married Prince Luigi of Bourbon-Parma (1899–1967), a younger son of Robert I, Duke of Parma, and Infanta Maria Antónia of Portugal. Her husband was a brother of Zita, Empress of Austria, the last Empress of Austria and Queen of Hungary.

The couple moved to Cannes, where all four of their children were born. Maria was interned with her husband and two sons by the Nazis during World War II. In 1945 the Anglo-Americans freed them and they returned to Italy. After the war, they lived in Italy for a while, then returned to France. She took up permanent residence in Mandelieu, near Cannes, after her husband's death in 1967.

They had four children:

- Prince Guy of Bourbon-Parma (7 August 1940, Cannes – 10 March 1991, Paris); married Brigitte Peu-Duvallon on 11 November 1964, divorced on 17 September 1981, with issue.
- Prince Rémy of Bourbon-Parma (born 14 July 1942, Cannes); married firstly Laurence Dufresne d'Arganchy 10 February 1973, divorced 1983, with issue. He married secondly Elisabeth Tardif on 5 July 2003.
- Princess Chantal of Bourbon-Parma (born 24 November 1946, Cannes); married firstly Panayotis Skinas on 1 July 1977, divorced in 1987, with issue. She married secondly Francois-Henri Georges on 24 September 1988.
- Prince Jean of Bourbon-Parma (born 15 October 1961, Cannes); married Virginia Roatta on 26 March 1988, with issue. Jean is the youngest grandchild of Robert I, Duke of Parma.

== Honours ==
- (Kingdom of Italy) House of Savoy: Dame Grand Cross of the Order of Saints Maurice and Lazarus
- Sovereign Military Order of Malta: Dame Grand Cross of Honour and Devotion of the Sovereign Military Order of Malta, 3rd First Class
- (Austria-Hungary) Austrian Imperial and Royal Family: Dame of the Order of the Starry Cross, 2nd Class

== Ancestry ==
Ancestors of Princess Maria Francesca of Savoy

8. Victor Emmanuel II of Italy
4. Umberto I of Italy
9. Archduchess Adelaide of Austria
2. Victor Emmanuel III of Italy
10. Prince Ferdinand, Duke of Genoa
5. Princess Margherita of Savoy
11. Princess Elisabeth of Saxony
1. Princess Maria Francesca of Savoy
12. Mirko Petrović-Njegoš, Grand Duke of Grahovo
6. Nicholas I of Montenegro
13. Anastasija Martinović
3. Princess Elena of Montenegro
14. Duke Petar Vukotić
7. Milena Vukotić
15. Jelena Voivodić
