= Elena of Montenegro =

Queen of Italy from 1900 to 1946

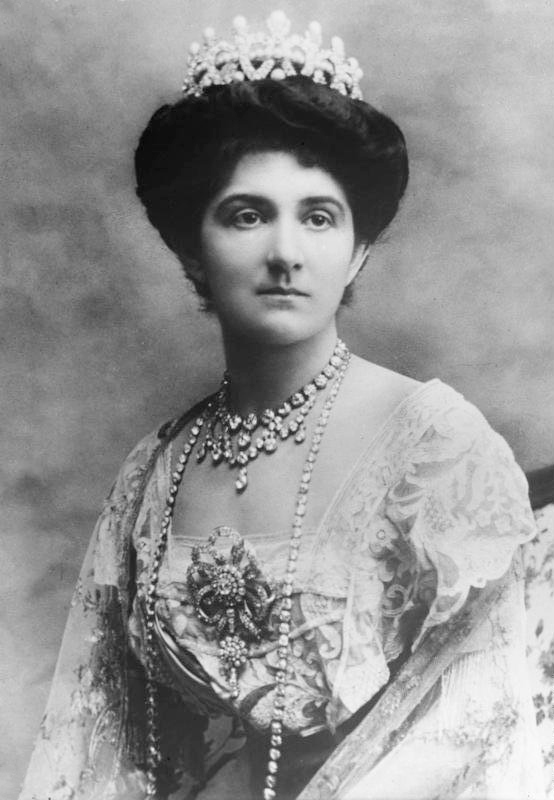
- Queen Elena in 1915

Queen consort of Italy
- Tenure: 29 July 1900 – 9 May 1946

Empress consort of Ethiopia
- Tenure: 9 May 1936 – 5 May 1941

Queen consort of the Albanians
- Tenure: 16 April 1939 – 8 September 1943
- Born: 8 January 1873; Cetinje, Montenegro
- Died: 28 November 1952 (aged 79); Montpellier, France
- Burial: late 1952; Montpellier; 15 December 2017; Sanctuary of Vicoforte
- Spouse: Victor Emmanuel III of Italy (m. 1896; died 1947)
- Issue: Princess Yolanda, Countess of Bergolo; Princess Mafalda, Landgravine of Hesse; Umberto II of Italy; Giovanna, Queen of Bulgaria; Maria Francesca, Princess Louis of Bourbon-Parma
Names
- Jelena Petrović-Njegoš
- House: Petrović-Njegoš
- Father: Nicholas I of Montenegro
- Mother: Milena Vukotić
- Religion: Roman Catholic prev. Eastern Orthodoxy

Elena of Montenegro (Serbian: Јелена Петровић Његош / Jelena Petrović Njegoš; 8 January 1873 – 28 November 1952) was Queen of Italy from 29 July 1900 until 9 May 1946 as the wife of King Victor Emmanuel III. As Victor Emmanuel's wife, she briefly claimed the titles Empress of Ethiopia and Queen of the Albanians; both titles were dropped when her husband formally renounced them in 1943. Elena was the daughter of King Nicholas I and Queen Milena of Montenegro. With the opening of her beatification process in 2001, she was titled Servant of God.

== Biography ==
=== Early life ===
She was born in Cetinje, at the time the capital of the Principality of Montenegro. She was raised in the values and unity of the family; the conversation at the table was conducted in French, and politics and poetry were discussed with equal ease; habits and relationships in the Petrović-Njegoš family did not stifle the spontaneity of characters and personalities.

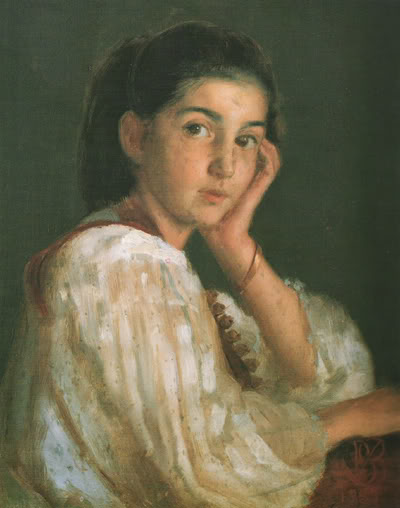
Portrait of young Elena in 1888, by Vlaho Bukovac

She was tutored by the Swiss governess from Hallau, Fräulein Luisa Neukomm (1845–1932), between the ages of six and twelve, and was thereafter educated at the Smolny Institute of Noble Maidens in Saint Petersburg, Russia, until the age of 18. She was interested in pastel painting, hunting and fishing. She also attended the Russian Imperial Court and collaborated with the Russian literary magazine Nedelya by publishing poems.

Elena was described as shy and reserved but also rather stubborn. Very attached to traditions, with a sensitive soul and a lively and curious mind, she was endowed with a strong love for nature: her favorite flower was the cyclamen. She was a tall woman for her time, standing 180 cm (5 feet 11 inches), a notable contrast to her future husband who was 152 cm (5 feet).

=== Engagement ===
In Italy, Queen Margherita worried about the marriage of her only son, the future king, and in agreement with Francesco Crispi, who was of Albanian origin and eager for a greater influence of Italy in the Balkans, they arranged the meeting between the two young people. In April 1895 Elena attended the International Art Exhibition in Venice (at which she was presented to the king and queen of Italy) and the opera – where she was presented to Prince Victor Emmanuel.

After another meeting in Russia, on the occasion of the coronation of Nicholas II of Russia, Victor Emmanuel formulated the official request to Elena's father, Nicholas I. On 18 August 1896, Elena and Victor Emmanuel became engaged during his visit to Cetinje.

=== Marriage ===
Being of Orthodox religion, Elena, for reasons of royal opportunity and to support Queen Margherita, mother of Vittorio Emanuele, left Montenegro. On 21 October 1896, with Vittorio Emanuele, she landed in Bari, where at the basilica of St. Nicola, before the wedding, she converted to Catholicism from Orthodox Christianity, although her father would have preferred the conversion to be proclaimed after the marriage. Her mother was so distressed that Elena had changed her religion, that she refused to come to the wedding ceremony in Rome.

=== Queen ===
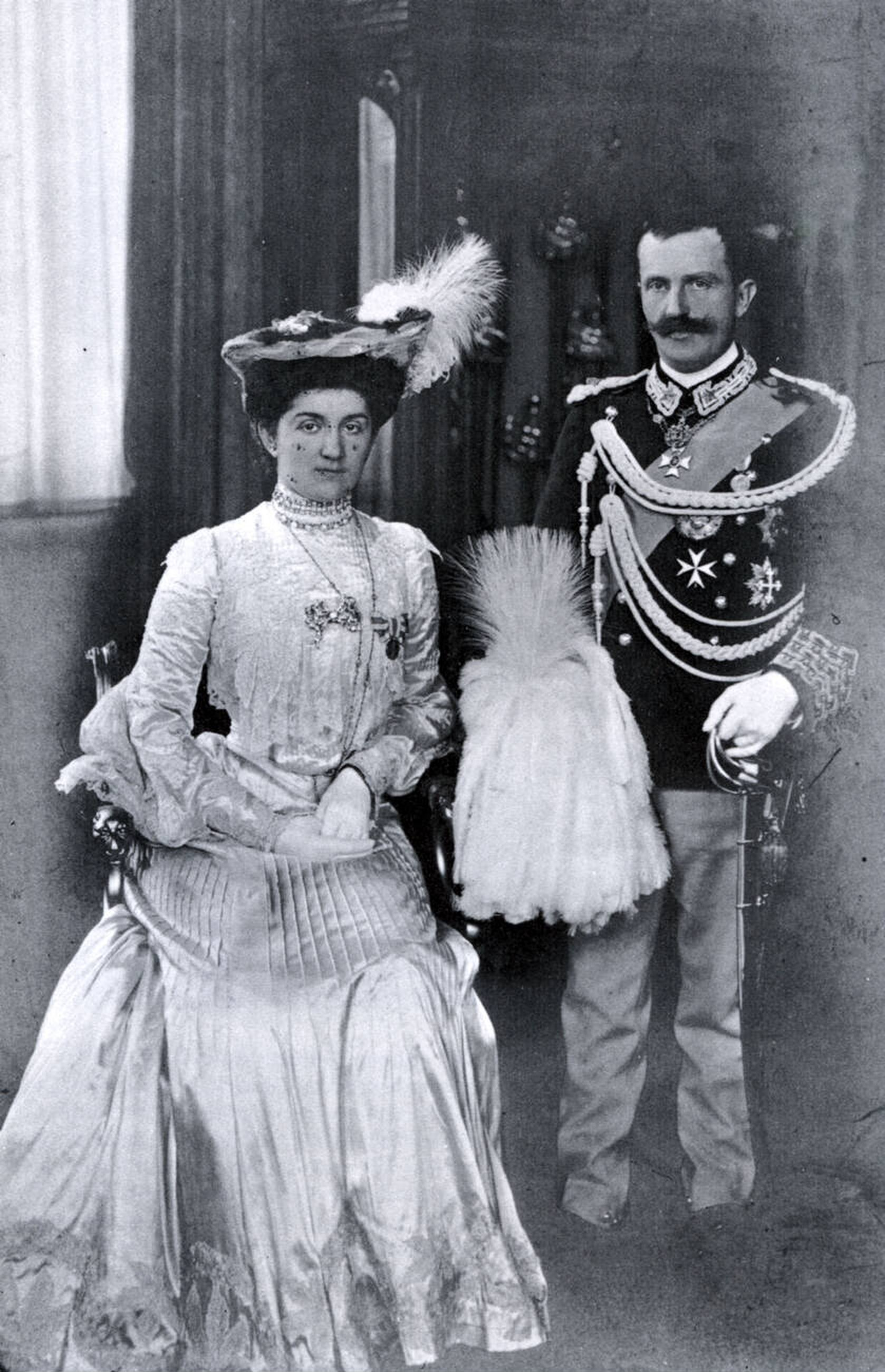
King Victor Emmanuel III and Queen Elena of Italy in 1901

On 29 July 1900, following his father's assassination, Victor Emmanuel ascended the Italian throne. Officially, Elena assumed her husband's whole titles: she became Queen of Italy, and after Mussolini's occupations of Albania and Ethiopia she assumed the titles of Queen of Albania and Empress of Ethiopia.

Elena was described as dignified but natural and simple, and kept the simple habits of her youth in Cetinje. She did not enjoy social life and entertainment or the life of public royal representational duties, but preferred to live a simple, quiet family life. She was described as a loving parent, devoted in giving her children a simple upbringing, designed to prevent them from feeling superior to other children because of their birth.

To her appearance, Queen Elena was described in 1911:

"No Queen in Europe to-day, save the Tsaritsa and Queen Victoria Eugenie, looks more a Queen than Elena. She is stately and tall, with a statuesque poise that anywhere singles her from the throng. Her hair is as black as midnight forest depths, her eyes as luminous as live coals. Her skin is like unto olives, and her hands firm and strong and large. Her shoulders are broad and she holds them squarely. The impression the woman gives is of unusual physical strength. Nor could this well be otherwise in view of her athletic training."

On 28 December 1908 Messina was hit by a disastrous earthquake. Queen Elena helped with the rescuers. She visited the scene, organized for the wounded to be taken to a Hospital ship and assisted personally to their care as nurse; she also organized a fundraiser for the victims in Rome. This helped to increase her popularity within the country.

==== World War I ====
Elena was the first Inspector of the Voluntary Nurses for the Italian Red Cross from 1911 until 1921. She studied medicine and obtained a laurea honoris causa. She financed charitable institutions for people with encephalitis and tuberculosis, former soldiers and poor mothers. She was deeply involved in her fight against disease, and she promoted many efforts for the training of doctors, and for research against poliomyelitis, Parkinson's disease and cancer.

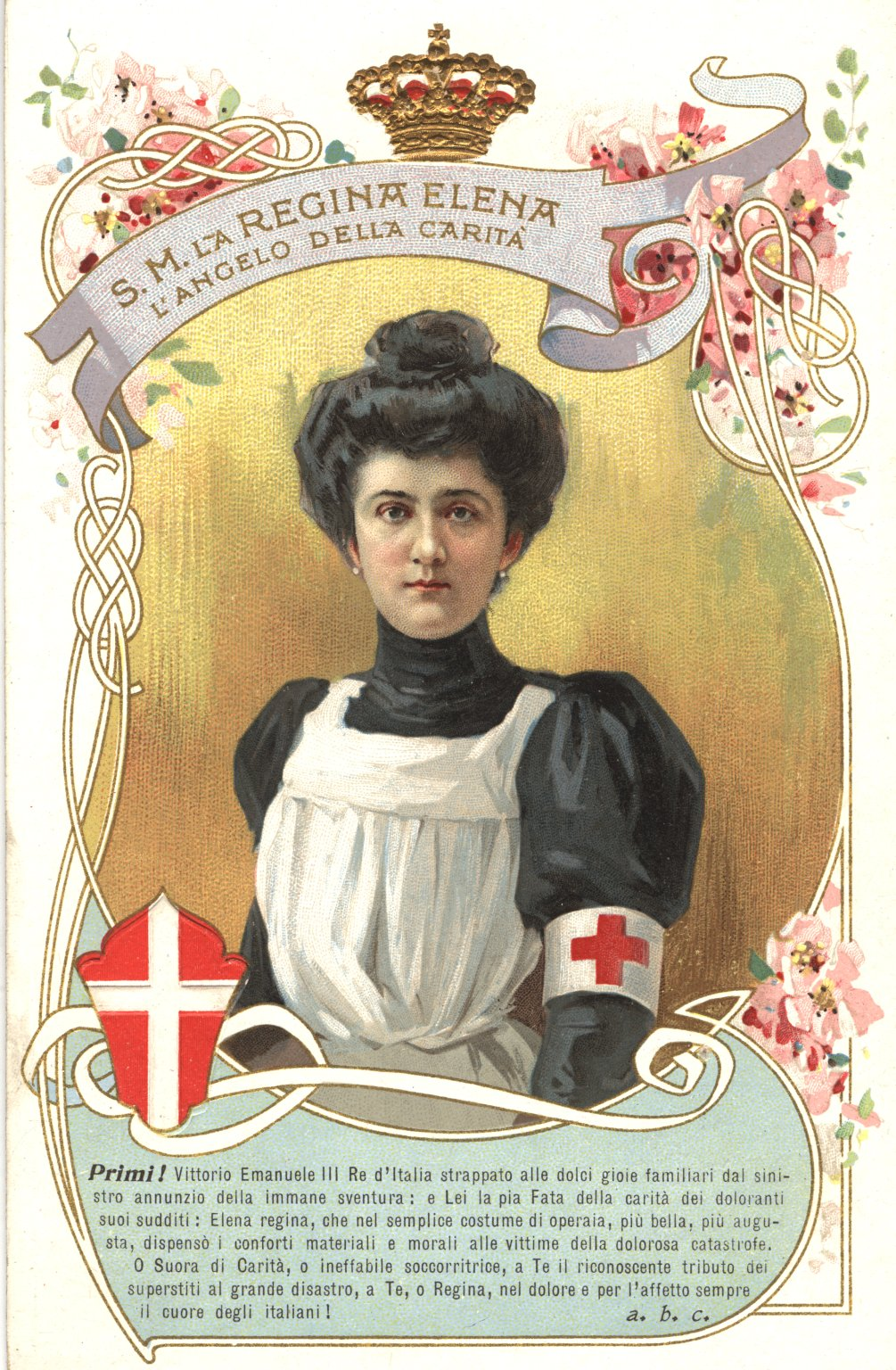
Scan of a widely distributed Italian postcard showing Queen Elena in a nurse's uniform during the First World War

During World War I Elena worked as a nurse and, with the help of the Queen Mother, she turned the Quirinal Palace and Villa Margherita into hospitals, which functioned from July 1915 until 1919. To raise funds, she invented the "signed photograph", which was sold at the charity desks. At the end of the war, she proposed to sell the crown treasures to pay the war debts. In 1920, she founded the Elena di Savoia foundation for scholarships to the orphaned children of former railway workers or soldiers; she suggested that every woman in Italy donated some of her jewelry to the children whose fathers had been sacrificed for the nation, and she started by donating some of her own.

On 15 April 1937 Pope Pius XI gave her the Golden Rose, the most important honour given to a Catholic lady at the time. Pope Pius XII, in a condolence telegram sent to her son Umberto II upon the queen's death, defined her as a "Lady of charitable work".

==== World War II ====
In 1939, three months after the German invasion of Poland and the declaration of war by the United Kingdom and France, Elena wrote a letter to the six European Royals women – two monarchs (Queen Wilhelmina of the Netherlands and Grand Duchess Charlotte of Luxembourg) and four consorts (Queen Alexandrine of Denmark, Queen Elisabeth of Belgium, Maria, Queen Mother of Yugoslavia, and Elena's own daughter, Queen Ioanna of Bulgaria) – whose countries still remained neutral, seeking their support in an effort to prevent the great tragedy that World War II would become.

She influenced her husband to lobby Benito Mussolini, Prime Minister of Italy, for creation of the independent Kingdom of Montenegro in 1941. In 1943 she subsequently obtained the release from a German prison of her nephew, Prince Michael of Montenegro, and his wife, Geneviève. Prince Michael had been imprisoned after refusing to become King of Montenegro under the protection of Italy.

On 25 July 1943 Victor Emmanuel III had Benito Mussolini arrested. The king left Rome on 9 September to flee to Brindisi with the help of the Allies and Elena followed her husband in his escape. In contrast, on 23 September their daughter Mafalda was arrested by the Nazis and sent to Buchenwald concentration camp, where she died in 1944.

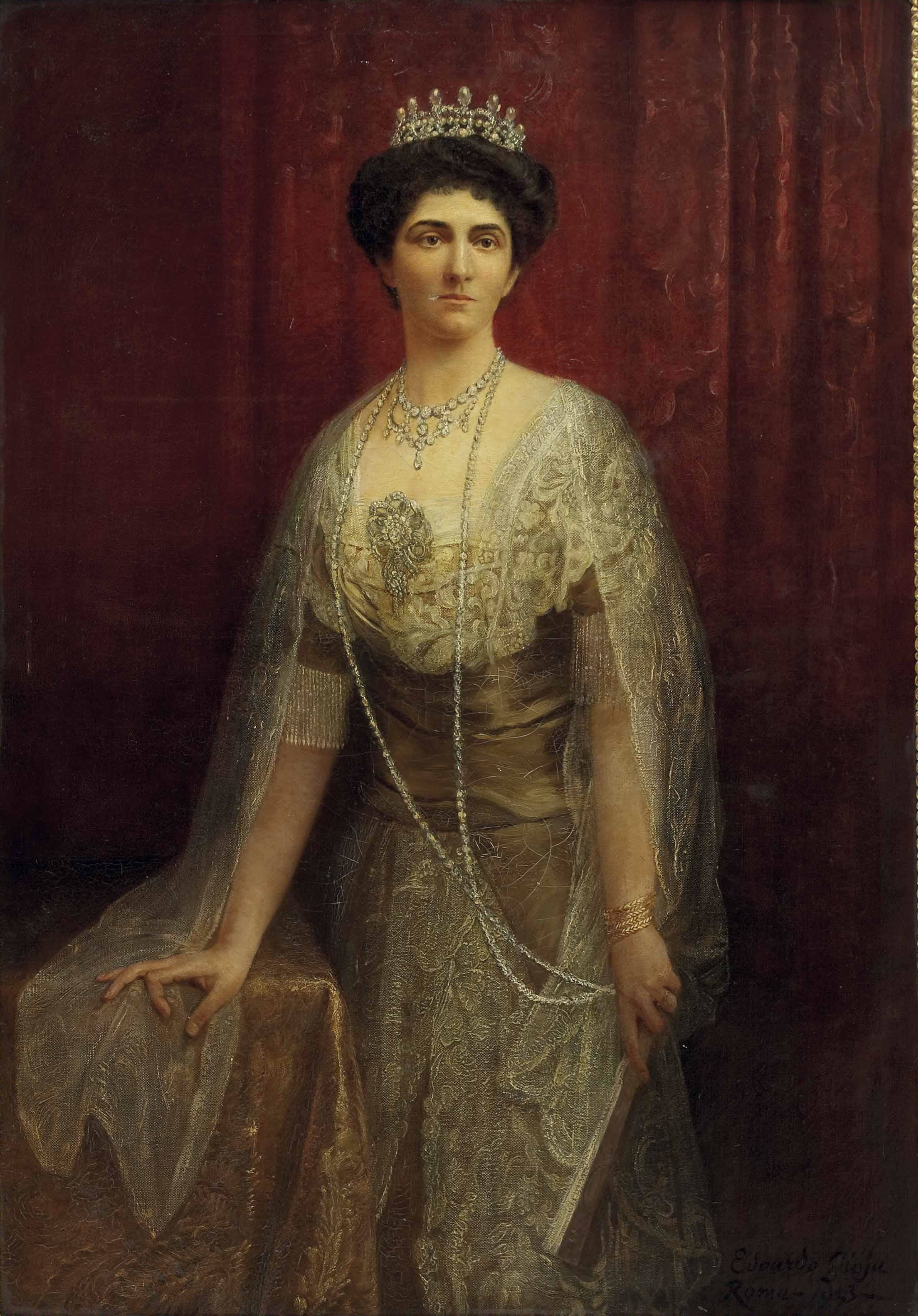
Eduardo Gioja, Elena, Queen of Italy, 1913

=== Exile and death ===
Following the war, on 9 May 1946, Victor Emmanuel III abdicated in favour of their son Umberto, and the former king assumed the title of Count of Pollenzo. On 2 June 1946 a referendum resulted in 54 percent of voters favouring an Italian republic over the monarchy. The republic was formally proclaimed four days later, and the House of Savoy's reign over Italy formally ended on 12 June 1946. Elena and Victor Emmanuel III went to Egypt, where they were welcomed with great honor by King Farouk, but forced to live the rest of their lives in exile. Victor Emmanuel III died a year later of pulmonary congestion in Alexandria. Elena stayed in Egypt a short time before moving to France. There, in Montpellier, she was diagnosed with a severe form of cancer, and died in November 1952 of pulmonary embolism while having surgery to treat it.

65 years after her death, on 15 December 2017, the remains of Elena were repatriated from Montpellier, to the sanctuary of Vicoforte, near Turin. The remains of Victor Emmanuel III were transferred two days later from Alexandria, and interred alongside hers.

== Beatification process ==
In recognition of her great faith and the charitable activities she supported, Pope Pius XI bestowed on her the highest honour at that time for a woman, the Golden Rose of Christianity, twice, in 1930 and 1937. In 2001, on the occasion of the opening of the celebrations for the 50th anniversary of the death of Queen Elena, the bishop of Montpellier opened the diocesan process for her beatification. With the opening of her cause, she has been accorded the title Servant of God.

== Children ==
King Victor Emmanuel III of Italy and Queen Elena had 5 children:

1. Princess Yolanda Margherita Milena Elisabetta Romana Maria of Savoy (1 June 1901 – 16 October 1986), married to Giorgio Carlo Calvi, Count of Bergolo (1888–1978), with issue;
2. Princess Mafalda Maria Elisabetta Anna Romana of Savoy (19 November 1902 – 28 August 1944), married to Prince Philipp of Hesse (1896–1980), with issue;
3. Prince Umberto Nicola Tommaso Giovanni Maria of Savoy, Prince of Piedmont, later Umberto II, King of Italy (15 September 1904 – 18 March 1983) married to Princess Marie José of Belgium (1906–2001), with issue;
4. Princess Giovanna Elisabetta Antonia Romana Maria of Savoy (13 November 1907 – 26 February 2000), married to Boris III, King of Bulgaria (1894–1943), with issue;
5. Princess Maria Francesca Anna Romana of Savoy (26 December 1914 – 4 December 2001), married to Prince Luigi of Bourbon-Parma (1899–1967), with issue.
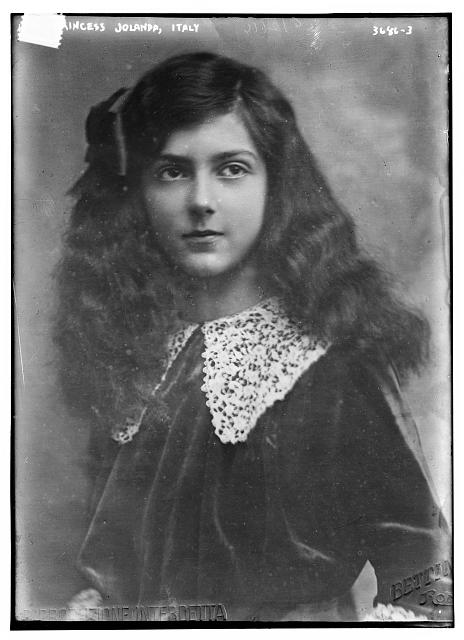
Princess Yolanda

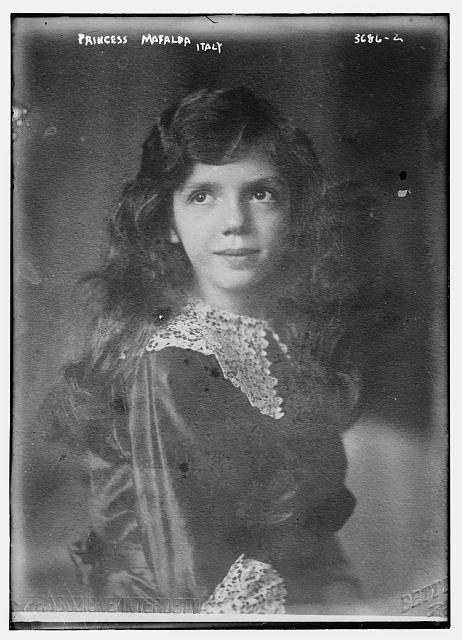
Princess Mafalda

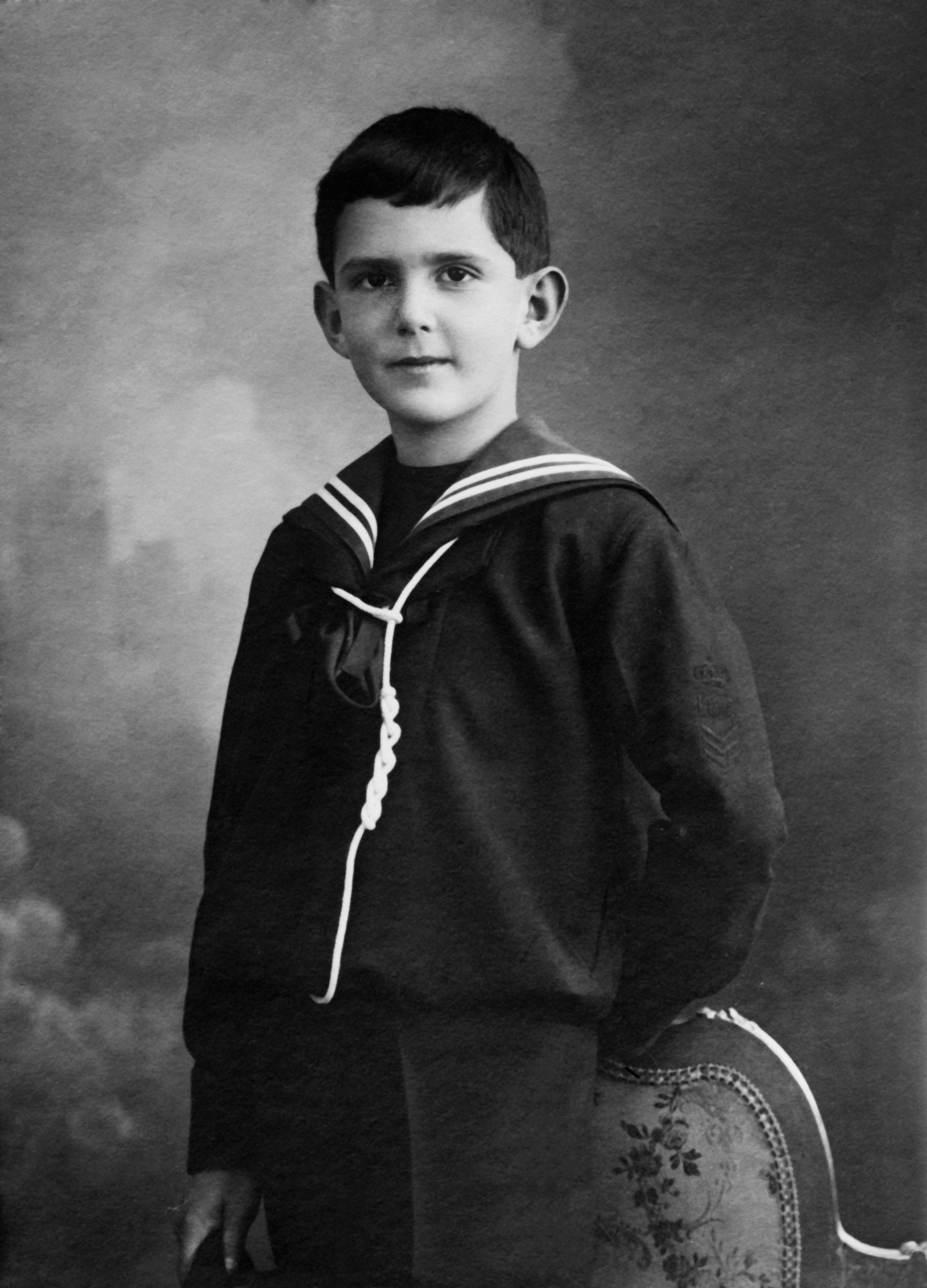
Umberto II of Italy as a child

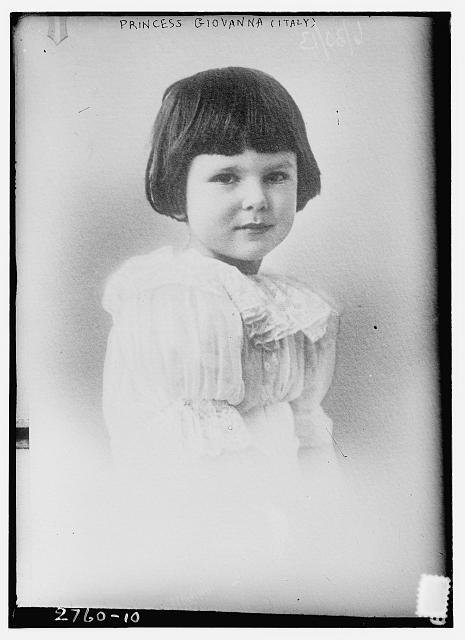
Princess Giovanna

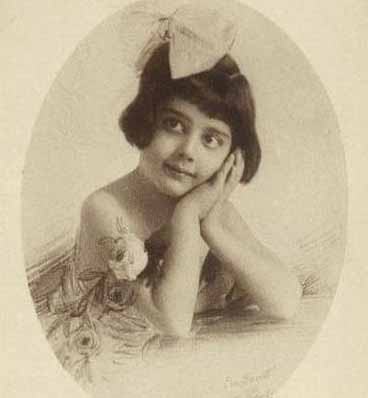
Princess Maria Francesca (17 July 1917)

== Arms and monogram ==
Alliance Coat of Arms of King Victor Emanuel III and Queen Elena

Royal Monogram of Queen Helena of Italy.

Royal Monogram of Queen Helena of Italy.

== Honours ==
=== National ===
- (Kingdom of Montenegro) House of Petrović-Njegoš: Knight Grand Cross of the Order of Prince Danilo I, Special Class
- (Kingdom of Italy) House of Savoy: Knight Grand Cordon of the Royal Order of Saints Maurice and Lazarus

=== Foreign ===
- (Austria-Hungary) Austrian Imperial and Royal Family:
  - Dame Grand Cross of the Imperial and Royal Order of Elizabeth, 1909
  - Dame of the Imperial and Royal Order of the Starry Cross, 1st Class
- (Kingdom of Bavaria) Bavarian Royal Family: Dame Grand Cross of the Royal Order of Theresa
- (Tsardom of Bulgaria (1908–1946)) Bulgarian Royal Family:
  - Dame Grand Cross of the Royal Order of Merit
  - Dame Grand Cross of the Royal Order of St. Alexander, in Diamonds, 1933
- Nazi Germany: Grand Officer of the Order of Social Welfare, Special Class
- Holy See:
  - Knight of the Decoration of Honour
  - Knight Grand Cross of the Order of the Golden Spur
  - Recipient of the Golden Rose (twice)
- Iran: Order of the Sun, 1st Class
- Empire of Japan: Dame Grand Cordon of the Order of the Precious Crown, 11 June 1909
- Sovereign Military Order of Malta: Knight Grand Cross of Justice of the Sovereign Military Order of Malta, 1st Class
- (Restoration (Spain)) Spanish Royal Family: 945th Dame Grand Cross of the Royal Order of Queen Maria Luisa
- (Kingdom of Yugoslavia) Yugoslav Royal Family: Dame Grand Cross of the Royal Order of St. Sava

Elena of Montenegro House of Petrović-Njegoš Born: 8 January 1873 Died: 28 November 1952
Italian royalty
Preceded by Margherita of Savoy	Queen consort of Italy; 29 July 1900 – 9 May 1946	Succeeded by Marie-José of Belgium
Ethiopian royalty
Preceded by Menen Asfaw	Empress consort of Ethiopia (Not internationally recognised); 9 May 1936 – 5 May 1941	Succeeded by Menen Asfaw
Albanian royalty
Preceded by Géraldine Appony de Nagyappony	Queen consort of Albania; 16 April 1939 – 8 September 1943	Title abolished
