= Victor Emmanuel III =

King of Italy from 1900 to 1946

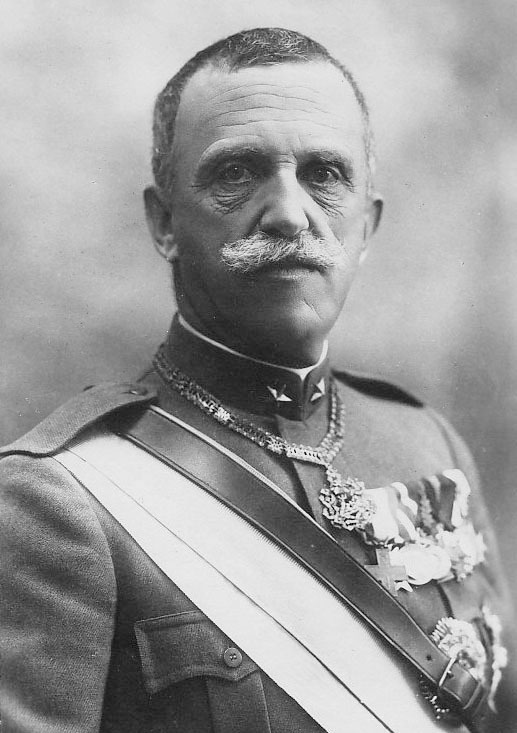
- Formal portrait, 1919

King of Italy
- Reign: 29 July 1900 – 9 May 1946
- Predecessor: Umberto I
- Successor: Umberto II

King-Emperor of Italian East Africa
- Reign: 9 May 1936 – 5 May 1941

King of the Albanians
- Reign: 16 April 1939 – 8 September 1943
- Predecessor: Zog I
- Successor: Monarchy abolished
- Born: 11 November 1869; Naples, Italy
- Died: 28 December 1947 (aged 78); Alexandria, Egypt
- Burial: St. Catherine's Cathedral, Alexandria, Egypt (1947–2017); Sanctuary of Vicoforte, Vicoforte, Italy (since 2017)
- Spouse: Elena of Montenegro (m. 1896)
- Issue: Princess Yolanda, Countess of Bergolo; Princess Mafalda, Landgravine of Hesse; Umberto II of Italy; Giovanna, Queen of Bulgaria; Maria Francesca, Princess Louis of Bourbon-Parma
Names
- Vittorio Emanuele Ferdinando Maria Gennaro di Savoia-Carignano
- House: Savoy
- Father: Umberto I of Italy
- Mother: Margherita of Savoy

Victor Emmanuel III (Italian: Vittorio Emanuele Ferdinando Maria Gennaro di Savoia; 11 November 1869 – 28 December 1947) was King of Italy from 29 July 1900 until his abdication on 9 May 1946. A member of the House of Savoy, he was also King-Emperor of Italian East Africa from 1936 to 1941 following the Second Italo-Ethiopian War and King of the Albanians from 1939 to 1943 following the Italian invasion of Albania. During his reign of nearly 46 years, which began after the assassination of his father Umberto I, the Kingdom of Italy became involved in World War I and in World War II. His reign also encompassed the birth, rise, and fall of the Fascist regime.

The first fourteen years of Victor Emmanuel's reign were dominated by prime minister Giovanni Giolitti, who focused on industrialization and passed several democratic reforms, such as the introduction of universal male suffrage. In foreign policy, Giolitti's Italy distanced itself from the fellow members of the Triple Alliance (the German Empire and Austria-Hungary) and colonized Libya following the Italo-Turkish War. Giolitti was succeeded by Antonio Salandra, Paolo Boselli, and Vittorio Emanuele Orlando. The First World War brought about Italian victory over the Habsburg Empire and the annexation of the Italian-speaking provinces of Trento and Trieste, completing the national unity of Italy, and the southern part of German-speaking Tyrol (South Tyrol). For this reason, Victor Emmanuel was labelled the "King of Victory". However, a part of Italian nationalists protested against the partial violation of the 1915 Treaty of London and what they defined as a "mutilated victory", demanding the annexation of Croatian-speaking territories in Dalmatia and temporarily occupying the town of Fiume without royal assent.

During the early 1920s, several short-serving prime ministers, including the well-respected Giolitti, serving an unprecedented fifth term as prime minister, could not unify the country in the face of the growing Italian fascist movement. Strengthened by the economic downturn facing the country, the National Fascist Party led the March on Rome, and Victor Emmanuel appointed Benito Mussolini as prime minister. He remained silent on the domestic political abuses of Fascist Italy, and he accepted the additional crowns of the Emperor of Ethiopia in 1936 and the King of Albania in 1939 as a result of Italian imperialism under fascism. When the Second World War broke out in 1939, Victor Emmanuel advised Mussolini against entering the war. In June 1940, he relented and granted Mussolini sweeping powers to enter and conduct the war.

After the Allied invasion of Sicily in July 1943, Victor Emmanuel discharged Mussolini and appointed Pietro Badoglio as the new Prime Minister. After weeks of negotiations, the Kingdom of Italy signed the armistice of Cassibile with the Allies in September 1943. During the German reprisal (Operation Achse), Victor Emmanuel III and the government fled to Brindisi, while the Germans established the Italian Social Republic as a puppet state in Northern Italy. Having signed the armistice with the Allies, he then declared war on Germany in October. After the liberation of Rome by Allied forces in June 1944, Victor Emmanuel transferred most of his powers to his son Umberto, effectively ending his involvement in the war and in the government of Italy. Victor Emmanuel officially abdicated his throne in 1946 in favour of his son, who became King Umberto II. Victor Emmanuel hoped to strengthen support for the monarchy against an ultimately successful referendum to abolish it.

After the 1946 Italian institutional referendum established the Republic, Victor Emmanuel went into exile to Alexandria, where he died and was buried the following year in St. Catherine's Cathedral, Alexandria. In 2017, his remains were returned to rest in Italy following an agreement between presidents Sergio Mattarella and Abdel Fattah el-Sisi.

== Early years ==
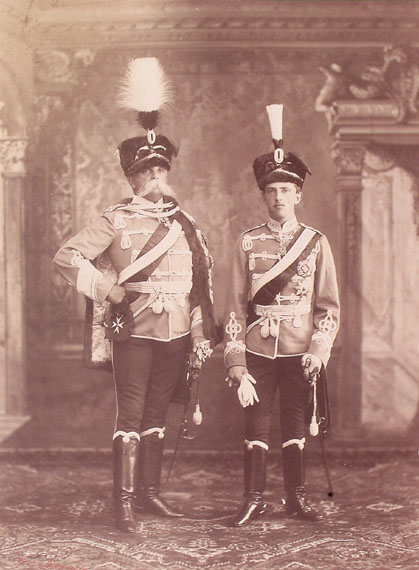
Victor Emmanuel as Prince of Naples with his father King Umberto I, 1893

Victor Emmanuel III was born in Naples in the Kingdom of Italy to King Umberto I and Margherita of Savoy, the Queen consort. He was named after his grandfather, Victor Emmanuel II, King of Sardinia and later King of Italy. Unlike his paternal first cousin's son, the 1.98 m (6 ft 6 in) tall Amedeo, 3rd Duke of Aosta, Victor Emmanuel was short of stature even by 19th-century standards, standing a diminutive 1.52 m (5 ft 0 in) tall, probably due to the consanguinity of his parents (Umberto and Margherita were first cousins, as were his paternal grandparents Vittorio Emanuele II and Adelaide of Austria). From birth until his accession, Victor Emmanuel was known as "The Prince of Naples". On 24 October 1896, he married Princess Elena of Montenegro.

== Reign ==
=== Accession to the throne ===
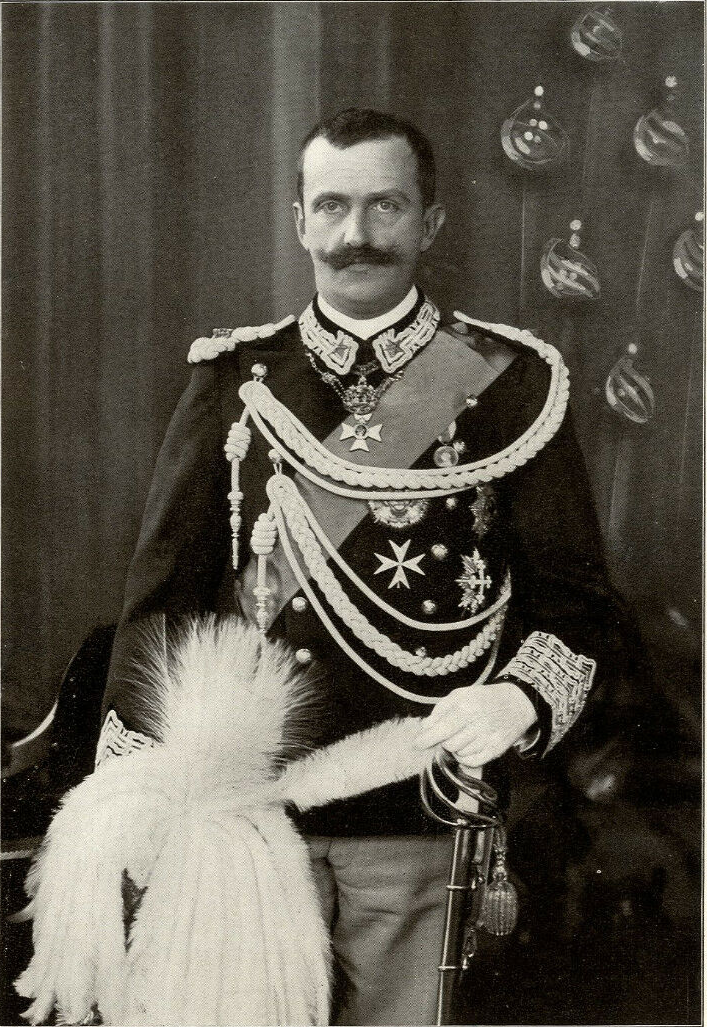
Victor Emmanuel III in 1900

On 29 July 1900, at the age of 30, Victor Emmanuel acceded to the throne upon his father's assassination. The only advice that his father Umberto ever gave his heir was "Remember: to be a king, all you need to know is how to sign your name, read a newspaper, and mount a horse." His early years showed evidence that, by the standards of the Savoy monarchy, he was a man committed to constitutional government. Even though his father was killed by an anarchist, the new king showed a commitment to constitutional freedoms.

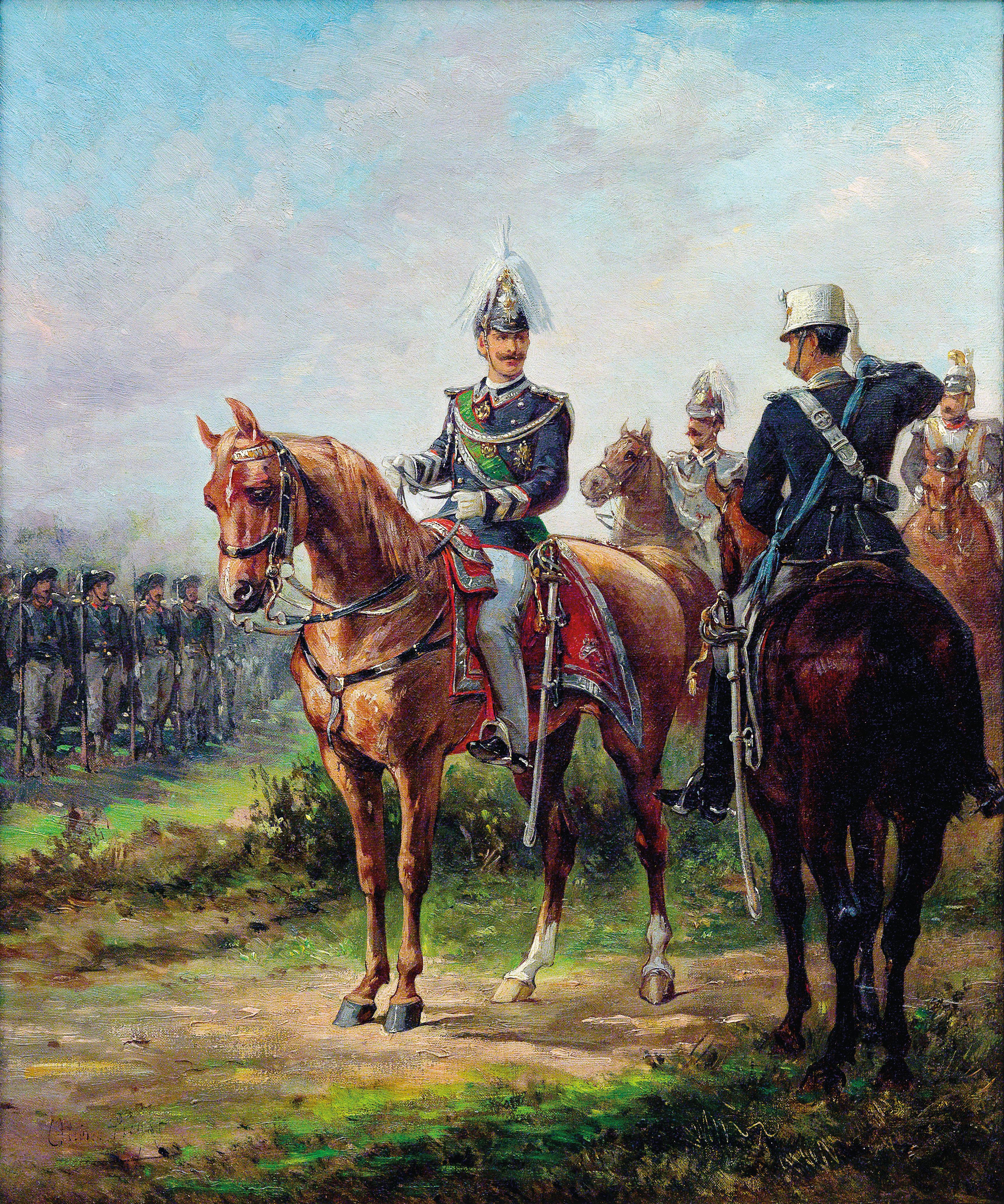
King Victor Emmanuel during a parade

Although parliamentary rule had been firmly established in Italy, the Statuto Albertino, or constitution, granted the king considerable residual powers. For instance, he had the right to appoint the prime minister even if the individual in question did not command majority support in the Chamber of Deputies. A shy and somewhat withdrawn individual, the King hated the day-to-day stresses of Italian politics, though the country's chronic political instability forced him to intervene on no fewer than ten occasions between 1900 and 1922 to solve parliamentary crises.

=== World War I ===
When the First World War began, Italy at first remained neutral, despite being part of the Triple Alliance (albeit it was signed on defensive terms and Italy objected that the Sarajevo assassination did not qualify as aggression). In April 1915, Italy signed the secret Treaty of London committing itself to enter the war on the side of the Triple Entente. Most of the politicians opposed the war, and Italy's Chamber of Deputies forced Prime Minister Antonio Salandra to resign. At this juncture, Victor Emmanuel declined Salandra's resignation and personally made the decision for Italy to enter the war. The king possessed the right to do so under the Statuto, which stipulated that ultimate authority for declaring war rested with the crown.

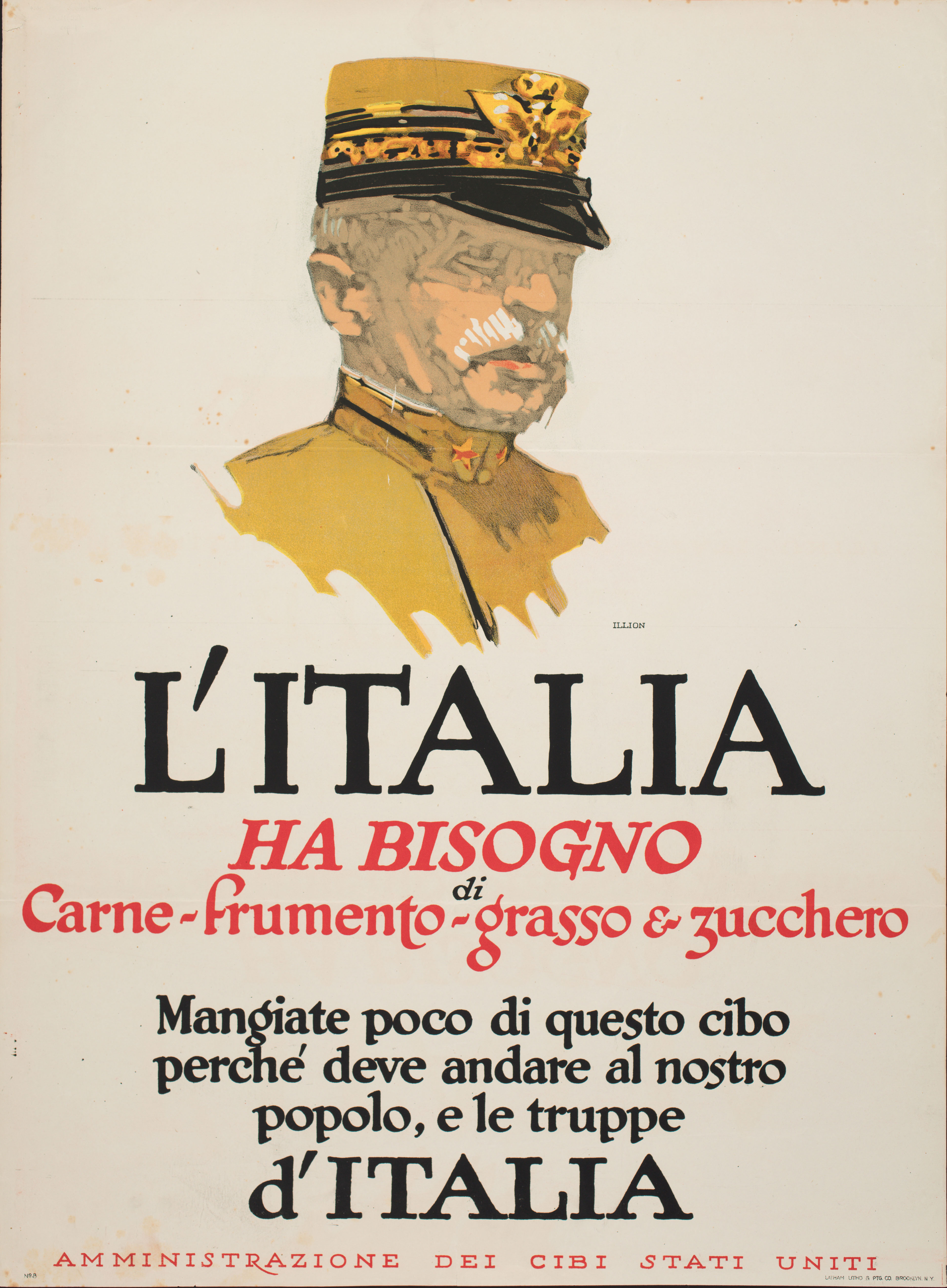
Poster produced during the First World War depicting an illustration of Victor Emmanuel III.

Demonstrations in favour of the war were staged in Rome, with 200,000 gathering on 16 May 1915, in the Piazza del Popolo. The war effort was widely considered corrupt and disorganized, while the unexpected loss of life suffered by the Royal Italian Army, especially at the great defeat of Caporetto, and the post–World War I recession turned the King against what he perceived as an inefficient political bourgeoisie.

Nevertheless, the King visited the various areas of Northern Italy suffering repeated strikes and mortar hits from elements of the fighting there, and demonstrated considerable courage and concern in personally visiting many people, while his wife, the queen, took turns with nurses in caring for Italy's wounded. It was at this time, the period of World War I, that the King enjoyed the genuine affection of the majority of his people. Still, during the war he received about 400 threatening letters from people of every social background, mostly members of the working class. On 8 November 1917, he met with the prime ministers of Britain (Lloyd George) and France (Paul Painlevé) at the Peschiera conference, where he defended Italy's strategic decisions.

=== Support for Mussolini ===
The economic depression which followed World War I gave rise to much extremism among Italy's sorely tried working classes. This caused the country as a whole to become politically unstable. Benito Mussolini, soon to be Italy's Fascist dictator, took advantage of this instability for his rise to power.

==== March on Rome ====
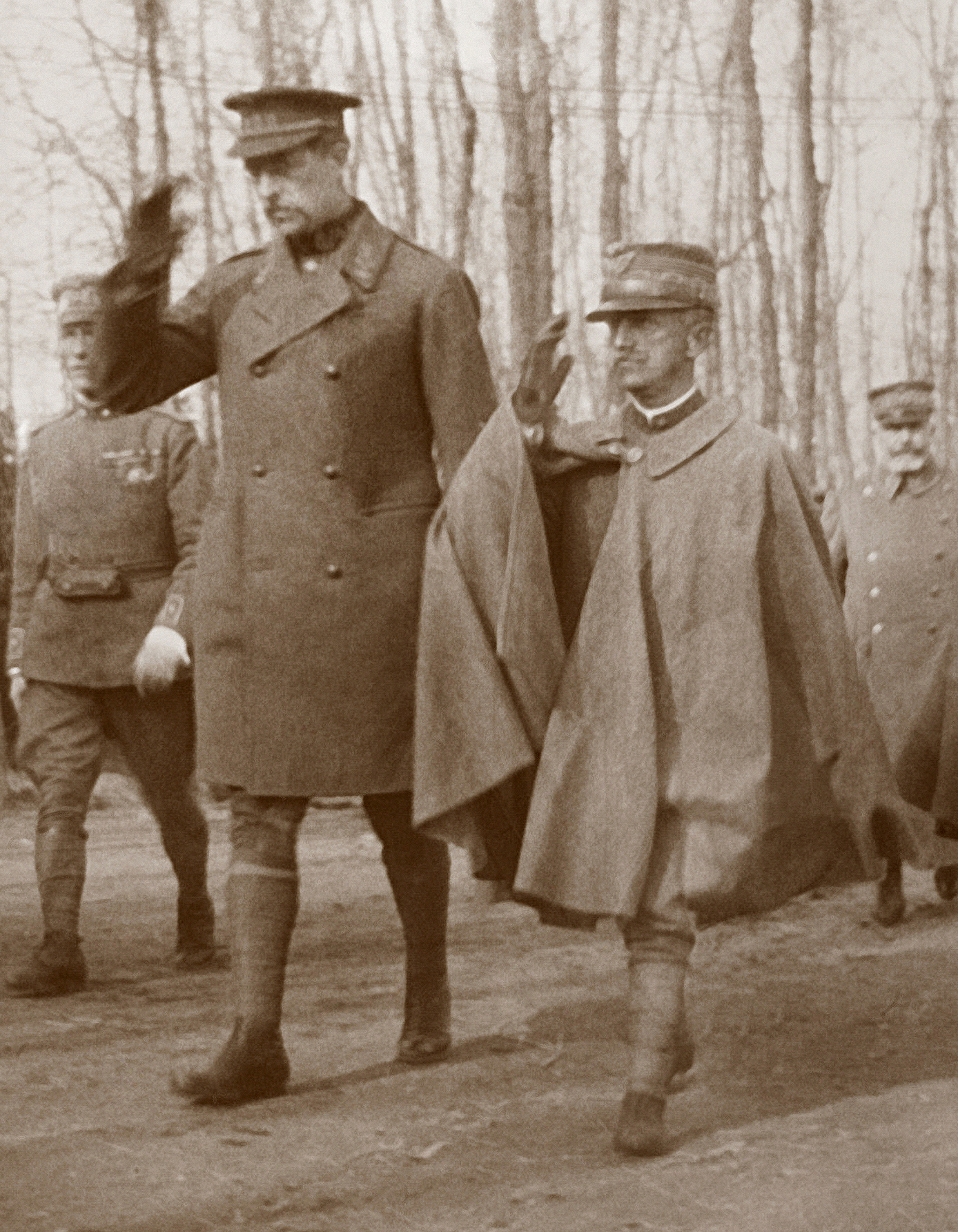
King Victor Emmanuel III (right) with King Albert I of the Belgians (left). This photograph shows Victor Emmanuel's small physical stature.

In 1922, Mussolini led a force of his Fascist supporters on a March on Rome. Prime Minister Luigi Facta and his cabinet drafted a decree of martial law. After some hesitation the King refused to sign it, citing doubts about the ability of the army to contain the uprising without setting off a civil war.

Fascist violence had been growing in intensity throughout the summer and autumn of 1922, climaxing in rumours of a possible coup. On 24 October 1922, during the Fascist Congress in Naples, Mussolini announced that the Fascists would march on Rome to "take by the throat our miserable ruling class". General Pietro Badoglio told the King that the military would be able without difficulty to rout the rebels, who numbered no more than 10,000 men armed mostly with knives and clubs whereas the Regio Esercito had 30,000 soldiers in the Rome area armed with heavy weapons, armoured cars, and machine guns. During the "March on Rome", the Fascist squadristi were halted by 400 lightly armed policemen, as the squadristi had no desire to take on the Italian state.

The troops were loyal to the King; even Cesare Maria De Vecchi, commander of the Blackshirts, and one of the organisers of the March on Rome, told Mussolini that he would not act against the wishes of the monarch. De Vecchi went to the Quirinal Palace to meet the king and assured him that the Fascists would never fight against the king. It was at this point that the Fascist leader considered leaving Italy altogether. But then, minutes before midnight, he received a telegram from the King inviting him to Rome. Facta had the decree for martial law prepared after the cabinet had unanimously endorsed it, and was very surprised when he learned about 9 am on 28 October that the king had refused to sign it. When Facta protested that the king was overruling the entire cabinet, he was told that this was the royal prerogative and the king did not wish to use force against the Fascists. The only politician Victor Emmanuel consulted during the crisis was Antonio Salandra, who advised him to appoint Mussolini prime minister and stated he was willing to serve in a cabinet headed by Mussolini.

By midday on 30 October, Mussolini had been appointed President of the Council of Ministers (Prime Minister), at the age of 39, with no previous experience of office, and with only 32 Fascist deputies in the Chamber. Though the King claimed in his memoirs that it was the fear of a civil war that motivated his actions, it would seem that he received some 'alternative' advice, possibly from the Salandra as well as General Armando Diaz, that it would be better to do a deal with Mussolini.

On 1 November 1922, the king reviewed the squadristi as they marched past the Quirinal Palace giving the fascist salute. Victor Emmanuel took no responsibility for appointing Mussolini prime minister, saying he learned from studying history that events were "much more automatic than a result of individual action and influence". Victor Emmanuel was tired of the recurring crises of parliamentary government and welcomed Mussolini as a "strong man" who imposed "order" on Italy. Mussolini was always very respectful and deferential when he met him in private, which was exactly the behaviour which the king expected of his prime ministers. Many Fascist gerarchi, most notably Italo Balbo, regarded as the number two-man in Fascism, remained republicans, and the king greatly appreciated Mussolini's conversion to monarchism. In private, Mussolini detested Victor Emmanuel as a tedious and tiresomely boring man, whose only interests were military history and his collections of stamps and coins, a man who Mussolini sneered was "too diminutive for an Italy destined to greatness" (a reference to the king's height). However, Mussolini told the other gerarchi that he needed the king's support and that one day, another fascist revolution would take place "without contraceptives".

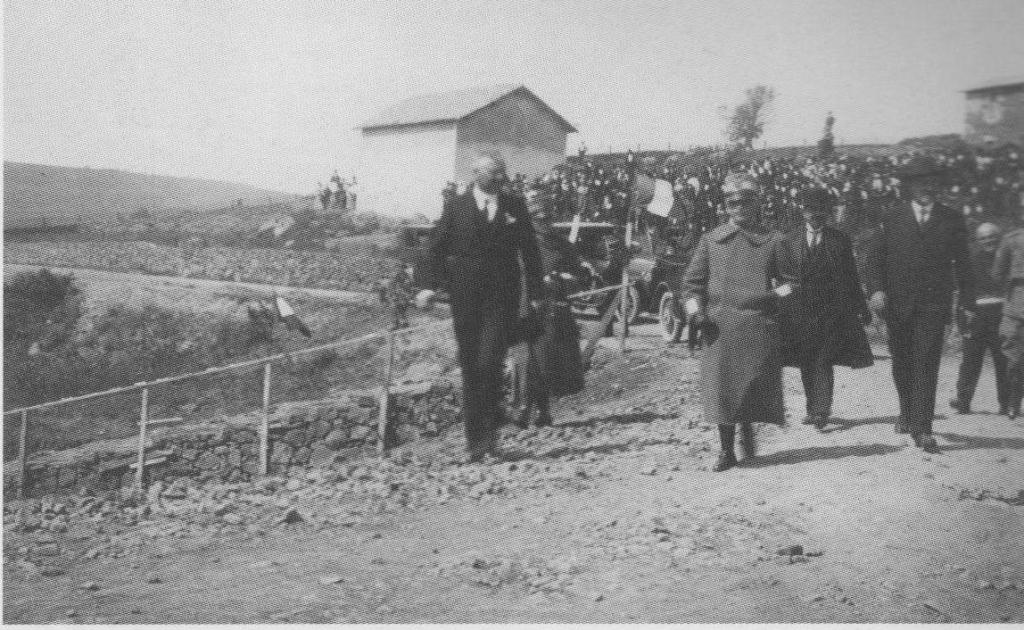
Victor Emmanuel in Darfo Boario Terme after the Gleno Dam disaster, 1923

=== Building of the fascist dictatorship ===
The King failed to move against the Mussolini regime's abuses of power (including, as early as 1924, the assassination of Giacomo Matteotti and other opposition MPs). During the Matteotti affair of 1924, Sir Ronald Graham, the British ambassador, reported: "His Majesty once told me that he had never had a premier with whom he found it so satisfactory to deal as with Signor Mussolini, and I know from private sources that recent events have not changed his opinion". The Matteotti affair did much to turn Italian public opinion against Fascism, and Graham reported to London that "Fascism is more unpopular by the day" while quoting a high Vatican official as saying to him that Fascism was a "spent force". The fact that Matteotti had been tortured by his killers for several hours before he was killed especially shocked Italian public opinion, who were much offended by the gratuitous cruelty of the squadristi killers. Given the widespread public revulsion against Mussolini generated by the murder of Matteotti, the king could have dismissed Mussolini in 1924 with a minimum of trouble and broad public support. Orlando told the king that the majority of the Italian people were tired of the abuses of the squadristi, of which the murder of Matteotti was only the most notorious example, and were hoping that he would dismiss Mussolini, saying that one word from the king would be enough to bring down his unpopular prime minister. The newspaper Corriere della Sera in an editorial stated the abuses of the Fascist government such as the murder of Matteotti had now reached such a point that the king had both a legal and moral duty to dismiss Mussolini at once and restore the rule of law. During the Matteotti affair, even pro-Fascist politicians like Salandra started to express some doubts about Mussolini after he took responsibility for all the Fascist violence, saying he did not order Matteotti's murder, but he did authorise the violence of the squadristi, making him responsible for the murder of Matteotti. The king affirmed that "the Chamber and the Senate were his eyes and ears", desiring a parliamentary initiative, according to the Statuto Albertino. The knowledge that the king and the Parliament would not dismiss the prime minister led to the Mussolini government winning a vote of no confidence in November 1924 in the chamber of deputies by 314 votes to 6 and in the Senate by 206 votes to 54. The deputies and the senators were unwilling to risk their lives by voting for a no-confidence motion as the king had made it clear that he would not dismiss Mussolini even if the motion did carry the votes of the majority.

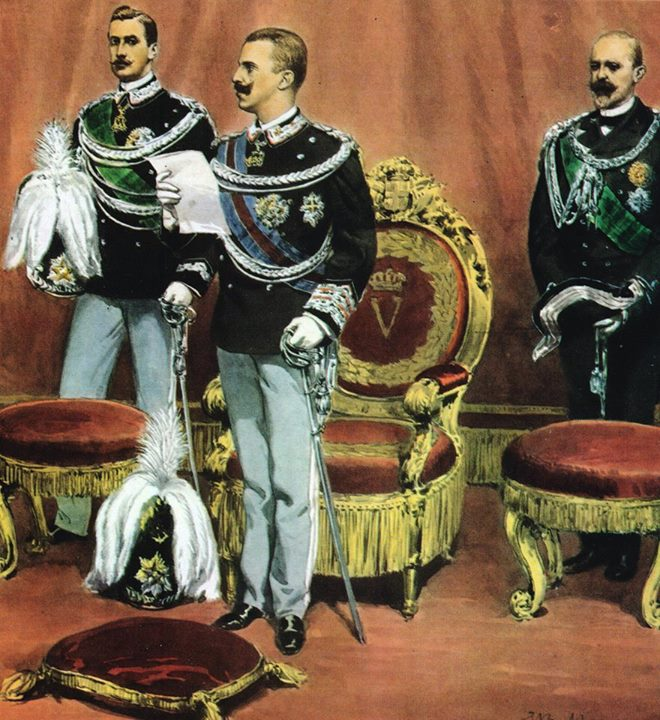
Swearing of King Victor Emmanuel III before the Senate of the Kingdom

Victor Emmanuel remained silent during the winter of 1925–26 when Mussolini dropped all pretence of democracy. During this time, the king signed without protest laws that eliminated freedom of speech and assembly, abolished freedom of the press, and declared the Fascist Party to be the only legal party in Italy. In December 1925, Mussolini passed a law declaring that he was responsible to the King, not Parliament. Under the Statuto Albertino Italian governments were legally answerable to Parliament, but politically answerable to the monarch. However, it had been a strong constitutional convention since at least the 1860s that they were legally and politically answerable to Parliament. In January 1926, the squadristi used violence to prevent opposition MPs from entering Parliament and in November 1926, Mussolini arbitrarily declared that all of the opposition MPs had forfeited their seats, which he handed out to Fascists. Despite this blatant violation of the Statuto Albertino, the king remained passive and silent as usual. In 1926, Mussolini had violated the Statuto Albertino by creating a special judicial tribunal to try political crimes with no possibility of a royal pardon. Even though the right of pardon was part of the royal prerogative, the king gave his assent to the law. However, the king did veto an attempt by Mussolini to change the Italian flag by adding the fasces symbol to stand beside the coat of arms of the House of Savoy on the Italian tricolour. The king considered this proposal to be disrespectful to his family, and refused to sign the law when Mussolini submitted it to him. By 1928, practically the only check on Mussolini's power was the King's prerogative of dismissing him from office. Even then, this prerogative could only be exercised on the advice of the Fascist Grand Council, a body that only Mussolini could convene.

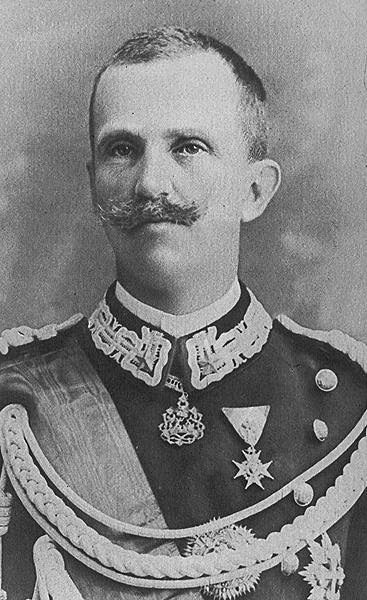
Victor Emmanuel III of Savoy

Whatever the circumstances, Victor Emmanuel showed weakness from a position of strength, with dire future consequences for Italy and fatal consequences for the monarchy itself. Fascism was a force of opposition to left-wing radicalism. This appealed to many people in Italy at the time, and certainly to the King. In many ways, the events from 1922 to 1943 demonstrated that the monarchy and the moneyed class, for different reasons, felt Mussolini and his regime offered an option that, after years of political chaos, was more appealing than what they perceived as the alternative: socialism and anarchism. Both the spectre of the Russian Revolution and the tragedies of World War I played a large part in these political decisions. Victor Emmanuel always saw the Italian Socialists and Communists as his principal enemies, and felt that Mussolini's dictatorship had saved the existing status quo in Italy. Victor Emmanuel always returned the fascist salute when the Blackshirts marched past the Quirinal Palace and he lit votive lamps at public ceremonies to honour the Fascist "martyrs" killed fighting against the Socialists and Communists. At the same time, the Crown became so closely identified with Fascism that by the time Victor Emmanuel was able to shake himself loose from it, it was too late to save the monarchy. In what proved to be a prescient speech, Senator Luigi Albertini called the king a "traitor" to Italy by supporting the Fascist regime and warned that the king would one day regret what he had done.

Victor Emmanuel was disgusted by what he regarded as the superficiality and frivolity of what he called the "so-called elegant society" of Rome, and as such, the king preferred to spend his time out in the countryside where he went hunting, fishing and reading military history books outside. A taciturn man who felt deeply uncomfortable expressing himself in conversation, Victor Emmanuel was content to let Mussolini rule Italy as he regarded Il Duce as a "strong man" who saved him the trouble from meeting various politicians as he had done before 1922.

=== Lateran Treaty ===
Victor Emmanuel was anti-clerical, being greatly embittered by the refusal of the Catholic Church to recognize Rome as the capital of Italy, but he realized that as long as the Catholic Church remained opposed to the Italian state, that many Italians would continue to regard the Italian state as illegitimate and that a treaty with the Vatican was necessary. However, when Orlando attempted to open negotiations with the Vatican in 1919, he was blocked by the king who was furious at the way in which the Catholic Church had maintained pro-Austrian neutrality during World War I. Aside from championing the authenticity of the Shroud of Turin, which belonged to the House of Savoy, the king had little interest in religion. In private Victor Emmanuel regarded the Catholic Church with a jaundiced eye, making remarks about senior clerics as being greedy, cynical and oversexed hypocrites who took advantage of the devout faith of ordinary Italians.

In 1926, the king allowed Mussolini to do what he prevented Orlando from doing in 1919, giving permission to open negotiations with the Vatican to end the "Roman Question". In 1929, Mussolini, on behalf of the King, signed the Lateran Treaty. The treaty was one of the three agreements made that year between the Kingdom of Italy and the Holy See. On 7 June 1929, the Lateran Treaty was ratified and the "Roman Question" was settled.

=== Popular support ===
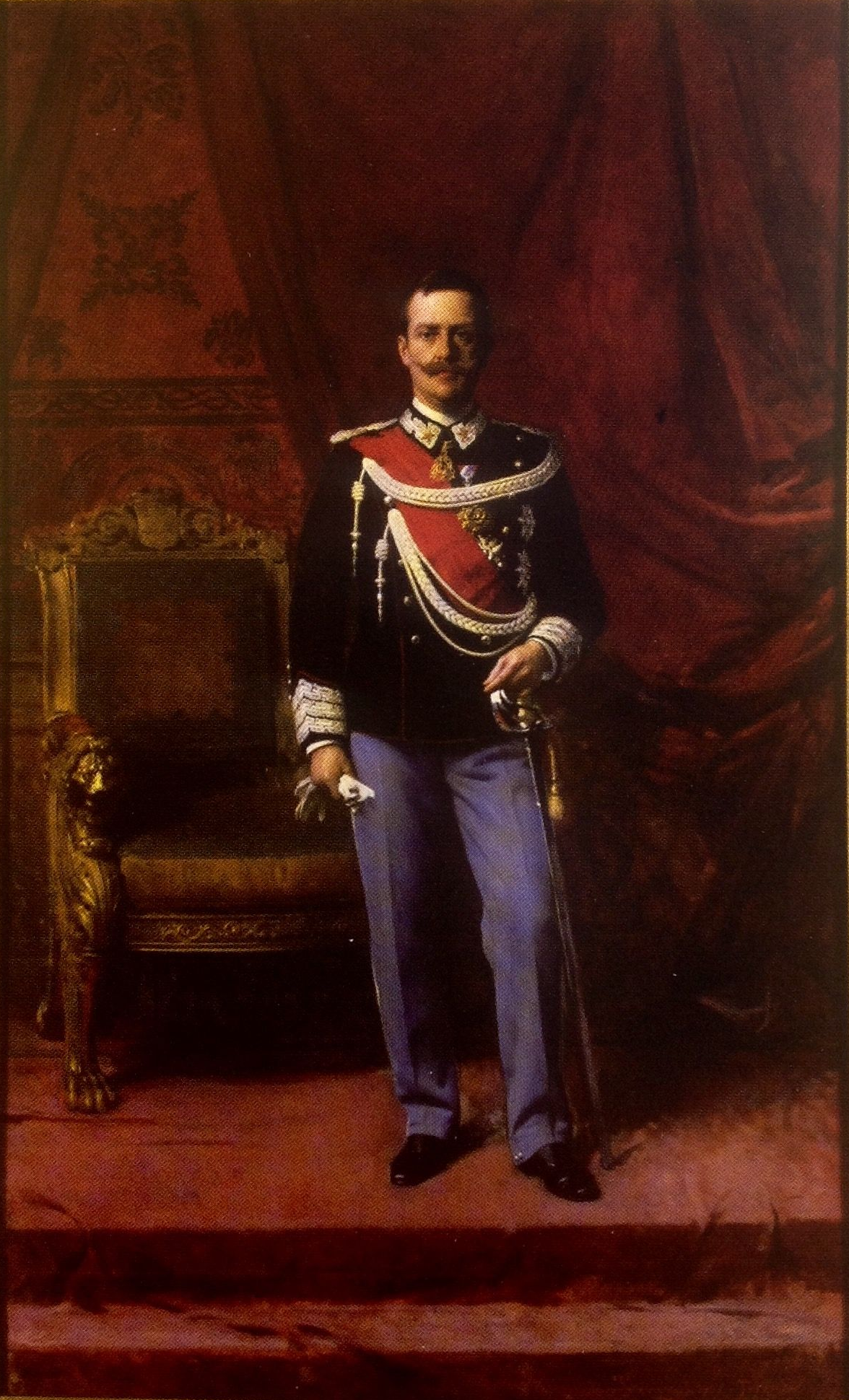
Victor Emmanuel, 1904 portrait.

The Italian monarchy enjoyed popular support for decades.

Foreigners noted how even as late as the 1930s newsreel images of King Victor Emmanuel and Queen Elena evoked applause, sometimes cheering, when played in cinemas, in contrast to the hostile silence shown toward images of Fascist leaders.

On 30 March 1938, the Italian Parliament established the rank of First Marshal of the Empire for Victor Emmanuel and Mussolini. This new rank was the highest rank in the Italian military. However, several of Victor Emmanuel's decisions proved fatal to the monarchy. Among these decisions was his assumption of the crowns of Ethiopia and Albania and his public silence when Mussolini's Fascist government issued German-style racial purity laws.

=== Colonial expansion ===
==== Emperor of Ethiopia ====
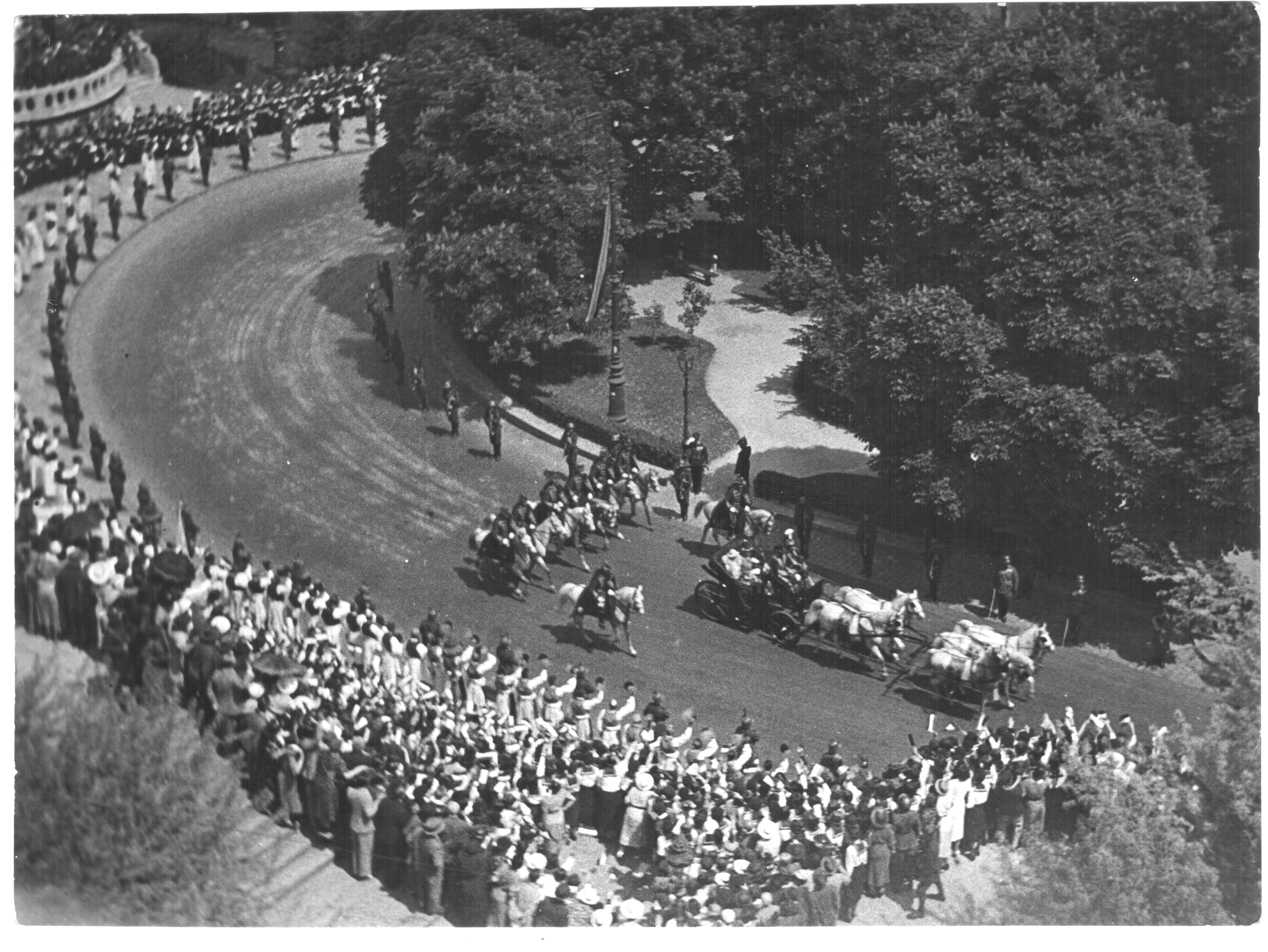
Victor Emmanuel III visiting Hungary in 1937

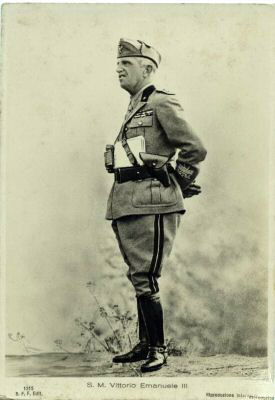
King Victor Emmanuel III in his uniform as Marshal of Italy in 1936

Prior to his government's invasion of Ethiopia, Victor Emmanuel travelled in 1934 to Italian Somaliland, where he celebrated his 65th birthday on 11 November.

In 1935, the Italian Army invaded Ethiopia, an aggression condemned by the League of Nations. Sanctions were imposed against Italy. As a result of the conflict, known as the Second Italo-Abyssinian War, the Italians overthrew Emperor Haile Selassie, who went into exile; Ethiopia (Abyssinia) was annexed into the colony of Italian East Africa and Victor Emmanuel assumed the crown as Emperor of Ethiopia. The League of Nations adopted an ambiguous and weak policy on the issue of Italian East Africa, ending the sanctions against Italy in July 1936, and leaving the matter of recognition to individual countries without taking a strong collective position; by November 1938, 47 countries (at the time the majority of sovereign states) recognized the new Imperial titulature of Victor Emmanuel III. Greate Britain and France were among those.

In 1941, Italy's possession of Ethiopia came to an end, as a British offensive in East Africa resulted in the fall of Italian East Africa and the return of Haile Selassie to the throne. The term of the last acting Viceroy of Italian East Africa, including Eritrea and Italian Somaliland, ended on 27 November 1941 with surrender to the allies. In November 1943 Victor Emmanuel renounced his claims to the title of Emperor of Ethiopia.

==== King of the Albanians ====
The crown of the King of the Albanians had been assumed by Victor Emmanuel in 1939 when Italian forces invaded the nearly defenceless monarchy across the Adriatic Sea and caused King Zog I to flee.

In 1941, while in Tirana, the King escaped an assassination attempt by the 18-year-old Albanian patriot Vasil Laçi. Later, this attempt was cited by Communist Albania as a sign of the general discontent among the oppressed Albanian population. A second attempt by Dimitri Mikhaliov in Albania gave the Italians an excuse to affirm a possible connection with Greece as a result of the monarch's assent to the Greco-Italian War.

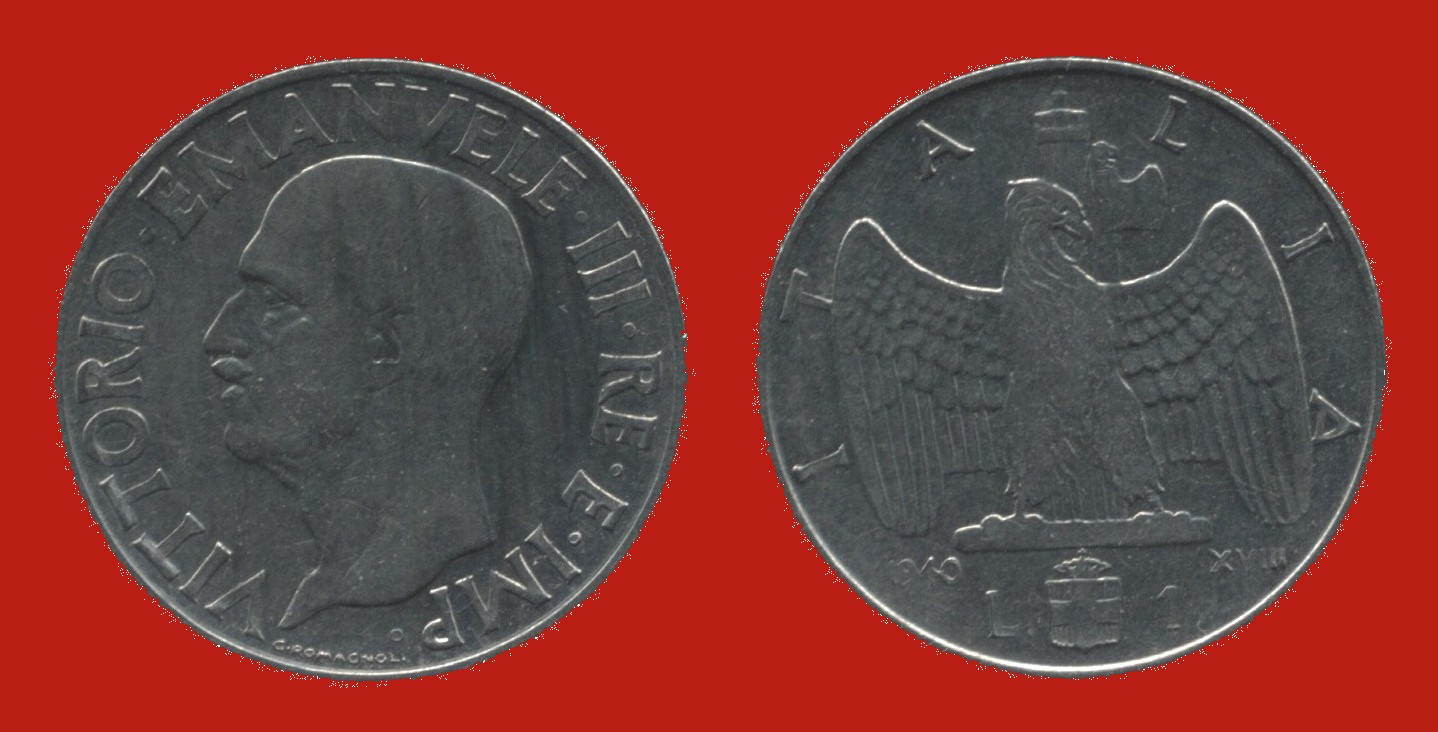
Victor Emmanuel III depicted on a 1 lira coin (1940)

=== World War II ===
==== Pact with Germany ====
Under the terms of the Pact of Steel signed on 22 May 1939, which was an offensive and defensive alliance with Germany, Italy would have been obliged to follow Germany into war in 1939. As the Pact of Steel was signed, the German Foreign Minister, Joachim von Ribbentrop, told Mussolini that there would be no war until 1942 or 1943, but the Italian ambassador in Berlin, Baron Bernardo Attolico, warned Rome that the information he was hearing from sources in the German government suggested that Hitler was intent on seeing the Danzig crisis escalate into war that year. Between 11 and 13 August 1939, the Italian Foreign Minister, Count Galeazzo Ciano, visited Hitler at the Berghof, and learned for the first time that Germany was definitely going to invade Poland later that same summer. Mussolini at first was prepared to follow Germany into war in 1939, but was blocked by Victor Emmanuel. At a meeting with Count Ciano on 24 August 1939, the king stated that "we are absolutely in no condition to wage war"; the state of the Regio Esercito was "pitiful"; and since Italy was not ready for war, it should stay out of the coming conflict, at least until it was clear who was winning. More importantly, Victor Emmanuel stated that as the king of Italy he was the supreme commander-in-chief, and he wanted to be involved in any "supreme decisions", which in effect was claiming a right to veto any decision Mussolini might make about going to war. On 25 August, Ciano wrote in his diary that he informed a "furiously warlike" Mussolini that the king was against Italy going to war in 1939, forcing Il Duce to concede that Italy would have to declare neutrality. Unlike in Germany where officers from 1934 onward took an oath of personal loyalty to Hitler, officers of the Regio Esercito, Regina Marina and the Regia Aeronautica all took their oaths of loyalty to the king, not Mussolini. The vast majority of the Italian officers in all three services saw Victor Emmanuel as opposed to Mussolini as the principal locus of their loyalty, allowing the king to check decisions by Mussolini that he disapproved of.

Italy declared neutrality in September 1939, but Mussolini always made it clear that he wanted to intervene on the side of Germany provided that this would not strain Italy's resources too much (the costs of the wars in Ethiopia and Spain had pushed Italy to the verge of bankruptcy by 1939). On 18 March 1940, Mussolini met Hitler at a summit at the Brenner Pass and promised him that Italy would soon enter the war. Victor Emmanuel had powerful doubts about the wisdom of going to war, and at one point in March 1940 hinted to Ciano that he was considering dismissing Mussolini as Ciano wrote in his diary: "the King feels that it may become necessary for him to intervene at any moment to give things a different direction; he is prepared to do this and to do it quickly". Victor Emmanuel hoped that a vote against Italy entering the war would be registered in the Fascist Grand Council, as he knew that the gerarchi Cesare Maria De Vecchi, Italo Balbo and Emilio De Bono were all anti-war, but he refused to insist upon calling the Grand Council as a precondition for giving his consent to declaring war. On 31 March 1940, Mussolini submitted to Victor Emmanuel a long memorandum arguing that Italy to achieve its long-sought spazio vitale had to enter the war on the Axis side sometime that year. However, the king remained resolutely opposed to Italy entering the war until late May 1940, much to Mussolini's intense frustration. At one point, Mussolini complained to Ciano that there were two men, namely Victor Emmanuel and Pope Pius XII, who were preventing him from doing the things that he wanted to do, leading to state he wanted to "blow" the Crown and Catholic Church "up to the skies".

==== Joining the Axis ====
Victor Emmanuel was a cautious man, and he always consulted all of the available advisors before making a decision, in this case, the senior officers of the armed forces who informed him of Italy's military deficiencies. On 10 May 1940, Germany launched a major offensive into the Low Countries and France, and as the Wehrmacht continued to advance into France, the king's opposition to Italy entering the war started to weaken by the second half of May 1940.

Mussolini argued all through May 1940 that since it was evident that Germany was going to win the war that here was an unparalleled chance for Italy to make major gains at the expense of France and Britain that would allow Italy to become the dominant power in the Mediterranean. On 1 June 1940, Victor Emmanuel finally gave Mussolini his permission for Italy to enter the war, though the king retained the supreme command while only giving Mussolini power over political and military questions. The delay between the king's permission to enter the war and the declaration of war was caused by Mussolini's demand that he have the powers of supreme command, an attempt to take away a royal prerogative that Victor Emmanuel rejected, and was finally settled by the compromise of giving Mussolini operational command powers.

On 10 June 1940, ignoring advice that the country was unprepared, Mussolini made the fatal decision to have Italy enter World War II on the side of Nazi Germany. Almost from the beginning, disaster followed disaster. The first Italian offensive, an invasion of France launched on 17 June 1940, ended in complete failure, and only the fact that France signed an armistice with Germany on 22 June, followed by another armistice with Italy on 24 June allowed Mussolini to present it as a victory. Victor Emmanuel sharply criticized the terms of the Franco-Italian Armistice, saying he wanted Italy to occupy Tunisia, Corsica, and Nice, though the fact the armistice allowed him to proclaim a victory over France was a source of much pleasure to him. In 1940 and 1941, Italian armies in North Africa and in Greece suffered humiliating defeats. Unlike his opposition over going to war with major powers like France and Britain (who might actually defeat Italy), Victor Emmanuel blessed Mussolini's plans to invade Greece in the fall of 1940, saying he expected the Greeks to collapse as soon as Italy invaded. Through the carabinieri (para-military police), Victor Emmanuel was kept well informed of the state of public opinion and from the autumn of 1940 onward received reports that the war together with the Fascist regime were becoming extremely unpopular with the Italian people. When Mussolini made Marshal Pietro Badoglio the scapegoat for the failure of the invasion of Greece and sacked him as Chief of the General Staff in December 1940, Badoglio appealed to the king for help.

Victor Emmanuel refused to help Badoglio, saying that Mussolini would manage the situation just always as he had in the past. In January 1941, the king admitted to his aide-de-camp, General Paolo Puntoni, that war was not going well and the Fascist regime was becoming very unpopular, but he had decided to keep Mussolini on as a prime minister because there was no replacement for him. As the king had supported Fascism, he feared that to overthrow the Fascist system would mean the end of the monarchy as the anti-Fascist parties were all republican.

During the invasion of Yugoslavia in April 1941, Victor Emmanuel moved to a villa owned by the Pirzio Biroli family at Brazzacco in order to be close to the front. In May 1941, Victor Emmanuel gave permission to his unpopular cousin, Prince Aimone, to become King of Croatia under the title Tomislav II, in an attempt to get him out of Rome, but Aimone frustrated this ambition by never going to Croatia to receive his crown.

During a tour of the new provinces that were annexed to Italy from Yugoslavia, Victor Emmanuel commented that Fascist policies towards the Croats and Slovenes were driving them towards rebellion, but chose not to intervene to change the said policies. On 22 June 1941, Germany launched Operation Barbarossa, the invasion of the Soviet Union. Mussolini had the king issue a declaration of war, and sent an Italian expeditionary force to the Eastern Front, although Victor Emmanuel later claimed he wanted only a "token" force to go to the Soviet Union, rather than the 10 divisions that Mussolini actually sent.

In late 1941, Italian East Africa was lost. The loss of Italian East Africa together with the defeats in North Africa and the Balkans caused an immense loss of confidence in Mussolini's ability to lead, and many Fascist gerarchi such as Emilio De Bono and Dino Grandi were hoping by the spring of 1941 that the king might sack him in order to save the Fascist regime. In the summer of 1941, the carabinieri generals told the king that they were prepared to have the carabinieri serve as a strike force for a coup against Mussolini, saying if the war continued, it was bound to cause a revolution that would sweep away both the Fascist regime and the monarchy. Victor Emmanuel rejected this offer, and in September 1941, when Count Ciano told him the war was lost, blasted him for his "defeatism", saying he still believed in Mussolini. On 11 December 1941, Victor Emmanuel rather glibly agreed to Mussolini's request to declare war on the United States.

Failing to anticipate the American "Europe First" strategy, the king believed that the Americans would follow an "Asia First" strategy of focusing all their efforts against Japan in revenge for Pearl Harbor, and that declaring war on the United States was a harmless move. The king was pleased by the news of Japan entering the war, believing that with Britain's Asian colonies in danger that this would force the British to redeploy their forces to Asia and might finally allow for the Axis conquest of Egypt. Marshal Enrico Caviglia wrote in his diary that it was "criminal" the way that Victor Emmanuel refused to act against Mussolini despite the fact that he was clearly mismanaging the war. One Italian journalist remembered that by the fall of 1941 he did not know anyone who felt anything other than "contempt" for the king who was unwilling to disassociate himself from Fascism.

British historian Denis Mack Smith wrote that Victor Emmanuel tended to procrastinate when faced with very difficult choices, and his unwillingness to dismiss Mussolini despite mounting pressure from within the Italian elite was his way of trying to avoid making a decision. Moreover, Victor Emmanuel had considerable respect for Mussolini, who he saw as his most able prime minister, and appeared to dread taking on a man whose intelligence was greater than his own. In a conversation with the papal nuncio, the king explained that he could not sign an armistice because he hated the United States as a democracy whose leaders were accountable to the American people; because Britain was "rotten to the core" and would soon cease to be a great power; and because everything he kept hearing about the massive losses sustained by the Red Army convinced him that Germany would win on the Eastern Front at least. Another excuse used by Victor Emmanuel was that Mussolini was allegedly still popular with the Italian people and that it would offend public opinion if he dismissed Mussolini. The Vatican favoured Italy exiting the war by 1943, but papal diplomats told their American counterparts that the king was "weak, indecisive and excessively devoted to Mussolini".

==== Disillusionment with Mussolini ====
In the summer of 1942, Grandi had a private audience with Victor Emmanuel, where he asked him to dismiss Mussolini and sign an armistice with the Allies before the Fascist regime was destroyed only to be told to "trust your king" and "stop speaking like a mere journalist". Grandi told Ciano that the king must be either "crazy" and/or "senile" as he was utterly passive, refusing to act against Mussolini. In late 1942, Italian Libya was lost. During Operation Anton on 9 November 1942, the unoccupied part of France was occupied by the Axis forces, which allowed Victor Emmanuel to proclaim in a speech at long last Corsica and Nice had been "liberated". Early in 1943, the ten divisions of the "Italian Army in Russia" (Armata Italiana in Russia, or Armir) were crushed in a side-action in the Battle of Stalingrad. By the middle of 1943, the last Italian forces in Tunisia had surrendered and Sicily had been taken by the Allies. Hampered by lack of fuel as well as several serious defeats, the Italian Navy spent most of the war confined to port. As a result, the Mediterranean Sea was not in any real sense Italy's Mare Nostrum. While the Air Force generally did better than the Army or the Navy, it was chronically short of modern aircraft.

=== Efforts to save the monarchy ===
As Italy's fortunes worsened, the popularity of the King suffered. One coffee-house ditty went as follows:

Quando Vittorio era soltanto re
Si bevea del buon caffè.
Poi divenne Imperatore
Se ne sentì solo l'odore.
Oggi che è anche Re d'Albania
Anche l'odore l' han portato via.
E se avremo un'altra vittoria
Ci mancherà anche la cicoria.

When our Victor was plain King,
Coffee was a common thing.
When an Emperor he was made,
Coffee's odour it did fade.
Since he got Albania's throne,
Even the odour has flown.
And if we have another victory
We're also going to lose our chicory.

By early 1943, Mussolini was so psychologically shattered by the successive Italian defeats that he was mumbling incoherently that the war would soon turn around for the Axis powers because it had to. Even Victor Emmanuel was forced to concede that Mussolini had taken a turn "for the worse", which he blamed on "that woman" as he called Mussolini's mistress, Clara Petacci. On 15 May 1943, the king sent Mussolini a letter saying Italy should sign an armistice and exit the war. On 4 June 1943, Grandi saw the king and told him that he had to dismiss Mussolini before the Fascist system was destroyed; when the king rejected that course under the grounds that the Fascist Grand Council would never vote against Mussolini, Grandi assured him that it would, saying the majority of the gerarchi were now against Mussolini. Using the Vatican as an intermediary, Victor Emmanuel contacted the British and American governments in June 1943 to ask if they, the Allies, were willing to see the House of Savoy continue after the war.

On 19 July 1943, Rome was bombed for the first time in the war, further cementing the Italian people's disillusionment with their once-popular King. When the King visited the bombed areas of Rome, he was loudly booed by his subjects who blamed him for the war, which caused Victor Emmanuel to become worried about the possibility of a revolution which might bring in a republic. By this time, plans were being discussed within the Italian elite for replacing Mussolini. Victor Emmanuel stated that he wanted to keep the Fascist system going after dismissing Mussolini, and he was seeking to correct merely some of "its deleterious aspects". The two replacements that were being mooted for Mussolini were Marshal Pietro Badoglio and his rival, Marshal Enrico Caviglia. As Marshal Caviglia was one of the few officers of the Regio Esercito who kept his distance from the Fascist regime, he was unacceptable to Victor Emmanuel who wanted an officer who was committed to upholding Fascism, which led him to choose Badoglio who had loyally served Mussolini and committed all sorts of atrocities in Ethiopia, but who had a grudge against Il Duce for making him the scapegoat for the failed invasion of Greece in 1940. In addition, Badoglio was an opportunist who was well known for his sycophancy towards those in power, which led the king to choose him as Mussolini's successor as he knew that Badoglio would do anything to have power whereas Caviglia had a reputation as a man of principle and honour. The king felt that Badoglio as prime minister would obey any royal orders whereas he was not so certain that Caviglia would do the same. On 15 July 1943, in a secret meeting Victor Emmanuel told Badoglio that he would soon be sworn in as Italy's new prime minister and the king wanted no "ghosts" (i.e. liberal politicians from the pre-fascist era) in his cabinet.

==== Dismissal and arrest of Mussolini ====
On the night of 25 July 1943, the Grand Council of Fascism voted to adopt an Ordine del Giorno (order of the day) proposed by Count Dino Grandi to ask Victor Emmanuel to resume his full constitutional powers under Article 5 of the Statuto. In effect, this was a motion of no confidence in Mussolini. The following afternoon, Mussolini asked for an audience with the king at Villa Savoia. When Mussolini tried to tell Victor Emmanuel about the Grand Council's vote, Victor Emmanuel abruptly cut him off and dismissed him in favour of Badoglio. He then ordered Mussolini's arrest.

Publicly, Victor Emmanuel and Badoglio claimed that Italy would continue the war as a member of the Axis. Privately, they both began negotiating with the Allies for an armistice. The king was advised by his generals to sign an immediate armistice, since German troops in Italy were still outnumbered by Italian troops. But Victor Emmanuel was unwilling to accept the Allied demand for unconditional surrender, and as a result, the secret armistice talks in Lisbon were dragged out over the summer of 1943. Besides rejecting unconditional surrender as "truly monstrous", Victor Emmanuel wanted from the Allies a guarantee that he would keep his throne; a promise that the Italian colonial empire in Libya and the Horn of Africa would be restored; that Italy would keep the part of Yugoslavia that had been annexed by Mussolini; and finally the Allies should promise not to invade the Italian mainland, and instead invade France and the Balkans. Mack Smith wrote that these demands were "unrealistic" and caused much time to be wasted in the Lisbon peace talks as the Allies were willing to concede that Victor Emmanuel could keep his throne and rejected all of his other demands. In the meantime, German forces continued to be rushed into Italy.

==== Armistice with the Allies ====
On 8 September 1943, Victor Emmanuel publicly announced an armistice with the Allies. Confusion reigned as Italian forces were left without orders, and the Germans, who had been expecting this move for some time, quickly disarmed and interned Italian troops and took control in the occupied Balkans, France and the Dodecanese, as well as in Italy itself. Many of the units that did not surrender joined forces with the Allies against the Germans.

Fearing a German advance on Rome, Victor Emmanuel and his government fled south to Brindisi. This choice may have been necessary to protect his safety; indeed, Hitler had planned to arrest him shortly after Mussolini's overthrow. Nonetheless, it still came as a surprise to many observers inside and outside Italy. Unfavourable comparisons were drawn with King George VI and Queen Elizabeth, who refused to leave London during the Blitz, and of Pope Pius XII, who mixed with Rome's crowds and prayed with them after Rome's working-class neighbourhood of Quartiere San Lorenzo had been destroyed by bombing.

Despite the German occupation, Victor Emmanuel III formally declared war against Germany only on 13 October 1943; the matter was a subject of the debate with the Allies and the King initially argued he needed a vote by Parliament first. Ultimately, the Badoglio government in Southern Italy raised the Italian Co-Belligerent Army (Esercito Cobelligerante del Sud), the Italian Co-Belligerent Air Force (Aviazione Cobelligerante Italiana), and the Italian Co-Belligerent Navy (Marina Cobelligerante del Sud). All three forces were loyal to the King. Relations with the Allied Control Commission were very strained as the King remained obsessed with protocol, screaming with fury when General Noel Mason-Macfarlane met him wearing shirt sleeves and shorts, a choice of attire he considered very disrespectful. Victor Emmanuel was ultra-critical of the slow progress made by the American 5th Army and the British 8th Army as the Allies fought their way up the Italian peninsula, saying he wanted to return to Rome as soon as possible. Likewise, Victor Emmanuel refused to renounce the usurped Ethiopian and Albanian crowns in favour of the legitimate monarchs of those states, claiming that the Fascist-dominated Parliament had given him these titles and he could only renounce them if parliament voted on the matter.

On 12 September, the Germans launched Operation Eiche and rescued Mussolini from captivity. In a short time, he established a new Fascist state in northern Italy, the Italian Social Republic (Repubblica Sociale Italiana). This was nothing more than a German-dominated puppet state, but it did compete for the allegiance of the Italian people with Badoglio's government in the south.

By this time, it was apparent that Victor Emmanuel was irrevocably tainted by his earlier support of the Fascist regime. At a 10 April meeting, under pressure from ACC officials Robert Murphy and Harold Macmillan, Victor Emmanuel transferred most of his constitutional powers to his son, Crown Prince Umberto. Privately, Victor Emmanuel told General Mason-MacFarlane that by forcing him to give power to Umberto, the Allies were effectively giving power to the Communists.

By this time, however, events had moved beyond Victor Emmanuel's ability to control. After Rome was liberated on 4 June, he turned over his remaining powers to Umberto and named him Lieutenant General of the Realm, while nominally retaining the title of king.

== Post war and fall of the monarchy ==
=== Abdication ===
Within a year of the war's end, public opinion forced a referendum on whether to retain the monarchy or become a republic. In hopes of helping the monarchist cause, Victor Emmanuel formally abdicated in favor of his son, who ascended to the throne as Umberto II on 9 May 1946.

=== Abolition of the monarchy ===
This move failed. In the referendum held a month later, 54 per cent of voters favoured a republic, and the Kingdom of Italy was no more. Some historians such as Sir Charles Petrie have speculated that the result might have been different if Victor Emmanuel had abdicated in favour of Umberto shortly after the Allied invasion of Sicily in 1943, or at the latest had abdicated outright in 1944 rather than simply transferring his powers to his son. Umberto had been widely praised for his performance as de facto head of state beginning in 1944, and his relative popularity might have saved the monarchy. The Italian conductor Arturo Toscanini declared that he would not come back to Italy as a subject of the "degenerate king" and more generally as long as the house of Savoy was ruling; Benedetto Croce had previously stated in 1944 that "as long as the present king remains head of state, we feel that Fascism has not ended, ...that it will be reborn, more or less disguised."

=== Exile and death ===
In any event, once the referendum's result was certified, Victor Emmanuel and all other male members of the House of Savoy were required to leave the country. Taking refuge in Egypt, where he was welcomed with great honour by King Farouk, Victor Emmanuel died in Alexandria a year later, of pulmonary congestion. He was interred behind the altar of St Catherine's Cathedral. He was the last surviving grandchild of Victor Emmanuel II of Italy. In January 1948, Time magazine published an article about "The Little King".

== Legacy ==
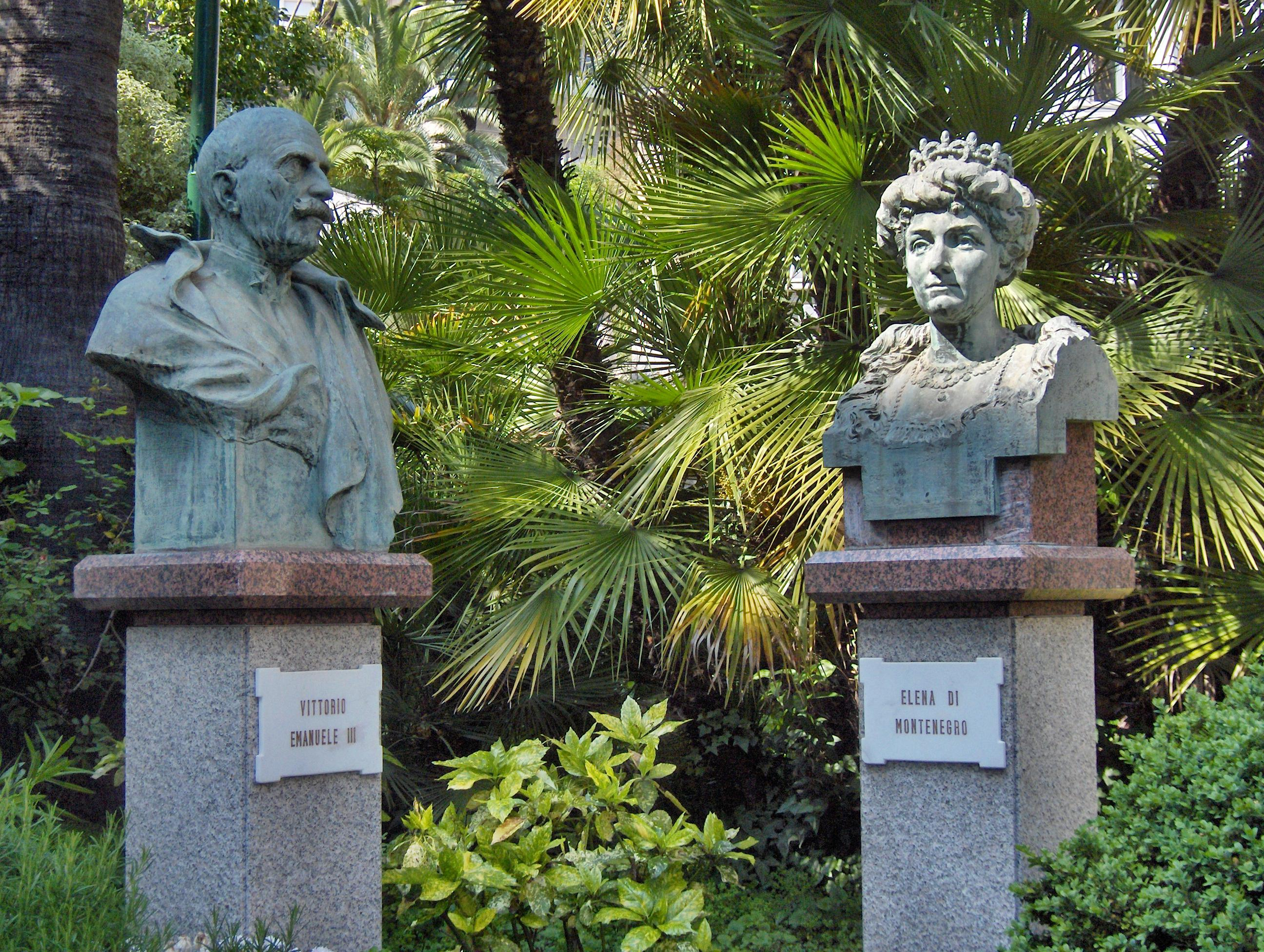
Busts of King Victor Emmanuel III and Queen Elena; forecourt of the Russian Orthodox Church of Christ the Saviour, St. Catherine and St. Seraph, Sanremo, Italy

The abdication prior to the referendum probably brought back to the minds of undecided voters the monarchy's role during the Fascist period and the King's own actions (or lack of them), at the very moment monarchists hoped voters would focus on the positive impression created by Umberto and his wife, Maria José, over the previous two years. The "May" King and Queen, Umberto and Maria José, in Umberto's brief, month-long reign, were unable to shift the burden of recent history and opinion.

Victor Emmanuel III was one of the most prolific coin collectors of all time, having amassed approximately 100,000 specimens dating from the fall of the Roman Empire up to the Unification of Italy and in 1897 becoming honorary president of the new Italian Numismatic Society, of which he was a founding member. On his abdication, the collection was donated to the Italian people, except for the coins of the House of Savoy which he took with him to Egypt. On the death of Umberto II in 1983, the Savoy coins joined the rest of the collection in the National Museum of Rome.

Between 1910 and 1943, Victor Emmanuel wrote the 20-volume Corpus Nummorum Italicorum, which catalogued each specimen in his collection. He was awarded the medal of the Royal Numismatic Society in 1904.

After World War I, Avenue Victor-Emmanuel III in Paris was named after him in honour of Italy's alliance in that war, but the king's support of the Axis Powers led the road to be renamed Franklin D. Roosevelt Avenue in 1946 following the end of World War II.

In Florestano Vancini's film The Assassination of Matteotti (1973), Victor Emmanuel is played by Giulio Girola. In the television series Mussolini: Son of the Century (2024), he is played by Vincenzo Nemolato.

== Honours ==
Monogram

=== National orders and decorations ===
- Kingdom of Italy:
  - Knight of the Annunciation, 1 January 1887; Sovereign, 29 July 1900
  - Grand Cross of Saints Maurice and Lazarus, 1 January 1887; Sovereign, 29 July 1900
  - Grand Cross of the Crown of Italy, 1 January 1887; Sovereign, 29 July 1900
  - Sovereign of the Military Order of Savoy
  - Sovereign of the Civil Order of Savoy
  - Sovereign of the Colonial Order of the Star of Italy
  - Founder and Sovereign of the Order of the Roman Eagle, 14 March 1942
  - Mauritian Medal for Military Merit of 10 Lustrums
  - War Merit Cross
  - Commemorative Medal for the Italo-Austrian War 1915–1918
  - Commemorative Medal of Campaigns of Independence Wars
  - Commemorative Medal of the Unity of Italy
- Italian Albania:
  - Sovereign of the Order of Besa, 1939–1943
  - Sovereign of the Order of Skanderbeg, 1939–1943
- Sovereign Military Order of Malta: Bailiff Grand Cross of Honour and Devotion, 10 February 1891

=== Foreign orders and decorations ===
- Austria-Hungary: Grand Cross of the Royal Hungarian Order of St. Stephen, 1887
- Kingdom of Bulgaria: Knight of Saints Cyril and Methodius, with Collar
- Croatia: Grand Order of the Crown of King Zvonimir, 6 April 1942
- Czechoslovakia: Collar of the White Lion, 1925
- Denmark: Knight of the Elephant, 23 September 1891
- Estonia: Cross of Liberty, Grade III Class I, 29 April 1925
- Finland: Collar of the White Rose, 1920
- German Empire:
  - Grand Commander's Cross of the Royal House Order of Hohenzollern, 10 June 1890
  - Knight of the Black Eagle, with Collar
  - Baden:
    - Knight of the House Order of Fidelity, 1893
    - Knight of the Order of Berthold the First, 1893
  - Kingdom of Bavaria: Knight of St. Hubert, 1883
  - Saxe-Weimar-Eisenach: Grand Cross of the White Falcon, 1888
  - Kingdom of Saxony: Knight of the Rue Crown, 1893
  - Württemberg: Grand Cross of the Württemberg Crown, 1882
- Empire of Japan: Collar of the Order of the Chrysanthemum, 16 April 1902
- Latvia: Grand Cross of the Order of Lāčplēsis
- Kingdom of Montenegro: Knight of St. Peter of Cetinje
- Monaco: Grand Cross of St. Charles, 30 December 1890
- Persian Empire: Order of the Lion and the Sun, 1st Class, 1902
- Poland:
  - Knight of the White Eagle
  - Grand Cross of the Virtuti Militari, 12 December 1923
- Portugal:
  - Kingdom of Portugal: Grand Cross of the Tower and Sword
  - Portuguese Republic: Grand Cross of the Sash of the Three Orders, 19 July 1919
- Kingdom of Romania: Grand Cross of the Order of Carol I, with Collar, 1906
- Russian Empire: Knight of St. Andrew
- San Marino: Grand Cross of the Order of San Marino, 11 April 1889
- Siam: Knight of the Order of the Royal House of Chakri, 1 June 1897
- Spain:
  - Kingdom of Spain:
    - Knight of the Golden Fleece, 2 December 1878
    - Grand Cross of the Order of Charles III, with Collar, 10 December 1900
  - Francoist Spain: Collar of the Imperial Order of the Yoke and Arrows, 1 October 1937
- Sweden-Norway:
  - Knight of the Seraphim, with Collar, 15 April 1888
  - Grand Cross of St. Olav, 19 September 1891
- United Kingdom of Great Britain and Ireland:
  - Stranger Knight Companion of the Garter, 3 August 1891 (expelled in 1941)
  - Recipient of the Royal Victorian Chain, 18 November 1903 (expelled in 1941)
  - Honorary Grand Cross of the Bath (military), 1916 (expelled in 1941)
- Vatican City:
  - Holy See: Knight of the Supreme Order of Christ, 2 January 1932

== Family ==
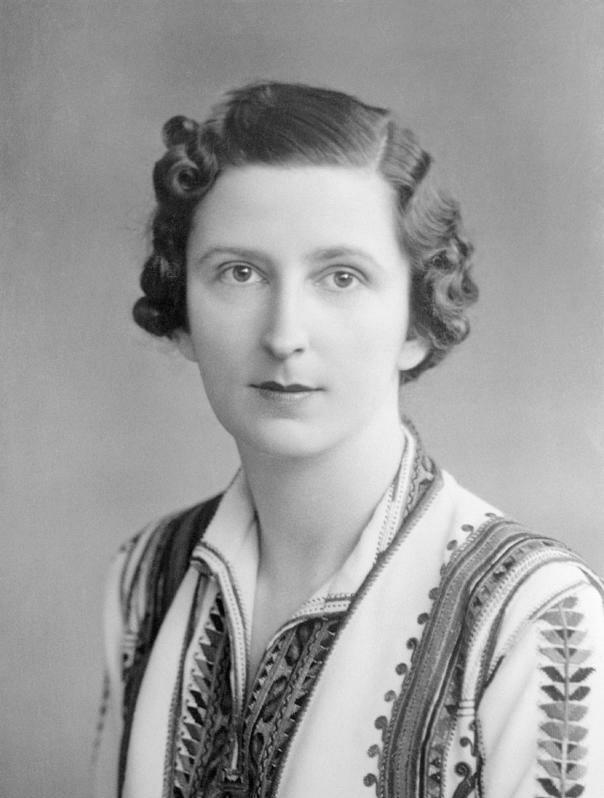
Giovanna of Italy, Tsaritsa of Bulgaria, 1937

On 21 October 1896, Victor Emmanuel married Princess Elena of Montenegro, daughter of King Nicholas I of Montenegro. Their issue included:

1. Yolanda (1 June 1901 – 16 October 1986), married Giorgio Carlo Calvi, Count of Bergolo on 9 April 1923. They had five children.
2. Mafalda (19 November 1902 – 28 August 1944), married Prince Philipp of Hesse on 23 September 1925. They had four children. She died in the Nazi Buchenwald concentration camp.
3. Umberto, later Umberto II, King of Italy (15 September 1904 – 18 March 1983) married Princess Marie José of Belgium on 8 January 1930. They had four children.
4. Giovanna (13 November 1907 – 26 February 2000), married King Boris III of Bulgaria on 25 October 1930. They had two children including Simeon II, King and later Prime Minister of Bulgaria.
5. Maria Francesca (26 December 1914 – 4 December 2001), married Prince Luigi of Bourbon–Parma on 25 January 1939. They had four children.

Other notable relatives included Amedeo, 3rd Duke of Aosta, his cousin once removed and Viceroy of Italian East Africa in 1937–1941, and Aimone, 4th Duke of Aosta, his grandson and king of the 1941–1943 puppet state of Croatia.

== Bibliography ==
- Kershaw, Ian (2007). Fateful Choices. London: Allan Lane.
- Mack Smith, Denis (1989). Italy and its Monarchy. Yale University Press. ISBN 0-300-05132-8.

Victor Emmanuel III House of Savoy Born: 11 November 1869 Died: 28 December 1947
Regnal titles
Preceded by Umberto I	King of Italy; 29 July 1900 – 9 May 1946	Succeeded by Umberto II
Preceded by Haile Selassie I	Emperor of Ethiopia (Partially internationally recognised); 9 May 1936 – 5 May 1941	Succeeded by Haile Selassie I
Preceded by Zog I	King of the Albanians (Partially internationally recognised); 16 April 1939 – 8 September 1943	Succeeded by Loss of Title (Zog I as claimant)
Awards and achievements
Preceded by Miguel Primo de Rivera	Cover of Time Magazine; 15 June 1925	Succeeded by Charles Horace Mayo
