= Princess Yolanda of Savoy =

Eldest daughter of King Victor Emmanuel III of Italy (1901–1986)

Princess Iolanda
- Countess of Bergolo
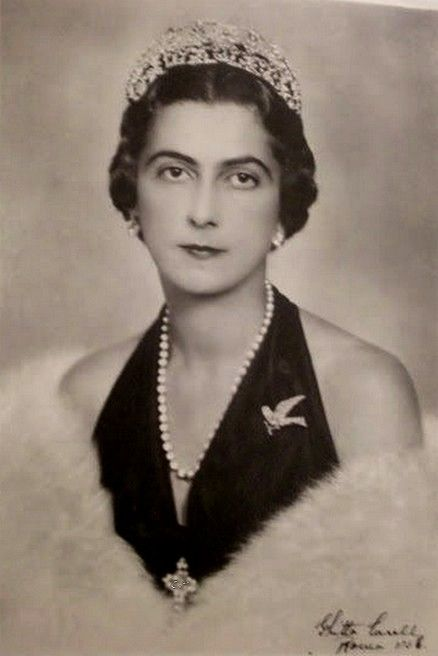
- Princess Iolanda in 1936
- Born: 1 June 1901; Rome, Kingdom of Italy
- Died: 16 October 1986 (aged 85); Rome, Italy
- Burial: Monumental Cemetery, Turin
- Spouse: Giorgio Carlo Calvi, Count of Bergolo (m. 1923; died 1977)
- Issue: Maria Ludovica Calvi di Bergolo; Giorgio Calvi di Bergolo; Vittoria Calvi di Bergolo; Guja Calvi di Bergolo; Pier Francesco Calvi Conte di Bergolo
Names
- Iolanda Margherita Milena Elisabetta Romana Maria di Savoia
- House: Savoy
- Father: Victor Emmanuel III of Italy
- Mother: Elena of Montenegro

Princess Yolanda of Savoy (1 June 1901 – 16 October 1986) was the eldest daughter of King Victor Emmanuel III of Italy.

== Biography ==
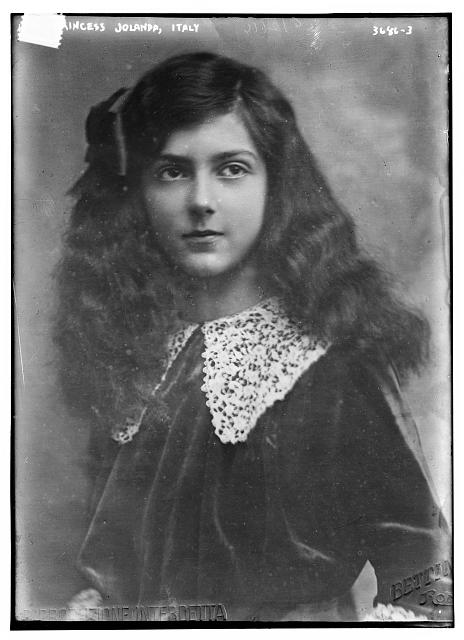
Princess Yolanda as a young girl

She was born Principessa Iolanda Margherita Milena Elisabetta Romana Maria di Savoia (English: Princess Yolanda Margaret Milena Elizabeth Romaine Mary of Savoy) in Rome, Italy, as the eldest child and daughter of King Victor Emmanuel III of Italy and Elena of Montenegro. As a young woman she was a great sportswoman, particularly interested in swimming and riding.

During the Great War, newspapers published reports of her engagement to the Prince of Wales, the future Edward VIII, who was serving in Italy in 1918. There was no basis for these rumors, but they were resurrected in 1919 when Yolanda joined her mother Elena of Montenegro, her sister Princess Mafalda of Savoy, and the Duchess of Aosta (Princess Hélène of Orléans) on a visit to Paris, where the prince happened to be at the same time.

On 9 April 1923, she married Giorgio Carlo Calvi, Count of Bergolo.

After her marriage, Yolanda lived in the town of Pinerolo, southwest of Turin.

In 1946, Yolanda and her family went into voluntary exile with her father in Alexandria, Egypt. After King Victor Emmanuel's death, Yolanda and her family returned to Italy, where they lived at Castelporziano.

Yolanda died in a hospital in Rome and is buried in Turin. The Giardini Principessa Iolanda in Naples are named after her.

== Marriage and children ==
On 9 April 1923 at the Quirinal Palace in Rome, she married Giorgio Carlo Calvi, Conte di Bergolo (15 March 1887, Athens – 25 February 1977, Rome). They had five children:

- Maria Ludovica Calvi di Bergolo (27 January 1924, Turin – 19 July 2017, Rome) married Robert Gasche (1918 – 2011) in 1948 (div. 1975) and had issue:
  - Huberto-Omar (b. 1954)
  - Elena-Maria (Yela) (b. 1955)
- Giorgio Calvi di Bergolo (1 May 1925 – 7 May 1925)
- Vittoria Calvi di Bergolo (22 June 1927, Turin – March 1986, Garda), married in 1947 Guglielmo, Conte Guarienti di Brenzone and had issue:
  - Emanuela (b. 1948)
  - Agostino (b. 1951)
  - Guariente (b. 1954)
- Guja Calvi di Bergolo (b. 8 March 1930, Turin), married in 1951 Carlo nob. dei conti Guarienti and had issue:
  - Maria-Fardivia (1952 – 1971)
  - Delfinella (b. 1954)
- Pier Francesco Calvi, Conte di Bergolo (22 December 1933, Turin – 18 June 2012, Rome), married in 1958 Marisa Allasio (born 1936). Had issue:
  - Carlo-Giorgio (b. 1959)
  - Anda (b. 1962)

== Title, styles and honours ==
=== Title ===
- 1 June 1901 – 9 April 1923: Her Royal Highness Princess Yolanda of Savoy, Princess of Italy
- 9 April 1923 - 25 February 1977: Her Royal Highness Princess Yolanda of Savoy, Princess of Italy, Countess of Bergolo
- 25 February 1977 - 16 October 1986: Her Royal Highness Princess Yolanda of Savoy, Princess of Italy, Dowager Countess of Bergolo

=== Honours ===
==== National honours ====
- (Kingdom of Italy) House of Savoy: Dame Grand Cross of the Royal Order of Saints Maurice and Lazarus
- Sovereign Military Order of Malta: Dame Grand Cross of Honour and Devotion of the Sovereign Military Order of Malta, 3rd First Class

== Ancestry ==
Ancestors of Princess Yolanda of Savoy

8. Victor Emmanuel II of Italy
4. Umberto I of Italy
9. Archduchess Adelaide of Austria
2. Victor Emmanuel III of Italy
10. Prince Ferdinand, Duke of Genoa
5. Princess Margherita of Savoy
11. Princess Elisabeth of Saxony
1. Princess Yolanda of Savoy
12. Mirko Petrović-Njegoš, Grand Voivode of Grahovo
6. Nicholas I of Montenegro
13. Anastasija Martinović
3. Princess Elena of Montenegro
14. Voivode Petar Vukotić
7. Milena Vukotić
15. Jelena Voivodić

== Bibliography ==
- "Iolanda's Wedding Festivities Start", New York Times, April 8, 1923, p. 3.
- "Iolanda and Calvi Meet Italian Court", New York Times, April 9, 1923, p. 19.
- "Iolanda Wedded to Her War Hero While Crowd Cheers", New York Times, April 10, 1923, p. 1 and 3.
- "Royal Wedding in Rome", The Times, April 10, 1923, p. 12.
- "Princess Yolanda's Wedding", The Times, April 12, 1923, p. 16.
- "Princes Jolanda" [obituary], New York Times, October 18, 1986, p. 9.
