= Antonio Lippi =

Italian aviator

Air Divisional General Antonio Lippi
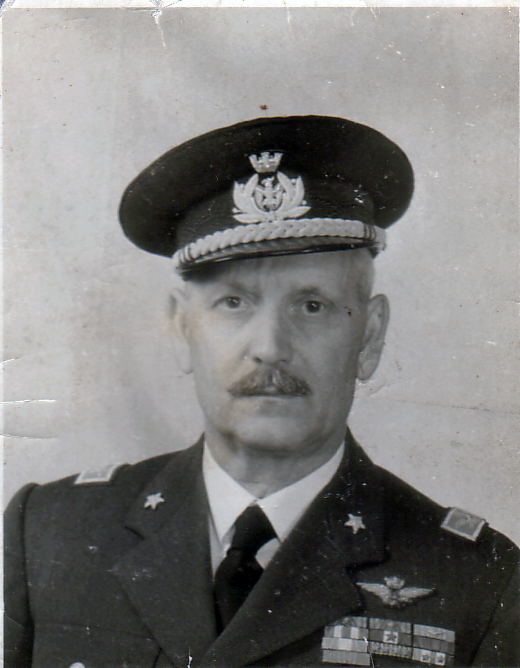
- Antonio Lippi in uniform

Italian high speed aviator

Personal details
- Born: 9 October 1900 Torremaggiore, Italy
- Died: 2 February 1957 (aged 56) Palermo, Italy
- Spouse: Amalia Stingone (m. 1940)
- Children: Nicola; Alfonso; Lorenzo
- Awards: Gold medal of Aeronautical Valor; Silver medal of Aeronautical Valor

Military service
- Allegiance: Kingdom of Italy; Italy
- Branch/service: Regia Marina; Regia Aeronautica; Aeronautica Militare Italiana
- Years of service: 1915–1957
- Rank: Air divisional General
- Battles/wars: World War II:

Antonio Lippi (9 October 1900 – 2 February 1957) was an Italian aviator. He participated in the transatlantic flight organized by Italo Balbo and was awarded the Gold Medal of Aeronautic Valor of the Regia Aeronautica.

Lippi was born in Torremaggiore, a small town in the south of Italy on October 9, 1900, to a wealthy landowning family.

He had a passion for flying since he was a child. As a young adult, he decided not to follow his family's wishes but his own passion. He started his career by enrolling in the military for officials of the Regia Marina.

Lippi attained his pilot's license in Scuola di Pilotaggio di 2° Periodo in Foggia Sud airport (nowadays Gino Lisa airport).

After his degree of captain of lingo corso, he was nominated guardiamarina in 1921; after three years he joined the Italian Royal Air Force (Regia Aeronautica) and later the 184th Squadriglia Idrovolanti, where in 1925 he attained his seaplane pilot's license for Savoia-Marchetti S.59 and S.59bis airplanes.

He was selected to join the group of aviators that took part in the 1928 Crociera del Mediterraneo Occidentale (Orbetello - Los Alcázares) with a Savoia-Marchetti S.59bis.

== High speed aviator ==
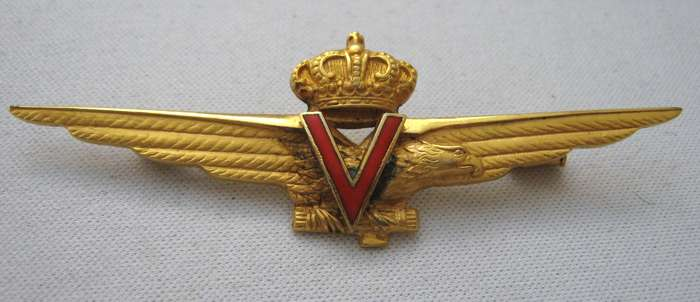
Velocisti uniform emblem

From 1930 to 1932 he took service at Reparto Alta Velocità (high speed unit) of Desenzano del Garda. He was admitted to the II Course for high speed seaplanes piloting the Macchi-Castoldi MC-72.

As part of Velocisti (high speed runners) he was allowed to wear a special emblem with a red V in the middle of an eagle on his uniform.

== Crociera del decennale: the first massed flight of aircraft ever to cross the Atlantic ==
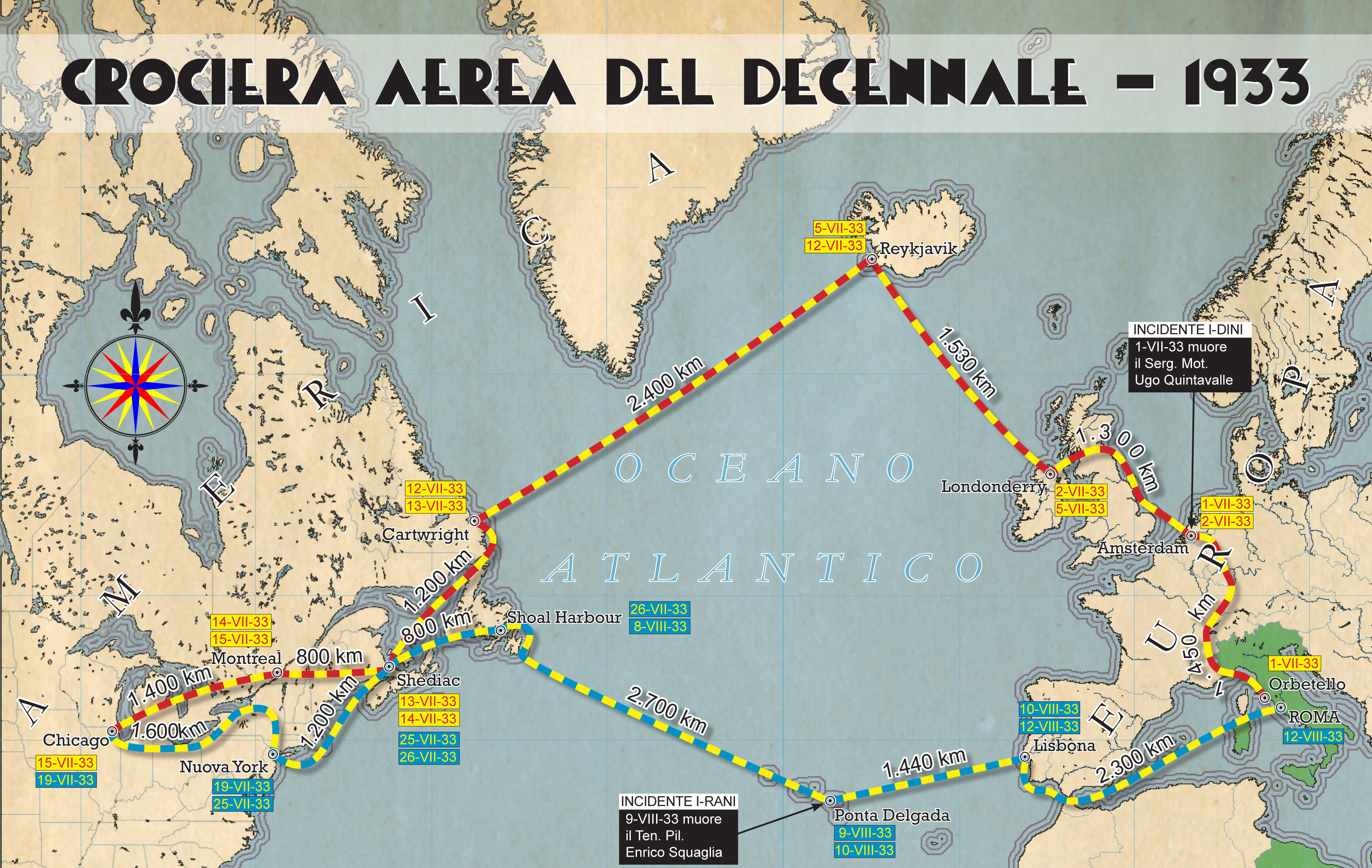
The Italian Air Armada route from Rome to Chicago in 1933

In 1933 Lippi was selected again by Italo Balbo to take part in the epic Crociera del Decennale known by Americans as Italian Air Armada, this was the first massed flight of aircraft ever to cross the Atlantic.

From 1 July to 12 August 1933, a flight of twenty-four seaplanes embarked on a round-trip flight from Rome to the Century of Progress in Chicago, Illinois. The flight had eight legs; Orbetello — Amsterdam — Derry — Reykjavík — Cartwright, Labrador — Shediac— Montreal ending on Lake Michigan near Burnham Park and New York City. In honor of this feat, Mussolini donated a column from Ostia to the city of Chicago, known as the Balbo Monument. It can still be seen along the Lakefront Trail, a little south of Soldier Field. Chicago administration renamed the former 7th Street in Balbo Drive and staged a great parade in his honor. The Newfoundland Post Office overprinted a 75-cent airmail stamps, that has just been issued a few weeks previously, for the event.

From Chicago they flew to New York City with an escort of 36 U.S. airplanes. New York's population gave a crowded welcome to the pilots on Broadway. Millions of people acclaimed the parade of dozens cars escorted by police horses throughout the streets on Manhattan.

His plane (Savoia-Marchetti S.55X) during the aircruise was marked as "I-LIPP" under the wings and on tail.

For that reason Antonio was honored with the Medaglia d'Oro to Aeronautic Valor and with a promotion to Maggiore rank.

== Career and family ==
Lippi took part in the famous group of high speed aviators called "Sorci Verdi" and in 1937 raced the flight competition Istres–Damascus–Paris Air Race. His Savoia-Marchetti SM.79 (Competizione Sportiva version) was marked as I-LICA. In the Damascus point he had an accident during the takeoff: hit a hole in the semi prepared strip and destroyed his undercarriage and could not continue. Despite everything he managed to maintain the control of the airplane. For that occasion was awarded with Medaglia d'Argento al Valore Militare. His team won the competition reaching the first, second and third position.

His pilot skills brought him to Stormo Aerosiluranti, the main Regia Aeronautica flight storm.

In 1940 he married Amalia Stingone with whom he had three sons: (1941) Nicola, (1943) Alfonso (1946) Lorenzo and settled his home in Rome.

In 1943 he became Capo di Stato Maggiore nel Comando SAS and in 1944 in chief of comando raggruppamento bombardieri e trasporti.

== After World War II ==
After the World War II was integrated into the new air force of the new Repubblica Italiana: Aeronautica Militare.

In 1947 he took command of Direzione Generale Armi e Munizioni and became the Inspector General of the Air Force.

For his human grace and his aviator skills he was honored with Generale di Divisione Aerea.

He died in Palermo on February 2, 1957 and was proclaimed official day of mourning.

== Legacy ==
In Torremaggiore there is a street entitled in his honor: Via Generale Lippi.

At Museo storico dell'Aeronautica in Bracciano there is a section focused on the Crociera del Decennale where are conserved some historical photos and models.

You can order a model of the Savoia-Marchetti S.55X with the I-LIPP mark on it.

On April 29, 2017, on the 60th anniversary of his passing, his life was celebrated with a personal exhibition at Museo Civico di Torremaggiore with models of seaplanes, historical photos, antiquities.

== Bibliography ==
- Stato Maggiore Aeronautica - ufficio storico, Archivio medaglie d'oro al valore aeronautico, faldone 6, pagina 2
- Giuseppe Valle, Uomini nei cieli, storia dell'Aeronautica Italiana, Roma, C.E.N. (Divulgazioni Umanistiche Sociologiche Storiche), 1973.
- Guido Mattioli- Ali d'Italia sull'Atlantico, 1933
- Time magazine - U.S. Edition Vol. XXI No. 26
- Crociera Aerea del 1° Decennale (newspaper)
- Il Secolo Illustrato 22/7/1933 (magazine)
- Il Secolo Illustrato 8/7/1933 (magazine)
- L'Ala d'Italia (Rivista Aeronautica) Settembre 1933
- Le Vie dell'aria numero speciale 1933
- P.A. Colombini - Le aquile del decennale
- Italo Balbo - La Centuria Alata
- Official book of the flight Gen. Italo Balbo and his Italian Air Armada to a Century of Progress (The Cuneo Press. Inc - Chicago)
