= Commemorative Medal of the Decennial Air Cruise =

Italian military award

Commemorative Medal of the Decennial Air Cruise Medaglia commemorativa della Crociera aerea del Decennale
- Type: Commemorative medal
- Awarded for: Participation in or support of the Decennial Air Cruise in 1933
- Presented by: Kingdom of Italy
- Status: Abolished 13 December 2010
- Established: 13 August 1933

Highlights
- Total: 326
- Ribbon of the medal

The Commemorative Medal of the Decennial Air Cruise (Italian: Medaglia commemorativa della Crociera aerea del Decennale) was a decoration granted by the Kingdom of Italy to personnel who participated in or supported the Decennial Air Cruise in 1933. It was abolished in 2010 after the Italian Republic deemed it obsolete.

== Background ==
The Italian Regia Aeronautica ("Royal Air Force") was established in 1923, and to celebrate the 10th anniversary of its founding, the Regia Aeronautica organized the Decennial Air Cruise, a mass transatlantic flight from Orbetello, Italy, to the Century of Progress International Exposition at Chicago, Illinois, in the United States. Consisting of 25 Savoia-Marchetti S.55X double-hulled flying boats under the command of General Italo Balbo, it was the first mass flight to cross the North Atlantic. Departing Orbetello on 1 July 1933 and welcomed enthusiastically during stops it made in the Netherlands, the United Kingdom, Iceland, Canada, and particularly the United States, the flight was a propaganda success for Fascist Italy. The flight returned to Italy with stops in the Dominion of Newfoundland, the Azores, and Portugal before concluding at Rome on 12 August 1933.

== History ==
To grant a special and honorific decoration in memory of participants in the Decennial Air Cruise, the Kingdom of Italy established the Commemorative Medal of the Decennial Air Cruise with Royal Decree Number 1748 of 13 August 1933. The medal was awarded by the Prime Minister of Italy (officially known as the Head of Government, Prime Minister Secretary of State from 1925 to 1943) in memory of those who had lost their lives during the cruise itself. After deeming the medal obsolete, the Italian Republic abolished it on 13 December 2010.

== Eligibiity ==
Eligibility for the medal extended to personnel who had taken part in the Decennial Air Cruise, either in flight, or aboard ships or at bases in support of the flight. Personnel who otherwise had demonstrated particular merit in preparation for or implementation of the flight also qualified for the medal.

== Appearance ==
=== Medal ===
The medal is a bronze disc with a diameter of 32 millimetres (1.3 in). The obverse depicts an effigy of King Victor Emmanuel III on a fasces and the inscription Vittorio Emanuele III Re d'Italia ("Vittorio Emanuele III King of Italy"). The reverse bears the inscriptions Crociera aerea del Decennale ("Decennial Air Cruise") and Roma-Chicago-New York-Roma – luglio-agosto 1933–XI ("Rome-Chicago-New York-Rome – July–August 1933–XI"), the outline of a Savoia-Marchetti S.55X flying boat, and space to engrave the given name and surname of the recipient of the medal and the justification for the award.

=== Ribbon ===
The ribbon is scarlet.

=== Display ===
The medal was worn on the left chest with a scarlet ribbon. The ribbon alone could be worn on the chest instead of the medal.
