= Alessandro Miglia =

Italian aviator

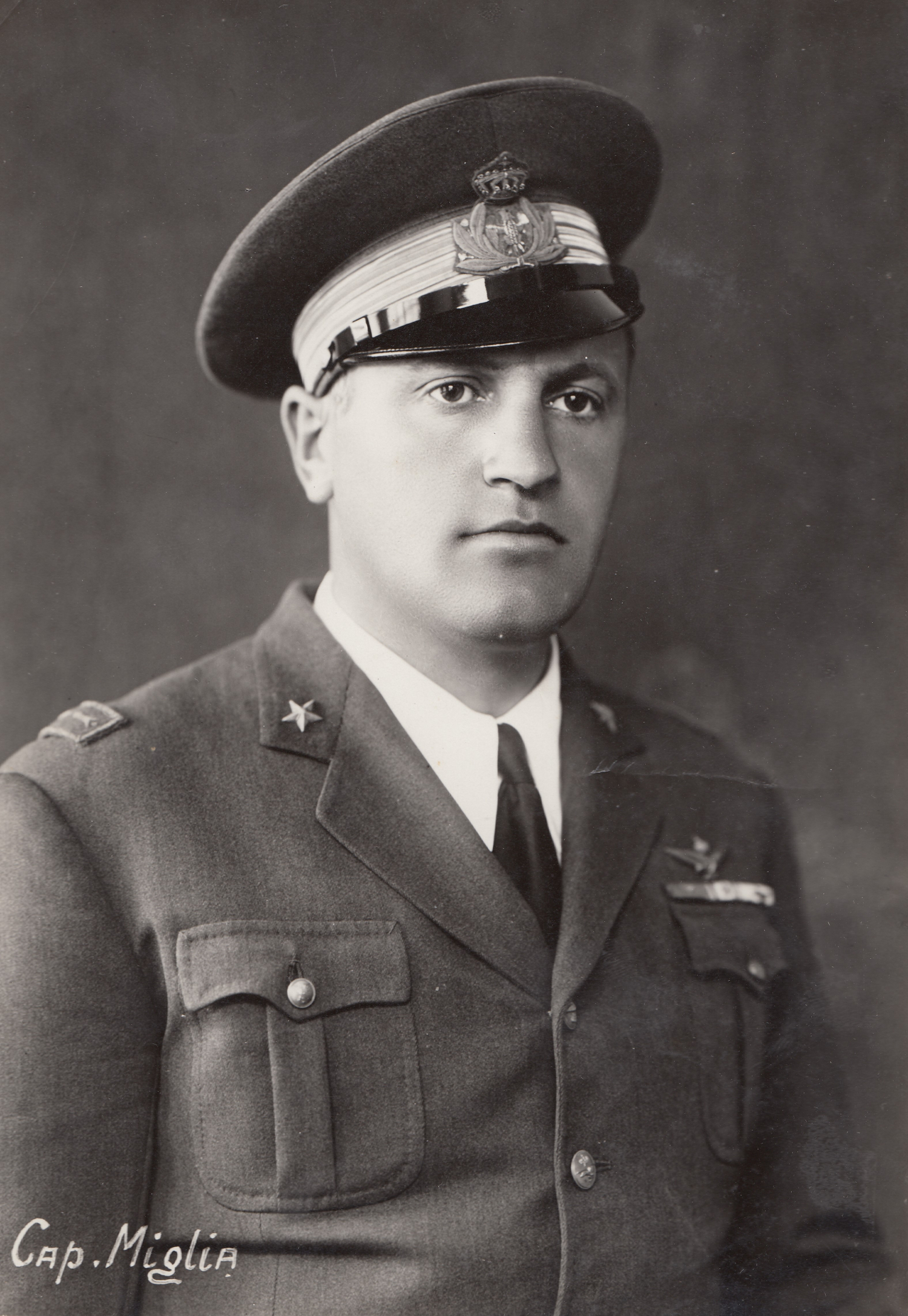
- Captain Alessandro Miglia
- Born: 27 April 1900; Susa, Italy
- Died: 27 April 1939 (aged 39); Italian Libya (presumed)
- Cause of death: Lost in flight during a Ghibli storm in a Savoia-Marchetti S.M.79
- Burial place: Unknown
- Military career
- Allegiance: Kingdom of Italy
- Branch: (Kingdom of Italy) Regia Aeronautica
- Service years: 1923–1939 (Note: sources say he was enrolled in the Royal Italian Navy before joining the Italian Royal Air Force, but actual dates are not specified; the Italian Wikipedia estimates 1921-1922)
- Rank: Major
- Commands: IV Squadriglia Stella Nera (Decennial Air Cruise)
- Known for: Participation in Balbo's mass flights, Decennial Air Cruise
- Awards: Silver Medal of Military Valor; Knight, Order of Saints Maurice and Lazarus; Knight, Colonial Order of the Star of Italy

Alessandro Miglia (27 April 1900 – 27 April 1939) (Note: There are some discrepancies between the sources regarding the exact birth and death date; using the ones printed on the official cenotaph.) was an Italian aviator and military officer, notable for his participation as a squadron commander in the Decennial Air Cruise led by Italo Balbo. He was declared missing in flight in 1939.

== Biography ==
Born in Susa in 1900 into a family with military traditions, Alessandro Miglia initially pursued a maritime career. After serving on sailing ships and steamships, he became a Reserve Officer in the Regia Marina (Royal Italian Navy) and served aboard Royal Submarines.

Attracted to aviation, he applied to join the Regia Aeronautica (Royal Italian Air Force) in 1923 and qualified as a military pilot in 1924. He became part of the air formations led by Italo Balbo, participating in early mass formation flights: the Western Mediterranean Cruise (1928), the Eastern Mediterranean Cruise (1929), and the Italy-Brazil Transatlantic Cruise (1930–1931), for which he was awarded the Gold Medal of Aeronautic Valor.

=== Decennial Air Cruise ===
The highlight of his flying career was his participation in the 1933 Decennial Air Cruise, a mass transatlantic flight from Orbetello to Chicago and back (via New York and Rome), organized by Balbo to celebrate the tenth anniversary of the March on Rome. During this expedition, Miglia, holding the rank of Captain, commanded the IV Squadron, identified by black markings and named Stella Nera (Black Star). He piloted the Savoia-Marchetti S.55X seaplane bearing the registration I-MIGL.

The event garnered significant media attention and propaganda value; special commemorative stamps were issued, including the well-known Balbo Triptych, overprinted with the codes of participating aircraft, including Miglia's.

After the Decennial Air Cruise, Miglia was promoted to Major for special merits, and continued his career in the Regia Aeronautica.

=== Disappearance ===
On 27 April 1939, Maj. Miglia disappeared while on a flight with fellow aviator Jacopo Calò Carducci. They had departed from Qasr bin Ghashir aboard a Savoia-Marchetti S.M.79 aircraft, bound for El-Maden, a location beyond Tobruk near the Egyptian border. The aircraft never reached its destination and is presumed to have crashed in the Libyan Desert due to a severe Ghibli storm. Despite search efforts by the Italian Air Force and Navy in Libya, in which Governor Italo Balbo himself participated, no wreckage or remains of the two pilots were ever found. The Villaggio Azzurro (Air Force residential village) at Bari Palese Airport was later named in memory of Alessandro Miglia. A cenotaph was erected in the cemetery of his hometown, Susa, in his honor.

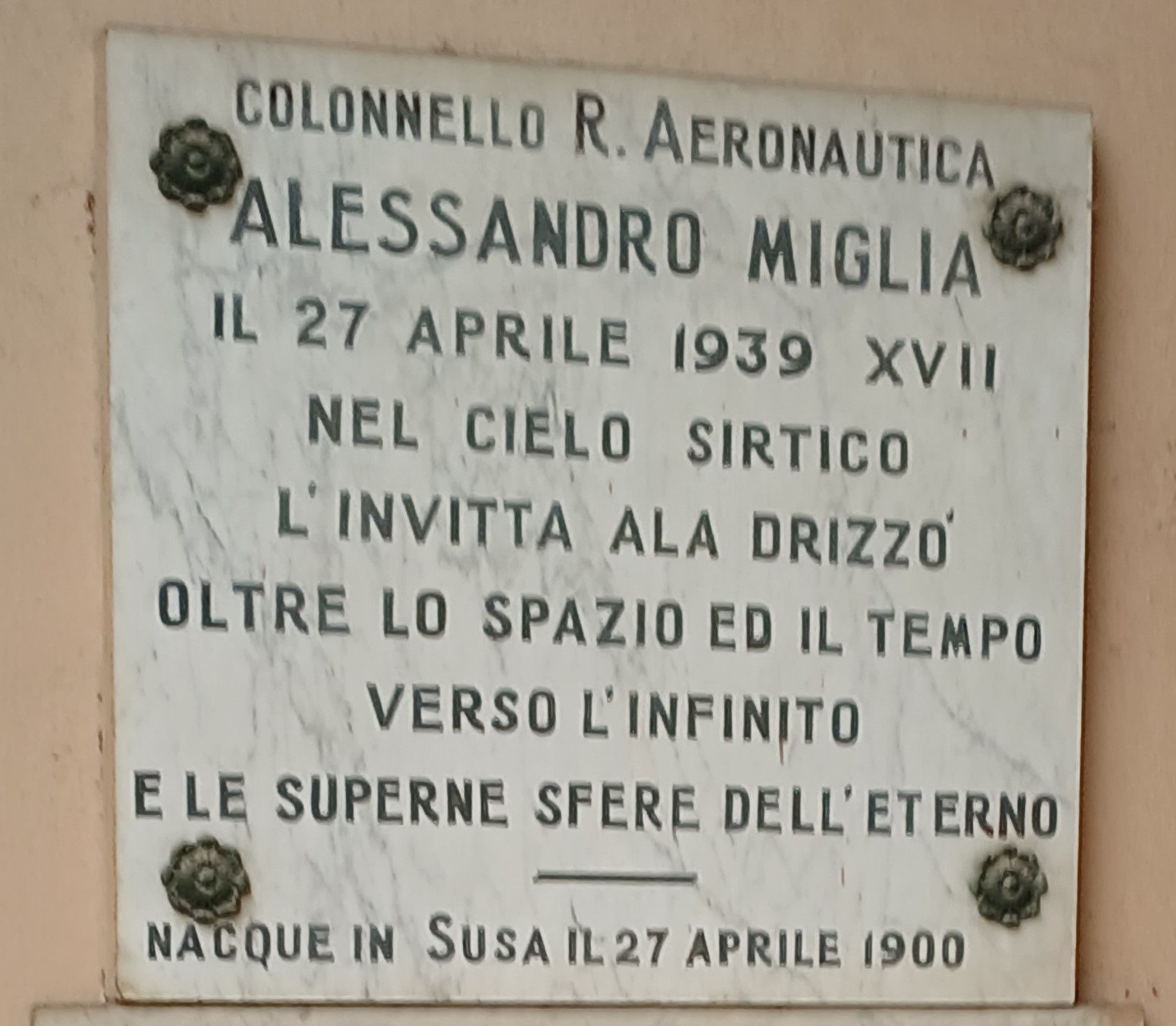
Cenotaph for Alessandro Miglia in the cemetery of Susa, Piedmont

== Honours ==
- Silver Medal of Military Valor
- Knight of the Order of Saints Maurice and Lazarus
- Knight of the Colonial Order of the Star of Italy

== See also ==
- Decennial Air Cruise
- Italo Balbo
- Regia Aeronautica
- Savoia-Marchetti S.55
- Savoia-Marchetti S.M.79
