= Stefano Cagna =

Italian aviator (1901–1940)

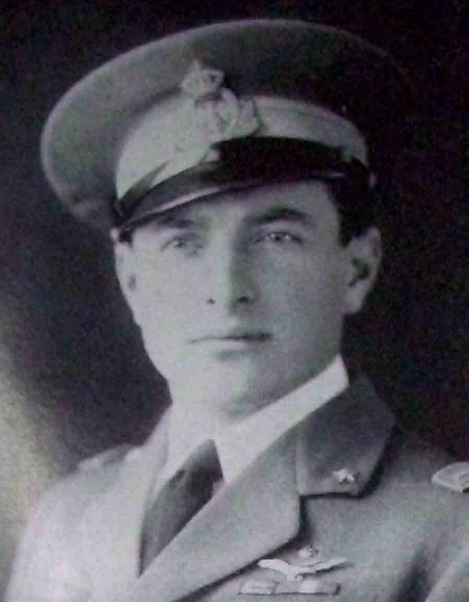
- Born: 25 December 1901; Ormea, Italy
- Died: 1 August 1940 (aged 38)
- Military career
- Allegiance: Kingdom of Italy
- Branch: Royal Air Force
- Rank: Brigadier General
- Awards: Gold Medal of Military Valor

Stefano Cagna (25 December 1901 – 1 August 1940) was an Italian aviator, a Brigadier General of the Italian Royal Air Force, he fought in World War II and was decorated with the gold medal for valour in memory.

== Biography ==
Nicknamed "Stuin" (Stefanino), he enlisted as an officer in the Italian Royal Navy and earned his pilots license on seaplanes. In 1927 he was assigned to the Seaplanes Experimental Center in Vigna di Valle in the town of Bracciano (Rome), at the namesake lake where he was able to stand out for his skills, so much so that the Secretary of State for Aviation Italo Balbo wanted him as an instructor to perfect his own piloting of seaplanes. The powerful Quadrumviro was so impressed by the young lieutenant's skills that since then always put the utmost confidence in him as a pilot and as a collaborator, entrusting him with important assignments and choosing him as his own personal co-pilot in the Air Cruises that would see them soon protagonists.

== The "Cruises" ==
The year after in 1928, Balbo appointed Cagna to study the feasibility and preparations for the accomplishment of the Western Mediterranean Cruise from 26 May to 2 June with a formation of SIAI S.9bis and Savoia-Marchetti S.55 for a total of 61 planes. The raid was carried out along a route that started and finished in Orbetello, covering 2,804 kilometers in training and touching various parts of the Iberian Peninsula. It was the first of a series of prestigious demonstrative air campaigns, with whom Balbo wanted to impress the international community about the abilities of the young Italian Air Force. Unlike what happened in the lonely flies, individual crews completed long runs on challenges that most exalted the courage of the individual, the head of the Regia Aeronautica preferred to organize "flying fleets", in which a substantial number of aircraft he himself commanded in flight, they ran long distances to demonstrate the progress of technology and reliability of the Italian aeronautical solutions. In these trasvolate, Italo Balbo would always carry Stefano Cagna as co-pilot and as a valuable help in the organization.

== The rescue of the "Red Tent" ==
Returned from his flights across the Mediterranean, Air Secretary Balbo decided to send out Cagna as a co-pilot of the already famous aviator Umberto Maddalena on a Savoia-Marchetti S.55A to the rescue of General Umberto Nobile, who had crashed on the Arctic sea ice on 25 May and attended on the ice shell with some survivors in the famous "red tent" after the disaster of the airship Italia. The two, driven by land from the shipwrecked airship by means of a rudimentary wireless system, succeeded, despite great difficulties due to weather conditions, to find and supply the unfortunate explorers on the ice, allowing them to survive until 12 July, the date of arrival of the Krassin icebreaker that brought them to safety.

After this feat, he was awarded the gold medal to the aviation value and was granted with the rank of lieutenant in the Italian Royal Air Force leaving the Regia Marina. Italo Balbo wanted him with him as a flight assistant, and in all subsequent flights across the Atlantic firmly as co-pilot particularly in the Transatlantic aerial Cruise Italy-Brazil and in the Decennial Air Cruise.

== Brigadier General ==
In 1938, Cagna helped Air Marshal Balbo in creating the first unit of the Italian Army paratroopers, the Fanti dell'Aria, at the airport of Castel Benito whose Stefano Cagna himself was responsible.

He was appointed Air force chief in Libya and appointed Brigadier General on 16 March 1939 at only 38 years old, the youngest general in Italy. He left Libya in 1940 when he accepted the task of reorganizing the Italian civil aviation, thereby separating himself from Balbo for the first time in his career.

After Italy's entry into World War II on 10 June 1940 and the death of Balbo, shot down in the skies of Tobruk in an episode of "friendly fire" by Italian anti-aircraft artillery on 28 June that year, he returned to operational employ when he was given command of the X Air Brigade Terrestrial Bombing "Mars" based in Cagliari-Elmas equipped with the three-engined Savoia-Marchetti SM79 bomber.

== Death ==
At the command of his bombers air-brigade, he engaged personally in the first risky enforcement operations against British convoys in the Mediterranean organized to supply Malta.

On 1 August 1940, all British ships in the Mediterranean coordinated to implement Operation Hurry, whose intent was to convey 12 Hawker Hurricane fighters to Malta to strengthen the defensive capabilities of the island. General Cagna attacked with his SM79 the British H Force from Gibraltar, but off the Balearic Islands his plane, flying at the ceiling of 2,500 meters to center more effectively the enemy ships, was hit by violent anti-aircraft fire and crashed into the sea, killing him and all his crew, including Lt. Colonel Capanni and 2nd Lieutenant Guglielmo Pallavicini.

== Honors and awards ==
- Medaglia d'oro al valor militare alla memoria
- Medaglia d'oro al valore aeronautico

To the memory of Brigadier General Stefano Cagna is now named for the 15th Wing S.A.R. and C/S.A.R. of the Italian Aeronautica Militare based at Cervia Air Force Base.
