= Medal of Aeronautic Valor =

Italian military & civilian notary award

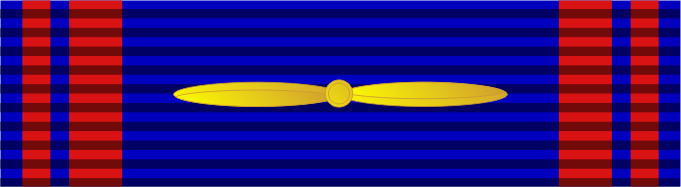
Original ribbon bar design for the Gold Medal of Aeronautic Valor

The Medal of Aeronautic Valor (Italian: Medaglia al valore aeronautico) is an Italian medal awarded "for acts and enterprises of singular courage and skill aboard an aircraft in flight." Instituted in 1927, it is awarded at three levels: Gold, Silver and Bronze. The medal may be conferred on both Italian and foreign persons and entities and on both civilians and members of the Italian armed forces. It can also be awarded posthumously.

== History ==
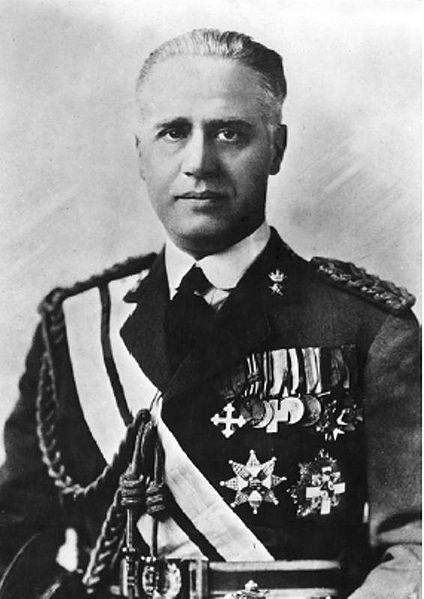
Alessandro Guidoni, the first recipient of the medal

Proposals for a medal awarded to aviators had begun as early as 1913 but were put on hold with the outbreak of World War I. Discussions resumed with the official formation of the Regia Aeronautica Italiana (Italian Royal Air Force) as a separate service in 1923. The medal was finally instituted by Victor Emmanuel III of Italy's decree of 27 November 1927. The criteria for conferral remained virtually unchanged until 1939, when a decree restricted its award solely to members of the Italian military. The restriction remained in place after the country became the Italian Republic in 1946. In 2010, the medal was absorbed into the Italian Military Code. The principal change was the restoration of eligibility to civilians.

In 1928 the first medals, all Gold, were awarded to Alessandro Guidoni, Arturo Ferrarin, and Carlo Del Prete. Prior to the outbreak of World War II, the recipients were primarily those who had distinguished themselves in air races or had set speed and distance records. However, the medal was also awarded for participation in daring air rescues. It was awarded in 1928 to Roald Amundsen (one of the few civilians and non-Italians to be awarded the medal) and his pilot René Guilbaud for their ultimately doomed flight to rescue the airship Italia. In 1938 it was awarded to Lufthansa airline pilot Kurt Grosschopff for his rescue of Mario Stoppani whose plane had crashed in the South Atlantic. Grosschopff was cited as "an admirable example of selflessness, comradeship, and a sublime disregard of danger." Recipients of the medal in the 21st century include three Italian astronauts: Roberto Vittori, Maurizio Cheli, and Luca Parmitano.

== Designs ==
=== Medal ===
Kingdom of Italy

From 1927 to 1945:

- Obverse – The Savoy Cross surmounted by an eagle with spread wings. Above the eagle is the Crown of Savoy
- Reverse – Two fasces with the name of the recipient and the place and date of the award engraved between them

Italian Republic

In the early days of the Italian Republic, the medals were minted privately without an officially decreed design. One of the initial versions resembled that of the Kingdom of Italy:

- Obverse – The Savoy Cross surmounted by an eagle with spread wings, but with the Crown of Savoy replaced by a mural crown
- Reverse – A laurel wreath with the name of the recipient and the place and date of the award engraved inside the wreath

In 1953 a new official design was decreed. The Savoy Cross and eagle on the obverse of the medal were replaced by a winged horse. The design of the present medal was officially established in 2010 and changed the design of the medal's reverse:

- Obverse – A winged horse surrounded by the words "Al Valore Aeronautico"
- Reverse – Two oak branches with the name of the recipient and the place and date of the award engraved between them

=== Ribbon bar ===
27 November 1927 to 24 March 1932
Gold	Silver	Bronze
4 March 1932 to 15 March 2010
Gold	Silver	Bronze
2010 – present
Gold	Silver	Bronze

== Notable recipients ==
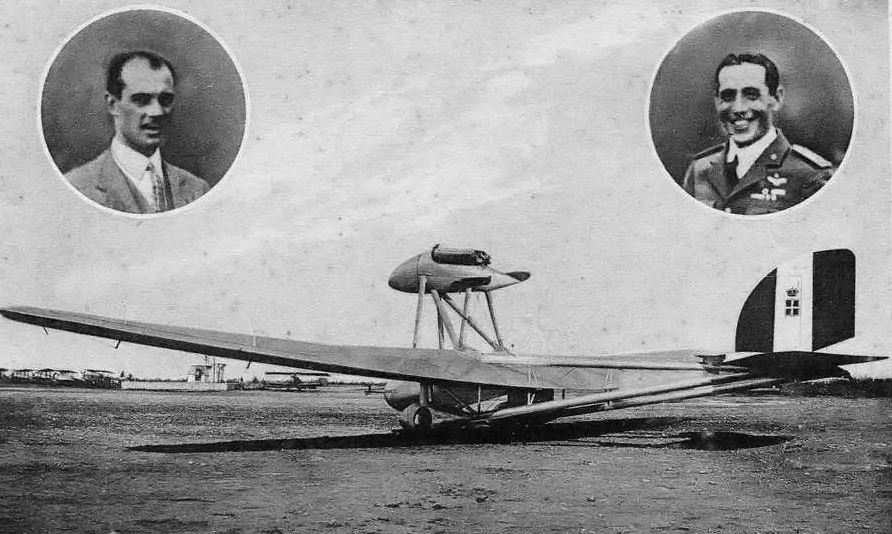
Arturo Ferrarin and Carlo Del Prete with their Savoia-Marchetti S.64

- Francesco Agello (Gold, 1934)
- Roald Amundsen (Gold, 1928 posthumously)
- Mario Aramu (Gold, 1933)
- Italo Balbo (Gold, 1931)
- Stefano Cagna (Gold, 1933)
- Maurizio Cheli (Silver, 2002)
- Carlo Del Prete (Gold, 1928 posthumously)
- Francesco De Pinedo (Gold, 1934 posthumously)
- Arturo Ferrarin (Gold, 1928)
- Alessandro Guidoni (Gold, 1928 posthumously)
- René Guilbaud (Gold, 1928 posthumously)
- Antonio Lippi (Gold, 1933)
- Bruno Mussolini (Gold, 1941 posthumously)
- Luca Parmitano (Silver, 2007)
- Mario Pezzi (Gold, 1937)
- Mario Stoppani (Gold, 1938)
- Filippo Zappata (Gold, 1991)
- Roberto Vittori (Gold, 2002)
