= Mario Aramu =

Italian aviator (1900–1940)

Mario Aramu (7 April 1900 – 16 December 1940) was an Italian aviator.

Aramu was born in Cagliari. As Colonel of Regia Aeronautica, he participated in the Atlantic cruises organized by Italo Balbo and fell in combat near Marmarica, Libya, during an aerial action.

== Honours and awards ==
- Gold Medal for Valor (Skyes of Marmarica, 17 December 1940, Regio Decreto 30 December 1940)
- Silver Medal for Valor
- Bronze Medal for Valor (Regio Decreto 3 October 1929)
- Medaglia d'oro al valore aeronautico (Regio Decreto 13 August 1933)
- Order of the German Eagle

== Bibliography ==
- Ruggero Bonomi, Viva la Muerte. Diario dell'"Aviacion del El Tercio", Roma, Ufficio Editoriale Aeronautico, 1941.
- Chris Dunning, Combat Units of the Regia Aeronautica. Italia Air Force 1940-1943, Oxford, Oxford University Press, 1988, ISBN 1-871187-01-X.
- Chris Dunning, Solo coraggio! La storia completa della Regia Aeronautica dal 1940 al 1943, Parma, Delta Editrice, 2000.
- (Håkan Gustavsson, Ludovico Slongo, Desert Prelude, Operation Compass, Wydawncictwo, Stratus, 2010, ISBN 978-83-61421-18-4.
- Håkan Gustavsson, Ludovico Slongo, Desert Prelude, Early Clashes June–November 1940, Wydawncictwo, Stratus, 2010, ISBN 978-83-89450-52-4.
- I reparti dell'Aeronautica Militare, Roma, Ufficio Storico Stato Maggiore dell'Aeronautica, 1977.
- Giulio Lazzati, Stormi d'Italia - Storia dell'aviazione militare italiana, Milano, Ugo Mursia Editore, 1975, ISBN 978-88-425-4079-3.
- Franco Pagliano, Storia di diecimila aeroplani, Milano, Edizioni Europee, 1954.
- A. Trotta, Testi delle motivazioni di concessione delle Medaglie d'Oro al Valor Aeronautico, Roma, Stato Maggiore dell'Aeronautica Militare, 1978.
- Ufficio Storico dell'Aeronautica Militare, Testi delle motivazioni di concessione delle Medaglie d'Oro al Valor Militare, Roma, Stato Maggiore dell'Aeronautica Militare, 1969.
- Vincenzo Moccia, La Cina di Ciano, Padova, Libreria Universitaria Edizioni, 2014, ISBN 88-6292-514-X.
