= Alessandro Guidoni =

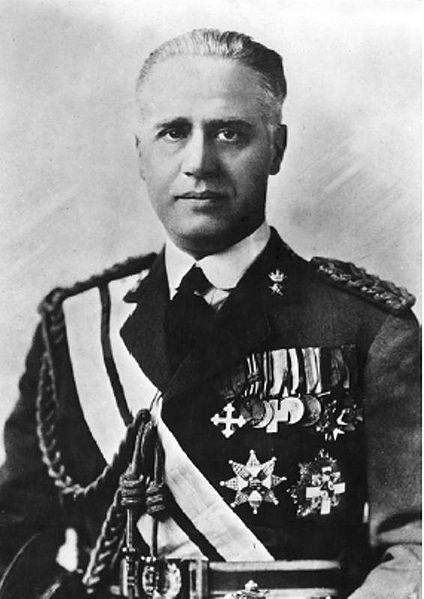
- Born: July 15, 1880; Turin, Italy
- Died: April 27, 1928 (aged 47); Montecelio, Italy
- Military career
- Allegiance: Italy
- Branch: Italian Royal Army Military Aviation Corps; Italian Royal Air Force
- Service years: early 1900s–1928
- Rank: General
- Conflicts: Italo-Turkish War; World War I
- Awards: Gold Medal for Aeronautic Valor

Alessandro Guidoni (July 15, 1880 – April 27, 1928) served as a general in the Regia Aeronautica (Italian Royal Air Force). Guidonia Montecelio, the small town and comune where he died while testing a new parachute, was named after him in 1937.

== Life ==
Guidoni was born in Turin, Italy, on 15 July 1880. He obtained his degree in engineering at the Turin Polytechnic in 1903 and in 1905, while serving in the Navy Engineering Corps, took his second degree in naval engineering. In 1909 he developed a keen interest in the newborn Corpo Aeronautico Militare ("Military Aviation Corps") of the Regio Esercito (Italian Royal Army), joining many aviation pioneers.

Guidoni served in the Italo-Turkish War of 1911-1912 as a pilot trainee, soon achieving a full certification and flying "hydroplanes" (seaplanes). He then started studying weaponry and developed a new gyroscope-guided bomb to be delivered by planes against distant targets. In 1912, as a captain, he experimented with the air-launching of torpedoes by dropping weights from a Farman biplane. He also drew the plans of the seaplane carrier Europa, which entered service with the Regia Marina (Italian Royal Navy) in 1915.

In 1920, Guidoni joined the Italian Embassy in London as military attaché with the rank of colonel. When the Corpo Aeronautico Militare separated from the army in 1923 to become an independent service, the Regia Aeronautica, he became a member of the new service, and achieved the rank of general.

On the morning of 27 April 1928, being dissatisfied with its design, Guidoni tested personally a new model of parachute at the Regia Aeronautica airfield at Montecelio, Italy, and was fatally injured when it failed.

== Commemoration and legacy ==
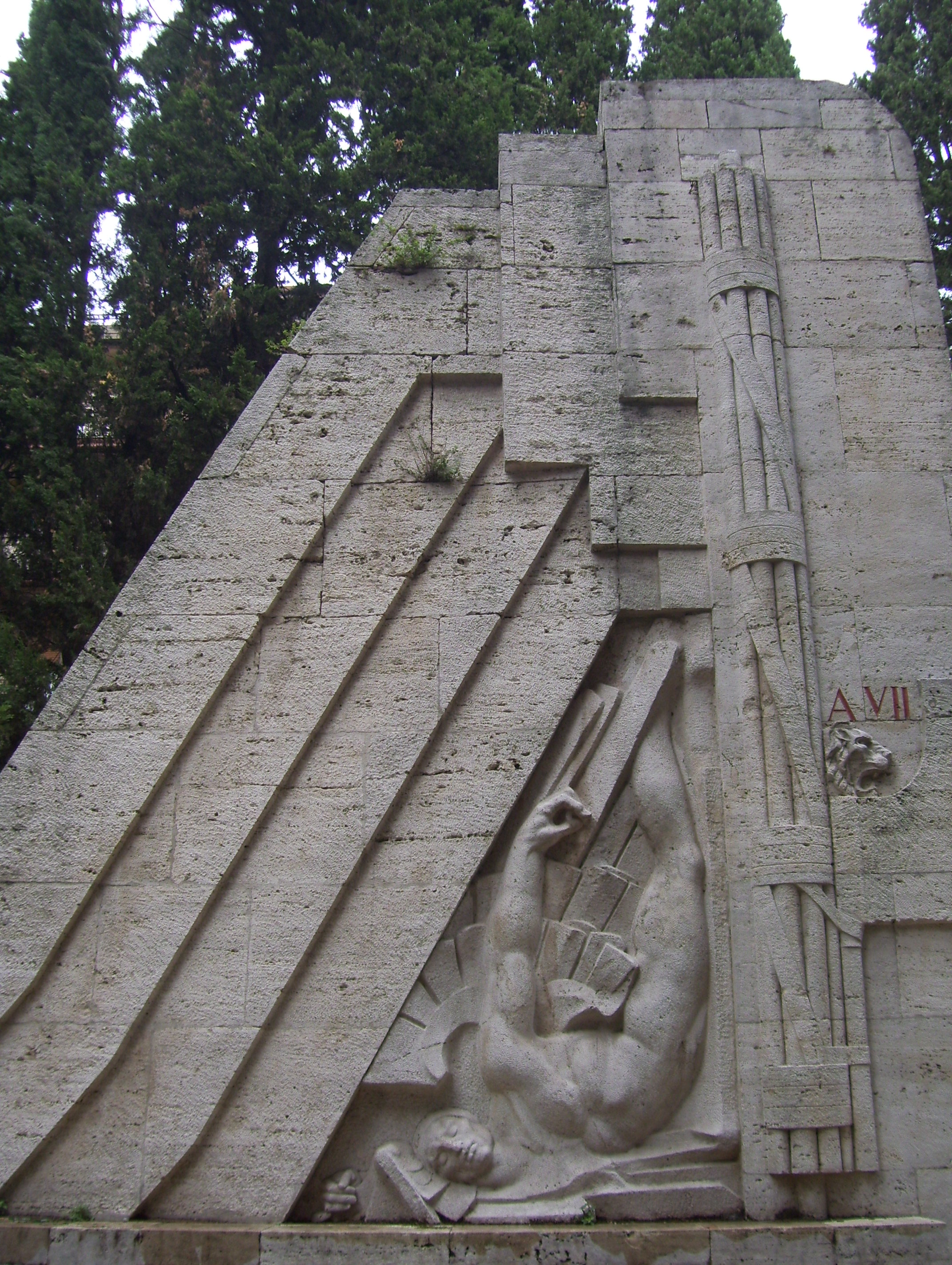
Monument to Guidoni at the Guidoni Military Airfield, north of Rome

Guidoni posthumously received the Medaglia d’Oro al Valore aeronautico ("Gold Medal for Aeronautic Valor").

The third Dornier Do X flying boat built, the X3, registered as I-ABBN, was named Alessandro Guidoni in Guidoni's honor, and entered service in May, 1932. A private airline, Società Anonima di Navigazione Aerea (SANA) flew it initially; the Regia Aeronautica later operated it.

In the 1930s a town was built around the airfield at Montecelio to house military personnel. Benito Mussolini, the Italian Duce, laid the town's founding stone on 27 April 1935, the seventh anniversary of Guidoni's death. In 1937, Montecelio and the surrounding comune were renamed Guidonia Montecelio in Guidoni's honor.

Only a military airfield exists at Guidonia Montecelio today, but a memorial to Guidonia stands on the exact spot where he died in front of the Sacred Heart of Jesus Church.

Guidoni's passion for flight was celebrated publicly by General Ermanno Aloia of the Aeronautica Militare Italiana (Italian Air Force) celebrated Guidoni's passion for flight 26 April 2006 with these words: “A perfect fusion of military engineer and scientist, General Guidoni (ITAF) represents more than anyone else in our country the passion of man to conquer space, reach other planets, and investigate stars.”

== Decorations ==
Gold Medal for Aeronautic Valor

== Bibliography ==
- Alessandro Guidoni, Aviazione, idroaviazione : origine, storia, sviluppi, dagli albori alle traversate aeree dell'Atlantico : note, documenti, disegni, progetti, studi, esperienze ideate ed effettuate dall'eroico generale Alessandro Guidoni raccolte ordinate da Guido Mattioli, Roma, Pinciana, a. XIII dell'E.F. (1935/36)
- Intervento del gen. Isp. Capo Ermanno Aloia alla cerimonia di commemorazione del gen. Guidoni del 26 aprile 2006
- Portale Aeronautica Militale Italiana
- hazegray.org World Aircraft Carriers List: Italy
- Chant, Chris. The World's Great Bombers. New York: Barnes & Noble Books, 2000. ISBN 0-7607-2012-6.
