= Balbo Monument =

Stone column in Chicago, United States of America

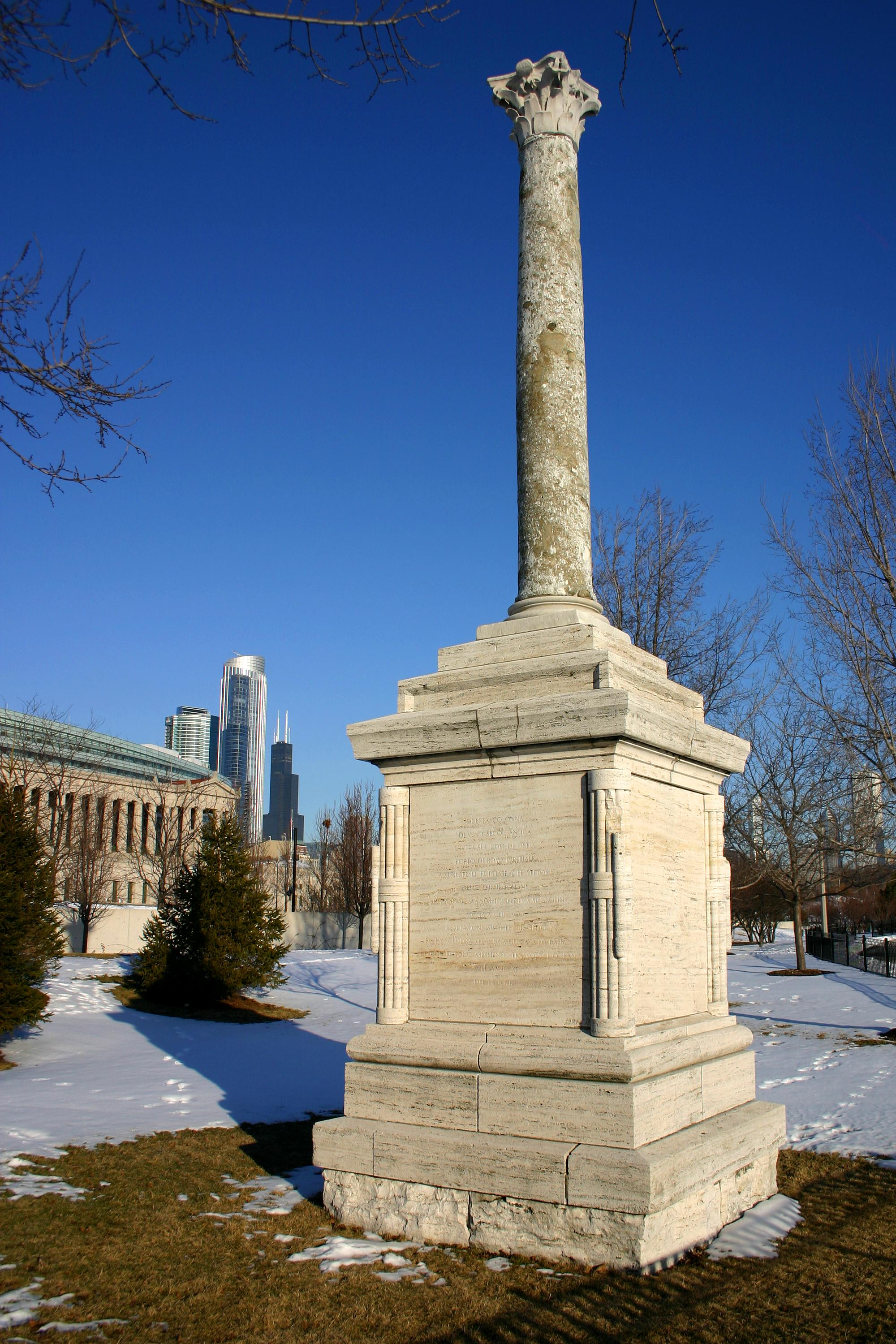
- Interactive map of Balbo Monument
- Location: Chicago, Illinois, United States
- Coordinates: 41°51′41″N 87°36′49″W

The Balbo Monument consists of a column that is approximately 2,000 years old dating from between 117 and 38 BC and a contemporary stone base. It was taken from an ancient port town outside of Rome by Benito Mussolini and given to the city of Chicago in 1933 to honor the trans-Atlantic flight led by Italo Balbo to the Century of Progress Worlds Fair.

== History ==
The Balbo Monument includes a column that was taken from a site about 200 meters outside of Porta Marina in Ostia. The building that the column originated from is called the Prospetto a Mare which translates to the Prospectus to Sea. Due to extensive renovation that was done during the second century AD, many of the buildings throughout the settlement of Ostia were repurposed or built over. Although this building endured through years of change and innovation, there are very few records still in existence that pertain to the building's original purpose.

After Benito Mussolini had the pillar removed from its original place in Ostia, he had it converted into a monument that he gave to the City of Chicago. It was transported by boat to America and arrived in Chicago in 1934 during the Century of Progress World's fair and placed in front of the Italian Pavilion. While the fair was eventually disassembled, the column was left standing in its original place just a short distance from the shores of Lake Michigan in an often overlooked area of Burnham Park. This token was a tribute to the first transatlantic crossing made by the Italian air force and fascist general, Italo Balbo.

== Creation ==
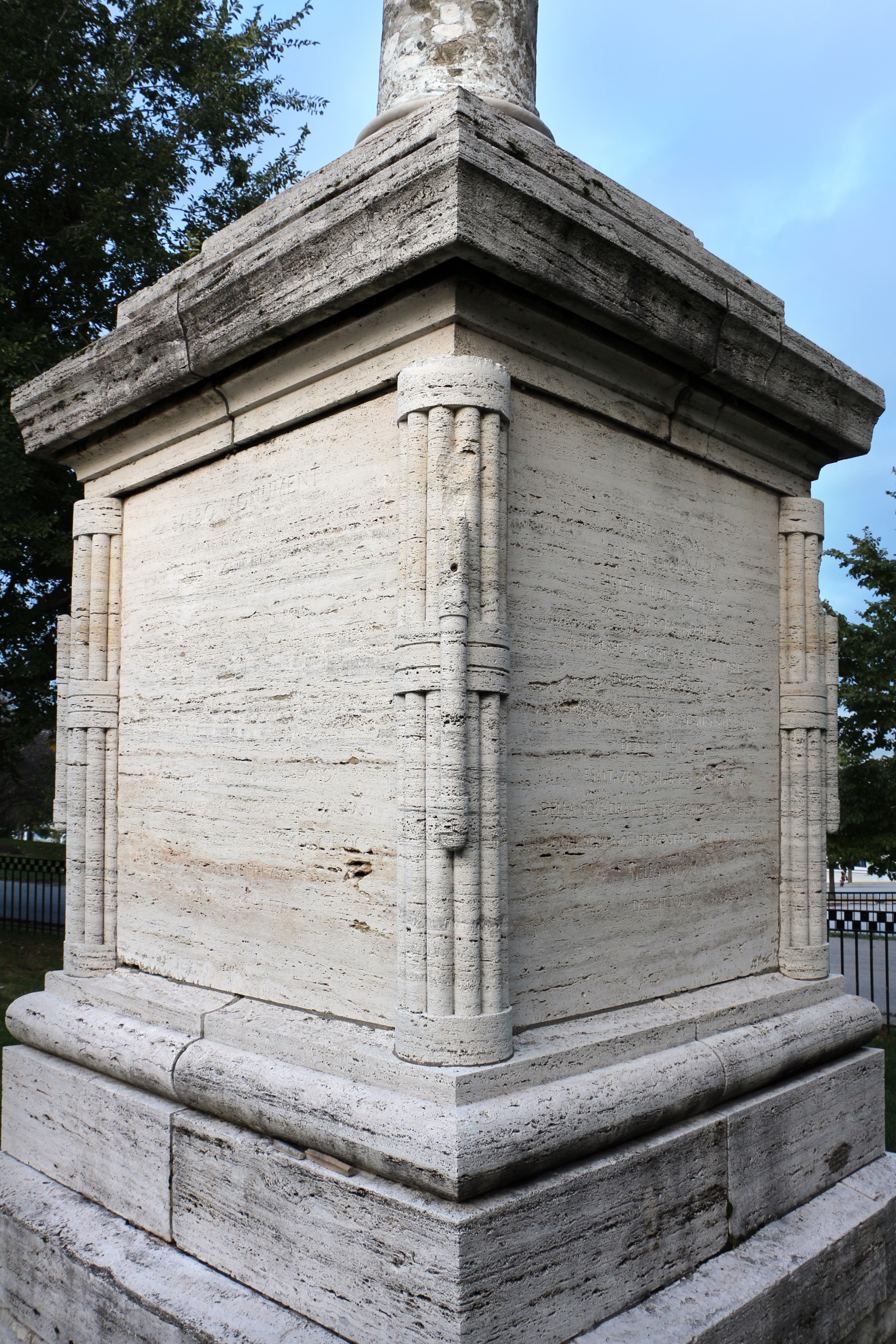
The axes have been removed from the Fasces.

The Romans constructed the column from breccia, a type of stone created from the combination of angular gravel and the fragments of boulders. The pillar is a greenish color, thirteen feet tall and three feet in diameter. Two Italian architects named Capraro and Komar created the base of the monument out of travertine, a type of light colored limestone frequently used in Roman architecture. They inscribed a message in Italian. In English the message reads:

This column
twenty centuries old
erected on the beach of Ostia
port of Imperial Rome
to safeguard the fortunes and victories
of the Roman triremes
Fascist Italy, by command of Benito Mussolini,
presents to Chicago
exaltation, symbol, memorial
of the Atlantic Squadron led by Balbo
that with Roman daring flew across the ocean
in the 11th year
of the Fascist era.

== Controversy ==
At the time of its installation, relations between Fascist Italy and the United States were friendly. Balbo in particular was popular, especially in Chicago. However, even at the time, local antifascist groups protested the monument, with the Italian Socialist Federation and the Italian League for the Rights of Man writing in a widely distributed leaflet: "“It is a disgrace that this murderer and terrorist should be received by Democratic America as the official representative of the Italian people."

After the end of Second World War, the anti-fascist Italian ambassador to the United States Alberto Tarchiani requested that the tributes to Balbo be removed. Mayor Edward J. Kelly, surprised, reportedly asked: "Why? Didn't Balbo cross the Atlantic?"

Balbo's pillar endured in spite of intermittent objections. In 2017, after racist violence at the Charlottesville rally, there was discussion about renaming Balbo Drive and removing the monument due to Balbo's fascist ideology, as well as his regime as governor of Libya, under which he supported Italy’s forced annexation of Ethiopia. However, Italian-American civic groups protested the removals, arguing that Balbo was anti-Nazi - Balbo opposed Italy's alliance with Nazi Germany - and citing his importance to the Italian-American and aviation communities. In 2022, a city commission on monuments suggested its removal, meeting similar objections. As of November 2026, it remains in place.

== See also ==
- List of public art in Chicago
