= Decennial Air Cruise =

Mass transatlantic flight in 1933

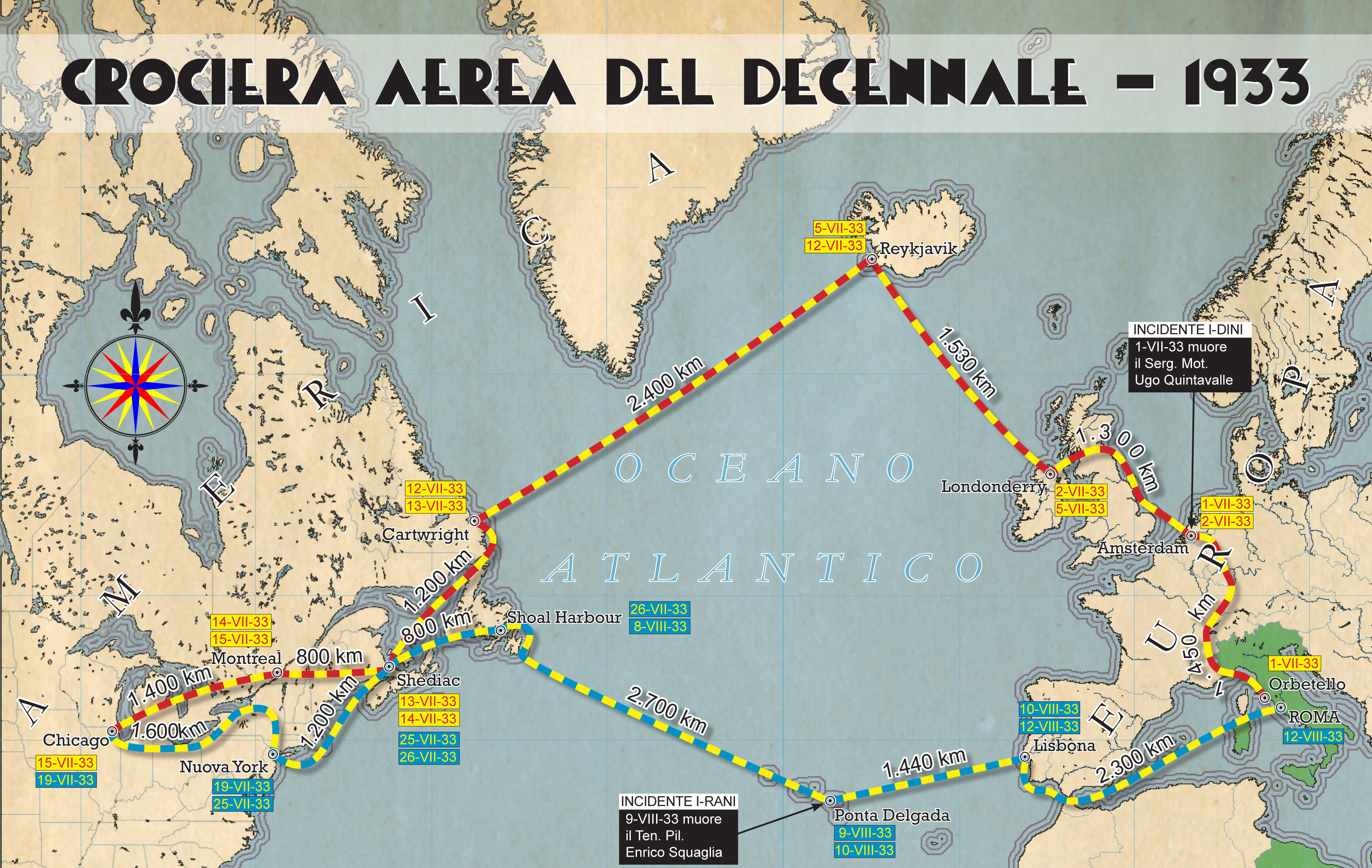
Route of the Italian Air Armada during the Decennial Air Cruise

The Decennial Air Cruise (Italian: Crociera aerea del Decennale) was a mass transatlantic flight from Orbetello, Italy, to the Century of Progress International Exposition, Chicago, Illinois. The expedition, organized by the Italian Regia Aeronautica, began on July 1, 1933, and ended on August 12 of the same year. It consisted of 25 Savoia-Marchetti S.55X seaplanes crossing the Atlantic Ocean in formation, forming the greatest mass flight in aviation history. The Italian squadrons, led by General Italo Balbo, were welcomed enthusiastically in the Netherlands, the United Kingdom, Iceland, Canada, and particularly in the United States of America, where they became known as the Italian Air Armada. A publicity success for Italy, Balbo further viewed the expedition as a pioneering step towards commercial flights across the Atlantic.

== Background ==
International public opinion in the early 1930s was fascinated by the progress of aviation, with attempts to fly across the ocean widely covered by the media. Pilots such as Francesco De Pinedo were so popular internationally that monuments were dedicated to them abroad. Even minor details of flights, such as delays due to bad weather, were covered by the international press. Aviation was the domain of heroes rather than part of normal daily life.

In 1928, when he was appointed General of the Air Force, Balbo was determined to make Italy the most advanced country in the world when it came to aviation. Being opposed to the stardom of individual pilots common at the time, he wanted each of them to develop a sense of belonging to a larger organization, the Air Force.

Balbo was very fond of the United States, and was motivated to establish a "permanent link" between the Italian and the American aviation. He was "delighted" by the way he was received during his visit in 1929 and hoped to fly back there.

Between 1928 and 1931, three Italian mass flights took place, one per year: across the Western Mediterranean, (Note: The 1928 cruise featured 51 Savoia-Marchetti S.59 bis flying boats, and was the first long flight with more than eight planes in formation. The planes, departing from Orbetello, made six stops: Elmas (Sardinia, Italy), Pollença (Balearic Islands, Spain), Los Alcázares (Spain), Berre (France) and Orbetello. The event resulted in international recognition, particularly in Spain and France. Multiple Savoia-Marchetti airplanes were bought worldwide, convincing Balbo of the commercial and publicity value of these undertakings.) the Eastern Mediterranean, (Note: The aerial cruise to the Eastern Mediterranean in 1929 had an even wider publicity outcome, partially because of a picture of Balbo and Red Army officers saluting the Red Flag that widely circulated in the international press. The route was: Orbetello, Taranto, Athens, Istanbul, Varna (Bulgaria), Odessa (then Soviet Union), and the planes used this time were 40.) and one crossing the Southern Atlantic Ocean. (Note: In preparation for a future crossing of the North Atlantic, it was decided to organize a mass flight across the South Atlantic. Balbo led 12 aircraft and 50 men across the Southern Atlantic from Orbetello to Rio de Janeiro. This crossing was considered easier because of more predictable weather patterns. The flight took place between 17 December 1930 and 15 January 1931, making the news worldwide. Balbo wrote an account of the expedition for the New York Times.)

Up to 1933, the history of transatlantic flights recorded only 28 successful attempts out of 78 to cross the Northern Atlantic, all of which individual flights. A mass formation crossing had never been tried before. The ten years anniversary of the March on Rome (1922–1932) was deemed by the Italian government the right occasion to attempt the mass flight, hence the expedition was dubbed Decennial Air Cruise. Although the organization of the flight took longer than expected, ending in 1933, the name was kept in celebration of another decennial, the establishment of the Royal Italian Air Force (1923–1933).

== Preparations ==
It was decided to double the number of aircraft and men that took part in the earlier transatlantic flight: this time 24 aircraft and 100 men were to be employed.

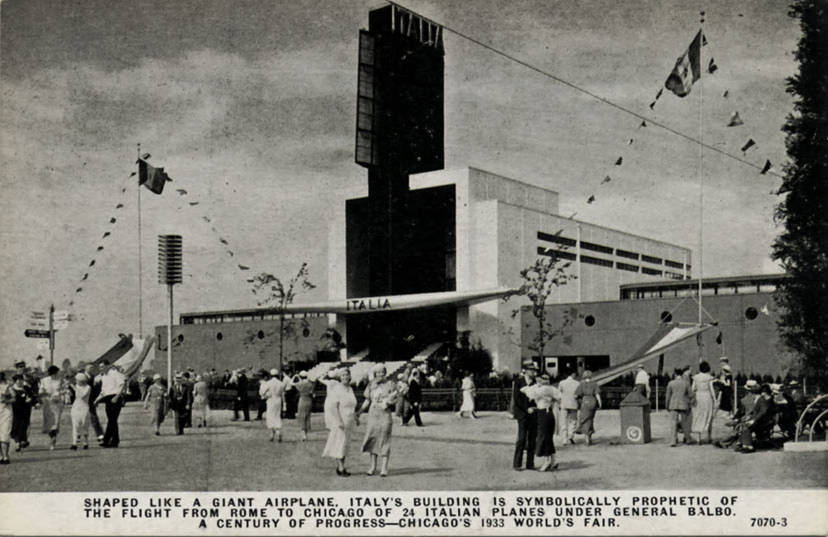
Italian building at the Century of Progress fair, Chicago

The initial plan was to fly around the world through: the Mediterranean, the Persian Gulf, India, China, Japan, Kuril Islands, Kamchatka Krai, Aleutian Islands, Alaska, California, Panama, Florida, New York, Newfoundland, Ireland, and Italy. Captain Enea Silvio Recagno was sent to the Aleutian Islands and Kamchatka Karin in May 1931 to explore the area, and he singled out Attu Island as the most appropriate base for the squadrons. The plan had to be discarded due to the Japanese invasion of Manchuria and the cost, deemed too high by Balbo given the financial crisis. Not willing to abandon the idea of pursuing the North Atlantic route, Balbo decided that the Italian planes had to reach the International Exposition in Chicago, whose motto A Century of Progress he considered particularly suitable.

Recagno was sent once again to survey the area, this time to Greenland, in April 1932. Travelling by motorboat from Godthaab to Julianehaab, he studied the meteorology of the area as well as its geography, and identified a lake in the proximity of Julianehaab as a potential base for a water landing in Greenland.

Captain Renato Abbriata instead reached Cartwright, Newfoundland and Labrador with some difficulties. Having travelled to St. John's, he met an American aviator who took him to Cartwright on a small de Havilland Moth airplane. The American died while flying on his way back, and was described by Balbo as a "glorious victim in the cause of aviation and of human solidarity". Abbriata spent three weeks in Cartwright, gathering meteorological data and studying the coast.

Major Stefano Cagna, very much trusted by Balbo and an important participant in all previous mass flights, was considered the best candidate to plan the European leg of the expedition. During his exploratory flight, Cagna flew from Orbetello to Reykjavík via Amsterdam and Derry on a S55, the same flying boat used for the transatlantic flight.

Balbo organized the Transoceanic Fliers Conference of 1932 in Rome, with the goal of gathering as much information as possible for the upcoming expedition. He also thought that the conference would have proved useful to establish a regular airplane service between Europe and the Americas in the future.

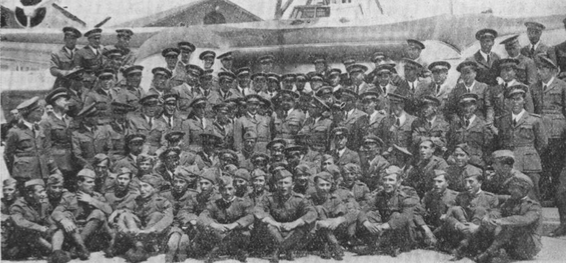
Italian Aviators that took part in the Decennial Air Cruise

Recruiting and training the pilots at the Scuola di navigazione aerea d'alto mare (SNADAM), established specifically for the expedition and led by Brigadier general Aldo Pellegrini, took two years. Seventy officers were recruited, most of which young. About a dozen veterans of the expedition to Brazil were also chosen, in order to mentor and inspire the younger officers. The practical part of the training included the expertise required to handle a flying boat on water such as sailing, as well as waves and wind movement. The winter of 1932/1933 was spent mountaineering in Misurina to prepare the men for the skills that might have been needed in case of water landing at extreme northern latitudes. The aviators learned about the various components of the seaplanes directly at the factories producing them. On the academic side, the officers took courses in mathematics, physics, aerodynamics, thermodynamics, English, and navigation. The training was hard: half of the original applicants failed and got replaced. The SM.55, which already proved its reliability during the Brazil and Eastern Mediterranean expedition, was chosen once again. Differently from all previous flights, the engine of choice this time was the Isotta Fraschini Asso 11R. In May 1933 the expedition was nearly ready to depart, but had to wait for weather conditions to improve over the Alps and northcentral Europe.

== Aircraft ==
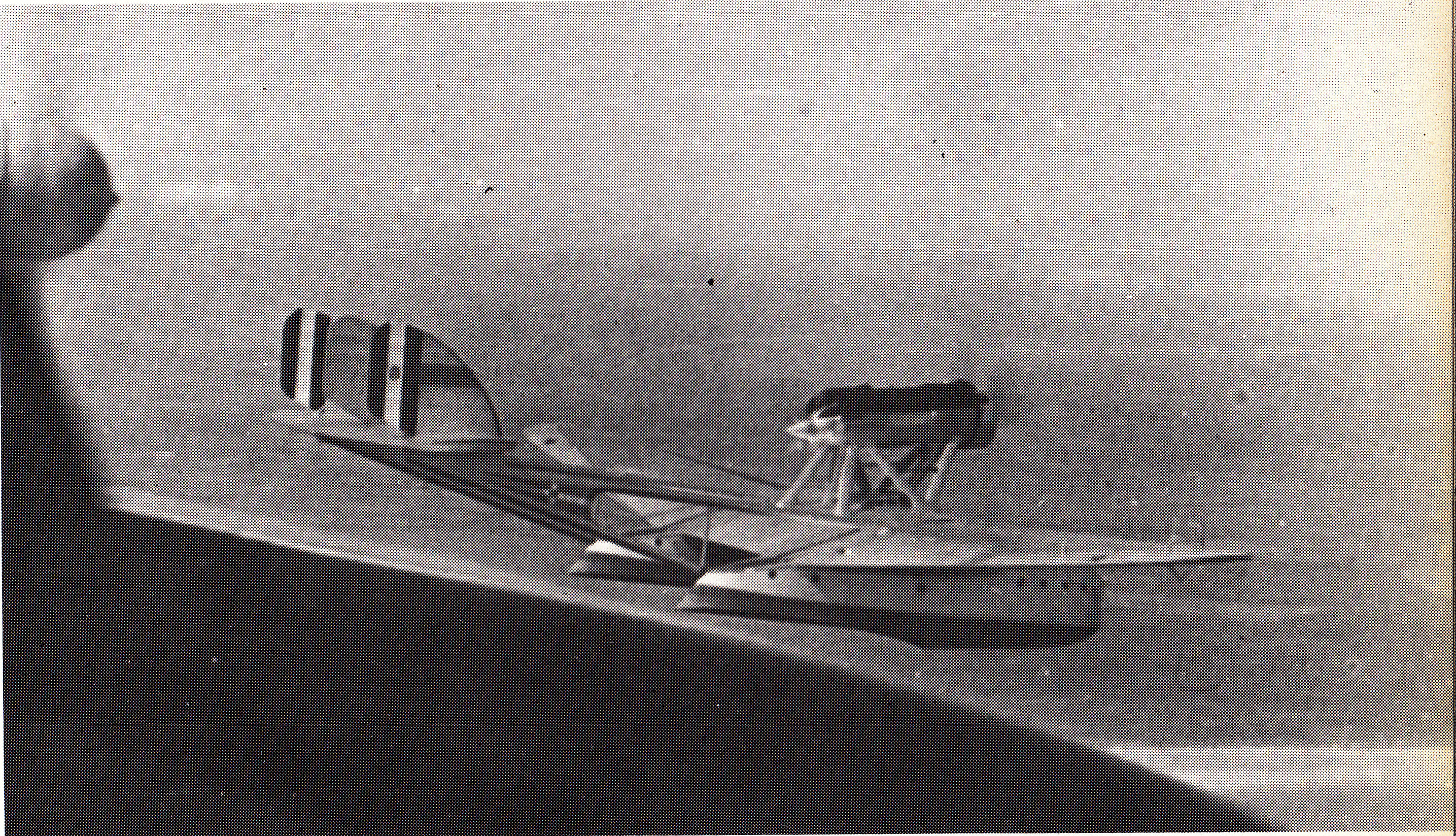
A Savoia-Marchetti S.55 aircraft during the expedition

Crew List
Registration	Commander	Crew (Second Pilot, Radio Operator, Mechanic)
I-ABBR	Capt. Abbriata Renato	Lieut. Nicoletti Aldemaro, Sgt. Arcangeli Dino, A1C D'Amuri Vincenzo
I-ARAM	Capt. Aramu Mario	Lieut. Orsolan Raffaele, Sgt. Maj. Bonaccini Cesare, A1C Frusciante Elio
I-BALB	Gen. Balbo Italo	Lt. Col. Cagna Stefano, Maj. Pezzani Carlo, Lieut. Cappannini Gino, Sgt. Berti Giuseppe
I-BIAN	Capt. Biani Vincenzo	SLt. Moretti Ireneo, Sgt. Suriani Amedeo, A1C Manara Igino
I-BISE	Capt. Biseo Attilio	Capt. Cupini Samuele, Sgt. Maj. Giulini Davide, Sgt. Parizzi Dario
I-BORG	Capt. Borghetti Bruno	Capt. Fraili Ottavo, A1C Balestri Edmondo, A1C Leone Ernesto
I-CALO	Capt. Calò Carducci Jacopo	Lieut. Palmiotti Michele, Sgt. Mascioli Tito, A1C Pinelli Oscar
I-CANN	Capt. Cannistracci Lettiero	Capt. Rossi Giorgio, Sgt. Maj. Tiraboschi Ettore, Sgt. Simonetti Alfredo
I-DINI	Capt. Baldini Mario	Lieut. Novelli Amelio, Sgt. Quintavalle Ugo, Sgt. Joria Demetrio
I-GALL	Capt. Gallo Luigi	Capt. Clingheri Luigi, Sgt. Bartolini Piero, A1C Pelosi Osvaldo
I-GIOR	Capt. Giordano Gennaro	Capt. Fiori Umberto, Sgt. Maj. Viotti Vittorio, A1C Negro Gaetano
I-LEON	Capt. Leone Leonello	Lieut. Revetria Secondo, Sgt. D'Amora Pasquale, A1C Fabbrini Remo
I-LIPP	Capt. Lippi Antonio	Capt. Ceccotti Giuseppe, A1C Bisol Mario, A1C Mastronardo Angelo
I-LONG	Lt. Col. Longo Ulisse	Capt. De Vittembeschi Ivo, Sgt. Maj Bernazzani Cesare, Sgt. Maj. Ometto Guglielmo
I-MARI; Reserve Crew	Capt. Trimboli Stefano	Lieut. Beltramo Ernesto, A1C Cuturi Arturo, A1C Delle Piane Mario
I-MIGL	Capt. Miglia Alessandro	Lieut. Fisicaro Sebastiano, Sgt. Maj. Lettini Pietro, A1C Cubeddu Giovanni
I-NANN	Capt. Nannini Umberto	Capt. Accardo Fernando, Sgt. Maj. Vaschetto Ezio, A1C Filipponi Florido
I-NAPO	Capt. Napoli Silvio	Lieut. Sarlo Francesco, Sgt. De Donno Francesco, Sgt. Virgilio Giuseppe
I-PELL	Brig. Gen. Pellegrini Aldo	Capt. Bonino Guido, Slt. Pifferi Mario, Sgt. Alberi Ettore
I-QUES	Capt. Questa Luigi	Lieut. Marrama Goffredo, A1C Antonante Domenico, A1C Zoppi Felice
I-RANI	Capt. Ranieri Celso	Lieut. Squaglia Enrico, Sgt. Maj. Cremaschi Luigi, Sgt. Boveri Aldo
I-RECA	Capt. Recagno Enea	Capt. Cadringheri Remo, A1C Chiaramonte Francesco, A1C Muzi Ugo
I-ROVI	Capt. Rovis Umberto	Lieut. Aini Giuseppe, Sgt. Cipollini Carlo, A1C Martinelli Spartaco
I-TEUC	Capt. Teucci Giuseppe	Capt. Marini Luigi, A1C Gasperini Ferrer, A1C Romeo Vincenzo
I-VERC	Capt. Vercelloni Alessandro	Capt. Frabetti Marcello, A1C Mansani Rolando, A1C Murolo Ottavio

== The North Atlantic route ==
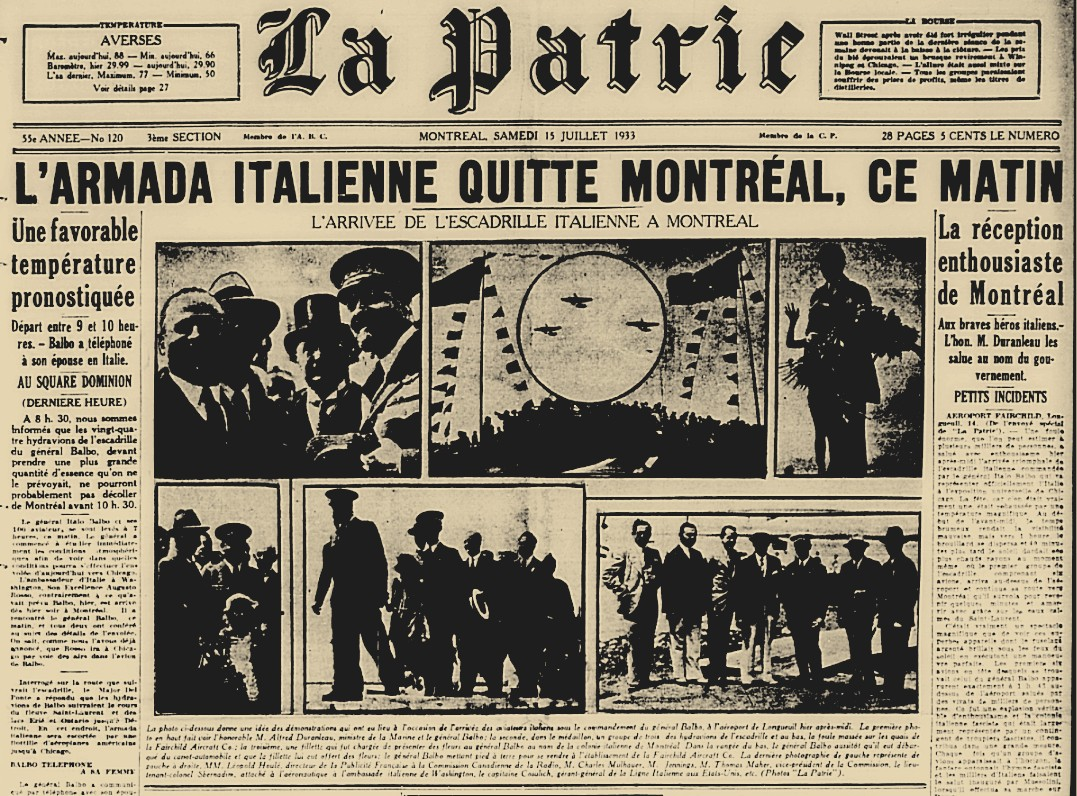
La Patrie of Montréal, featuring the Italian Air Armada on the front page (Saturday 15 July 1933)

With the weather finally cleared during the night of June 30 to July 1, Balbo set reveille at 4:15 AM for the first leg of the flight between Orbetello and Amsterdam. The aircraft flew over the Alps in formation, and after seven hours reached Amsterdam. In the Dutch city, a large number of journalists and sightseers was waiting for the water landing, during which Sergeant Mechanic Ugo Quintavalle lost his life. The seaboat flipped over, likely due to an error made by the pilot of the I-DINI aircraft Captain Mario Baldini. While three of the crew and a passenger were saved, Quintavalle died trapped in the wreckage. In Amsterdam the aviators were welcomed with public ceremonies, and Balbo was given the keys to the city. In a message to Mussolini, portrayed in an American cartoon, Balbo said: "They gave us everything but rest and sleep".

The second leg of the flight took place the day after from Amsterdam to Derry, covering the 625 miles between the two cities in 6 hours and 12 minutes. The Italian aviators traveled on a Royal Air Force speedboat through cheering crowds and were received by the Mayor at Guild Hall.

On July 5 the Armada flew from Derry to Reykjavík, encountering heavy fog for about half an hour. By dropping to an altitude of 30 meters, at which the waves were visible, they managed to fly past the fog and eventually reach the Icelandic capital safely at 6PM. Thousands of Icelanders assembled at the waterfront to welcome the airmen.

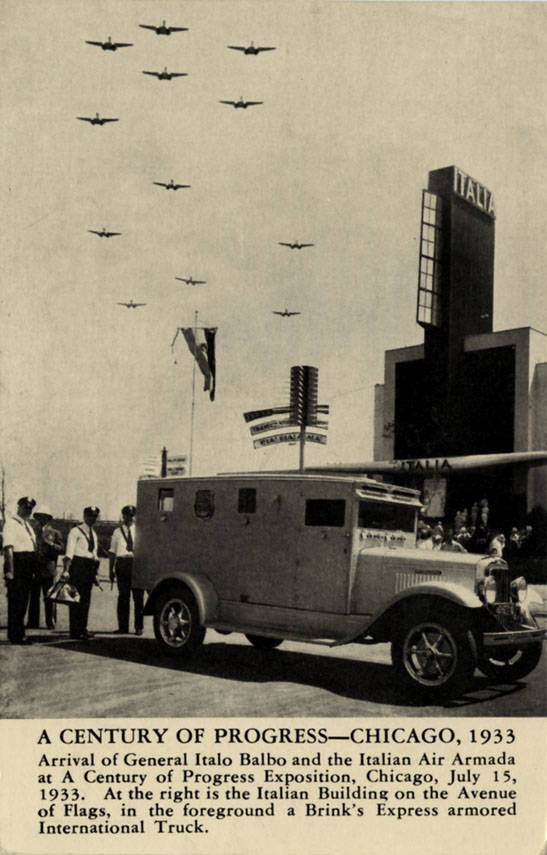
Arrival of General Italo Balbo and Italian Air Armada in Chicago

After 6 days in Reykjavík due to bad weather, on July 12 the squadrons took off with destination Cartwright, the hardest leg of the journey. In case of difficulties, the aircraft could have stopped half-way through in Julianehaab at the repair and supply depot prepared at the location identified by Captain Enea Silvio Recagno during the preparations. That was unnecessary however, and after 12 hours of flight the expedition reached Newfoundland; the number of aviators that successfully crossed the Northern Atlantic went from 28 to 127. The six hours flight from Cartwright to Shediac was uneventful amid good weather. In Shediac, where at the time the population was around 10,000, a crowd of 30,000 awaited the Italians.

On July 14 the Armada covered the distance between Shediac and Montréal in about five hours. The flight in this case was almost entirely above land, meaning that the aviators had to rely entirely on the engines as emergency water landings were not possible. At his arrival in Longueuil Balbo was furious because of various small boats flitting about in the area where the armada had to land. As a newsman approached him with a microphone, Balbo let fly a few "unparliamentary invectives", which he thought might have gone through on the radio. In Montréal the Italians were welcomed by Canadian Minister of Marine Alfred Duranleau.

During the flight between Montréal and Chicago, due to a storm above Lake Erie, the planned route had to be changed and moved 100 km north towards the Nottawasaga River, Detroit, Lake Huron and Toledo. The aviators reached Chicago on July 15, led by Balbo's aircraft which landed at 6PM CDT on Lake Michigan. The armada was escorted by 42 planes from Selfridge Field, Michigan. While the Italian SM.55 glided down in turn, the US Army planes in formation spelled "Italia" over the heads of the crowds. Balbo was welcomed by Admiral Wat Tyler Cluverius Jr., the Mayor of Chicago Edward Joseph Kelly and other dignitaries. Official reception took place at 7:25 PM on board the USS Wilmette. The aviators left Chicago Harbor at 12:43 GMT on July 19 escorted by 36 American fighter planes till Toledo. They then reached Angola at 14:10, Cleveland at 15:25, and around 17 the Italians flew above Niagara Falls. After having sighted the Hudson River at 19:20, Balbo spotted Manhattan and the Italian SS Rex. Balbo's squadron touches water in Jamaica Bay, New York City at 20:00.

== Response in the United States ==
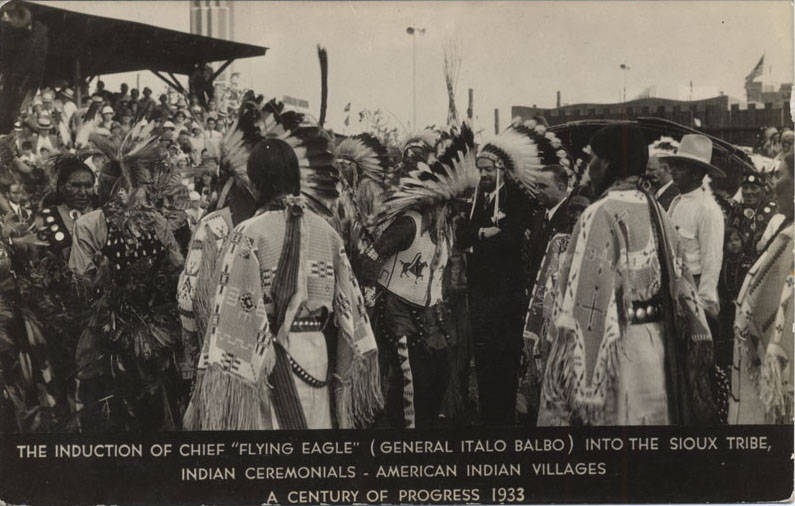
The Induction of Chief Flying Eagle (General Italo Balbo) into the Sioux Tribe

In Chicago, a crowd of more than 100,000 gathered to cheer the arrival of Balbo's fleet on the evening of July 15. During dinner at the Stevens Hotel, former judge John Sbarbaro read a message from President of the United States Franklin D. Roosevelt. Speakers at the event included the Governor of Illinois Henry Horner, Mayor Kelly, and the president of Century of Progress Rufus C. Dawes. Leaflets attacking Balbo signed by the Italian Socialist Federation circulated around the fair area. The arrival of the Italians and Balbo's speeches were broadcast by The National Broadcasting Company. Loyola University Chicago awarded Balbo an honorary degree, July 15 was proclaimed Italo Balbo Day and on July 17 Chicago's Seventh Street was renamed Balbo Avenue. Balbo received a gold key to the city from Mayor Kelly. United States Commissioner to the Century of Progress Exposition Harry Stewart New said that if Balbo remained in the US he might be elected president. In a ceremony that Balbo found particularly strange, he was initiated into the Sioux tribe as "Chief Flying Eagle". Being very cautious about his public image, Balbo was unsure whether to accept, and agreed only after hearing that former US President Calvin Coolidge also received such an honor.

The Italians were "hailed by millions" on their arrival in New York City according to the front page of the New York Times of July 20. 1500 persons watched the arrival of the planes from the Empire State Building. Balbo was quoted saying that "New York's welcome exceeded all expectations, more so even than Chicago's". On July 20 Balbo was invited by Roosevelt to lunch at the White House, where he went with a select group of his most senior aviators. The President offered his personal congratulations and tried to persuade Balbo to prolong his stay in the US to start a countrywide tour. Balbo enjoyed the lunch with Roosevelt, which he found to be "very cordial and direct in his manners, like all Americans". A crowd of 60,000 attended the celebrations at Madison Square Garden. The city of New York organized a parade down Broadway on motorcycle escort on July 21 which made a great impression on Balbo, who said "in our lives it would be extraordinary to experiment something as grandiose again".

== The South Atlantic route back to Italy ==
Balbo and the Armada left New York City on July 25 with destination Shediac, and one day later they flew to Shoal Harbour. According to the plan, they were supposed to spend a couple of days there and then reach Valentia Island, Ireland with one single 3,000-kilometre (1,860 mi; 1,620 nmi) flight on July 29. An alternative route had to be considered due to heavy storms across the North Atlantic flight path that carried on for multiple days, as well as fog banks over Ireland. While various options were being studied, Mussolini tried to ensure that Balbo would avoid London, Paris, or Berlin, afraid of being overshadowed by his rising popularity.

On August 8, after two weeks spent in Shoal Harbour (where meanwhile a street was renamed Balbo Drive), a decision was made and the expedition flew 2,700 kilometres (1,680 mi; 1,460 nmi) to the Azores. Given that in the Azores no bay was deemed large enough for all the aircraft, 15 flying boats landed at Ponta Delgada, and the remaining nine at Horta. From the Azores, the squadrons took off to Lisbon on August 9. During take off from Ponta Delgada, the I-RANI aircraft overturned, causing the death of Lieutenant Enrico Squaglia. Balbo, who anticipated difficulties taking off from the Azores, was not aware of the death of Squaglia till the arrival in Lisbon. All ceremonies in Lisbon were cancelled. The Armada covered the last 2,200 kilometres (1,370 mi; 1,190 nmi) of its trip and reached Rome on August 12.

== Aftermath ==
On 15 July 1934, one year after the flight, a Roman column sent by Mussolini to commemorate the event was unveiled in Chicago: Balbo Monument. To celebrate the 40th anniversary of the expedition, 58 of the surviving members of the flight and Paolo Balbo, son of Italo, went to Chicago for Columbus Day in 1973. They paraded through the streets with Mayor Richard J. Daley and the Governor of Illinois Dan Walker in an event attended by about 10,000.

== Medal ==
The ribbon of the Commemorative Medal of the Decennial Air Cruise.

On 13 August 1933, the Kingdom of Italy established the Commemorative Medal of the Decennial Air Cruise (Italian: Medaglia commemorativa della Crociera aerea del Decennale) in honor of those who lost their lives during the flight. Personnel who participated in or supported the flight were eligible for the medal.
