= 1937 Istres–Damascus–Paris Air Race =

In 1937, a transatlantic race was proposed to commemorate the tenth anniversary of Charles Lindbergh's pioneering solo flight from New York to Paris. The race had twenty-two entrants. There was resistance to participating in the race from the United States because any accidents might create a bad impression of nascent transatlantic passenger services.

In June 1937, the Aero-Club de France changed the race to Istres - Damascus - Paris, a course representing a similar distance to the original transatlantic flight. Competitors were expected to travel non-stop from Istres to Damascus (2971 km). On the return leg, they had the option of stopping at any point. The aircraft and crew completing the 6190 km course in the least amount of time would win the race and a prize of 1.5 million French Francs awarded by the French Air Ministry.

Thirteen of the seventeen registered crews started the race on 20 August 1937. Among the competitors was Bruno Mussolini, the son of the Italian dictator. Take off times were staggered by nationality, with the French leaving first between 18:00 and 18:30; Britain (who had only one entrant) at 21:00; finally, the Italians took off between 22:00 and 22:30. Only nine crews completed the race. Lieutenant-Colonel Ranieri Cupini and Lieutenant-Colonel Amadeo Paradisi won the race, arriving at Le Bourget airport after 17 hours 32 minutes and 43.2 seconds, aboard their Savoia-Marchetti S-79. Italian crews also took the second and third places.
