= Deaths in August 1978 =

The following is a list of notable deaths in August 1978. Entries for each day are listed alphabetically by surname. A typical entry lists information in the following sequence:

- Name, age, country of citizenship at birth, subsequent country of citizenship (if applicable), reason for notability, cause of death (if known), and reference.

== August 1978 ==
=== 2 ===
- Carlos Chávez, 79, Mexican composer, conductor, music theorist, and educator,he composed six numbered symphonies; the first, titled Sinfonía de Antígona (1933), was reworked from incidental music for Jean Cocteau's Antigone (1927), an adaptation of Sophocles' tragedy. In this symphony, Chávez sought to create an archaic ambiance through the use of modal polyphony, harmonies built on fourths and fifths, and a predominant use of wind instruments.
- Totie Fields, 48, American comedian, during the last year of her life, she was voted both the "Entertainer of the Year" and the "Female Comedy Star of the Year" by the American Guild of Variety Artists, she suffered a fatal pulmonary embolism while at home,; she was rushed to the nearby Sunrise Hospital and Medical Center, but she was pronounced dead soon after.

=== 4 ===
- Frank Fontaine, 58, American comedian, singer, and actor, during the late 1960s and into the 1970s, he regularly toured children's hospitals to spread cheer among juvenile patients, death due to a heart attack. He had just completed a live-stage benefit show, having accepted a check for $25,000 which he planned to donate for research on heart disease, when he suddenly collapsed and died because of the attack.

=== 5 ===
- Paul Cuvelier, 54, Belgian comics artist and painter, primarily remembered for his main comics series, Corentin,an action-adventure comic in the style of a Robinsonade, which was initially based on the premise of the English adventure novel Robinson Crusoe (1719) by Daniel Defoe, in 1968, Cuvelier was able to combine his passion for the female nude and his gift for drawing comics in Epoxy, a fantasy comic about the Greek gods, written by Jean Van Hamme, which is considered to be one of the first adult comics of Europe.

=== 6 ===
- Pope Paul VI, 80, head of the Catholic Church and sovereign of Vatican City from 1963 until his death in office in 1978, he revamped the entire Roman Curia, with his reforms including the reduction of bureaucracy, the streamlining of existing congregations, and a broader representation of non-Italians in the Curial positions, death caused by a heart attack.
- Edward Durell Stone, 76, American architect,despite his struggls with alcoholism, he was recommended by the Architectural Advisory Committee of the Foreign Buildings Operations (FBO) to work for the massive Cold War embassy building-program,Henry R. Shepley vouched for Stone and convinced the committee and FBO that Stone had reformed and possessed both the talent and the dedication needed to complete an embassy project,in March 1954, Stone signed a contract to design an embassy in India.

=== 9 ===
- James Gould Cozzens, 74, American writer,he was nominated for a 1957 Pulitzer Prize for his best-selling novel By Love Possessed (1957),after the publication of a controversial interview with Cozzens, an immediate barrage of readers' letters followed and were published, attacking Cozzens for supposedly being a snob, an elitist, anti-Catholic, racist and sexist — criticisms againy Cozzens' work that were soon also used by professional critics, including Irving Howe, Frederick Crews, and Dwight Macdonald, Cozzens became a symbol of "The Establishment", and he was seen as the antithesis of the growing counterculture of the 1960s, because his works negatively portrayed or lampooned the people who struggled against authority and "the system."

=== 16 ===
- Jean Acker, 85, American silent film actress and vaudevillian of Cherokee descent, wife to her fellow actor Rudolph Valentino,the Russian actress Alla Nazimova included Acker in what was dubbed the Sewing Circle, a group of actresses forced to conceal the fact that they were lesbian or bisexual, Acker was romantically involved with the Canadian actress Grace Darmond during her relationship to Valentino.

=== 17 ===
- Vera Maretskaya, 72, Soviet and Russian actress,by 1940, she was made one the faces of the Soviet propaganda films,; she shot to fame after gaining the leading role in Chlen pravitelstva (Member of the Government, 1940), for that role she was awarded the Stalin Prize, At that time Zavadsky's Theatre-Studio merged with the Mossovet Theatre, and in 1940, Maretskaya became a permanent member of the Mossoveta Theatre.

=== 18 ===
- Doris Waters, 78, English comedienne, actress, and singer, she typically performed as a double act with her sister Elsie,; in their performances as the characters Gert (Elsie) and Daisy (Doris), the sisters are credited with developing a new style of observational and naturalistic comedy, with gossipy and sometimes surreal asides, which were delivered in a conversational matter-of-fact way, but sometimes replete with misunderstandings, malapropisms and innuendo,death due to an unspecified "long illness".

=== 19 ===
- Max Mallowan, 74, British archaeologist,he became a field director for a series of expeditions managed jointly by the British Museum and the British School of Archaeology in Iraq,; his excavations included the prehistoric village at Tell Arpachiyah, and the sites at Chagar Bazar and Tell Brak in the Upper Khabur area (Syria), he was also the first to excavate archaeological sites in the valley of the river Balikh, to the west of the Khabur basin,; in December 1933, he was elected a Fellow of the Society of Antiquaries (FSA).

=== 22 ===
- Jomo Kenyatta, 80 or 81 (date of birth uncertain), Kenyan anti-colonial activist and politician, he served as the first Prime Minister of Kenya from 1963 until 1964, and as the first president of Kenya from 1964 until his death in office in 1978, combining the roles of head of state and head of government, Kenyatta's calls to forgive and forget the past were a keystone of his government, he preserved some elements of the old colonial order, particularly in relation to law and order, the police and military structures were left largely intact, death caused by a heart attack
- Ignazio Silone, 78, Italian politician and writer,he was one of the founders of the Italian Communist Party (PCI), but he wanted to go beyond orthodox communism through federalism and liberal socialism, he had a diatribe with the long-time PCI leader Palmiro Togliatti, he spoke of the weakness of democratic institutions, and his meetings with Carlo Rosselli and the members of Giustizia e Libertà led him to rethink socialism away from Marxism–Leninism, Silone defined himself as a "Christian without church and socialist without party",in the 1990s, the Italian historians Dario Biocca and Mauro Canali found documents which implied that Silone had acted as an informant for the Fascist police from 1919 until 1930,; it is believed that the reason for which Silone broke from the Italian fascist secret police OVRA is that the organization tortured his brother. The two historians published the results of their research in a work titled L'informatore. Silone, i comunisti e la polizia.

=== 24 ===
- Pat Paterson, 68, English-American actress, she portrayed the female lead Carol Arnold in the mystery film Charlie Chan Goes To Egypt (1935), she is better known for marrying her fellow actor Charles Boyer only a few months after first meeting him at a dinner party in 1934,death caused by cancer. Her widowed husband Charles Boyer committed suicide two days after her death.
- Louis Prima, 67, American bandleader, singer, and trumpeter,he is credited as one of the musicians who popularized the genre of jump blues during the late 1940s and the early 1950s,with the genre being a precursor to both rhythm and blues and rock and roll,he voiced the character King Louie in the animated feature film The Jungle Book (1967), though the role was previously intended for Louis Armstrong, Prima himself considered playing King Louie to be one of the highlights of his career, and felt that he had become "immortal" thanks to Walt Disney and his animation studio.

=== 25 ===
- George E. Jonas, 80, American businessman and philanthropist, he was the founder of the Louis August Jonas Foundation and Camp Rising Sun, a full scholarship, international summer camp located in Red Hook, New York,at his death in 1978, he left his fortune to the foundation, intended for the continued operation of the camp.
- Brian Worth, 64, English actor,he portrayed Phillip Morring in the mystery film The Arsenal Stadium Mystery (1939)

=== 26 ===
- Charles Boyer, 78, French-American actor, he was nominated four times for the Academy Award for Best Actor, for his roles as Napoleon Bonaparte in the historical drama film Conquest (1937), Pepe le Moko in the crime drama Algiers (1938),Gregory Anton in the psychological thriller Gaslight (1944),and Cesar in the romantic drama Fanny (1961), the Looney Tunes character Pepé Le Pew was a parody of Boyer in his role as Pépé le Moko,Boyer committed suicide with an overdose of Seconal.
- Steve Gravers, 56, American character actor,he voiced the main antagonist Blackwolf in the animated feature film Wizards (1977), with the physical appearance of his character closely resembling Ivan the Terrible, as depicted in the films of Sergei Eisenstein.
- José Manuel Moreno, 62, Argentine footballer and manager,he was chosen as the best player of the tournament during the 1947 South American Championship, he was known for his formidable heading ability, scoring 75 with his head.

=== 28 ===
- Kofi Abrefa Busia, 65, Ghanaian political leader and academic, he served as the Prime Minister of Ghana from 1969 until 1972, he is credited with restoring civilian government to the country following military rule, but he was overthrown by a military coup in 1972, death caused by a heart attack.
- Bruce Catton, 78, American historian and journalist, with his works focusing primarily on the American Civil War,he won both the 1954 National Book Award for Nonfiction and the 1954 Pulitzer Prize for History. for his history book A Stillness at Appomattox (1953), death caused by a respiratory disease.
- Robert Shaw, 51, English actor and novelist, he was awarded the 1962 Hawthornden Prize for his novel The Sun Doctor (1961),he was nominated for the Academy Award for Best Supporting Actor for his role as Henry VIII in the historical drama film A Man for All Seasons (1966),Shaw achieved his greatest film stardom after playing the shark-obsessed fisherman Quint in the thriller film Jaws (1975), although he was at first reluctant to take the role since he did not like the book, death caused by a heart attack which he suffered while driving from Castlebar to his home in Tourmakeady.Shaw stopped the car, stepped out, then collapsed and lost consciousness on the roadside. He was taken to Castlebar General Hospital, where he was pronounced dead.

=== 29 ===
- Karl Hartl, 79, Austrian film director, following the 1938 Anschluss, he became the head of production for Wien-Film, the newly-created body through which the UFA GmbH, and through it Joseph Goebbels, controlled the Austrian film industry. In this role, which Hartl retained until the end of World War II in Europe, Hartl seldom undertook work on individual films himself, but was nevertheless involved at a senior level with some of the most significant entertainment films of the Nazi period; he was also a member of the Advisory Council (Präsidialrat) of the Reich Chamber of Film; despite Hartl's professional ties to the Nazi regime, Wien-Film made largely propaganda-free entertainment films under Hartl's leadership.

=== 30 ===
- Luigi Vannucchi, 47, Italian actor, he portrayed the suicidal writer Cesare Pavese in the television series Il vizio assurdo (The absurd vice), and he committed suicide soon after playing this final role.
- Geertruida Wijsmuller-Meijer, 82, a prominent member of the Dutch resistance,she maintained regular contacts with various Nazis, which she could ask for favors when needed,; for example, she acquired travel documents for Jewish refugee children through one of her contacts within the Gestapo.

== Sources ==
- Arnold, Guy (1974). Kenyatta and the Politics of Kenya. London: Dent. ISBN 978-0460078788.
- Assensoh, A. B. (1998). African Political Leadership: Jomo Kenyatta, Kwame Nkrumah, and Julius K. Nyerere. Malabar, Florida: Krieger Publishing Company. ISBN 978-0894649110.
- Gertzel, Cherry (1970). The Politics of Independent Kenya. London: Heinemann. ISBN 978-0810103177.
- Hebblethwaite, Peter (1993). Paul VI: The First Modern Pope. Paulist Press. ISBN 978-0-8091-0461-1..
- Kuria, Gibson Kamau (1991). "Confronting Dictatorship in Kenya". Journal of Democracy. 2 (4): 115–126. doi:10.1353/jod.1991.0060. S2CID 154003550.
- Kyle, Keith (1997). "The Politics of the Independence of Kenya". Contemporary British History. 11 (4): 42–65. doi:10.1080/13619469708581458.* Maloba, W. O. (2017). The Anatomy of Neo-Colonialism in Kenya: British Imperialism and Kenyatta, 1963–1978. London: Palgrave Macmillan. ISBN 978-3319509648.
- Murray-Brown, Jeremy (1974) [1972]. Kenyatta. New York City: Fontana. ISBN 978-0006334538.
- Parker, Robert L. 2001. "Chávez (y Ramírez), Carlos (Antonio de Padua)". The New Grove Dictionary of Music and Musicians, 2nd edition, edited by Stanley Sadie and John Tyrrell. London: Macmillan.
- Tamarkin, M. (1979). "From Kenyatta to Moi: The Anatomy of a Peaceful Transition of Power". Africa Today. 26 (3): 21–37. JSTOR 4185874.
- TCM Film Guide (2006). The 50 Most Unforgettable Actors of the Studio Era: Leading Men. San Francisco, California: Chronicle Books.
