= Aces High (film) =

1976 British war film by Jack Gold

- Original British film poster
- Directed by: Jack Gold
- Screenplay by: Howard Barker
- Based on: Journey's End (play) by R. C. Sherriff
- Produced by: Benjamin Fisz; Jacques Roitfeld
- Starring: Malcolm McDowell; Christopher Plummer; Simon Ward; Peter Firth; David Wood; John Gielgud; Trevor Howard; Richard Johnson; Ray Milland
- Cinematography: Gerry Fisher
- Edited by: Anne V. Coates
- Music by: Richard Hartley; Charles Chilton
- Production companies: S. Benjamin Fisz Productions; Jacques Roitfeld (Les Productions)
- Distributed by: EMI Films (UK)
- Release dates: 19 May 1976 (UK); 8 June 1977 (France)
- Running time: 114 minutes
- Countries: United Kingdom; France
- Language: English
- Budget: £1,250,000 or £1.5 million

Aces High is a 1976 war film directed by Jack Gold, starring Malcolm McDowell, Peter Firth, Christopher Plummer and Simon Ward. An Anglo-French production, the film is based on the 1928 play Journey's End by R. C. Sherriff, with additional material from fighter ace Cecil Lewis's memoir, Sagittarius Rising. The screenplay was written by Howard Barker.

Aces High turns the First World War trench warfare of Journey's End into the aerial battles fought in 1917 by the Royal Flying Corps (RFC) above the Western Front. The film covers a week of a squadron where the high death rate puts an enormous strain on the surviving pilots. Many characters and plot lines are loosely based on those of Journey's End: the idealistic new officer who is killed at the end, and whose sister is the girlfriend of his tough but alcoholic commanding officer, the kindly middle-aged second-in-command (known as "Uncle" by the younger officers) who is killed on a dangerous intelligence-gathering mission ordered by the top brass, and the officer whose claims of neuralgia are taken to be cowardice.

== Plot ==
In October 1916, fighter ace John Gresham speaks to the senior class at Eton College, which includes Stephen Croft. Gresham had been his house captain at Eton and is his older sister's boyfriend. To Croft he is a hero to be emulated.

A year later, 2nd Lt. Croft, after much careful arranging and maneuvering, arrives as a replacement at the base in northern France where Gresham is commanding officer. Seeing the excitement the young man has about flying with his hero, Captain "Uncle" Sinclair tells Croft he might find Gresham "changed".

Gresham is conflicted about having a younger man worship him as a hero, for he relies on alcohol to continue being a flying ace – which is something that Croft might report to his older sister back home. In a series of trials by fire, Gresham initiates Croft into the fighter pilot world, shooting down a German fighter on the younger pilot's tail. When Croft writes of his admiration for this heroic feat in a letter to his sister, Gresham waylays the letter, purportedly so he can censor it. Not able to bring himself actually to open the letter, Sinclair reads it to him.

When Sinclair is killed in a photography mission that Croft piloted, Gresham arranges to have him lose his virginity to a young French woman (prostitute) in Amiens. When Croft sneaks back to town the next night to be with her, she is chatting with a French colonel and ignores him.

By the end of the week, Croft shoots down his first plane. He is then suddenly killed in an air-to-air collision with a German aircraft. Back at base, Gresham struggles to write a letter to Croft's older sister, informing her of his death. When the next hopeful group of young replacement pilots enters his office for his review, he sees an apparition of an uninjured, smiling Croft through his office window. After the image fades, Gresham notes the dirtiness of the window to Bennett, before ordering the replacement pilots to grab their gear.

== Cast ==
Names for the equivalent characters in Journey's End are included below in parentheses.

- Malcolm McDowell as Major (Note: shown as a captain in the opening prologue, and as a major in the Western Front scenes set a year later) John Gresham (Capt. Dennis Stanhope)
- Christopher Plummer as Capt. "Uncle" Sinclair (Lt. Osborne)
- Simon Ward as Lieutenant Crawford (2nd Lt. Hibbert)
- Peter Firth as 2nd Lt. Stephen Croft (2nd Lt. Raleigh)
- David Wood as Lieutenant "Tommy" Thompson (2nd Lt. Trotter)
- John Gielgud as Headmaster at Eton
- Trevor Howard as Lieutenant Colonel Silkin
- Richard Johnson as Major Lyle
- Ray Milland as Brigadier General Whale
- Christopher Blake as Lieutenant Roberts
- Gilles Béhat as Beckenaur
- Elliot Cooper as Wade
- David Daker as Mess Corporal Bennett
- Barry Jackson as Corporal Albert Joyce
- Jacques Maury as Ponnelle
- Ron Pember as Lance Corporal Eliot
- Tim Pigott-Smith as Major Stoppard
- Jeanne Patou as French Singer
- Pascale Christophe as Croft's Girlfriend
- Judy Buxton as French Girl
- Penny Irving as French Girl
- Steven Pacey as Officer
- Paul Henley as Replacement

== Production ==
=== Development ===
The idea for the film came from producer Benny Fisz, who had served in the RAF in the Second World War and made such movies as The Battle of Britain. He pitched the idea of remaking Journey's End with an air force background to British director Jack Gold, who had just made The Naked Civil Servant. Although initially wary of it being an aviation film, Gold agreed after Howard Barker revised the screenplay.

Gold said he was attracted to the film because "That was innocence, extreme youth, marred lives of these pilots who knew they are going to die. And we could show not only chivalry and bravery but also the fear." "What interests me is human relationships," said Gold. "Aces High has aerial battle scenes but they're not just thrown in. It has songs but they're not just cue music. They do tell something about the characters." Barker said Fisz's idea had "opened up" Sherriff's play. "You can't set a film entirely in a dugout."

The movie was co-financed by EMI Films. Its production was announced in July 1975 by Nat Cohen of EMI, as part of a slate of films worth £6-7 million. (Others included Whatever Happened to the Likely Lads, a remake of Kind Hearts and Coronets, The Sweeney, Evil Under the Sun, Sergeant Steiner, Spanish Fly, To the Devil a Daughter, The Nat King Cole Story and Seven Nights in Japan. Some of these were not made.)

=== Casting ===
Peter Firth and Christopher Plummer joined Malcolm McDowell, who agreed to appear in the film because Gold had such a good reputation among actors at the time. According to editor Anne Coates, Gold "didn't particularly want McDowell" but the actor had been cast by Benjamin Fisz before Gold joined the project.

=== Filming ===
The shooting schedule took seven weeks with one week for rehearsal. Exteriors were shot in Spain and Southern England with principal photography at Booker Airfield, High Wycombe, Buckinghamshire, as well as St Katharine Docks and Eton College. Interiors were completed at Pinewood Studios. Malcolm McDowell recalls a highlight was when Douglas Bader visited the set.

The production paid close attention to authenticity with First World War–era equipment being used throughout the film such as the airfield facilities, barracks and motor transport. The squadron depicted (known as 76 Squadron) is loosely based on 56 Squadron, which flew the S.E.5 that regained Allied air superiority in mid-1917. Some scenes are based on real RFC stories, such as pilots choosing between jumping to their deaths or burning alive in their aircraft (as they were not issued parachutes). The juvenile mess room songs and young pilots "public school" attitudes capture the fatalistic attitudes of the time, when the life expectancy of a new pilot could be measured in weeks.

==== Aerial sequences ====
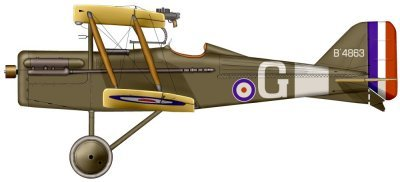
S.E.5a (200 h.p. geared Hispano-Suiza with 4-bladed propeller) of No. 56 Squadron RAF

Although the film reused some aerial sequences from The Blue Max (1966) and Von Richthofen and Brown (1971), the producers shot their own flight scenes. All British S.E.5s were heavily modified Stampe SV.4s, a Belgian two-seat trainer that first flew in the 1930s. Sinclair's plane was a period Avro 504. (Note: The Nieuport 17, which "Uncle" says is the one preferred by Gresham, is actually an S.E.5.)

German aircraft were all adapted post-WWI aircraft except for a replica Fokker E-III Eindecker. The reproduction is seen when it is brought down intact and its pilot given a toast by his British counterparts. Production stills show Malcolm McDowell (Gresham) posing with a Bristol M.1C but this particular plane does not appear in the finished film.

Director Jack Gold later recalled: "It was very difficult to obtain those planes. Sometimes we used models or archive footage. Action sequences in the air were very difficult to make and they were also very much tied with story. I had great assistant in Derek Cracknell and great specialist for special effects."

== Reception ==
The film was not a success at the box office. Malcolm McDowell argued this was in part because it had too much action for a psychological drama but not enough action to be a proper action film.

=== Critical ===
The Sunday Telegraph wrote the film "contains a quarter of young actors whose enormous potential for stardom will, predictably, only be equalled by the inability of British studios to know what to do with it." "A shrill anti-establishment squawk," complained The Observer.

The Guardian called it "a very straight forward epic... if not exactly inspired, is at least handled with great competence and confidence throughout."

The Evening Standard felt the movie was "predictably good in the sky" but when it came to "asking for insight into the hearts and minds of the boy pilots of the Royal Flying Corps, it'll be a deep disappointment."

Film historian Michael Paris saw Aces High as another of the period films that attempted to "de-mystologise" warfare. Film archivist and historian Stephen Pendo saw the "good aerial photography by Gerry Fisher" as the strength of a film that played more as "standard fare".

Howard Barker later said the film's "theme reveals in comic clarity the absurdity of producer-power in an artistic enterprise. It involved converting Journey's End into a flying film. Of course all the power that play possessed — and it’s not a play I like — was instantly dissipated, and you were left with a lot of public schoolboys flying over Surrey."

Anne Coates who edited felt that the movie did not work due to miscasting, particularly McDowell who "was completely wrong for the character... this should have been a, you know, a young, heroic, First World War, British" type.

Filmink argued "Journey’s End didn’t translate to the sky, at least not in this version with these stars... and this director... ; 1938’s Dawn Patrol is far better."

== US release ==
The film was not shown in US cinemas. HBO premiered it in 1979.

== Legacy ==
Howard Barker mentioned the film in a 2017 interview, joking "Was there ever a more ill-conceived project?” but adding, "I wouldn’t be in this house if I hadn’t written that. Never made any money out of the theatre.”

The song "Aces High" by Iron Maiden is titled after and inspired by the film, although it is set during the Second World War, whereas the film takes place in the First World War. Iron Maiden frequently name songs after war films.

During the aerial sequence, the Blackadder Goes Forth episode "Private Plane" reuses scenes from Aces High.
