= Siegfried Charoux =

British artist

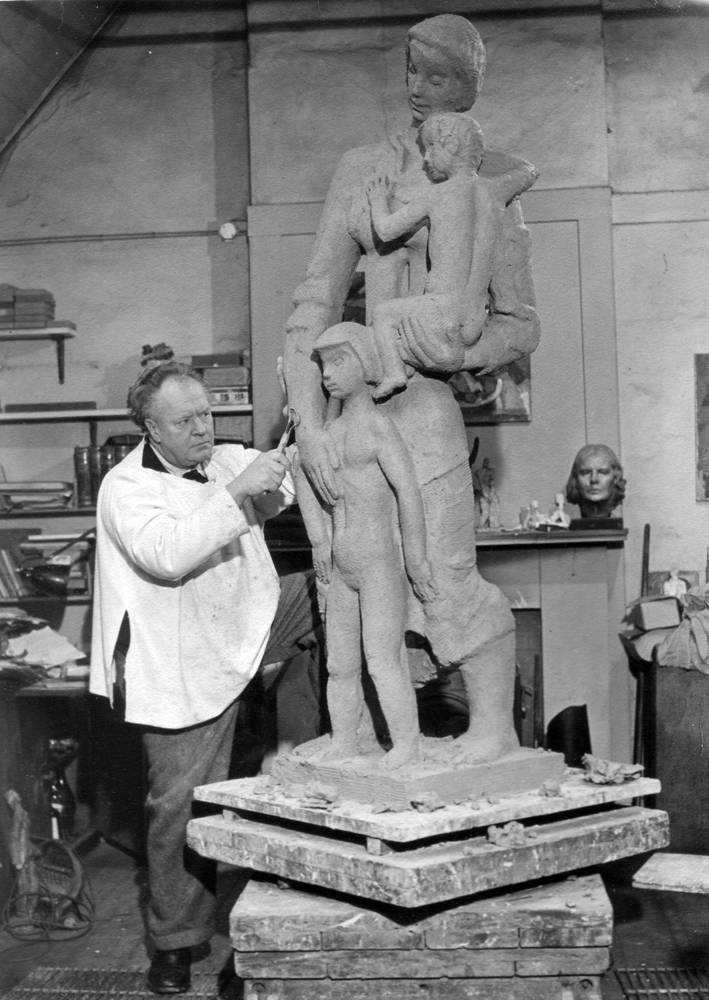
Charoux in his studio, c.1960, working on his Mother and Children, now in Penzing

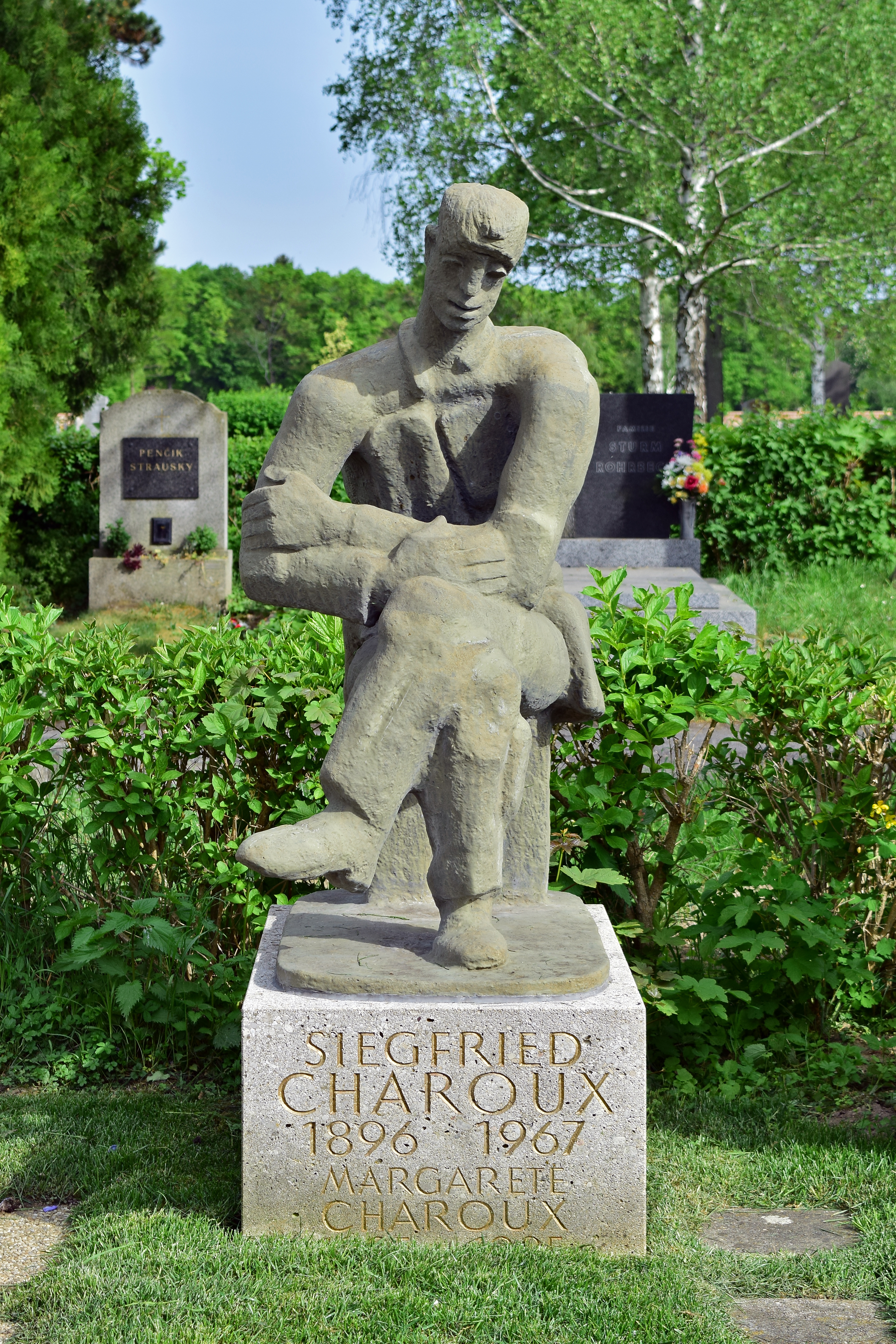
Memorial to Charoux at Vienna's Central Cemetery (Zentralfriedhof)

Siegfried Joseph Charoux (15 November 1896 – 26 April 1967) was an artist, primarily a figurative sculptor working in bronze, stone, or terracotta. Born in Austria, he moved to England in 1935, where he became naturalised in 1946.

== Early and private life ==
Charoux was born in Vienna. His father Josef Kinich was a civil engineer who had served in the Austro-Hungarian Army. His mother Anna Buchta (née Charous) was a dressmaker. She had Czech ancestry, and was the widow of Johann Buchta. He was given the name Siegfried Buchta at birth, and changed his name to Siegfried Charous in 1914 after his mother's maiden name. Later, as a political gesture and a derivative of Chat Roux (Red Cat) he changed the spelling of his surname to Charoux in 1926, at the time of his marriage to Margarethe Treibl (1895 - 1985). They had no children. Margarethe was in international textile trader who traveled extensively and introduced Charoux's sculptures to many of the countries in which she traded.

Charoux attended schools in Vienna, and was conscripted into the Austro-Hungarian Army in early 1915. His right hand was wounded in the First World War, with nerve damage causing paralysis, and he left the army due to his wounds in 1917. He regained use of his right arm after a successful surgical operation.

== Career in Vienna ==
He studied privately under Josef Heu. He was rejected by the Vienna School of Applied Arts (Hochschule für angewandte Kunst), but attended the Vienna Academy (Akademie der Bildenden Künste), under Hans Bitterlich, from 1922 to 1924.

He was a political cartoonist from about 1923 to about 1933, using the pseudonym "Chat Roux". His cartoons were published in the Arbeiter-Zeitung and other left-wing journals. He shifted to sculpture, opening his own studio in 1926, and made memorials in Vienna to Robert Blum (1927) and Matteotti (1929). In 1930 he won an international competition to create a memorial statue to Gotthold Ephraim Lessing, erected in Judenplatz in 1935. The statue was removed by the Third Reich after 1939 and destroyed. After the Second World War, Charoux was commissioned to replace the lost memorial with a bronze copy, which was unveiled in 1968, the year after his death, at Morzinplatz in Vienna. It was moved back to Judenplatz in 1981.

== Career in England ==
Life became difficult for Charoux in Austria due to his left-wing political views, and he moved to England in September 1935. He was interned on the Isle of Man as an enemy alien during the Second World War, but became naturalized as a British subject in November 1946.

He made a memorial bust of Amy Johnson in 1944, displayed at the Ferens Art Gallery in Hull. He did stone carvings for the School of Anatomy and the Engineering Laboratory at Cambridge University in 1948. His work was also part of the sculpture event in the art competition at the 1948 Summer Olympics.

His terracotta statue Youth: Standing Boy (1948) - built using an Etruscan technique in layers without an armature - was bought by the Tate Gallery in 1948, using funds from the Chantrey Bequest. Charoux's style altered dramatically when he created The Pedestrian (1951) which acknowledged an early influence of American culture in post-war London. The Tate also holds his statue of Civilisation: The Judge (1962), made for the Royal Courts of Justice in the Strand as part of a series of six sculptures, the others including Cellist for the Royal Festival Hall, Motor Cyclist for the Shell Building on the South Bank, Violinist, and Survivor. He also contributed to open-air exhibitions of sculptures held at Battersea Park in 1948, 1951, 1954, and 1960, and at Holland Park in 1957. He also exhibited watercolours at the Piccadilly Gallery in 1958.

His monumental relief work in concrete, The Islanders, depicting three figures, man woman and child, was exhibited at the Festival of Britain in 1951 as part of the Sea and Ships Pavilion designed by Basil Spence, but it was destroyed after the exhibition closed. He also made nine monumental figures, 8 feet (2.4 m) tall, embodying Manual and Spiritual Labour, for the new Salters' Hall, also designed by Basil Spence. He created his sculpture The Neighbours for the Quadrant Estate in Highbury (1959) and his sculpture Man for the South Bank in 1960. Perhaps the most significant works that Charoux created were those for his Civilisation Cyclus portraying studies of everyday Londoners.

He was elected as an Associate of the Royal Academy (ARA) in 1949, and became a full member in 1956. He won the Vienna city prize for sculpture in 1948, and became an honorary professor of the Republic of Austria in 1958. He was awarded the Gold medal of the city of Vienna in 1966.

He died at Manor House Hospital in Hendon. His remains were cremated at Golders Green crematorium, and the ashes deposited at Sulz im Wienerwald, then moved to the Vienna's Central Cemetery, the Wiener Zentralfriedhof, in 1977.
