= Raymond Harold Sawkins =

British novelist (1923–2006)

Raymond Harold Sawkins (14 July 1923 – 23 August 2006) was a British novelist, who mainly published under the pseudonym Colin Forbes, but also as Richard Raine, Jay Bernard and Harold English. He published only three of his first books under his own name.

Sawkins wrote over 40 books, mostly as Colin Forbes. He was famous for his long-running series of thriller novels in which the principal character is Tweed, Deputy Director of the Secret Intelligence Service.

== Life ==
Born in Hampstead, London, Sawkins attended The Lower School of John Lyon in Harrow, London. At the age of 16 he started work as a sub-editor with a magazine and book publishing company. He served with the British Army in North Africa and the Middle East during World War II. Before his demobilisation he was attached to the Army Newspaper Unit in Rome. On his return to civilian life he joined a publishing and printing company, commuting to London for 20 years, until he became successful enough to be a full-time novelist.

Sawkins was married to a Scots-Canadian, Jane Robertson (born 31 March 1925, died 1993). Together they had one daughter, Janet.

Sawkins died of a heart attack on 23 August 2006.

The Royal Society for the Protection of Birds (RSPB) received £3.5 million as the sole beneficiary of Sawkins' estate following his death. This is the largest legacy ever received by the RSPB.

== Work ==
His first book, Snow on High Ground, was written under his own name in 1966. Two more books in the Snow series were also published under his own name. Over the next few years Sawkins experimented with books under three pseudonyms: Richard Raine, Colin Forbes, and Jay Bernard (though the latter is not to be confused with the UK poet). Tramp in Armour was the first book published as Colin Forbes, in 1969. All subsequent books, apart from The Burning Fuse and The Heavens Above Us (only published in German, as In letzter Minute), he wrote as Forbes.

Sawkins later distanced himself from his early books, choosing to refer to Tramp in Armour as his first novel.

Sawkins was often quoted as personally visiting every location he features in his books to aid the authenticity of the writing. As a result, there is detailed description of the places where the action in his books takes place.

A common thread in his later work was the incorporation of climatic conditions, especially fog. His works are also notable for his frequent inclusion of a prologue and epilogue.

One of his manuscripts, The Heavens Above Us, was published only in German, under the title In letzter Minute. The two first releases, in 1979 and 1981, were under the pseudonym Harold English, but in 2002 it was re-released under the Colin Forbes name.

Fury (1995) was inspired by the courage of his wife before she died, and he set it apart from his other novels "because of the strong emotion and sense of loss that runs through it".

Just one of Forbes's novels was made into a film: Avalanche Express, directed by Mark Robson and starring Lee Marvin and Robert Shaw, which was released in 1979 to generally poor reviews.

His last book, The Savage Gorge, was published posthumously in November 2006.

== Bibliography ==
=== as Raymond Sawkins ===
- Snow series:
  1. Snow on High Ground (1966)
  2. Snow in Paradise (1967)
  3. Snow Along The Border (1968)

=== as Richard Raine ===
- David Martini series:
  1. A Wreath for America (1967) (published in the United States as The Corder Index)
  2. Night of the Hawk (1968)
  3. Bombshell (1969)

=== as Jay Bernard ===
- The Burning Fuse (1970)

=== as Colin Forbes ===
- Tramp In Armour (1969)
- The Heights of Zervos (1970)
- The Palermo Ambush (1972)
- Target 5 (1973)
- The Year of the Golden Ape (1974)
- The Stone Leopard (1975)
- Avalanche Express (1976)
- The Stockholm Syndicate (1981)
- The Leader and the Damned (1983)
- Cross of Fire (1992)
- Tweed & Co. series:
  1. Double Jeopardy (1982)
  2. Terminal (1984)
  3. Cover Story (1985)
  4. The Janus Man (1987)
  5. Deadlock (1988)
  6. The Greek Key (1989)
  7. Shockwave (1990)
  8. Whirlpool (1991)
  9. Cross of Fire (1992)
  10. By Stealth (1992)
  11. The Power (1994)
  12. Fury (1995)
  13. Precipice (1995)
  14. The Cauldron (1997)
  15. The Sisterhood (1998)
  16. This United State (1998)
  17. Sinister Tide (1999)
  18. Rhinoceros (2000)
  19. The Vorpal Blade (2001)
  20. The Cell (2002)
  21. No Mercy (2003)
  22. Blood Storm (2004)
  23. The Main Chance (2005)
  24. The Savage Gorge (2006). Published posthumously

=== as Harold English ===
- In letzter Minute (English script title: The Heavens Above Us) (1979)
