= Derek Wood (author) =

British writer

Derek Wood (1930 – 2 May 2003) was the author of Jane's World Aircraft Recognition Handbook. Wood was the editor of "Jane's" the publishers of a wide range of military handbooks and weekly defence newsletters until he retired in 1993.

== Royal Observer Corps ==
A lifelong and keen aircraft spotter, Derek was a spare time volunteer member of the Royal Observer Corps for nearly fifty years and wrote the history of the Corps in his 1975 book Attack Warning Red : The Royal Observer Corps and the Defence of Britain, 1925 to 1975, later updated in 1992 when the Corps was stood down. Derek joined the Royal Observer Corps in 1947 and served on posts near Chichester, London, and at Cuckfield (north of Brighton) after moving there in the 1960s. As a journalist and aerospace expert he did his utmost to further the Corps' standing in both military and civil areas.

In the late 50s, the aircraft reporting role was being phased out and the ROC became the field force of the UKWMO run by the Home Office. In the Sixties the Home Office was quietly planning to sever the Corps' link with the RAF, take it out of uniform, and completely integrate it within UKWMO. Derek got wind of this and, as aviation correspondent of the Sunday Telegraph, wrote an article warning that if such a plan was implemented it was likely that at least 80 percent of Corps would resign.

The Home Office was furious and demanded that the Commandant, Air Commodore Gresswell, remove Derek from the Corps immediately. Fortunately, Gresswell refused to do so. The plan was quietly dropped and Derek went on to serve the Corps for many more years.

Besides running the Post at Cuckfield as Chief Observer, he was much in demand on the lecture circuit and gave talks to the RAF Staff College at Bracknell, the Royal Aeronautical Society and the Society of British Aerospace Companies, as well as ROC Groups and Cluster meetings, all over the country.

== Author ==
Derek Wood came into prominence as an author when his book The Narrow Margin, regarded as the definitive history of the Battle of Britain, was published. He was an adviser on the set of the eponymous film, and the book is used by military historians and lecturers to this day. Others of his books include Project Cancelled, an account of Britain's abandoned aircraft projects, Jane's World Aircraft Recognition Handbook and, of course, Attack Warning Red, the official history of the Royal Observer Corps.

He started preparing to write the history of the ROC way back in 1972 and when Attack Warning Red was published in 1976, and its update in 1991 when the Corps stood down, he put its achievement on permanent record. In 1983, Derek started the magazine called Jane's Defence Weekly, and retired in 1993.

== Books ==
Wood's most famous and successful military book was The Narrow Margin on which the major feature film Battle of Britain was based.
