= Mauro Canali =

Italian historian

Mauro Canali is a full professor of contemporary history at the University of Camerino in Italy. He is considered to be one of the most important scholars of the events leading to the crisis of the liberal Italian state and the rise of fascism. He has also researched and published extensively on the totalitarian structure of Mussolini's regime, its repressive mechanisms and its system of informants. He studied under Renzo De Felice, and has published in the Journal of Modern Italian Studies, the Italian dailies la Repubblica and Cronache di Liberal.

== Career ==
Canali has participated in conferences and held seminars at European and American universities including the University of Copenhagen, University of Gothenburg, University of Barcelona, Harvard University, Brown University and the University of Massachusetts. From October through December 2006 he was a visiting scholar at Harvard University. He is frequently asked to contribute to and appear in history-related programs and documentaries on Italian TV such as "La Storia siamo noi", and is on the board of Rai Storia, the network's history channel. He consults for the program Res Gestae - persone, ricorrenze, eventi - an almanac of historical figures and events with a daily commentary called "100 seconds" that focuses on the most important historical events of the day.

=== L'informatore. Silone i comunisti e la polizia ===
His book, L'informatore. Silone i comunisti e la polizia, (coauthored with Dario Biocca), which bolstered the thesis of the collaboration between the well-known Abruzzi author Ignazio Silone and the Fascist political police during the 1920s, was the subject of much debate among historians in Italy and abroad. It was discussed in publications including New Left Review, The New Yorker, and The Nation.

== Honors and awards ==
In 1998 Canali was awarded the Walter Tobagi Prize for his book Il delitto Matteotti. Affarismo e politica nel primo governo Mussolini. He was awarded the Bruno Buozzi Prize in 2005 for:

...having contributed, with his book "Le spie del regime," to a deeper understanding of one of the most disturbing and unknown aspects of the Fascist period in Italy. His book is the culmination of deeply felt and highly accurate research, based on reliable and at times unpublished documents that have spurned the reopening of the debate on the historical truth behind events whose importance had remained under-estimated...

In 2010 ANPI awarded him with the Premio Renato Benedetto Fabrizi. In 2014, Canali was awarded the Premio Internazionale Capalbio for his book Il tradimento. Gramsci Togliatti e la verità negata.

In 2017, he was awarded the Premio Fiuggi/Storia for his book La scoperta dell'Italia. Il fascismo raccontato dai corrispondenti americani. He is now Advisor of the American Academy in Roma.

== Publications ==
- The Matteotti Murder and Mussolini, Palgrave Macmillan, 2024
- La prima trasvolata atlantica in solitaria - RCS MediaGroup Corriere della Sera - 2021
- Dalle Alpi al Deserto Libico. I diari di Rodolfo Graziani 1940-1941 - Nuova Argos - 2021.
- All Bliss in Fiume. L'opinione pubblica statunitense di fronte all'impresa, in Fiume 1919-1920. Uno sguardo internazionale, Memoria e Ricerca. Rivista di Storia Contemporanea, n.3, settembre-dicembre 2020, Bologna, Il Mulino.
- Il delitto Matteotti, Milano, RCS - Corriere della Sera, 2020.
- La guerra di Etiopia e i corrispondenti di guerra americani, in Correspondants de guerre 1918-1939 Maroc - Ethiopie - Espagne, Presses Universitaires Savoie Mont Blanc Laboratoire LLSETI, 2020.
- Mussolini e i ladri di regime. Gli arricchimenti illeciti del fascismo (con Clemente Volpini) - Mondadori - 2019
- La scoperta dell'Italia. Il fascismo raccontato dai corrispondenti americani - Marsilio Editori - 2017 (Premio Fiuggi/Storia 2017)
- Il tradimento. Gramsci Togliatti e la verità negata - Marsilio Editori - 2013 (Premio Internazionale Capalbio 2014)
- Il revisionismo storico e il fascismo, in Cercles. Revista de Historia Cultural - Publicacions i Edicions Universitat de Barcelona - 2011
- Mussolini and His Myths, in Sinnverlust und Sinnfindung am Anfang des 20. Jahrhunderts a.c. Karin Wolgast - Konigshausen & Neumann - 2011
- Il problema dell'Altro nei regimi totalitari. Il caso del fascismo, in Cittadinanza, identità e diritti a.c. Giulio M. Salerno e Francesco Rimoli - EUM - 2011
- Crime and Repression, in Oxford Handbook of Fascism a.c. Richard J. B. Bosworth - Oxford University Press - 2009
- Matteotti Murder and the Origins of Mussolini's Totalitarian Fascist Regime in Italy, in Journal of Modern Italian Studies - 2009 vol. 14
- Repressione e consenso nell'esperimento fascista, in Modernità totalitaria. Il fascismo italiano a.c. di Emilio Gentile - Editori Laterza - 2008
- Guidonia e il regime fascista. Una 'città nuova' dagli anni del consenso alla guerra (1935-1945), in Innamorarsi del futuro. Guidonia Montecelio 1937-2007, Ancona, 2007.
- Mussolini e il petrolio iracheno. L'Italia, gli interessi petroliferi e le grandi potenze - Einaudi - 2007
- Il delitto Matteotti - Il Mulino - 1997, 2004, 2015.
- Ignazio Silone and the Fascist political police, in Journal of Modern Italian Studies - 2001 vol.5
- Il caso Silone. Le prove del doppio gioco - I libri della Fondazione Liberal - 2000
- Le spie del regime - Il Mulino - 2004
- (con Dario Biocca), L' informatore: Silone, i comunisti e la polizia - Luni Editrice - 2000
- Il dissidentismo fascista. Pisa e il caso Santini 1923-1925 - Bonacci - 1983
- Il delitto Matteotti. Affarismo e politica nel primo governo Mussolini - Il Mulino - 1997
- Cesare Rossi. Da rivoluzionario a eminenza grigia del fascismo - Il Mulino - 1991
