= A Town Called Bastard =

1971 film by Irving Lerner, Robert Parrish

A Town Called Bastard (or: A Town Called Hell)
- Directed by: Robert Parrish
- Written by: Richard Aubrey
- Produced by: Benjamin Fisz
- Starring: Robert Shaw; Telly Savalas; Stella Stevens; Martin Landau; Fernando Rey; Al Lettieri
- Cinematography: Manuel Berenguer
- Music by: Waldo de los Rios
- Production companies: Benmar Productions; Zurbano Films
- Distributed by: Scotia International (USA)
- Release date: 1971
- Running time: 95 minutes
- Countries: United Kingdom; Spain
- Language: English
- Budget: £1 million

A Town Called Bastard (also known as A Town Called Hell on DVD and Blu-ray) is a 1971 international co-production spaghetti Western. It was shot in Madrid with Robert Shaw, Telly Savalas, Stella Stevens and Martin Landau.

It was released on blu-ray on 18 August 2015. The film was retitled A Town Called Hell for US release as the word "bastard" was thought offensive.

== Plot ==
In 1905 Mexico, a small town is presided over by a tyrant who commands a grizzled outlaw and his men. Also in town is a priest with a violent past, who has abandoned his clerical duties.

A widow arrives with her faithful servant promising to pay $20,000 in gold if the man who killed her husband is found and delivered to her. Further violence erupts when a brutal army colonel arrives on the scene searching for an elusive rebel leader. The colonel and the priest knew each other years before.

== Cast ==
- Robert Shaw as The Priest
- Telly Savalas as Don Carlos
- Stella Stevens as Alvira
- Martin Landau as The Colonel
- Fernando Rey as old blind man
- Al Lettieri as La Bomba
- Michael Craig as Paco
- Dudley Sutton as Spectre
- Paloma Cela as Paloma
- Aldo Sambrell as Calebra
- Maribel Hidalgo as La Perla
- Cass Martin as Jose
- Antonio Mayans as Manuel
- Francisco Marsó as Julio
- John Clark as Quiet American
- Luis Rivera as Paco
- Howard Hagan as American #1
- Vicente Soler as Priest #1
- Tito García as Malhombre
- Elizabeth Sands as Carmina
- Sansona Siglo XX as Tortilla woman
- George Rigaud as Gato Asilla
- Tony Cyrus as Sanchez
- Nilda Álvarez as Old mother
- José Espinosa as Chomoco
- James O'Rourke as Sergeant
- Adolfo Thous as Mendoza
- Robert Rietty as Paco
- Ángel Blanco as Young boy
- Charly Bravo as Juan
- Bruce M. Fischer as Miguel
- Cris Huerta as Gonzales
- William Layton
- Felipe Solano as Eduardo
- Tony Vogel as Man

== Production ==
The film was financed by Benmar, a wholly owned filmmaking subsidiary of Scotia Investments, the leisure activities group. Benmar was headed by Benjamin Fisz in association with Boris Marmor. They had just invested in Royal Hunt of the Sun. Scotia purchased Benmar and a number of other companies from Marmor in June 1969.

Benmar teamed with writer-producer Philip Yordan who had made several films in Spain. Fisz, Marmour and Yordan built a Western street in Spain that was to be used for the film. Fisz hired Robert Adrey to write the script and, according to Bernard Gordon, who often worked for Yordan, "Yordan was supposed to rewrite and cure its problems." (Gordon described the script as "a bloody, violent, and confusing exercise that, presumably, catered to the booming desire for more and more sensational films.")

Filming began in Spain in July 1970. Howard Brandy was Fisz's assistant. Production partly took place at a Mexican fortress set built at Madrid 70 Studios near Daganzo created by Yordan. This street would be later used by Captain Apache, Bad Man's River, Pancho Villa, and Horror Express.

Bernard Gordon says when he saw the first cut of the film "We all agreed it didn't make sense and that production would have to be reopened. Again, I realized this was a commonplace with Yordan. Finish a film inadequately, then worry about making changes when it was, in effect, too late. Strangle a production with too little money, then spend a great deal more than was saved on fixing up." Gordon wrote additional scenes which were shot by Irving Lerner.

The film was not a box office success. In October 1970 Benmar announced they would follow Bastard with ten projects (Captain Apache, They All Came to Kill, Hideout, How to Become a Vampire, Journey Man, Big Blonde, The Tribe that Lost Its Head, Her Private's We, Blood Hunt Mafiosa and Trafalfa), but only Captain Apache was made.

In April 1972 Scotia sold off the rights to five of its pictures, including Bastard, Psychomania, Captain Apache and Bad Man's River.

== Reception ==
Kine Weekly said "Story, based on fact, powerful, violent and brutal, but in character, direction brooding, cast excellent. Very strong X attraction."

== Notes ==
- Gordon, Bernard (1999). Hollywood exile, or, How I learned to love the blacklist : a memoir. University of Texas Press. ISBN 9780292728271.
