= A Card from Morocco =

1969 novel by Robert Shaw

- First edition (UK)
- Author: Robert Shaw
- Cover artist: Val Biro
- Language: English
- Publisher: Chatto & Windus (UK); Harcourt Brace (US)
- Publication date: 1969
- Publication place: United Kingdom
- Media type: Print (Hardback & Paperback)
- Pages: 182 pp
- ISBN: 0-7011-1475-4
- OCLC: 27556
- Dewey Decimal: 823/.9/14
- LC Class: PZ4.S536 Car3 PR6009.H39
- Preceded by: The Man in the Glass Booth

A Card from Morocco is a novel written by author and actor Robert Shaw. It was published in 1969. A Card from Morocco was the final novel in a trilogy, having been preceded by The Flag (1965) and The Man in the Glass Booth (1967). It concerns Arthur Lewis and Patrick Slattery, two drinking companions self-exiled from society, and their various misadventures through Spain as they both engage in bragging and self destructive behavior.

== Reception ==
A review in Kirkus thought that Shaw had "created as persuasively interesting a pair of drunks as ever staggered across a printed page." Writing for The New York Times, Guy Davenport felt that the author's "skill as a novelist is evident in his giving himself minimal advantages and an elegantly closed system with which he has nevertheless constructed a tense, sharply-controlled story."
