= The Neighbours =

Sculpture by Siegfried Charoux

Coordinates: 51°33′31″N 0°05′37″W

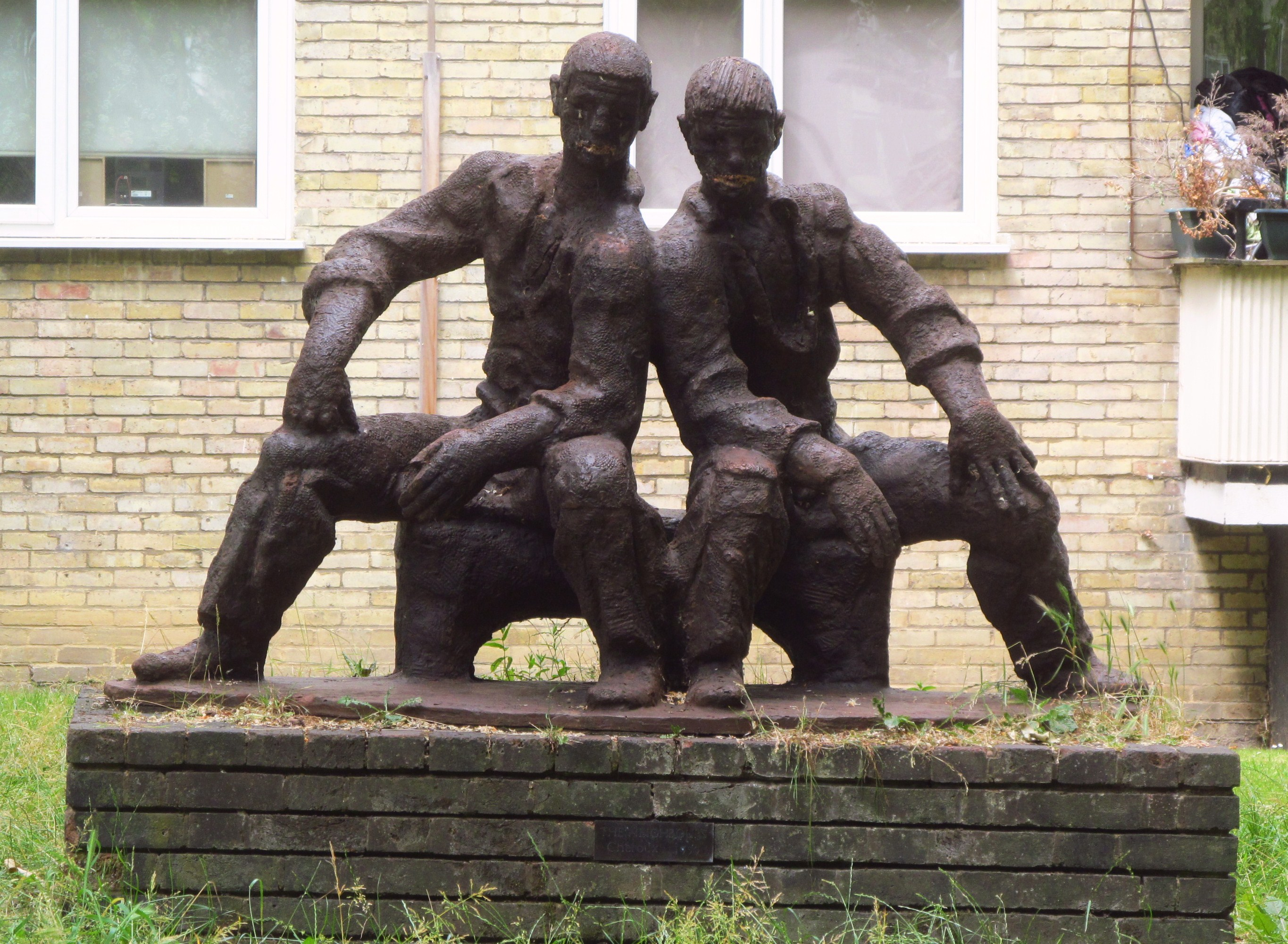
The Neighbours

The Neighbours is a sculpture by Siegfried Charoux. It was commissioned in 1957 using funds set aside by London County Council for public art in its housing projects and unveiled in 1959 at the Quadrant Estate in Islington, N5, London, near Clissold Park. It became Grade II listed building in April 1998.

The sculpture stands approximately 4 feet (1.2 m) high, on a low brick plinth. It depicts two life-size human figures, possibly intended to represent working men, sitting alongside each other on a bench. It was made using synthetic resin mixed with powdered stones, supported by a steel armature and fibreglass matting, creating an appearance similar to terracotta or cemented iron. It was renovated in 2009, in time for the 50th anniversary of its unveiling.

A 7 inches (180 mm) bronze maquette was sold for £2,250 by Christie's in 2011.
