= Cato Street =

Play by Robert Shaw

Cato Street is a play by the British actor and writer Robert Shaw.

The play's subject matter is the Cato Street Conspiracy of 1820. It was first produced in London in November 1971 at the Young Vic, with a cast including Vanessa Redgrave, John Arnatt, James Hazeldine, Bob Hoskins, George Innes, Malcolm Tierney and Norman Beaton.
