= The Janus Man =

1987 novel by Colin Forbes

- First edition
- Author: Colin Forbes
- Language: English
- Genre: Thriller
- Publisher: Collins
- Publication date: 1987
- Publication place: United Kingdom
- Media type: Print Paperback)
- Pages: 461
- ISBN: 0-15-146160-0
- OCLC: 17105836
- Dewey Decimal: 823/.914 19
- LC Class: PR6069.A94 J36 1988

The Janus Man is a 1987 thriller novel by British novelist Raymond Harold Sawkins, written under the pseudonym of Colin Forbes. The book is set in the period it was written, and concerns Soviet infiltration into the Secret Intelligence Service during the Cold War. The book is the fourth of twenty-four books written by Sawkins under Colin Forbes in the "Tweed and Co." series. Forbes published one edition of the "Tweed and Co." series almost every year from 1982 until his death in 2006 (there were no new novels released in 1983, 1986, 1993 or 1996).

The story concerns treason and the rooting out of a traitor and double agent among members of the Secret Intelligence Service, also known as the SIS or MI6. The protagonist is a man known as Tweed, and the book follows his efforts to investigate the clumsily disguised murder of colleague Ian Fergusson, dubbed an "accident" by authorities, whilst in Hamburg, Germany, and the reasons for his killing. Circumstances lead him to believe that the only way the enemy (the Soviet Union) could have intercepted Ferguson on his mission would have been to have a double agent stationed within the SIS. As he attempts to discover the identity of "The Janus Man who faces both East and West", he tracks sources of information in Moscow, Lübeck, Copenhagen and Oslo to hunt down the killer of Ferguson.

The book confronts several issues facing both Britain and the Soviet Union at the time, such as treason and the inability to trust even friends in times of uncertainty and war. People living at the time were also mentioned in the book, such as former U.S. President Ronald Reagan and Soviet leader Mikhail Gorbachev.

It was well received by critics, and was praised by publications such as the Sunday Mirror.
