= The Man in the Glass Booth =

1975 film by Arthur Hiller

- Original film poster
- Directed by: Arthur Hiller
- Screenplay by: Edward Anhalt
- Based on: The Man in the Glass Booth (1968 play) by Robert Shaw; (1967 novel) by Robert Shaw
- Produced by: Ely Landau
- Starring: Maximilian Schell; Lois Nettleton; Lawrence Pressman
- Cinematography: Sam Leavitt
- Edited by: David Bretherton
- Production companies: American Express Film; Ely Landau Organization; Cinevision
- Distributed by: American Film Theatre
- Release date: January 27, 1975
- Running time: 117 minutes
- Country: United States
- Language: English

The Man in the Glass Booth is a 1975 American drama film directed by Arthur Hiller and starring Maximilian Schell, Lois Nettleton and Lawrence Pressman. The screenplay was adapted from Robert Shaw's 1967 novel and 1968 stage play, both of the same name. The film was produced and released as part of the American Film Theatre, which adapted theatrical works for a subscription cinema series.

The plot was inspired by the kidnapping and trial of the German Nazi SS-Obersturmbannführer Adolf Eichmann, who was one of the major organizers of the Holocaust. It centers on Arthur Goldman (Schell), a wealthy Jewish American businessman who is accused of being a fugitive Nazi war criminal, and taken to Jerusalem to face trial for genocide.

The film was released on January 27, 1975. Schell was nominated for an Academy Award and a Golden Globe Award for Best Actor for his performance. Edward Anhalt's screenplay was nominated for a Writers Guild of America Award for Best Adapted Screenplay.

== Plot ==
Arthur Goldman is Jewish and a Nazi death camp survivor. Now a rich industrialist, he lives in luxury in a Manhattan high-rise. He banters with his assistant Charlie, often shocking him with his outrageousness and irreverence about aspects of Jewish life. One day, Israeli Mossad agents kidnap Goldman and take him to Israel for trial on charges of being a Nazi war criminal. Goldman's trial forces his accusers to face not only his presumed guilt, but theirs as well.

At the end, it appears that Goldman is neither a Nazi nor a war criminal after all; he falsified the dental records which the Israelis used to identify him to bring about the trial. When the deception is revealed by the Israeli prosecutor, Goldman is left standing in the trial court's bulletproof glass box, a broken man. The stress shatters his mental health and he becomes catatonic. He then relives in his mind a Nazi firing squad execution and dies as those in the courtroom whisper the Jewish prayer, "Sh'ma Yis'ra'eil Adonai Eloheinu Adonai echad" ("Hear, O Israel: The LORD is our God, the LORD is one"). He is posed inside the glass box unmistakably as Christ was on the cross.

== Cast ==
Credits from the AFI Catalog of Feature Films:

- Maximilian Schell as Arthur Goldman
- Lois Nettleton as Miriam Rosen
- Lawrence Pressman as Charlie Cohn
- Luther Adler as Presiding Judge
- Lloyd Bochner as Dr. Churchill
- Robert H. Harris as Dr. Weisburger
- Henry Brown as Jack
- Norbert Schiller as Dr. Schmidt
- Berry Kroeger as Joachim Berger
- Leonardo Cimino as Dr. Alvarez
- Connie Sawyer as Mrs. Levi
- Leonidas Ossettynski as Samuel Weinberg
- David Nash as Rami
- Martin Berman as Uri
- Richard Rasof as Moshe
- Sy Kramer as Rudin
- Allyson Ames as Alita Poe
- Laura Campbell as Gwen Purfield
- Jennifer Lee as Lauren Shavelson
- Jackie Stolof as Lady Bea Jutland
- Diana Walker as Doretta O'Reilly

== Original play ==
The Man in the Glass Booth
- Original language: English
- Written by: Robert Shaw
- Subject: The trial of an alleged Nazi war criminal
- Genre: Drama

Premiere
- Date: July 27, 1968
- Place: St Martin's Theatre, London

The Man in the Glass Booth was originally a novel and then stage play by Shaw. The novel was the second in a trilogy of novels, preceded by The Flag (1965), and followed by A Card from Morocco (1969).

The original production was directed by Harold Pinter and starred Donald Pleasence and Lawrence Pressman. It opened on the West End in London at the St. Martin's Theatre in July 1967, before opening on Broadway at the Royal Theatre in September 1968. Pleasence and Pressman both reprised their West End roles on Broadway and Pressman eventually became the only actor to reprise his role on film.

The Broadway production was nominated for three Tony Awards - Best Play, Best Direction of a Play, and Best Actor in a Play (for Pleasence). Pleasence won a Drama Desk Award for his performance.

== Production ==
=== Writing ===
While The Man in the Glass Booth was being developed for the screen, Shaw disapproved of the screenplay and had his name removed from the credits. Shaw viewed the completed film before its release and asked to have his name reinstated. In 2002, director Arthur Hiller related Shaw's objection to the screenplay and his change of heart,

When we decided that we needed more emotions in the film and leaned it towards that, we tried, obviously, to be honest to Robert Shaw, to keep that intellectual game-playing, but to create more of an emotional environment. And Robert Shaw became very disturbed. He did not like the idea and indeed, if you will watch the film, you will see that his name does not appear in the credits, nor does it even say, "based on the play, The Man in the Glass Booth" because he wouldn't let us do it. He just didn't like the idea until he saw the film. Then he phoned Eddie Anhalt, the screenwriter, and congratulated him because he thought it was—just kept the tone he wanted and did it so well. And he phoned Mort Abrahams the Executive Producer to see if he could get his name put on the final credits. But it was too late to restore his name, all the prints were all made.

=== Filming ===
The film was shot for $1 million, with 10 days of rehearsals and 23 days of filming in the summer of 1974. The exteriors of Goldman's penthouse were filmed atop the Crown Building in New York City, where the roof of the building was dressed to look like a balcony and garden. Interiors were filmed at the 20th Century Fox Studios in Century City, California.

== Release ==
=== Home video ===
The film was released as a region 1 DVD in 2003 and again in 2008. A Blu-ray version was released in the US in 2017.

== Reception ==
=== Critical response ===
Roger Ebert wrote "Arthur Hiller's film for the AFT is a very good one, although it suffers from one basic problem. By its very nature, film tends to be a realistic medium, photographing the outsides of real world. Robert Shaw's play, even as adapted and made somewhat more realistic by Edward Anhalt, is nevertheless a symbolic and mannered one". Raymond Benson wrote in 2009, "The film is a riveting, first-rate drama featuring an Oscar-nominated, tour-de-force performance by Schell".

=== Awards and nominations ===
Award	Year	Category	Nominee(s)	Result
Academy Award	1976	Best Actor	Maximilian Schell	Nominated
Golden Globe Award	1976	Best Actor – Motion Picture Drama	Maximilian Schell	Nominated
Writers Guild of America Award	1976	Best Adapted Screenplay	Edward Anhalt	Nominated

== See also ==
- List of American films of 1975
- List of Holocaust films
- "Duet", an episode of Star Trek: Deep Space Nine inspired by this film
