= The Leader and the Damned =

1983 novel by Colin Forbes

- First edition
- Author: Colin Forbes
- Language: English
- Genre: Secret history, spy thriller
- Set in: World War II
- Publisher: William Collins, Sons
- Publication date: 1983
- Publication place: United Kingdom
- Media type: Print

The Leader and the Damned is a 1983 spy thriller/secret history novel by Colin Forbes, set on the background of Nazi Germany in the later part of World War II.

== Plot summary ==
The book is based on the assumption that Adolf Hitler was assassinated by dissident Wehrmacht officers who planted a bomb in his plane in March 1943. However, Martin Bormann, who witnessed the crash of Hitler's plane, concealed all evidence and ruthlessly got all witnesses killed. Bormann then replaced Hitler by a double, an actor who resembled Hitler and who had for years practiced as an "understudy" for just such a contingency. The double managed to carry off the deception, precisely emulating Hitler's mannerisms, and was accepted by virtually everybody as the real Hitler; however, his military talents fell far short of those of the original.

The only one to discover the deception was Wing Commander Ian Lindsay, a dashing British pilot who managed to penetrate Hitler's headquarters. The bulk of the book's plot depicts Lindsay's efforts to escape with his vital information, fleeing through Germany, Austria and Yugoslavia, one step ahead of the Gestapo, the SS and the Abwehr - virtually alone except for two courageous and highly capable women who risked all for his sake. Unknown to Lindsay, even if he eludes the Nazis, the Soviet secret services are also plotting his death, at the personal order of Joseph Stalin.

An important secondary plot concerns the true role which Martin Bormann played in the events of WWII, which remains unknown to history, and explains how and why Bormann disappeared after the Fall of Berlin in 1945.
