= Benjamin Fisz =

Polish film producer and writer

Szlomo Benjamin Fisz (4 November 1922 – 17 November 1989) was a Polish film producer and writer, known for A Town Called Bastard, Aces High, Battle of Britain, The Heroes of Telemark and Hell Drivers.

== Biography ==
Fisz was born into a Polish Jewish in Pińsk, Poland (present-day Belarus) in 1922. In 1939, Fisz emigrated to the United Kingdom, where he abecame a fighter pilot in the Royal Air Force during the Second World War. In 1949 he was reported as working as a buyer's agent and was charged in court with stealing gold coins via forged money. He was convicted and the magistrate recommended deportation.

=== Film producer ===
Fisz entered the British film industry after the war. He began producing with four films directed by Cy Endfield. In 1959 Fisz bought the rights to a Yugoslav film, Fugitive from Belgrade intending to remake it in English but this did not happen.

In 1961, Fisz suggested Sean Connery to his friend Harry Saltzman for the role of James Bond while filming On the Fiddle. Fisz had also previously worked with Connery on Hell Drivers.

It was Fisz's idea to make a film about the Battle of Britain. He pitched it to Harry Salztman and they spent five years working on the project. A book on the making of the movie called him "a large, pale, fleshy man very conscious of his tendency to run to corpulence and always on the verge of starting or finishing a new diet, in spite of which he continues, like the late Dylan Thomas, to look like an unmade bed. Though he is a keen reader of English literature and poetry (Thomas included), he speaks the language in a sort of Mittel-European telegraphese which makes him as oft-quoted at Pinewood or Elstree as Goldwyn used to be in Hollywood."

In 1971 he helped form Scotia with Philip Yordan. Their films included A Town Called Bastard, Captain Apache and Bad Man's River.

=== Later career ===
In the 1970s he and Kenneth Rive distributed films in Britain, via International Film Theatres, such as Black Caesar (retitled Godfather of Harlem), Horror Express, What?, A Brief Vacation, Midsummer Night's Dream (the ballet movie) and Eclipse.

In the late 1970s he almost secured finance to make a film about Kim Philby to star Michael Caine and then Robert Shaw and Alan Bates, but it was never made.

Fisz later became a shareholder in the London and Leisure Arts Centre Company. In 1983 he was linked with a scheme to redevelop Wembley Stadium.

== Filmography ==
- The Secret (1955)
- Child in the House (1956)
- Hell Drivers (1957)
- Sea Fury (1958)
- On the Fiddle (1961)
- The Heroes of Telemark (1965)
- Battle of Britain (1969)
- A Town Called Bastard (1971) - also writer
- Horror Express (1973) - executive producer
- Aces High (1976)
- A Nightingale Sang in Berkeley Square (1979)
- The Jigsaw Man (1983)

== Bibliography ==
- Mosley, Leonard (1969). The Battle of Britain; the making of a film. Stein and Day.
- Tadeusz Jerzy Krzystek, Anna Krzystek: Polskie Siły Powietrzne w Wielkiej Brytanii w latach 1940-1947 łącznie z Pomocniczą Lotniczą Służbą Kobiet (PLSK-WAAF). Sandomierz: Stratus, 2012, s. 179. ISBN 9788361421597
