= The Flag (novel) =

1965 novel by Robert Shaw

- First edition (UK)
- Author: Robert Shaw
- Language: English
- Publisher: Chatto & Windus
- Publication date: 1965
- Publication place: United Kingdom
- Followed by: The Man in the Glass Booth

The Flag is a novel written by author and actor Robert Shaw. It was published in 1965. The Flag was the first in a trilogy of novels, to be followed by The Man in the Glass Booth (1967), and A Card from Morocco (1969).
