= Avalanche Express =

1979 film by Mark Robson

- Theatrical release poster
- Directed by: Mark Robson
- Screenplay by: Abraham Polonsky
- Based on: Avalanche Express (1977 novel) by Colin Forbes
- Produced by: Mark Robson
- Starring: Lee Marvin; Robert Shaw; Linda Evans; Maximilian Schell
- Cinematography: Jack Cardiff
- Edited by: Garth Craven
- Music by: Allyn Ferguson
- Production company: Lorimar Productions
- Distributed by: 20th Century-Fox
- Release dates: August 30, 1979 (Netherlands); October 19, 1979 (U.S.)
- Running time: 88 minutes
- Countries: United States; Ireland
- Language: English
- Budget: $11 million or $13.1 million
- Box office: $5.5 million (domestic)

Avalanche Express is a 1979 adventure thriller film starring Lee Marvin, Robert Shaw, Maximilian Schell, Linda Evans, Joe Namath and Horst Buchholz. It was produced and directed principally by Mark Robson, and completed by Monte Hellman after his death during mid-production. Based on a 1977 novel by British author Colin Forbes, the film is about the struggle over a defecting Soviet general, who flees aboard a trans-European express train.

Shooting took place on-location in West Germany and Italy. The film had a difficult production following the death of director-producer Robson, with Hellman and Gene Corman hired to finish the remaining days of principal photography and oversee post-production. This was also the final film of actor Robert Shaw, who died in August 1978, a year before the film's premiere.

== Plot ==
Soviet General Marenkov decides to defect to the West. He is in charge of Operation Winter Harvest, a plot to poison crops in the West. CIA agent Harry Wargrave leads the extraction team. Marenkov meets the team in Milan at La Scala where a rehearsal of Nabucco is underway.

Wargrave's team hustles Marenkov onto the Atlantic Express train to travel across Europe. During the extraction, Wargrave is killed, but his death is a ruse. He reappears on the train's crew, and he is using Marenkov as bait to lure Soviet agents out of hiding. Wargrave knows they will attack the train and expose their identities.

KGB spy-catcher Nikolai Bunin leads the Soviet agents who try several ways of stopping Marenkov's defection. They trigger an avalanche. Wargrave blows up the gangway connection between the front and the back of the train, which allows the lead cars to escape to the safety of a tunnel. At another point, the train is hijacked, but the attempt is foiled. The film ends with Marenkov safely on board a jet headed for his debriefing in the West.

== Cast ==
- Lee Marvin as Col. Harry Wargrave
- Robert Shaw as Gen. Marenkov
- Linda Evans as Elsa Lang
- Maximilian Schell as Col. Nikolai Bunin
- Joe Namath as Leroy
- Horst Buchholz as Julian Scholten
- Mike Connors as Haller
- Claudio Cassinelli as Col. Molinari
- Kristina Nel as Helga Mann
- David Hess as Geiger
- Günter Meisner as Rudi Muehler
- Sylva Langova as Olga
- Cyril Shaps as Sedov
- Vladek Sheybal as Zannbin
- Arthur Brauss as Neckermann
- Sky du Mont as Philip John
- Richard Marner as General Prachko
- Arnold Drummond as Commissar
- Paul Glawion as Alfredo
- Dan van Husen as Bernardo
- Gudo Hoegel as Strehler

== Original novel ==
The film was based on a novel by Colin Forbes which was published in 1977. The Guardian called it an "irresistible adventure yarn." The Evening Telegraph praised it as an "extremely satisfying modern adventure story... told in razor sharp style."

== Production ==
=== Development ===
In June 1977 it was announced film rights had been purchased by Lorimar Films, the filmmaking arm of Lorimar Productions, best known for its work in television. Mark Robson, who had just produced and directed the hugely-successful disaster film Earthquake and had made another successful train set movie (Von Ryan's Express), signed to produce and direct. Jerry Gershwin was the Lorimar executive originally responsible.

Abraham Polonsky wrote the script. Robson called the novel "rather sprawly for film" and "very difficult to synthesize into a motion picture. What Abe brought to it was unity. He has given the characters better motivations which means the total work is better motivated." Robson added the film "does make a political statement in a way... The movie will really come out for those who want to live in peace and co operation."

Much of the film's financing came from the Republic of Ireland, though none of it was actually shot there.

=== Filming ===
Shooting started in Munich on 27 February 1978 and also took place in Milan and Venice. Studio interiors were filmed at Bavaria Studios. A sequence was shot at La Scala. The river bridge scene was filmed in Casalmaggiore.

Filming was physically tough, complicated by increased security caused by terrorism in Europe, and Robson's deteriorating health. The movie had been filming for 65 days in Europe, with ten to go, when Robson fell ill. He was flown to a hospital in London where he later died of a heart attack on 20 June 1978. He was 64 years old. "He sure went with his boots on," said Marvin. Mike Connors said Robson's death "was not unexpected. We could see him go downhill from day to day. The lack of communication on a European picture is terribly exhausting."

Lorimar Films' President Peter Bart called in Monte Hellman to finish the direction and Gene Corman (Roger Corman's brother) was enlisted to complete Robson's duties as producer. Stunt coordinator and second unit director Alan Gibbs was brought in to help complete the remaining action scenes. Hellman had recently helped complete The Greatest after the death of its director, Tom Gries. He had worked a number of times for Gene Corman, who was preparing another film for Lorimar, The Big Red One. John Dykstra was hired to stage an avalanche using models. Director of photography Jack Cardiff had departed the production after Robson's death, and was replaced by his assistants Alec Mills and Federico Del Zoppo.

A scene with an exploding freighter was filmed in Malibu, California.

=== Post-production ===
On August 28, 1978, Robert Shaw died of a heart attack. Though Shaw had finished filming all of his scenes, he had yet to dub his dialogue. A decision was made to have voice actor Robert Rietti dub most of Shaw's dialogue, as Hellman felt Shaw's ill health during shooting had affected his delivery. Only a handful of Shaw's own lines were usable in the final film. Impressionist Rich Little also dubbed a handful of lines. The entire opening sequence was also re-dubbed, as it was decided to redo that scene in Russian with English subtitles instead of having the Russians speak accented English.

In total, Hellman worked on the film for a year and estimated he directed around ten percent of the principal photography, plus all the special effects. "We had to shoot three new live action scenes plus all the special effects scenes and all of the avalanche stuff, and so it was a pretty complicated," he said. "It was the biggest picture I had worked on. I learned a lot on shooting really complex special effects, with miniatures and so forth, combining miniatures and live action."

Hellman, Corman and Rietti were not credited for their work, but the film's end credit contains a note stating: "The producers wish to express their appreciation to Monte Hellman and Gene Corman for their post production services."

Dorothy Spencer, Robson's long time editor, was reportedly replaced by Garth Craven. She is not listed on the credits nor is the original cinematographer Cardiff.

== Reception ==
Rotten Tomatoes rates the film 20% based on five reviews.

Vincent Canby of The New York Times criticized the film's tackiness, suggesting it was copied from The Cassandra Crossing and likening it to the work of exploitation filmmaker Lew Grade, criticizing the actors as appearing "at a loss".

Kevin Thomas of the Los Angeles Times called it "handsome but routine."

Time Out called it "awful", "formulary" and "hammily acted" but explained its curious editing as resulting from the production problems. The Radio Times gave it 2/5 stars, noting its disjointed quality but praising the acting and snowy special effects. Leonard Maltin's annual publications TV Movies and Movie Guide give the film a BOMB rating and were especially critical of the cast.

== See also ==
- List of American films of 1979
