= The Sun Doctor =

1961 novel by Robert Shaw

- First edition (UK)
- Author: Robert Shaw
- Language: English
- Publisher: Chatto & Windus
- Publication date: 1961
- Publication place: United Kingdom
- Awards: Hawthornden Prize

The Sun Doctor was the second novel written in 1961 by author and actor Robert Shaw. It centers on Benjamin Halliday, a British doctor working in Africa who is returning to England to receive a knighthood. However, he is tormented with feelings of remorse and guilt concerning the afflicted African tribe he was attending. He is also haunted by the early death of his father. The story is told mostly in flashback. It is based on Shaw's play Strange Providence. It won the 1962 Hawthornden Prize.
