= Battle of Britain (film) =

1969 WWII film by Guy Hamilton

- U.S. theatrical release poster
- Directed by: Guy Hamilton
- Written by: James Kennaway; Wilfred Greatorex
- Produced by: Harry Saltzman; Benjamin Fisz
- Starring: Harry Andrews; Michael Caine; Trevor Howard; Curt Jürgens; Ian McShane; Kenneth More; Laurence Olivier; Nigel Patrick; Christopher Plummer; Michael Redgrave; Ralph Richardson; Robert Shaw; Patrick Wymark; Susannah York
- Cinematography: Freddie Young
- Edited by: Bert Bates
- Music by: Ron Goodwin; William Walton
- Production company: Spitfire Productions
- Distributed by: United Artists
- Release date: 15 September 1969
- Running time: 133 minutes
- Country: United Kingdom
- Languages: English; German; Polish
- Budget: $14 million or £5 million
- Box office: $13 million

Battle of Britain is a 1969 British war film documenting the events of the Battle of Britain, the war for aerial supremacy between the German Luftwaffe and the defending Royal Air Force waged over British skies during summer of 1940. The nature of the subject drew many respected British actors to accept roles as key figures of the battle, including Laurence Olivier as Air Chief Marshal Sir Hugh Dowding, Trevor Howard as Air Vice-Marshal Keith Park, and Patrick Wymark as Air Vice-Marshal Trafford Leigh-Mallory. Directed by Guy Hamilton and produced by Harry Saltzman and S. Benjamin Fisz, it also starred Michael Caine, Christopher Plummer, and Robert Shaw as Squadron Leaders. The script by James Kennaway and Wilfred Greatorex was based on the book The Narrow Margin by Derek Wood and Derek Dempster.

The film endeavoured to be a generally accurate account of the Battle of Britain, when in the summer and autumn of 1940 the British RAF inflicted a strategic defeat on the Luftwaffe and so ensured the cancellation of Operation Sea Lion, Adolf Hitler's plan to invade Britain. The film is notable for its spectacular flying sequences. It was on a far larger scale than had been seen on film before, or since, making the film's production very expensive.

== Plot ==
During the Battle of France in June 1940, RAF pilots evacuate a small airfield just ahead of advancing German ground forces and under attack by Luftwaffe fighter-bombers. As the deserted beaches of Dunkirk are shown following the evacuation of Allied forces, the BBC reports British Prime Minister Winston Churchill's declaration that "what General Weygand called the 'Battle of France' is over. The Battle of Britain is about to begin."

In neutral Switzerland, the German ambassador proposes new peace terms to his British counterpart. Both realize France's fall and U.S. isolationism has left Britain alone in the war against Germany. Hitler delays attacks against England, hoping that Britain will accept peace terms and British commanders use the delay to train pilots and ground controllers in anticipation of an aerial campaign. German troops train for an amphibious invasion of the British Isles, but the RAF must be destroyed first to ensure the safety of such an invasion.

The Germans launch their air offensive on "Eagle Day" hoping to destroy the RAF on the ground before its Spitfire and Hurricane fighters can get in the air. The attack puts British radar stations at Ventnor and Dover out of action and damages several RAF airfields, but losses are relatively light.

A gruelling battle of attrition ensues. Airfields in Southern England are repeatedly attacked, and British Commonwealth squadrons are dispatched to fight outnumbered as the German air offensive comes in waves day after day.

Tensions develop between commanding officers of RAF 11 Group, and 12 Group. Trafford Leigh-Mallory's 12 Group is tasked with protecting airfields while Keith Park's 11 Group is aloft engaging the enemy, but in raid after raid 12 Group aircraft are nowhere to be seen. Leigh-Mallory explains to Air-Marshal Dowding that the "Big Wing" tactic he proposes to attack the Germans from above takes time to form up. Park complains it takes too long, and the tactic doesn't work.

The battle turns when a lost German bomber unknowingly jettisons its bombs down on London. In retaliation to what was seen as a deliberate attack on civilians, the RAF bombs Berlin. An enraged Adolf Hitler publicly orders London to be razed. The switch to night bombing against civilian targets relieves the pressure on the RAF fighter squadrons.

Hermann Göring arrives in France to personally command the air battle. He expresses confidence that German bombers attacking British cities at night will be virtually unopposed.

Park and Dowding realize the switch to night bombing will allow repairs of British airfields and time to bring fighter squadrons up to strength. And while enemy bombers can reach London, their fighter escort can only provide ten minutes of cover. They conclude that "turning on London could be the Germans' biggest blunder."

The next German daytime raid is overwhelmed by large groups of RAF fighters attacking en masse. Luftwaffe losses are so severe an incensed Göring orders German fighters remain with the bombers. Deprived of both altitude and speed, the fighters are easy prey for British fighters attacking from above. For the first time German losses outweigh British.

The battle reaches its climax during the air battle of 15 September 1940 when British ground control orders every available squadron into the air, leaving no reserve. Intense air melees over London leave both sides with heavy losses.

The next day the RAF anxiously await a raid that never comes. German soldiers awaiting orders for the ground invasion of Britain turn in their life jackets. Air and naval forces withdraw from the coast, leaving airfields abandoned and harbors empty. Göring leaves the coast, accusing his commanders of betrayal. Dowding looks out over the gardens and up to the sky where the words of Winston Churchill appear onscreen: "Never in the field of human conflict was so much owed by so many to so few."

== Cast ==
The Battle of Britain has a large all-star international cast. The film was notable for its attempt to accurately portray the role of the Germans, with participants in the battle including Group Captain Tom Gleave, Wing Commander Robert Stanford Tuck, Squadron Leader Bolesław Drobiński and Luftwaffe Generalleutnant Adolf Galland involved as consultants. During the war, Drobiński had heavily damaged Galland's plane and forced him into a crash-landing. Subtitled German-speaking actors were cast, a departure from other English language British films in the postwar period, where Germans were often played by Anglophone actors.

=== British Commonwealth and Allies ===
- Harry Andrews as Harold Balfour, Under-Secretary of State for Air
- Michael Caine as Squadron Leader Canfield
- Trevor Howard as Air Vice-Marshal Keith Park, Air Officer Commanding No. 11 Group RAF
- Ian McShane as Flight Sergeant Andy Moore
- Kenneth More as Group Captain Barker, Station Commander at RAF Duxford
- Laurence Olivier as Air Chief Marshal Sir Hugh Dowding, Air Officer Commanding-in-Chief RAF, Fighter Command
- Nigel Patrick as Group Captain Hope
- Christopher Plummer as Squadron Leader Colin Harvey, a Canadian pilot in the Royal Air Force
- Michael Redgrave as Air Vice-Marshal Douglas Evill, Senior Air Staff Officer Fighter Command
- Ralph Richardson as Sir David Kelly, British Ambassador to Switzerland
- Robert Shaw as Squadron Leader "Skipper" (Note: Robert Shaw plays an unnamed squadron leader, referred to as "Skipper" – RAF slang for a commanding officer. His only other appellation is his call sign, "Rabbit Leader". Skipper could be inspired by Sailor Malan.)
- Patrick Wymark as Air Vice-Marshal Trafford Leigh-Mallory, Air Officer Commanding No. 12 Group RAF
- Susannah York as Section Officer Maggie Harvey, Colin's wife
- John Baskcomb as Farmer
- Michael Bates as Warrant Officer Warwick
- Isla Blair as Andy's wife
- Tom Chatto as Willoughby's Assistant Controller
- James Cosmo as Jamie
- Robert Flemyng as Wing Commander Willoughby
- Barry Foster as Squadron Leader Edwards
- Edward Fox as Pilot Officer Archie
- Bill Foxley as Squadron Leader Evans
- David Griffin as Sergeant Pilot Chris
- Jack Gwillim as Senior Air Staff Officer
- Myles Hoyle as Peter
- Duncan Lamont as Flight Sergeant Arthur
- Basil Dignam as Tactical Records Officer
- Sarah Lawson as Skipper's wife
- Mark Malicz as Pasco
- André Maranne as French NCO
- Anthony Nicholls as Minister
- Nicholas Pennell as Simon
- Andrzej Scibor as Ox
- Jean Wladon as Jean Jacques

=== Germans and Axis ===
- Curd Jürgens as Maximilian Baron von Richter, German Ambassador to Switzerland
- Hein Riess as Reichsmarschall Hermann Göring, the Commander-in-Chief of the Luftwaffe (Note: According to a booklet publicising the movie, Riess had allegedly once met Göring himself during the war.)
- Dietrich Frauboes as Generalfeldmarschall Erhard Milch, Inspector General of the Luftwaffe
- Peter Hager as Generalfeldmarschall Albert Kesselring, Commander of Luftflotte 2
- Wilfried von Aacken as Generalmajor Theo Osterkamp, Jagdfliegerführer 2
- Karl-Otto Alberty as Generaloberst Hans Jeschonnek, Chief of Staff of the Luftwaffe
- Wolf Harnisch as Generalmajor Johannes Fink, Commander of Kampfgeschwader 2
- Malte Petzel as Oberst Beppo Schmid, Head of Luftwaffe's Military Intelligence Branch
- Manfred Reddemann as Major Falke
- Paul Neuhaus as Major Föhn
- Alexander Allerson as Major Brandt
- Alf Jungermann as Lieutenant Froedl, Brandt's navigator
- Helmut Kirchner as Boehm
- Reinhard Horras as Bruno
- Rolf Stiefel as Adolf Hitler

== Production ==
=== Film proposal ===
In mid-September 1965, S. Benjamin Fisz, a former Hurricane pilot, saw aircraft practising for the Battle of Britain day, over Hyde Park, London. He saw how teenagers did not recognise the aircraft. In that same second, Fisz had a proposal for what became the film. Fisz raced to his office, and telephoned the film executive Freddy Thomas. Fisz asked Thomas if he had liked the film The Longest Day. Thomas said that The Longest Day had made much money. Fisz asked Thomas that if a similar film could be made about the Battle of Britain, that showed each side. Thomas said "It would depend upon what the script was like."

In March 1966, The Rank Organisation announced it would make nine films with a total cost of £7.5 million, of which it would provide £4 million. Two films were financed by Rank completely, a Norman Wisdom movie and a "doctor" comedy (Doctor on Toast which became Doctor in Trouble). The others were The Quiller Memorandum, Deadlier than the Male, Maroc 7, Red Hot Ferrari (never made), The Fifth Coin (never made), The Battle of Britain and The Long Duel.

In May 1966, Harry Saltzman telephoned Fisz, and asked about meeting over dinner that night. Fisz told Saltzman that he could find £1.5m for the film, and that the film would cost around £3.5m. Saltzmann said that he could find the required money. Saltzman approached Paramount, but that proposal never happened. By 1967, Fisz was receiving thousands of letters from around the world about the proposed film, with many containing money. The film's writers proposed to set up a fund.

=== Script ===
By the end of August 1967, a copy of the script was sent to Galland, to be 'checked'. Galland claimed that the description of the bombing by the Germans of civilians in London was a 'malicious distortion of the truth'. Oberst Hans Brustellin and Major Franz Frodel also advised. Former WAAF Squadron Officer Claire Legge, from East Sussex, gave the female military viewpoint. Claire had been at RAF Tangmere during the battle; her husband was Spitfire test pilot Jeffrey Quill.

=== Aircraft ===
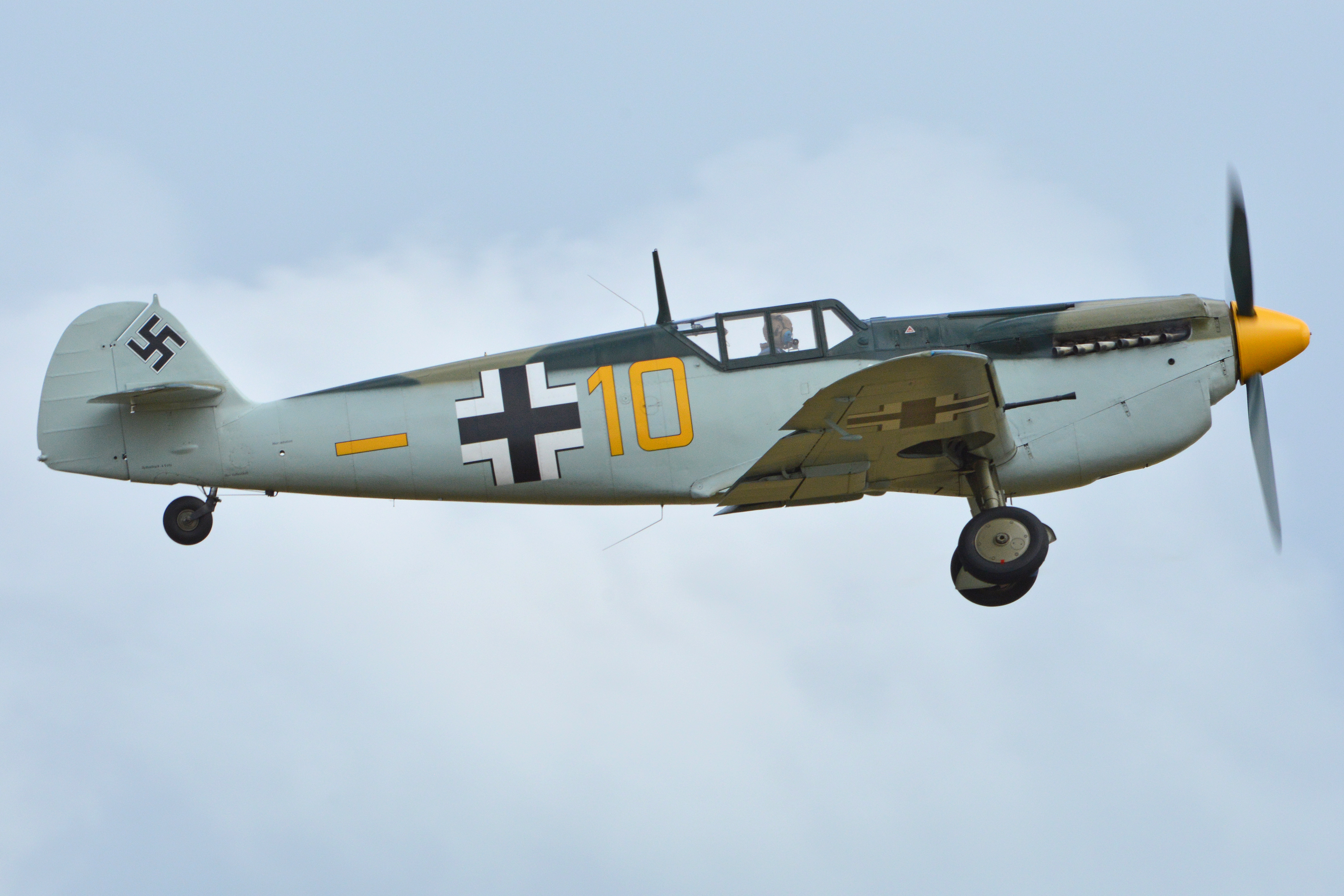
HA-1112 Buchón in 2015, still sporting the livery worn during filming of Battle of Britain. It was also used in the 2017 film Dunkirk

The film required a large number of period aircraft. In September 1965, producers Harry Saltzman and S. Benjamin Fisz contacted former RAF Bomber Command Group Captain T.G. 'Hamish' Mahaddie to find the aircraft and arrange their use. Eventually 100 aircraft were employed, called the "35th largest air force in the world". With Mahaddie's help, the producers located 109 Spitfires in the UK, of which 27 were available although only 12 could be made flyable. Mahaddie negotiated use of six Hawker Hurricanes, of which three were flying. The film helped preserve these aircraft, including a rare Spitfire Mk II which had been a gate guardian at RAF Colerne in Wiltshire.

During the actual aerial conflict, all RAF Spitfires were Rolls-Royce Merlin powered Spitfire Mk I and Mark II variants. However, only one Mk Ia and one Mk IIa (the latter with a Battle of Britain combat record) could be made airworthy, so the producers had to use seven other different marks, all of them built later in the war. To achieve commonality, the production made some modifications to "standardise" the Spitfires, including adding elliptical wingtips, period canopies and other changes.

A pair of two-seat trainer Spitfires were used as camera platforms to achieve realistic aerial combat footage. Lieutenant Maurice Hynett, RN, on leave from duties at Royal Aircraft Establishment, Farnborough, flew a number of Spitfire sequences in the film. A rare Hawker Hurricane XII had been restored by Canadian Bob Diemert, who flew the aircraft in the film. Eight non-flying Spitfires and two Hurricanes were set dressing, with one Hurricane able to taxi.

A North American B-25 Mitchell N6578D, flown by pilots John "Jeff" Hawke and Duane Egli, was the primary filming platform for the aerial sequences. It was fitted with camera positions in the aircraft's nose, tail and waist gun positions. An additional camera, on an articulating arm, was mounted in the aircraft's bomb bay and captured 360-degree shots from below the aircraft. The top gun turret was replaced with a clear dome for the aerial director, who would co-ordinate the other aircraft by radio.

N6578D was painted garishly for line-up references and to make it easier for pilots to determine which way it was manoeuvring.

The Luftwaffe armada included over 50 real aircraft. (screenshot)

As Luftwaffe stand-ins the producers obtained 32 CASA 2.111 twin-engined bombers, a Spanish-built, Merlin-powered version of the German Heinkel He 111H-16. They also located 27 Hispano Aviacion Ha 1112 M1L 'Buchon', a Spanish version of the German Messerschmitt Bf 109 single-engine fighter. The Buchons were altered to better resemble Bf 109Es, with mock machine guns and cannon, redundant tailplane struts, and rounded wingtips removed, but nothing could be done about the Merlin-powered Buchon's nose profile not resembling that of the "inverted" Daimler-Benz DB-601-driven Bf 109E's.

After the film, one HA-1112 was donated to the German Luftwaffenmuseum der Bundeswehr, and converted to a Messerschmitt Bf 109 G-2 variant, depicting the insignias of German ace Gustav Rödel.

Two Heinkels and the 17 flyable Messerschmitts (including one dual-controlled HA-1112-M4L two-seater, used for conversion training and as a camera ship), were flown from Spain to England to complete the shoot. In the scene where the Polish training squadron breaks off to attack, the three most distant Hurricanes were Buchons marked as Hurricanes, as there were not enough flyable Hurricanes. In addition to the combat aircraft, two Spanish-built Junkers Ju 52 transports were used.

=== Pilots ===
Before filming, RAF Duxford was largely derelict. Over 800 pilots had applied to take part in filming, of which ten RAF pilots were selected. Pilots included:

- Flt Lt David Curry, aged 29, of RAF Manby, originally from Worcester, England and lived in Maltby le Marsh in Lincolnshire, who flew a Hurricane; he had flown Canberras in Germany

The flying sequences were led by George Elliott DFC (born c. 1923). During the war, as a Spitfire pilot, Elliott was shot down in 1944 when strafing over Austria, and had taken three months to get back to England, through Yugoslavia. He had not taken part in the Battle of Britain. Aerial filming took place from April to November 1968. The summer of 1968 was not good for filming. The Board of Trade would not let any filming of aerial sequences, if filming was not led by a senior RAF officer, for the safety of other aircraft. Elliott described the aerial filming as 'dangerous'.

There were ten pilots flying German aircraft, led by Commandante Don Pedro Santa Cruz. The German cast were unhappy with the conduct of the four Texas pilots flying German aircraft. The Texans had supplied many historic aircraft, so had been allowed to fly in the film. The Texans appeared as Luftwaffe colonels. The four Texans walked about the set in their Luftwaffe senior officer uniforms, often giving people the 'Heil Hitler' salute. One Texan, whilst in his Luftwaffe uniform, would sing Mexican love songs, with his guitar.

=== Locations ===
Use of RAF bases including Duxford lent an air of authenticity

Filming in England was at Duxford, Debden, North Weald and Hawkinge, all operational stations in 1940; one surviving First World War "Belfast" hangar at Duxford was blown up for the Eagle Day sequence. Some filming also took place at Bovingdon, a former wartime bomber airfield. Some aerial shots were also taken over the former RAF Sywell (now Sywell Aerodrome in Northamptonshire). The title sequence scene, showing a review of German bombers on the ground by Fieldmarshall Milch, was filmed at Tablada aerodrome in Spain. Stunt coordinator Wilson Connie Edwards retained a Mark IX Spitfire, six Buchons, and a P-51 Mustang in lieu of payment, which were stored in Texas until sold to collectors in 2014.

The village of Chilham in Kent became the base of operations for the radio controllers in the film. Denton, another Kent village, and its pub, The Jackdaw Inn, features in the film as the location where Christopher Plummer and his on-screen wife argue about her relocating closer to his posting. The Jackdaw has a room devoted to an extensive collection of RAF Second World War memorabilia.

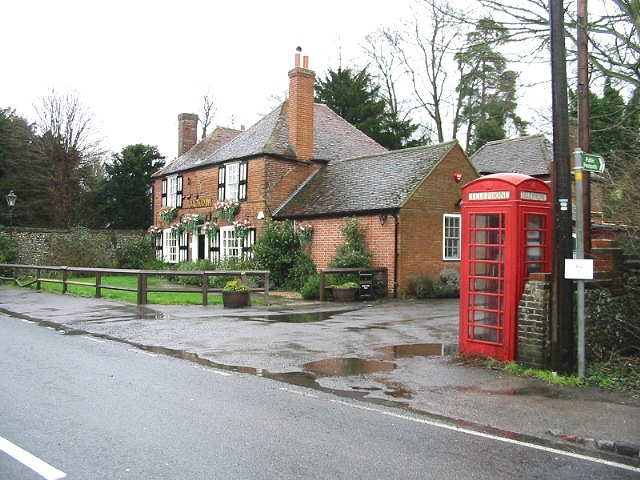
The Jackdaw Inn in 2007

Many of the scenes in the film were filmed in Spain. Among these scenes was the Dunkirk recreation, which was shot at the beachfront in Huelva. To reflect the cloudless skies of summer of 1940, many upward-facing shots were filmed over Spain, while downward-facing shots were almost all below the clouds, over southern England, where farmland is distinctive. However, 1940 camouflage made it difficult to see the aircraft against the ground and sky, so a cloud background was used where possible. Only one Spitfire was relocated to Spain to stand in for the RAF defenders. After filming began, the English weather proved too unreliable and filming was moved to Hal Far and Luqa airfields in Malta to complete the aerial sequences.

Numerous scenes were shot in operations rooms preserved to illustrate the operation of the Dowding system that controlled the fighter squadrons. Much of this footage takes place in 11 Group's operations room, today the Battle of Britain Bunker. Other scenes take place in Fighter Command's central "filter room", as well as recreations of the squadron ops rooms. One scene shows the hit on Biggin Hill's ops room, and another shows its relocation to a local bakery, although this artistic licence is a recreation of another squadron's backup room in a local butcher's shop.

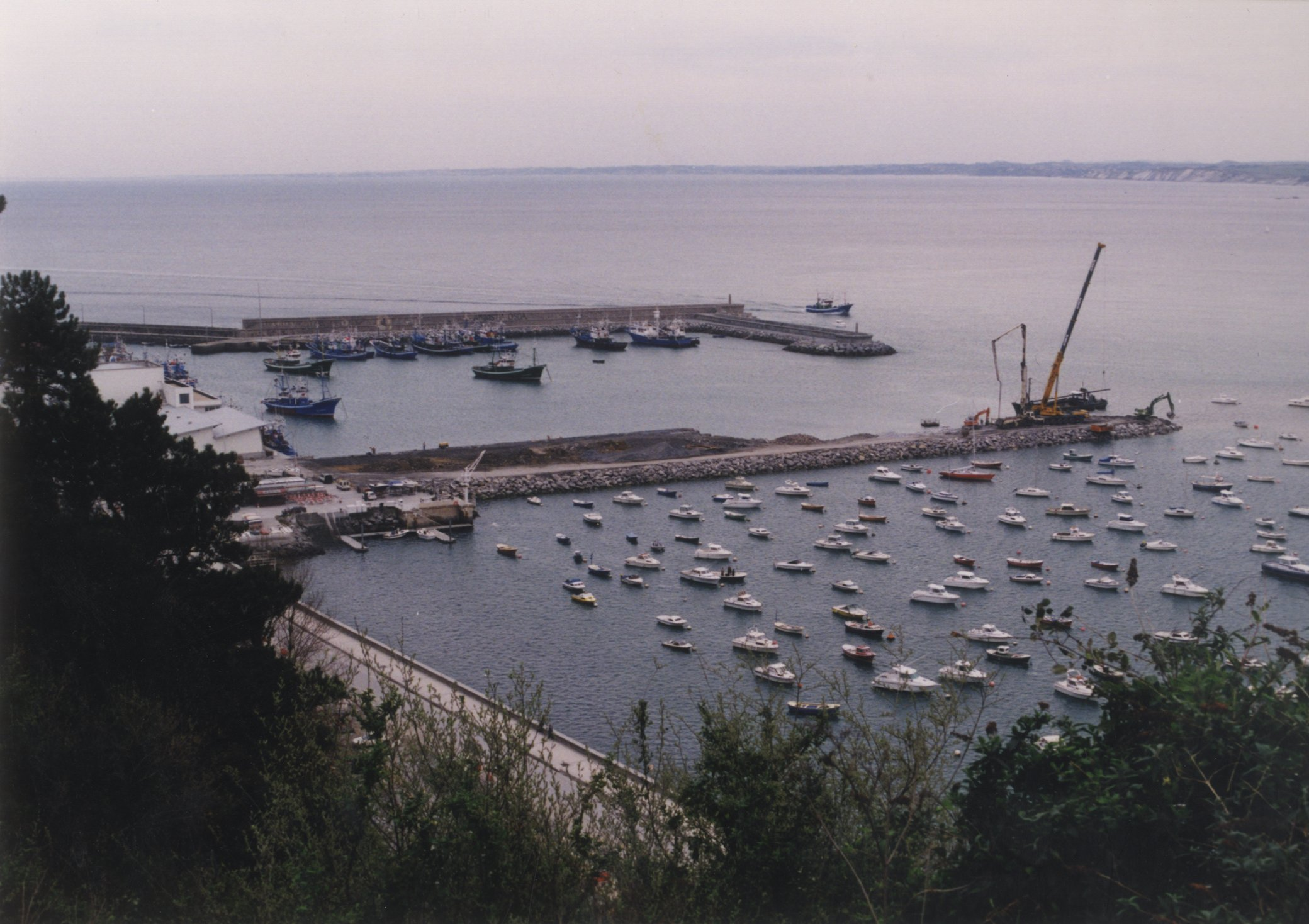
The port of Hondarribia, Spain (here in a later state) was shown as the port of Calais, full with invasion craft

Location filming in London was carried out mainly in the St Katharine Docks area - ironically one of the few areas of London's East End to survive the Blitz relatively intact - where older houses being demolished for housing estates stood in for bombed dwellings and disused buildings were set on fire. Many extras were survivors of the Blitz.

Aldwych tube station, used as a wartime air-raid shelter, served as a filming location. Almost all the period equipment from the London Fire Brigade Museum was used in the film. The night scenes of wartime Berlin were filmed in Donostia-San Sebastian, Spain. Production gaffers were allowed to blackout the city on demand, with health facilities and official buildings backed up with generators. The scenes at RAF Fighter Command were filmed at its headquarters, RAF Bentley Priory. Air Chief Marshal Hugh Dowding's original office, with its original furniture, was used. RAF Henlow, Bedfordshire including its original flight tower (that was constructed from Spitfire and Hurricane parts shipping pallets) was used for Squadron ground sequences.

=== Aircraft models ===
Permission was granted to the producers to use the Royal Air Force Museum's Junkers Ju 87 Stuka dive-bomber, one of only two that survive intact. The 1943 aircraft was repainted and slightly modified to resemble a 1940 model Ju 87. The engine was found to be in excellent condition and there was little difficulty in starting it, but returning the aircraft to airworthiness was ultimately too costly for the filmmakers. Instead, two Percival Proctor training aircraft were converted into half-scale Stukas, with a gull wing, as "Proctukas", although the footage of them was not used. Instead, to duplicate the steep dive of Ju 87 attacks, large models were flown by radio control.

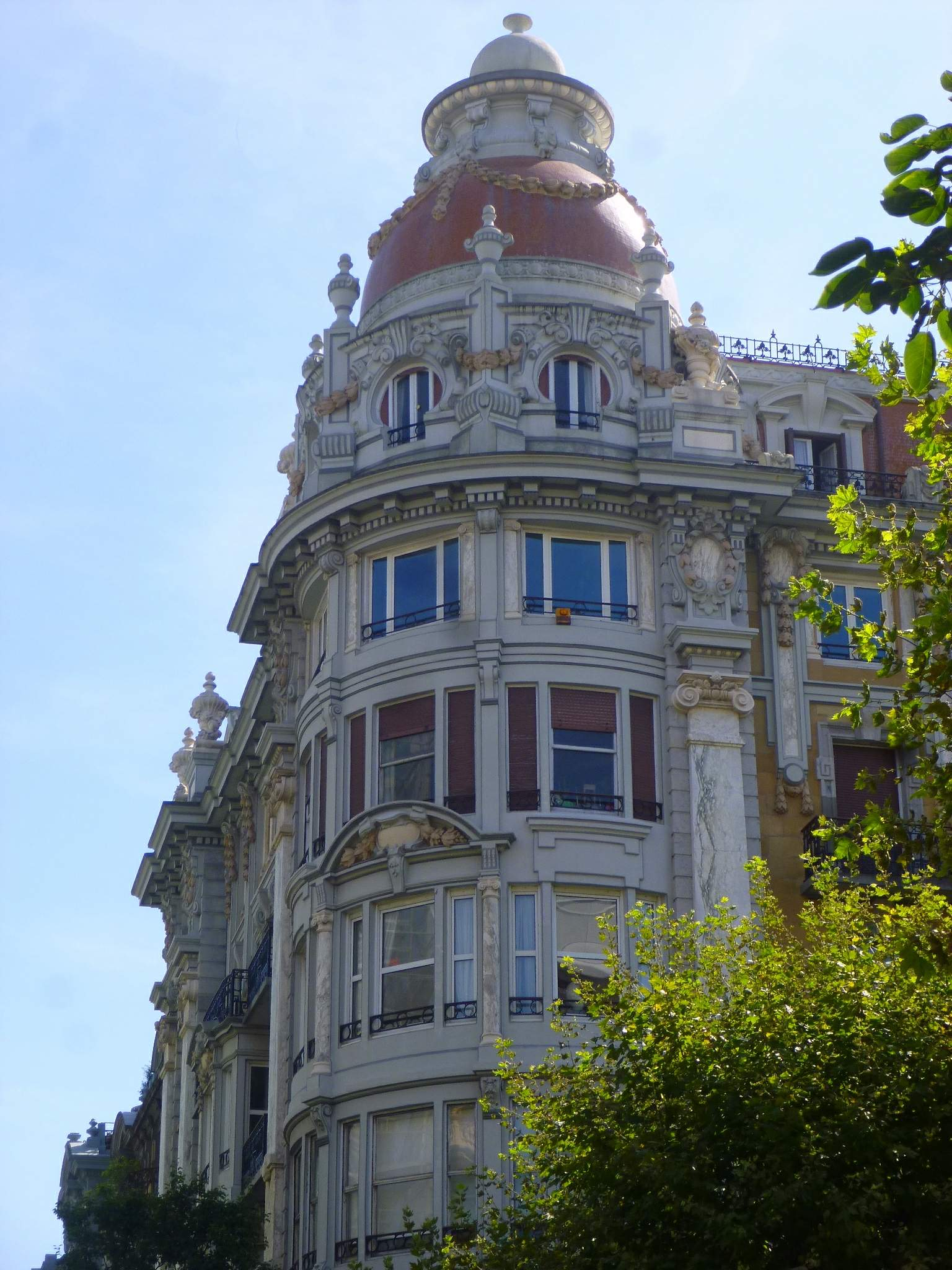
Donostia-San Sebastián's Avenida de la Libertad (shown in 2018) appeared as Berlin's Charlottenburger Chaussee during a British night raid.

To recreate airfield scenes with the limited number of period aircraft available for the film, large-scale models were used. The first requirement was for set decoration replicas. Production of full-size wood and fibreglass Hurricanes, Spitfires and Bf 109s commenced in a sort of production line set up at Pinewood Studios. A number of the replicas were fitted with motorcycle engines to enable them to taxi. Although most of these replicas were destroyed during filming, a small number were made available to museums in the UK.

The other need was for models in aerial sequences, and art director and model maker John Siddall was asked by the producer to create and head a team specifically for this because of his contacts in the modelling community. A test flight was arranged at Lasham Airfield in Hampshire in the UK, and a model was flown down the runway close behind a large American estate car with a cameraman in the rear. This test worked, leading to many radio-controlled models being constructed in the band rehearsal room at Pinewood Studios. Over two years, 82 Spitfires, Hurricanes, Messerschmitts and He 111s were built.

== Historical accuracy ==
Although some characters are merged, the film is generally faithful to events. Most historians doubt that Germany could realistically have won the Battle of Britain, given Britain's superiority in aircraft production, its vast radar and surveillance infrastructure, the superior experience of its pilots, and the inherent advantage of fighting an air war over its home territory. While loss of pilots was an issue, the RAF supplemented its ranks with experienced pilots who had fled Poland, Czechoslovakia, France, Belgium, and other countries Germany had conquered, as well as pilots from other parts of the British Commonwealth and volunteers from the United States.

The film includes a sequence which relates the events of 15 August 1940, when the Luftwaffe attempted to overwhelm fighter defences by simultaneous attacks on northern and southern England, reasoning that "even a Spitfire can't be in two places at once". North East England was attacked by 65 Heinkel He 111s escorted by 34 Messerschmitt Bf 110s, and RAF Driffield was attacked by 50 unescorted Junkers Ju 88s. British defenders shot down 16 bombers and seven fighters out of the 115 bombers and 35 fighters sent. As a result of these casualties, Luftflotte 5 did not appear in strength again in the campaign. (Note: The film's producers did not have access to real or replica Bf 110 or Junkers Ju 88 aircraft, so the Junkers were not mentioned and the Heinkels are described as unescorted.)

The confrontation between Keith Park and Trafford Leigh-Mallory in front of Dowding is fictitious, though there undoubtedly were tensions between the two sides. The film does not mention that following the Battle of Britain Dowding and Park were replaced by Sholto Douglas and Leigh-Mallory, despite the many doubts that Leigh-Mallory's "Big Wing" strategy was workable.

The scene in the operation room in which the British listen to their fighters' wireless transmissions relies on dramatic licence, as the operations room received information by telephone from the sector airfields. The scenes at the end in which the RAF pilots are seen suddenly idle and left awaiting the return of the Luftwaffe raids similarly rely on licence, as the fighting fizzled out through late September, although daylight raids continued for some weeks after the 15 September engagement, and British historians regard 31 October 1940 as the official end of the Battle of Britain. In the film's combat scenes, there was no attempt to recreate tracer rounds. Göring's train in the film is Spanish rather than French (the Renfe - Spanish National Railways - markings are just visible on its tender), and the steam locomotive shown did not come into service on Renfe until 1951.

The film does not mention the Italian pilots of Corpo Aereo Italiano, an Italian expeditionary force, that fought in the Battle of Britain. The list of participants and casualties that is part of the end credits also overlooks them.

Although the State of Israel was not created until 1948, the list attributes one pilot to it, referring to RAF officer George Goodman, an ace born in Haifa during the Palestinian Mandate (when the region was under British administration), who was killed in action in 1941.

Reported German losses during the battle derive from claims made and believed at the time, but subsequent research has shown that these were substantial overestimates, as a result of issues such as multiple claims on the same downed aircraft. The actual number of German losses on 15 September, for example, was 56.

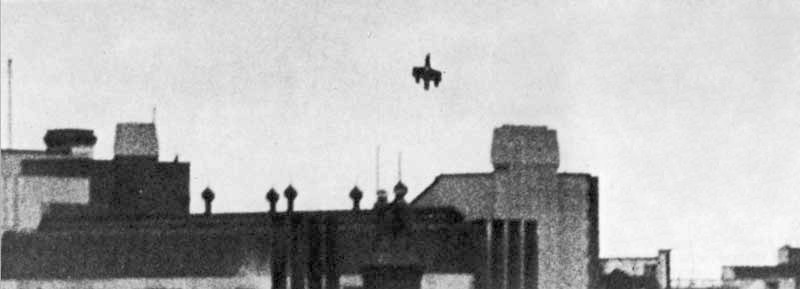
Zehbe's Dornier falling on Victoria Station after being rammed by Flight Sergeant Ray Holmes, 15 September 1940

Pilot Officer Archie, played by Edward Fox, is based on Ray Holmes of No. 504 Squadron RAF. On 15 September 1940, now known as Battle of Britain Day, Holmes used his Hawker Hurricane to destroy a Dornier Do 17 bomber over London by ramming but at the cost of his aircraft (and almost his own life). Holmes, making a head-on attack, found his guns inoperative, and flew his plane into the top-side of the German bomber, cutting off the rear tail section with his wing and causing the bomber to dive out of control and crash. The Dornier pilot, Feldwebel Robert Zehbe, bailed out, only to die later of wounds suffered during the attack. Holmes, although injured, bailed out of his plane and survived. As the RAF did not practise ramming as an air combat tactic, this was considered an impromptu manoeuvre and an act of selfless courage; Holmes was feted by the press as a war hero who saved Buckingham Palace. This event became one of the defining moments of the Battle of Britain and elicited a congratulatory note to the RAF from Queen Wilhelmina of the Netherlands, who had witnessed the crash. The film does not depict the aeroplane ramming into the bomber's tail section; rather, it portrays Pilot Officer Archie simply shooting it down.

Skipper, played by Robert Shaw, is based loosely on Squadron Leader Adolph 'Sailor' Malan, a South African fighter ace and No. 74 Squadron RAF commander during the Battle of Britain.

Section Officer Maggie Harvey, played by Susannah York, is based on Felicity Peake, a young section officer at Biggin Hill in 1940. The heavy raid that resulted in the deaths of several Women's Auxiliary Air Force (WAAF)s serving with her and her resulting confrontation with Warrant Officer Warwick were based on real events.

An RAF officer pilot with a disfigured face appears in a scene with Kenneth More and Susannah York. He was not an actor, but retired Squadron Leader Bill Foxley, a trainee navigator with RAF Bomber Command during World War II who suffered severe burns following a crash. He was notable for his work on behalf of other burn victims and for this film appearance, which gave a wide audience some awareness of the facial burns suffered by World War II aircrews and the reconstructive surgery of that era.

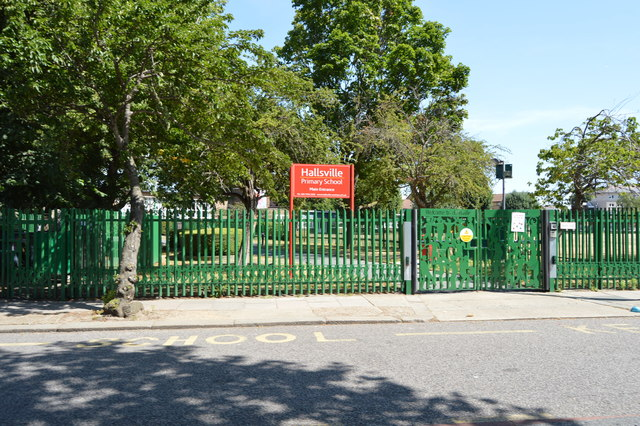
Hallsville Primary School in July 2015

The scene of a school being destroyed could have been based on the fate of South Hallsville School on Agate Street in Canning Town. This school was hit directly by a parachute mine on Saturday 10 September 1940, suffering an estimated 200 dead. The death toll could have been as high as 600 dead. The Hallsville Primary School is there today.

The character of Major Falke is based on Generalleutnant Adolf Galland, a famous ace during the Second World War who actually did ask Reichsmarshall Göring for "an outfit of Spitfires for my squadron". In his autobiography, Galland explained that the request was only meant to upset Göring because he was "unbelievably vexed at the lack of understanding and stubbornness with the command who gave us orders we could not execute", and that, while he felt the Spitfire was more manoeuvrable than the Bf 109, and therefore more suitable as a defensive fighter, "fundamentally I preferred the Bf 109". Galland served as a German technical adviser on the film, and he was joined by his friend Robert Stanford Tuck. He was upset about the director's decision not to use his real name and, during filming, took exception to a scene in which Kesselring is shown giving the Nazi salute, rather than the standard military salute; journalist Leonard Mosley witnessed Galland spoil a shot and being escorted off the set. Subsequently, Galland threatened to withdraw from the production, warning of "dire consequences for the film if the scene stayed in". When the finished scene was screened before Galland and his lawyer, he was persuaded to accept it after all.

== Musical score ==
The film has two musical scores. The first was written by Sir William Walton, then in his late 60s, and conducted by Malcolm Arnold, who also assisted Walton with the orchestration—notably of the music accompanying the Blitz sequences and some sections of "Battle in the Air", which may have also involved some compositional "patches" by Arnold. Aside from the undoubted originality and impact of the "Battle in the Air" sequence, and an opening march (conducted at the sessions by Walton) which was described by a journalist present at its recording as "a grand patriotic tune to out-type and out-glory any that Sir William has yet written, whether for films or coronations", much of Walton's score involves parodies of the horncall from Richard Wagner's Siegfried.

After the recording sessions, Arnold and David Picker, the uncle and nephew in charge of United Artists, insisted on having the music tracks sent to them in New York, and their verdict on hearing the music, unaccompanied by the film, was that it was unsuitable and a composer known to them should be hired to write a replacement score. The music department at United Artists also objected that the score was too short to fill the LP recording that was intended to be marketed with the film, so John Barry, who had scored several James Bond films, was approached, but he declined. The job of re-scoring the film was eventually offered to and accepted by Ron Goodwin, who also served as conductor.

In 2004, both Ron Goodwin's and Sir William Walton's scores were released on a single CD for the first time. Goodwin's music occupied tracks 1 to 19, while Walton's occupied tracks 20 to 28.

Number	Ron Goodwin score	William Walton score
1	Battle of Britain Theme	March Introduction and Battle of Britain March
2	Aces High March	The Young Siegfrieds
3	The Lull Before The Storm	Luftwaffe Victory
4	Work and Play	The Few Fight Back
5	Death and Destruction	Cat and Mouse
6	Briefing the Luftwaffe	Scherzo "Gay Berlin"
7	Prelude to Battle	Dogfight
8	Victory Assured	Scramble / Battle in the Air
9	Defeat	Finale: Battle of Britain March
10	Hitler's Headquarters	
11	Return to Base	
12	Threat	
13	Civilian Tragedy	
14	Offensive Build-Up	
15	Attack	
16	Personal Tragedy	
17	Battle in the Air (Note: The only piece by Sir William Walton to be retained in the final score)	
18	Absent Friends	
19	Battle of Britain - End Title	

== Reception ==
=== Box office ===
In its first two days playing in 11 cities in the UK, the film grossed $56,242. It was the number one film in the United Kingdom for a total of 14 weeks, during periods beginning on 26 September 1969 (4 weeks), 7 November 1969 (7 weeks), 6 February 1970 (2 weeks), and 27 February 1970 (1 week). According to director Guy Hamilton in an interview included on the two-disc DVD release of the film, Battle of Britain grossed just under $13 million at the global box office. Due to its high production and marketing costs, that meant a loss of $10 million, but the film eventually became profitable thanks to home media sales.

=== Critical reviews ===
In the United Kingdom, filming of the aerial battle scenes over London and the home counties generated considerable interest. Pre-release publicity included the film's quad posters on prominent billboard locations and features in The Sunday Times magazine and local press. However, the film was released at a time when anti-war feeling stirred by the Vietnam War was running high, and there was also cynicism among post-war generations about the heroism of those who participated in the Battle of Britain. The film's premiere was held at the Dominion Theatre in London on 15 September 1969 and was attended by 350 Battle of Britain veterans, including Air Chief Marshal Lord Dowding.

The film received mixed reviews in the UK and was not received well by American critics. In Britain, the Evening Standard called it "an absorbing rather than a stirring film", The Times wrote that it was "a discreet mixture of all possible approaches, tastefully done, not unintelligent, eminently respectable, and for the most part deadly dull", and The Guardian called it "neither a very good movie nor a very formidable piece of history". Vincent Canby of The New York Times wrote that the film is an "homage to those airmen who, in 1940, broke the back of the threatened Nazi invasion. It is also one of those all-star non-movies, of a somewhat lower order than The Longest Day, that attempt to recapitulate history, but add nothing to one's understanding. The mixture of minor-key fiction and restaged fact is – for me, anyway – never particularly satisfying, since it is denied the prerogatives and possibilities of both the documentary and the fiction film."

In the Chicago Tribune, Gene Siskel stated: "We believe American film audiences are no longer impressed by casts of thousands and budgets of millions. Unfortunately, Harry Saltzman, who produced The Battle of Britain, disagrees. The film is a 12-thousand-megadollar bomb that features 100 vintage planes eating up 40 minutes of film. The film has absolutely no dramatic interest in the other 93 minutes, and I challenge the notion that it is worth seeing just for the aerial sequences." Siskel later placed the film on his list of the twenty worst films of 1969, remarking that "the planes had the only good lines in the film." Roger Ebert wrote that "the aerial scenes are allowed to run forever and repeat themselves shamelessly, until we're sure we saw that same Heinkel dive into the sea (sorry – the "drink") three times already. And the special effects aren't all that good for a movie that cost $12,000,000." On review aggregator website Rotten Tomatoes, the film has an approval rating of 67% based on 9 reviews, with an average score of 5.8/10.

== Merchandise ==
- Both a hardcover and paperback book on the making of the film were published in 1969.
- A set of 66 bubble-gum collector cards to accompany the film was produced by Spitfire Productions.
- Dinky Toys produced a pair of diecast model aircraft based on the film. A Spitfire Mk II (Dinky Toys 719) in 1/65 scale and a Junkers Ju 87B Stuka (Dinky Toys 721) in 1/72 scale were released in special boxes with a Battle of Britain logo on the box and photographs from the film included. (Note: One of the first examples of "tie-in" merchandising.)

== In popular culture ==
- The fact that Battle of Britain used real aircraft in many of its flying sequences has led a number of subsequent productions to utilise stock footage derived from the film. These productions include the films Adolf Hitler: My Part in his Downfall (1973), Carry On England (1976), Midway (1976), Baa Baa Black Sheep (television series, 1976-8), Hope and Glory (1987), Piece of Cake (ITV miniseries, 1988), No Bananas (BBC miniseries, 1996), Dark Blue World (2001), and First Light (BBC TV movie, 2010), as well as the History Channel documentary The Extraordinary Mr Spitfire (2007), which is about the life of wartime test pilot Alex Henshaw.
- The formative strategy war-game Empire (1977) was notably inspired by the RAF Fighter Command scenes in Battle of Britain, during which staff move counters representing friendly and enemy aircraft and ships over a large map of Britain to help the air commanders make their tactical decisions.
- A fragment from the soundtrack of one of the dogfights in the film is used on the album The Wall (1979) by Pink Floyd, immediately before the start of the track "Vera".
- Footage from the film of Bf 109s exploding and crashing into the English Channel was inserted into the "Skeet Surfing" music video that opens the parody film Top Secret! (1984).
- In the film Dunkirk (2017), Michael Caine has a spoken cameo role as a Royal Air Force Spitfire pilot as a nod to his role of RAF fighter pilot Squadron Leader Canfield in Battle of Britain.

== See also ==
- Hawker Hurricane survivors
- Messerschmitt Bf 109 survivors
- Supermarine Spitfire survivors
- Battle of Britain II: Wings of Victory
