= Dario Biocca =

Italian historian

Dario Biocca is a professor of European history at John Cabot University. He also teaches at the University of Perugia, Italy and has been Coordinatore at Scuola di giornalismo Radiotelevisivo (Perugia). He has a Ph.D. from the University of California, Berkeley and has taught at various institutions in the US and Italy.

Biocca has published:

- "Ignazio Silone, La Doppia Vita di un Italiano", Rizzoli 2005;
- "L'Informatore. Silone, i Comunisti e la Polizia", Luni 2000; with Mauro Canali
- "A Matter of Passion. Selected Letters of Bernard Berenson and Clotilde Marghieri", Berkeley and Los Angeles 1989.
- "Il Muro di Belfast"—An astonishing article on the Belfast cemetery, where a 'sunken wall' separates Catholic graves from Protestant ones - Eerie!, La Rebubblica 15 July 2007
- "La bella addormentata"—A reportage from the walled-up city of Famagusta, Cyprus.La Repubblica, May 5, 2008.
