= Robert Shaw =

English actor and writer (1927–1978)

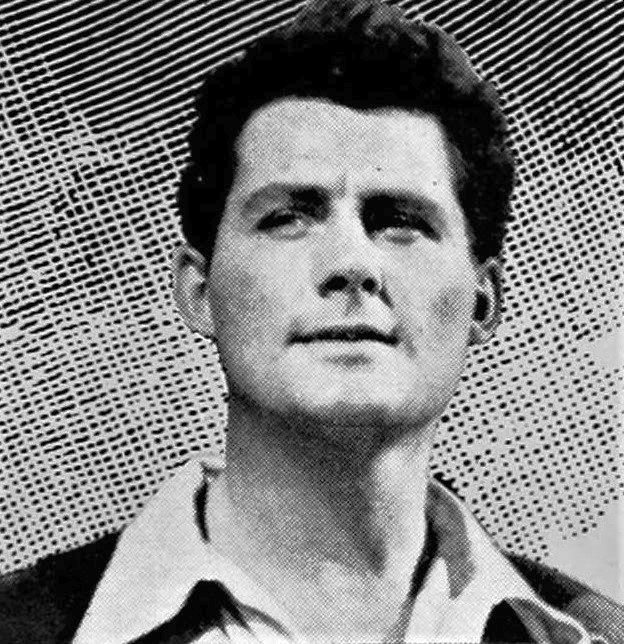
- Shaw in a 1958 advertisement for The Buccaneers
- Born: Robert Archibald Shaw; 9 August 1927; Westhoughton, Lancashire, England
- Died: 28 August 1978 (aged 51); Toormakeady, County Mayo, Ireland
- Occupations: Actor; novelist; playwright; screenwriter
- Years active: 1947–1978
- Spouses: Jennifer Bourke (m. 1952; div. 1963) Mary Ure (m. 1963; died 1975) Virginia Jansen (m. 1976)
- Children: 10, including Ian Shaw
- Relatives: Tanya Landman (niece); Rob Kolar (grandson); Ferdia Shaw (grandson); Evzen Kolar (son-in-law)

Robert Archibald Shaw (9 August 1927 – 28 August 1978) was an English actor and writer. Beginning his career in theatre, Shaw joined the Shakespeare Memorial Theatre after the Second World War and appeared in productions of Macbeth, Henry VIII, Cymbeline, and other Shakespeare plays. With the Old Vic company (1951–52), he continued primarily in Shakespearean roles. In 1959, he starred in a West End production of The Long and the Short and the Tall.

Shaw was nominated for an Academy Award and a Golden Globe for his role as Henry VIII in the drama film A Man for All Seasons (1966). His other film roles included the mobster Doyle Lonnegan in The Sting (1973) and the shark hunter Quint in Jaws (1975). He also played roles in From Russia with Love (1963), Battle of Britain (1969), Young Winston (1972), The Taking of Pelham One Two Three (1974), Robin and Marian (1976), and Black Sunday and The Deep, both of which were released in 1977.

Shaw was also a notable writer, winning the 1962 Hawthornden Prize for his novel The Sun Doctor. His novel and play The Man in the Glass Booth was an international success, earning Shaw a Tony Award nomination for Best Play, and adapted into a 1975 film.

== Early life ==
Robert Archibald Shaw was born on 9 August 1927 at 51 King Street in Westhoughton, Lancashire, the son of Thomas Archibald Shaw and Doreen Nora, née Avery. His father, a medical doctor and former Royal Field Artillery Lieutenant, was of Scottish descent; his mother, a former nurse, was born at Piggs Peak, Swaziland. He had three sisters named Elisabeth, Joanna, and Wendy, and one brother named Alexander.

When Shaw was seven years old, the family moved to Scotland, settling in Stromness, Orkney. After his father's suicide when Shaw was twelve, his mother relocated the family to Cornwall, where he attended the independent Truro School. For a brief period, he was a teacher at Glenhow Preparatory School in Saltburn-by-the-Sea in the North Riding of Yorkshire, before attending the Royal Academy of Dramatic Art in London, graduating in 1948.

== Career ==
=== Early career ===
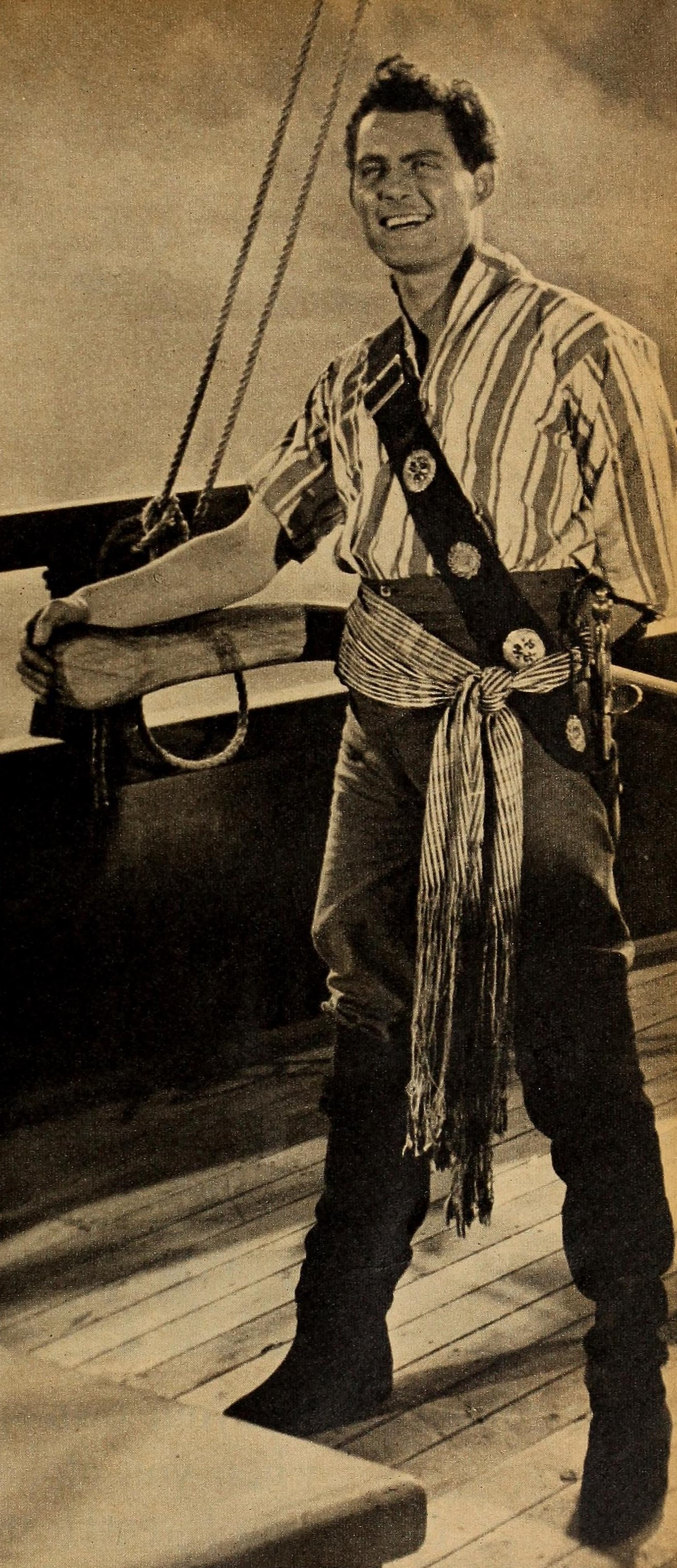
Shaw in The Buccaneers (1957)

Shaw began his acting career in theatre, appearing in regional theatre throughout England. He played Angus in a production of Macbeth at Stratford in 1946. He played at Stratford for two seasons.

In 1947, he appeared in The Cherry Orchard on British TV; also for that medium, he performed scenes from Twelfth Night and Macbeth.

He had a small part in The Lavender Hill Mob (1951), playing a police laboratory technician towards the end of the film; the following year he made his London debut, in the West End, at the Embassy Theatre in Caro William. That year he appeared on TV in A Time to Be Born (1952). He returned to Stratford in 1953.

Shaw had small roles in The Dam Busters (1955), a TV version of The Scarlet Pimpernel (1956), the films Doublecross (1956) and A Hill in Korea (1956) (alongside other young actors like Michael Caine), and a TV version of Hindle Wakes (1957).

=== The Buccaneers ===
Shaw became a TV star in the UK when he starred as Captain Dan Tempest in The Buccaneers (1956–57) which ran for 39 episodes.

He was by this time a TV leading man, having lead roles in TV films such as Success (1957) and a TV version of Rupert of Hentzau (1957). He had a big stage success with The Long and the Short and the Tall on the West End in 1959, directed by Lindsay Anderson, a performance that was filmed for television (though Shaw did not appear in the feature film version).

Shaw had small roles in Sea Fury (1958) and Libel (1959) and guest-starred on William Tell, ITV Television Playhouse, The Four Just Men, and Danger Man. He also appeared in TV plays including The Dark Man, Misfire and The Train Set.

In 1961, he appeared in a Broadway production of Harold Pinter's The Caretaker alongside Donald Pleasence and Alan Bates. Shaw replaced Peter Woodthorpe, who had performed with the others on stage in London. It ran for 165 performances. He had good roles in The Valiant, a war film, and Tomorrow at Ten (both 1962), a thriller. Shaw played the leads in TV versions of The Winter's Tale and The Father (both 1962). He, Pleasence, and Bates reprised their performances in a film version of The Caretaker (1963); Shaw was part of the consortium who helped finance the latter.

=== Writing ===
Shaw's first novel, The Hiding Place, published in 1960, received positive reviews. His second novel The Sun Doctor (1961), was awarded the Hawthornden Prize in 1962.

=== Film fame ===
Shaw became well known as a film actor when cast as assassin Donald "Red" Grant in the second James Bond film, From Russia with Love (1963). For TV he adapted and appeared in a production of A Florentine Tragedy (1963), and was Claudius in Hamlet at Elsinore (1964) with Christopher Plummer. He played the title role in The Luck of Ginger Coffey (1964), shot in Canada alongside Mary Ure, who became his second wife. He had a role in Carol for Another Christmas (1964). Shaw later said of his early career, "I could have been a straight leading man but that struck me as a boring life."

In 1964, Shaw returned to Broadway in a production of The Physicists directed by Peter Brook but it ran for only 55 performances. "I want very much to avoid doing bad commercial pictures for lots of money", he said. "It's difficult to avoid with six kids and two wives." Shaw then embarked on a trilogy of novels – The Flag (1965), The Man in the Glass Booth (1967) and A Card from Morocco (1969). He also adapted The Hiding Place into a screenplay for the film Situation Hopeless ... But Not Serious starring Sir Alec Guinness.

Shaw was the relentless Wehrmacht panzer commander Colonel Hessler in Battle of the Bulge (1965), produced by Philip Yordan; a young Henry VIII in A Man for All Seasons (1966), which earned him a nomination for the Golden Globe Award and the Academy Award for Best Supporting Actor; General George Armstrong Custer in Custer of the West (1967), again for Yordan; Martin Luther in Luther (a 1968 film made for television); he was top billed in another film version of Pinter's The Birthday Party (1968), directed by William Friedkin.

=== The Man in the Glass Booth ===
His play The Man in the Glass Booth was a success in London in 1967. It transferred to Broadway the following year and was a hit, running for 264 performances. His adaptation for the stage of The Man in the Glass Booth gained him the most attention for his writing. The book and play present a complex and morally ambiguous tale of a man who, at various times in the story, is either a Jewish businessman pretending to be a Nazi war criminal, or a Nazi war criminal pretending to be a Jewish businessman. The play was quite controversial when performed in the UK and the US, some critics praising Shaw's "sly, deft and complex examination of the moral issues of nationality and identity", others sharply critical of Shaw's treatment of such a sensitive subject. The play, but not the movie, presents the question: "Given the chance, would Jews behave like Nazis?"

Shaw was one of many stars in Battle of Britain (1969), with the role of Sailor Malan written specifically for him. He had the lead in The Royal Hunt of the Sun (1969) where he played Spanish conquistador Francisco Pizarro, alongside Christopher Plummer who played Incan Emperor Atahualpa, and Figures in a Landscape (1970); his fee for the latter was reportedly $500,000. In 1970, Shaw returned to Broadway playing the title role in Gantry, a musical adaptation of Elmer Gantry, which ran for just one performance, despite co-starring Rita Moreno. His play Cato Street, about the 1820 Cato Street conspiracy, was produced for the first time in 1971 in London. He appeared in Old Times on Broadway in 1971.

As an actor he appeared in A Town Called Bastard (1971), a spaghetti Western; Young Winston (1972), as Lord Randolph Churchill; A Reflection of Fear (1972); The Hireling (1973); he had a cameo in The Golden Voyage of Sinbad (1973); played mobster Doyle Lonnegan in The Sting (1973), a huge hit; was the subway-hijacker and hostage-taker "Mr. Blue" in The Taking of Pelham One Two Three (1974).

He made his final appearance on Broadway, in a production of Dance of Death, in 1974.

The Man in the Glass Booth was further developed for the screen, but Shaw disapproved of the resulting screenplay and had his name removed from the credits. However, he viewed the completed film before its release and asked to have his name reinstated. In 2002, director Arthur Hiller related Shaw's initial objection to the screenplay and his subsequent change of heart:

When we decided that we needed more emotions in the film and leaned it towards that, we tried, obviously, to be honest to Robert Shaw, to keep that intellectual game-playing, but to create more of an emotional environment. And Robert Shaw became very disturbed. He did not like the idea and indeed, if you will watch the film, you will see that his name does not appear in the credits, nor does it even say, "based on the play, The Man in the Glass Booth" because he wouldn't let us do it. He just didn't like the idea until he saw the film. Then he phoned Eddie Anhalt, the screenwriter, and congratulated him because he thought it was—just kept the tone he wanted and did it so well. And he phoned Mort Abrahams the Executive Producer to see if he could get his name put on the final credits. But it was too late to restore his name, all the prints were all made.

Arthur Hiller's account is uncorroborated.

=== Film stardom ===
Shaw achieved his greatest film stardom after playing the shark-obsessed fisherman Quint in Jaws (1975), although he was at first reluctant to take the role since he did not like the book, but decided to accept at the urging of both his wife, actress Mary Ure, and his secretary: "The last time they were that enthusiastic was From Russia with Love. And they were right."

Shaw then appeared in End of the Game (1975); Diamonds (1975), because "I wanted to play a wonderfully elegant Englishman"; Robin and Marian (1976) as the Sheriff of Nottingham opposite Audrey Hepburn (Maid Marian) and Sean Connery (Robin Hood); Swashbuckler (1976); playing the lighthouse keeper and treasure hunter Romer Treece in The Deep (1977), for which his fee was $650,000; and as Israeli Mossad agent David Kabakov in Black Sunday (1977).

During filming Force 10 from Navarone (1978) Shaw said "I'm seriously thinking that this might be my last film ... I no longer have anything real to say. I'm appalled at some of the lines ... I'm not at ease in film. I can't remember the last film I enjoyed making." He made one more film, Avalanche Express (1979). Shaw and director/producer Mark Robson both died of heart attacks during post-production within months of each other; Robson in June 1978 and Shaw in August 1978. Shaw said he would use the proceeds from the film to pay off his taxes, then focus on writing and making the "occasional small film".

== Personal life ==
Shaw was married three times and had 10 children, two of whom were adopted. His first wife was Jennifer Bourke from 1952 to 1963, with whom he had four daughters. His second wife was actress Mary Ure from 1963 to 1975. They had four children, including a son from his wife's previous marriage to playwright John Osborne. This marriage ended with Ure's death from an overdose. His third and final wife was Virginia Jansen from 1976 until his death in 1978, with whom he had one son; he also adopted her son from a previous relationship.

For the last seven years of his life, Shaw lived at Drimbawn House in Tourmakeady, County Mayo, Ireland. Like his father, Shaw was an alcoholic for most of his life.

Shaw referred to himself as a socialist during the 1976 Cork International Film Festival. "I started as a militant socialist, and I couldn't even now vote Tory under pain of death," he elaborated in an interview later the same year, adding that "I still think I am a socialist in a way." Shaw supported British withdrawal from Northern Ireland, arguing that, due to the Troubles, it will lead to more violence and murder.

== Death ==
Shaw died in Ireland at the age of 51 from a heart attack on 28 August 1978, while driving from Castlebar, County Mayo, to his home in Tourmakeady. He was accompanied by his wife and his son. He suddenly became ill, stopped the car, stepped out, then collapsed and lost consciousness on the roadside. He was taken to Castlebar General Hospital, where he was pronounced dead. He had just completed acting in the film Avalanche Express (1979). His body was cremated and his ashes scattered near his home in Tourmakeady. A stone memorial to him was unveiled there in his honour in August 2008, three decades after his death. The Irish language inscription is a common prayer for the dead: May his soul be on the right hand side of God.

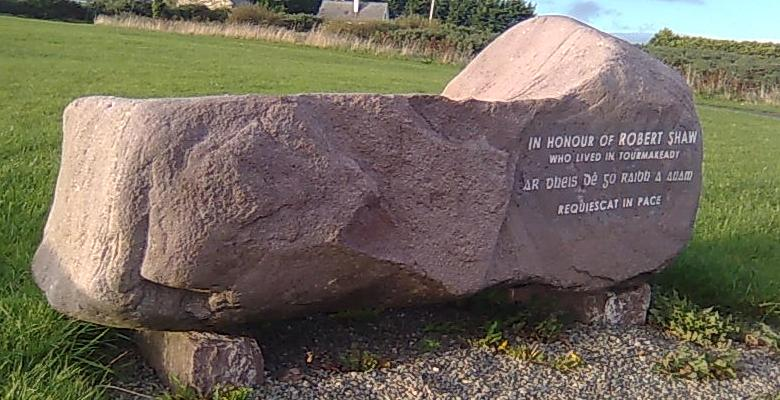
Robert Shaw memorial in Tourmakeady, County Mayo, Ireland, near the location where he died

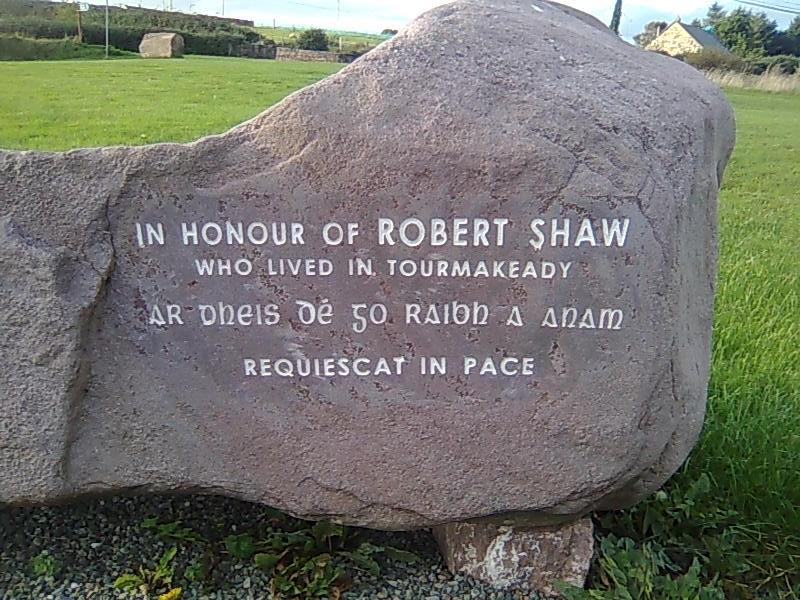
Closeup of the text

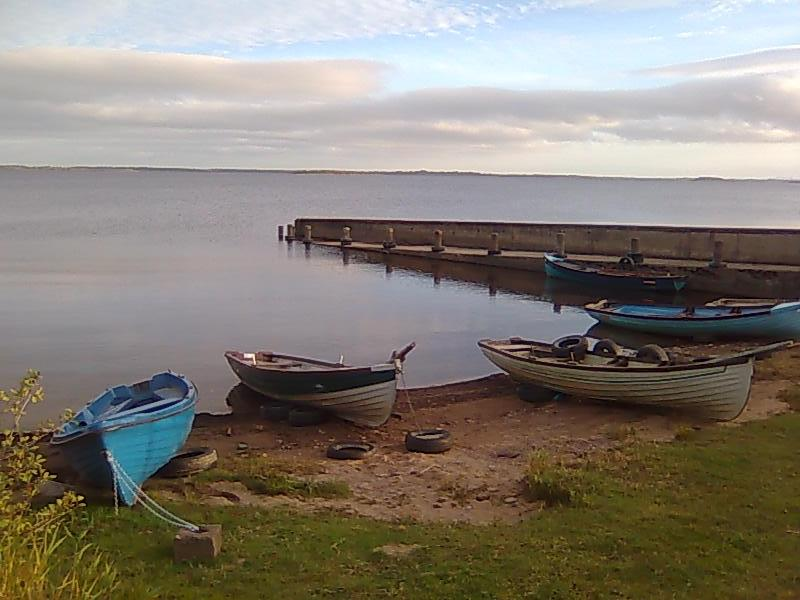
View of the pier at the site

== Tributes ==
Shaw has a Wetherspoons pub named after him in his birthplace of Westhoughton.

The Marvel Comics villain Sebastian Shaw is named and modelled after Shaw.

Film director Ridley Scott, in the DVD commentary for Gladiator (2000) when discussing the casting of Próximo and Marcus Aurelius, said "We have very few Robert Shaws now", implying he had wanted to cast a certain type of rugged actor that Shaw typified, in this case Oliver Reed and Richard Harris.

== Work ==
=== Stage ===
- The Caretaker (1962)
- The Physicists (1964)
- The Man in the Glass Booth (1968)
- Gantry (1970)
- Old Times (1971)
- The Dance of Death (1974)

=== Filmography ===
Year	Title	Role	Notes
1947	The Cherry Orchard		
1951	The Lavender Hill Mob	Chemist at Police Exhibition	Uncredited
1954	The Dam Busters	Flight Sgt. J. Pulford	
1956	Double Cross	Ernest	
1956	A Hill in Korea	Lance Corporal Hodge	
1958	Sea Fury	Gorman	
1959	Libel	First Photographer	
1960	The Dark Man	Alan Regan	TV
1962	The Valiant	Lieutenant Field	
1962	The Father	The Captain	
1962	Tomorrow at Ten	George Marlow	
1963	The Caretaker	Aston	
1963	From Russia with Love	Donald 'Red' Grant	
1964	The Luck of Ginger Coffey	Ginger Coffey	
1965	Battle of the Bulge	Col. Martin Hessler	
1966	A Man for All Seasons	King Henry VIII	
1967	Custer of the West	Gen. George Armstrong Custer	
1968	Luther	Martin Luther	TV
1968	The Birthday Party	Stanley Webber	
1969	Battle of Britain	Squadron Leader "Skipper"	
1969	The Royal Hunt of the Sun	Francisco Pizarro	
1970	Figures in a Landscape	MacConnachie	Also adapted for the screen
1971	A Town Called Bastard	The Priest	a.k.a. A Town Called Hell
1972	A Reflection of Fear	Michael	a.k.a. Labyrinth
1972	Young Winston	Lord Randolph Churchill	
1973	The Hireling	Steven Ledbetter	
1973	The Golden Voyage of Sinbad	The Oracle of All Knowledge	Uncredited
1973	The Sting	Doyle Lonnegan	
1974	The Taking of Pelham One Two Three	Mr. Blue	
1975	Jaws	Quint	
1975	End of the Game	Richard Gastmann	a.k.a. Der Richter und sein Henker, Murder on the Bridge, Deception, and Getting Away with Murder
1975	Diamonds	Charles / Earl Hodgson	
1976	Robin and Marian	Sheriff of Nottingham	
1976	Swashbuckler	Ned Lynch	a.k.a. Scarlet Buccaneer
1977	Black Sunday	Major David Kabokov	
1977	The Deep	Romer Treece	
1978	Force 10 from Navarone	Major Keith Mallory	Released posthumously
1979	Avalanche Express	General Marenkov	Shot in 1978; final film role; released posthumously

=== Television ===
Year	Series	Role	Notes
1956–1957	The Buccaneers	Captain Dan Tempest	
1957	Rupert of Hentzau	Rupert of Hentzau	Television film
1958	Dial 999	Willy	Episode: "Extradition"
1960	Armchair Theatre	Marl Renfrew	Episode: "Misfire"
1960	The Four Just Men	Stuart	Episode: "Crack-Up"
1960	ITV Television Playhouse	Ken Rudge	Episode: "Place Of My Own"
1960	ITV Television Playhouse	Charlie Williams	Episode: "Night Run to the West"
1960	Play of the Week	Wilson	Episode: "The Pets": Adapted by Shaw from his novel "The Hiding Place"
1961	Danger Man	Tony Costello	Episode: "Bury the Dead"
1962	The Winter's Tale	Leontes	Television film
1964	Hamlet at Elsinore	King Claudius	Television film
1964	Carol for Another Christmas	Ghost of Christmas Future	Television film
1974	The Wide World of Mystery	Giles	Episode: "The Break"

=== Writing ===
- The Hiding Place (1960)
- The Sun Doctor (1961) Awarded the Hawthornden Prize in 1962
- The Flag (1965)
- Situation Hopeless ... But Not Serious (screenplay adaptation of The Hiding Place, 1965)
- The Man in the Glass Booth (1967)
- The Man in the Glass Booth (play adaptation, 1968)
- A Card from Morocco (1969)
- Figures in a Landscape (1970) (screenplay adaptation of novel)
- Cato Street (play, 1971)
- Jaws (1975) (uncredited rewrite of Indianapolis monologue)

== Awards and honours ==
At the 39th Academy Awards in 1967, Shaw became the second actor – after Charles Laughton – to receive an Oscar nomination for portraying Henry VIII of England, in the film A Man for All Seasons (1966). He was also nominated for a Golden Globe Award for that same role, as well as a Grammy Award for Best Spoken Word, Documentary or Drama Recording for the audio adaptation of the film and play. Shaw would go on to win supporting actor honors from both the National Board of Review and the Kansas City Film Critics Circle. Additionally, Shaw's performance in the 1972 biopic Young Winston earned him a Best Supporting Actor nomination from the New York Film Critics Circle, and he would also receive a posthumous win from the Online Film & Television Association for his turn in Jaws.

== See also ==
- List of Academy Award winners and nominees from Great Britain
- List of actors with Academy Award nominations
