= Matteotti =

Matteotti is an Italian surname. Notable people with the surname include:

- Giacomo Matteotti (1885–1924), Italian politician
- Gianmatteo Matteotti (1921–2000), Italian politician
- Luca Matteotti (born 1989), Italian snowboarder

== See also ==
- Ponte Giacomo Matteotti, is a bridge that links Lungotevere Arnaldo da Brescia to Piazza delle Cinque Giornate in Rome, Italy
- The Assassination of Matteotti, is a 1973 Italian historical drama film directed by Florestano Vancin
- Trofeo Matteotti, is a single-day road bicycle race held annually in Pescara, Italy
