= XX Congress of the Italian Socialist Party =

The XX Congress of the Italian Socialist Party (PSI) was held in Milan from 15 to 17 April 1923. It was a crucial event that marked the definitive defeat of the "fusionist" line (led by Giacinto Menotti Serrati), which aimed to join the PSI to the Communist Party of Italy within the Comintern.

== Background ==
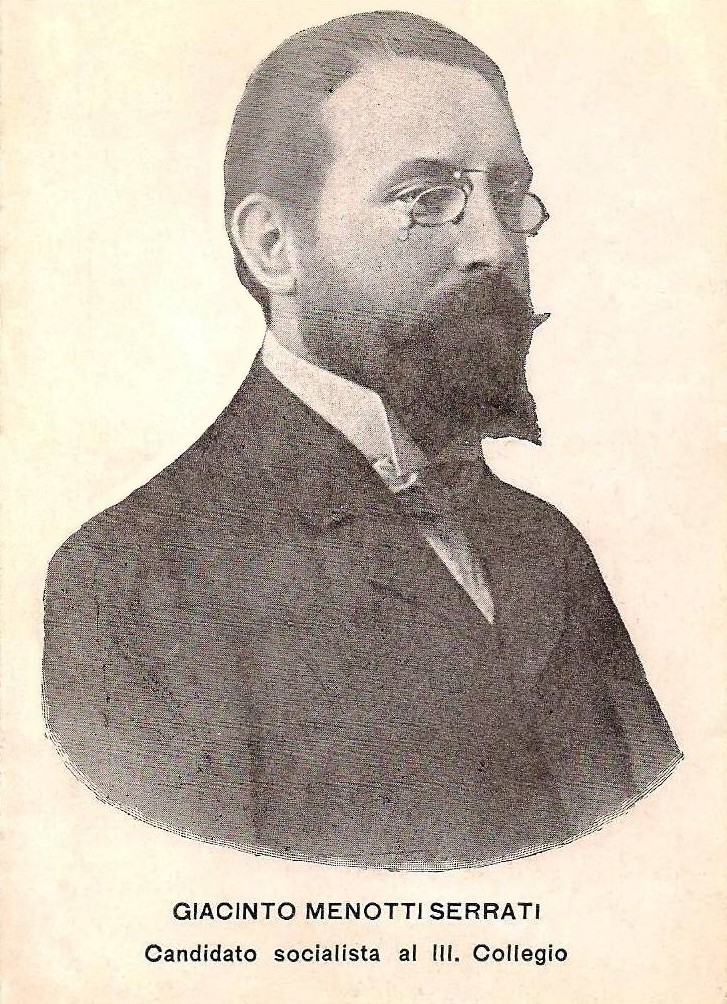
Giacinto Menotti Serrati

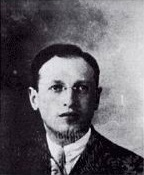
Pietro Nenni

Since the XIX Congress in Rome the previous October, the political situation had grown much more severe for the socialists. Soon after the Milan Congress ended the National Fascist Party organised the March on Rome and took power. On December 21, the Fascists killed 11 workers in Turin. In February 1923 2,000 socialists and communists were arrested, though most were released soon afterwards.

In the face of this threat the PSI had split, with Filippo Turati and his reformist followers establishing the Unitary Socialist Party (PSU). and taking with them two thirds of the socialist parliamentary group.

Meanwhile the PSI began negotiations to join the Comintern, sending a delegation to Moscow for the 4th World Congress of the Communist International. The representatives of the Communist Party of Italy asked for PSI members to be admitted into the PCI on an individual basis rather than arranging a merger between their parties, but the Executive of the International preferred a compromise which involved fusion between the two parties. On their return from Moscow, delegates who had attended the Comintern Congress were subjected to repressive measures. The communist Amadeo Bordiga was arrested, as was the socialist Giacinto Menotti Serrati.

== Proceedings ==
Against this backdrop, the main business of the XX Congress was to decide whether or not to merge with the Communist Party of Italy. The main advocate for unifying the parties was the “fusionist” Serrati, while Pietro Nenni emerged as the leader of the “automonists” - those wanting the PSI to remain an independent party.

At the end of the congress Serrati’s motion had 3,968 votes whereas Nenni’s secured 5,361.

== Aftermath ==
Following his defeat at the congress, Serrati was ousted from the PSI leadership by Nenni while he was still in prison and in 1924 joined the Communist Party of Italy.

Thanks to his success at this congress, Nenni took over the direction of the party newspaper, Avanti!. His triumph was short-lived however. In November 1925 Mussolini dissolved the PSU, composed of the reformist elements Serrati had expelled from the PSI. Nenni tried to persuade the rest of the PSI leadership to readmit Filippo Turati, Claudio Treves and their colleagues. When they refused, Nenni resigned from the party leadership and from the direction of Avanti!.

The XXI Congress of the PSI did not take place until 1930. It was held in exile in Paris. This congress saw the reunification of the PSI with the reformist PSU.
