= XIX Congress of the Italian Socialist Party =

The XIX Congress of the Italian Socialist Party (PSI) was held in Rome from 1 to 4 October 1922.

== Background ==
The central issue of the congress was whether reformist elements within the party should be expelled. This question had been dominating the internal debate within the PSI since the 2nd World Congress of the Communist International in 1920, when the Comintern had made the expulsion of reformists one of the 21 requirements for admission. The refusal of the maximalist majority within the PSI to implement this purge had been the origin of the split with the left wing of the party at the Livorno Congress in January 1921. This saw the members wishing to support the Comintern line leave the PSI to found the new Italian Communist Party.

This position had also been confirmed at the subsequent Milan Congress in October of the same year. Here a group known as the Third Internationalists led by Costantino Lazzari, it:Fabrizio Maffi and Ezio Riboldi had tried to bring the party into line with the positions of the Comintern. Despite their efforts however, the maximalist majority in Milan confirmed that reformists would not be expelled.

Since the Milan Congress, Filippo Turati and other reformists had broken party discipline by seeking to collaborate with bourgeois politicians, accepting King Vittorio Emanuele III’s invitation to take part in consultations during a political crisis in the first Facta government. This clear breach of longstanding policy changed the dynamics of how the question of expelling reformists was approached.

== Proceedings ==
For the Rome Congress, the maximalist majority, led by Giacinto Menotti Serrati and Fabrizio Maffi, presented a motion which would expel the reformist wing. An opposing unitarist proposal that sought to keep the party together was supported by Turati and his followers, as well as by some maximalists who were against the purge of the right wing, including it:Adelchi Baratono and Ferdinando Cazzamalli. Among the supporters of the opportunity of the split, Serrati judged it impossible to continue to coexist with those who were willing to collaborate with the bourgeoisie, analysing that the numerical factor guaranteed by unity was less relevant than the need to keep alight a torch “which will blaze at the moment determined by the fatal unfolding of the class struggle.”

The reformist Claudio Treves defended the collaboration with bourgeois politicians, which he declared was temporary and aimed at preventing reactionary forces from destroying the gains of the proletariat. While acknowledging that the split was now a foregone conclusion, Treves supported the need to keep the Socialist Party united internally and independent from the communists. He accused the Comintern of having become an instrument under the exclusive control of the Russian state, which was using it for its own specific interests.

In the end, on the evening of October 3, the maximalist motion narrowly prevailed, by 32,106 votes to 29,119. Resigned, Turati expressed his regret thus: “Let us bid farewell with the auspicious cry of "Long live socialism!", hoping that this cry may one day - if we are wise - unite us once again in a common work of duty, of sacrifice, of victory!”

The delegates of the PSI majority confirmed it:Domenico Fioritto as secretary of the party and Serrati as director of Avanti!.

== Aftermath ==
The next morning Turati and his followers established the Unitary Socialist Party (PSU). Giacomo Matteotti was elected secretary, while Treves took over the direction of the periodical La Giustizia, whose headquarters were transferred from Reggio Emilia to Milan and became the official organ of the new party. Over two thirds of the socialist parliamentary group joined the ranks of the PSU.

After the expulsion of the reformists, the PSI began negotiations to join the Comintern, sending a delegation led by Serrati, Maffi, Tonetti, Garuccio and Romita to Moscow for the 4th World Congress of the Communist International. The representatives of the Communist Party of Italy asked for PSI members to be admitted into the PCI on an individual basis rather than arranging a merger between their parties, but the Executive of the International preferred a compromise which involved fusion between the two parties.

This Comintern arrangement led to a fresh split within the PSI between those who supported it, including Serrati, and opponents such as Pietro Nenni, it:Arturo Vella and it:Gustavo Sacerdote, who had already raised reservations at the Rome Congress about attempting to join the Comintern again. The two currents would face each other in April 1923 in Milan during the 20th Congress of the PSI.
