= Paolo Treves =

Italian politician, publicist, political scientist, academic and anti-fascist

Paolo Treves (27 July 1908 – 4 August 1958) was an Italian politician, publicist, political scientist, academic and anti-fascist.

== Biography ==
Born in Milan on 27 July 1908, the son of well-known Italian socialist Claudio Treves (1869–1933), Treves worked for the Milanese socialist paper La Giustizia in the 1920s and studied under Benedetto Croce, with whom he corresponded until the outbreak of war (despite the latter's tacit support for Benito Mussolini). Following the establishment of the Fascist regime in 1922, Paolo was singled out and detained for several months by the government, primarily because of Mussolini's hatred of the elder Treves.

After fleeing Italy in 1926, Paolo became a member of the Executive Committee of the then-underground Italian Socialist Party (Partito Socialista Italiano; PSI). He worked as a liaison officer with Italian exiles in Paris and then, following his father's death and a short return to Italy, lived in Britain from 1938 to 1944. Treves studied Linguistics at Liverpool University in 1939 and became a lecturer in Italian at Bedford College, University of London. He was recruited to be a scriptwriter and broadcaster for the Italian section of the BBC in 1940 and worked there until 1944. He contributed to several papers on Italian affairs and published What Mussolini did to us (1940) and Italy, Yesterday, Today and Tomorrow (1942). As a member of the London branch of the PSI, Treves sat on the Advisory Committee of the International Socialist Forum and the International Bureau of the Fabian Society.

Treves returned to Italy in 1945 and became an editor of the PSI daily newspaper, Avanti!. In 1947 he broke from the party, and the following year was elected to the Chamber of Deputies as a member of the anti-communist Italian Democratic Socialist Party (Partito Socialista Democratico Italiano; PSDI). He served in a number of post-war government ministries, including a period spent as an undersecretary at the Ministry for Foreign Relations (1954–57).

Paolo Treves was a cousin of the Italian writer, painter and politician Carlo Levi, who was also persecuted by the Fascist regime. Treves died in Fregene, near Rome, on 4 August 1958.

== Sources ==
- Pietro Nenni, Gino Calzolari, Riccardo Luzzatto, Paolo Treves. Italy's Struggle for Liberation. International publishing, London (1944).
- http://www.iisg.nl/archives/en/files/t/10771489.php : Paolo Treves Papers, International Institute of Social History.
- Fabio Fernando Rizi. Benedetto Croce and Italian Fascism. University of Toronto Press (2003). ISBN 0-8020-3762-3
