= Giacomo Matteotti =

Italian politician (1885–1924)

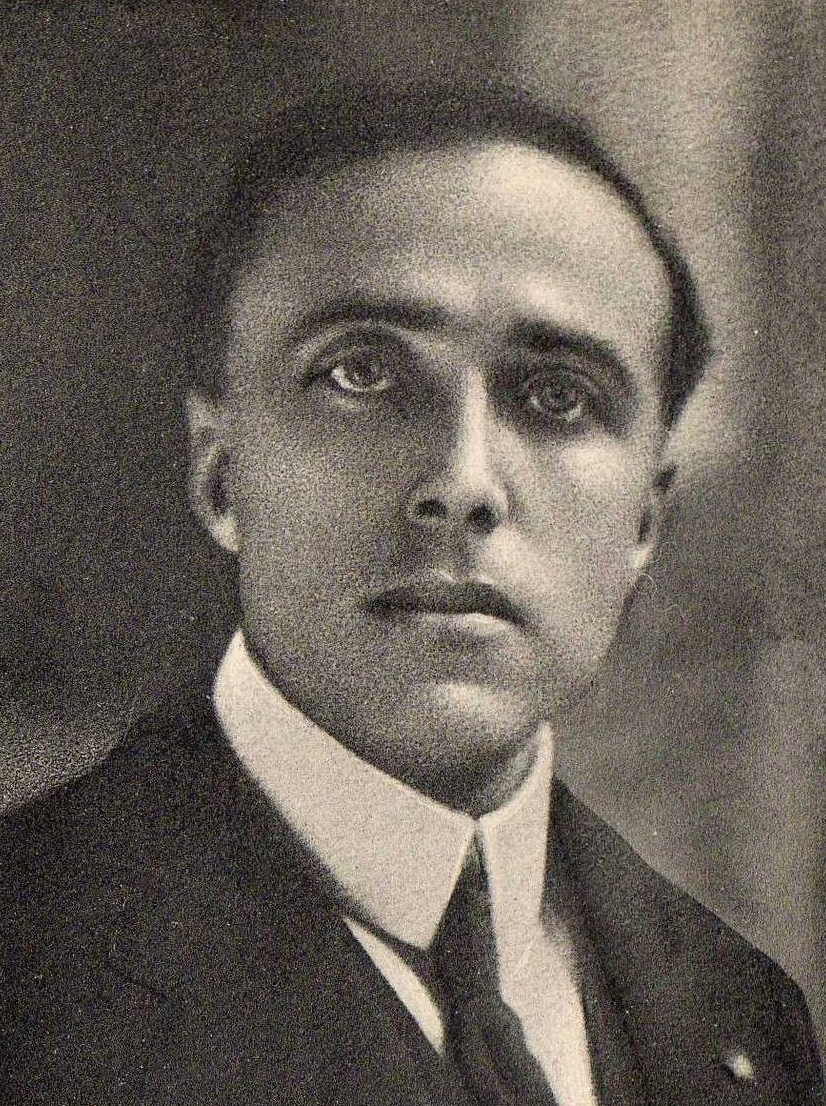

Secretary of the Unitary Socialist Party
- In office 8 October 1922 – 10 June 1924
- Preceded by: Office established
- Succeeded by: Collective secretariat

Member of the Chamber of Deputies
- In office 1 December 1919 – 10 June 1924
- Constituency: Ferrara (1919–1921); Padua (1921–1924); Rovigo (1924)

Mayor of Villamarzana
- In office 3 October 1912 – 10 August 1914

Personal details
- Born: 22 May 1885 Fratta Polesine, Italy
- Died: 10 June 1924 (aged 39) Rome, Italy
- Cause of death: Assassination
- Party: PSI (1900–1922); PSU (1922–1924)
- Spouse: Velia Titta (m. 1916)
- Children: Giancarlo (1918–2006); Gianmatteo (1921–2000); Isabella (1922–1994)
- Education: University of Bologna
- Profession: Lawyer, journalist

Giacomo Matteotti (Italian: [ˈdʒaːkomo matteˈɔtti]; 22 May 1885 – 10 June 1924) was an Italian socialist and anti-fascist politician who served as the opposition leader and as secretary of the Unitary Socialist Party (PSU) from 1922 to 1924. Born in the province of Rovigo in Fratta Polesine, he was a militant socialist from a young age, joining the youth wing of the Italian Socialist Party (PSI) in 1898 and then the main party around 1900. In 1907, he graduated in law at the University of Bologna. A lawyer by degree and a journalist by trade, Matteotti was a follower of Filippo Turati, a co-founder of the PSI and leader of the gradualist wing. Politically, his name is associated with democratic socialism and social democracy, and his thought is summarised as reformist socialist, radical reformist, and revolutionary reformist.

Matteotti was elected mayor of Villamarzana in the Italian region of Veneto in 1912. In line with the law allowing the possibility of being elected in all the towns where taxes were paid, he also entered the municipal councils of several towns of Veneto, and was appointed deputy mayor of Fratta Polesine and councillor of Frassinelle Polesine. In 1914, Matteotti was re-elected to the provincial council. Matteotti's opposition to the Great War resulted in his being interned in the Italian region of Sicily. In the 1919 Italian general election, Matteotti was elected a member of the Chamber of Deputies, where the PSI was the most voted party and became the largest political group.

While the 1921 Italian general election saw him re-elected for a second term as the PSI remained the most voted and largest party despite losses and fascist violence, Matteotti and the PSI were not part of the government. At the 1922 party congress in Rome, the gradualist wing led by Turati was expelled from the PSI, and Matteotti followed Turati in establishing the PSU. An anti-Leninist socialist, Matteotti grew critical of Bolshevism, whose violence and authoritarianism he saw as antithetical and useless in establishing socialism, and excluded them from the anti-fascist bloc. In turn, he was criticised by the Soviet and Italian Bolshevik parties, which continued by some exponents of the Italian Communist Party (PCI) into the 1970s; other PCI members rejected the criticism and celebrated Matteotti for his socialist anti-fascism. Matteotti led the PSU into the 1924 Italian general election and was re-elected a third time.

On 30 May 1924, Matteotti openly spoke in the Italian Parliament, alleging the National Fascist Party (PNF) and its supporters committed electoral fraud, and denounced the violence they used to gain votes. Eleven days later, he was kidnapped by a fascist squad led by Amerigo Dumini and killed by the secret political police of Benito Mussolini due to his denunciations of the illegalities committed by the nascent dictatorship of Mussolini. While some historians debated and questioned whether the murder came on Mussolini's orders, Matteotti's death and the subsequent speech where Mussolini assumed responsibility are generally considered the beginning of Mussolini's dictatorship and a turning point of Fascist Italy. By 1926, Fascistissime laws were enacted by the Mussolini government, which turned Italy into a one-party state, and the deputies who had participated in the Aventine Secession to protest Matteotti's assassination were dismissed and excluded from the parliament. After the fall of Mussolini's regime and the end of World War II, Matteotti was officially commemorated and in the history of the Italian Republic is celebrated as a martyr, with numerous places named after him and established in his honour, including the centenary of his assassination.

== Early life ==
=== Family ===
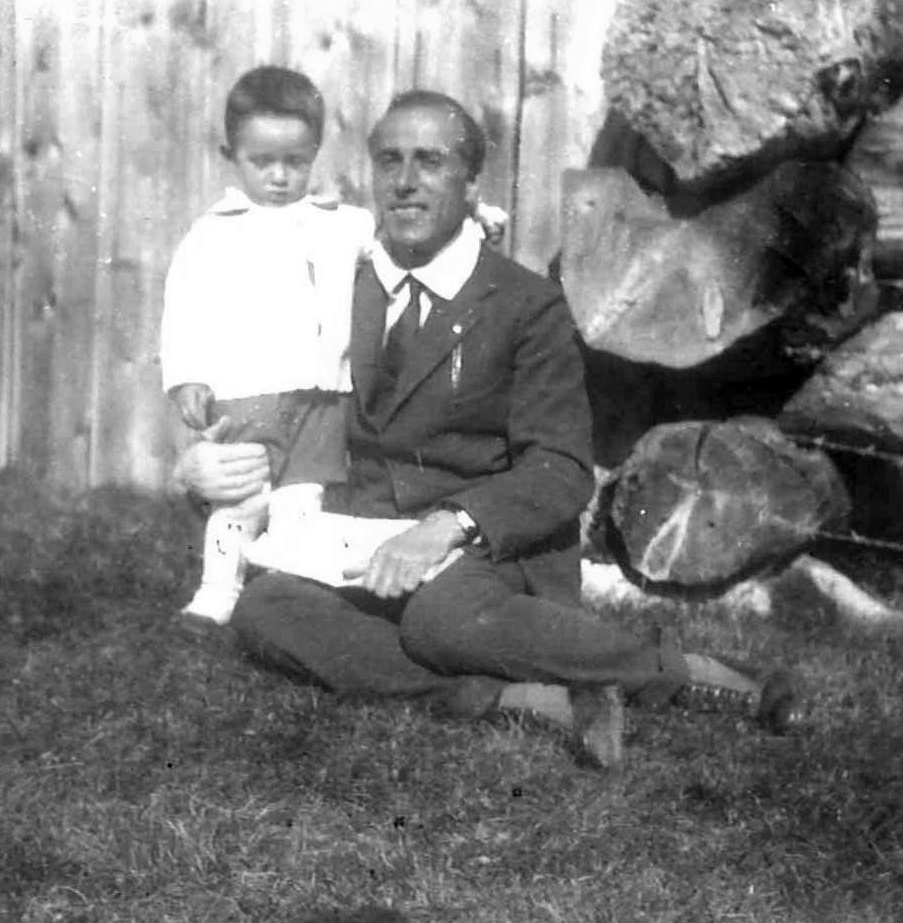
Matteotti with one of his sons

Matteotti was born on 22 May 1885, a Friday, into a wealthy family in Fratta Polesine, near Rovigo (around 15 to 23 kilometres south of Rovigo), which at that time had about 3,000 inhabitants. He was given Lauro as the middle name. His parents were Girolamo Stefano Matteotti (1839–1902) and Elisabetta Garzarolo (1851–1931), known as Isabella, who got married in Fratta Polesine on 7 February 1875. Matteotti had six siblings, four of whom (Ginevra, Dante, Aquino, and Giocasta) died at a young age; of the adults, Matteotti was the second-born between Matteo (1876–1909) and Silvio (1887–1910) and the only one to survive his brothers who died young of tuberculosis. They all became involved in politics in the ranks of the PSI following the example of their father who had been a municipal councillor of Fratta Polesine between 1896 and 1897. The Matteotti family was originally from Comasine in Val di Peio, in the Trentino region.

Already in 1837, his great-grandfather Stefano Matteotti was active in the buying and selling of copper and iron in Arquà Polesine, which at that time was part of the Kingdom of Lombardy–Venetia. His grandfather Matteo Matteotti and his wife Caterina Sartori, whom he had married in 1813, moved permanently to Fratta Polesine in 1845, carrying on his father's business. Matteotti's grandfather died in 1858 at the age 47 due to injuries resulting from a fight, and Matteotti's father continued and expanded the family business by opening two shops: the first in Fratta Polesine and the second in Costa di Rovigo. In the 1860s, Matteotti's father invested his capital in the purchase of land expropriated from parishes, thus also starting the interest-bearing lending business and reaching a wealthy economic position.

In 1912, while on holiday in Abetone, Matteotti met Velia Titta, a 22-year old poet who was deeply religious and the younger sister of Titta Ruffo, a famous baritone. They married in a civil ceremony in 1916. Together, they had three children: Giancarlo (1918–2006), Gianmatteo (1921–2000), and Isabella (1922–1994). Matteotti's middle child, also known as Matteo, became a PSI parliamentary deputy after World War II. He was later a member of the Italian Democratic Socialist Party (PSDI) and the Italian Democratic Socialists (SDI). With the PSDI, he served as Italy's Minister of Tourism from 1970 to 1972 and Minister of Foreign Trade from 1972 to 1974. After his assassination in 1924, Matteotti's wife was under house arrest until September 1933; her heart and her health was broken and she died in 1938. Several people who helped her, such as Carlo Rosselli, were also imprisoned.

=== Education and early activism ===
After attending the public elementary school of Lendinara, Matteotti was enrolled in the Liceo Classico Celio (named after Caelius Rhodiginus) in Rovigo. The Liceo Classico Celio was also attended by other notable figures, including among others Umberto Merlin, historians Benvenuto and Roberto Cessi, and writer Guido Voghera. Matteotti had very good grades, and graduated on 15 December 1903 at the age of 18. Not much interested in the family business, he enrolled in the faculty of law at the University of Bologna, graduating on 7 November 1907 with 110 cum laude, presenting a thesis on recidivism written in collaboration with professor Alessandro Stoppato. To write his thesis, Matteotti travelled to the Netherlands, Belgium, Austria, Germany, France, and England, learning French, English, and German. He then revised his thesis in 1910, publishing La recidiva. Saggio di revisione critica con dati statistici (Recidivism: A Critical Review with Statistical Data) with Fratelli Bocca Editori in Turin, and during the same year made a trip to Oxford to study the British penal system. Between 1909 and 1910, he lost first his brother Matteo and then Silvio to tuberculosis, remaining the only surviving son.

Following the example of his brother Matteo, Matteotti approached socialist ideas from a very young age, joining the youth group of the Italian Socialist Party in 1898 at 13, and writing in 1901 his first article for a local weekly of socialist inspiration called La Lotta. An atheist, he was from early age an activist in the socialist movement and the PSI, which he joined around 1900. In a 1904 article in La Lotta, the socialist newspaper of Rovigo, he was described as the local PSI's reference point in Fratta Polesine. Also in a 1904 letter, Matteotti declared himself a militant socialist "for some time", and that he was committed to promoting clubs, leagues, and cooperatives for the rural proletariat of Polesine. In January 1908, he was elected to the municipal council of Fratta Polesine, and then by virtue of the existing law also of Villamarzana and Boara Polesine where he served as mayor, as well as Lendinara, Badia Polesine, and Bellino. Due to his opposition to Italian entry into World War I, he was interned in Sicily during the years of the Great War. As a result, he was excluded from the provincial council of Rovigo that he joined in 1910; however, he re-joined it after the 1920 Italian local elections, where the PSI as a whole achieved notable success, particularly in the Polesine region, where it won all comuni.

At his first political experience on 26 January 1908, at the age of 22, Matteotti was elected with 86 preferences as municipal councillor in Fratta Polesine. In August 1910 during his stay in Oxford, he was elected provincial councillor in Rovigo. Following the war in Libya, the gradualist current to which Matteotti belonged to, during the 13th Congress of the PSI in 1912, passed for the first time into a minority behind the maximalists (supporters of the maximum programme), when on the proposal of Mussolini, then director of Avanti!, the right wing of Leonida Bissolati and Ivanoe Bonomi was expelled and founded the Italian Reformist Socialist Party (PSRI). As a follower of Turati, Matteotti remained faithful to the party. On 3 October 1912, Matteotti was elected mayor of the small town of Villamarzana; in line with the law that allowed the possibility of being elected in all the towns where taxes were paid, he also entered the municipal councils of Villanova del Ghebbo, San Bellino, Castelguglielmo, Lendinara, Badia Polesine, Fiesso Umbertiano, Pincara, and Boara Polesine. Furthermore, he took the positions of deputy mayor of Fratta Polesine and assessor of Frassinelle Polesine. On 7 July 1914, Matteotti was re-elected to the provincial council. During those years, the opposing local Catholic press accused his parents of having built their fortune by lending money at interest.

=== World War I and exile in Sicily ===
On 26 July 1914, on the eve of the outbreak of the Great War, Mussolini published Abbasso la guerra! ("Down with the War!"), an editorial in the PSI daily newspaper Avanti! The following day, the same position was also taken up by Matteotti and the PSI parliamentary group, which still had a reformist majority. Matteotti saw the armed conflict as a clash among the national bourgeoisie that entailed the sacrifice of the proletariat. His neutralist position was reiterated several times also in the debates that took place in the provincial council of Rovigo, earning him accusation of being anti-Italian and also raising the criticism of the reformist socialist Nicola Badaloni . On 10 October 1914, Matteotti published an article in La Lotta in which he proposed for the first time the use of a proletarian insurrection to prevent Italy from entering the war, applauding the dissent to the war of Karl Liebknecht, the only one among the parliamentary group of the Social Democratic Party of Germany, and criticising Mussolini's position in favour of Italy entering the war alongside the Allies and the reasons for the government's neutrality. In February 1915, his idea of resorting to insurrection led him into a polemic with Turati, and from the columns of Critica Sociale he reiterated the impossibility of a foreign invasion and the use of any means to avoid the catastrophe of war.

Despite being the only surviving son of a widowed mother, Matteotti was called up for military service on 6 August 1916 and assigned to the 97th Company of the 4th Fortress Artillery Regiment, with the justification that as Rovigo was "in a state of war", it was "absolutely dangerous" that this "stubborn, violent agitator, capable of harming national interests at any moment" should continue to remain in such a delicate area. His anti-militarist positions and his activism against the war cost him his removal from Polesine for three years and his confinement in a mountainous area near Messina, in Campo Inglese, where he remained until March 1919.

== Political career ==
=== Election to the Chamber of Deputies and The Fascisti Exposed ===
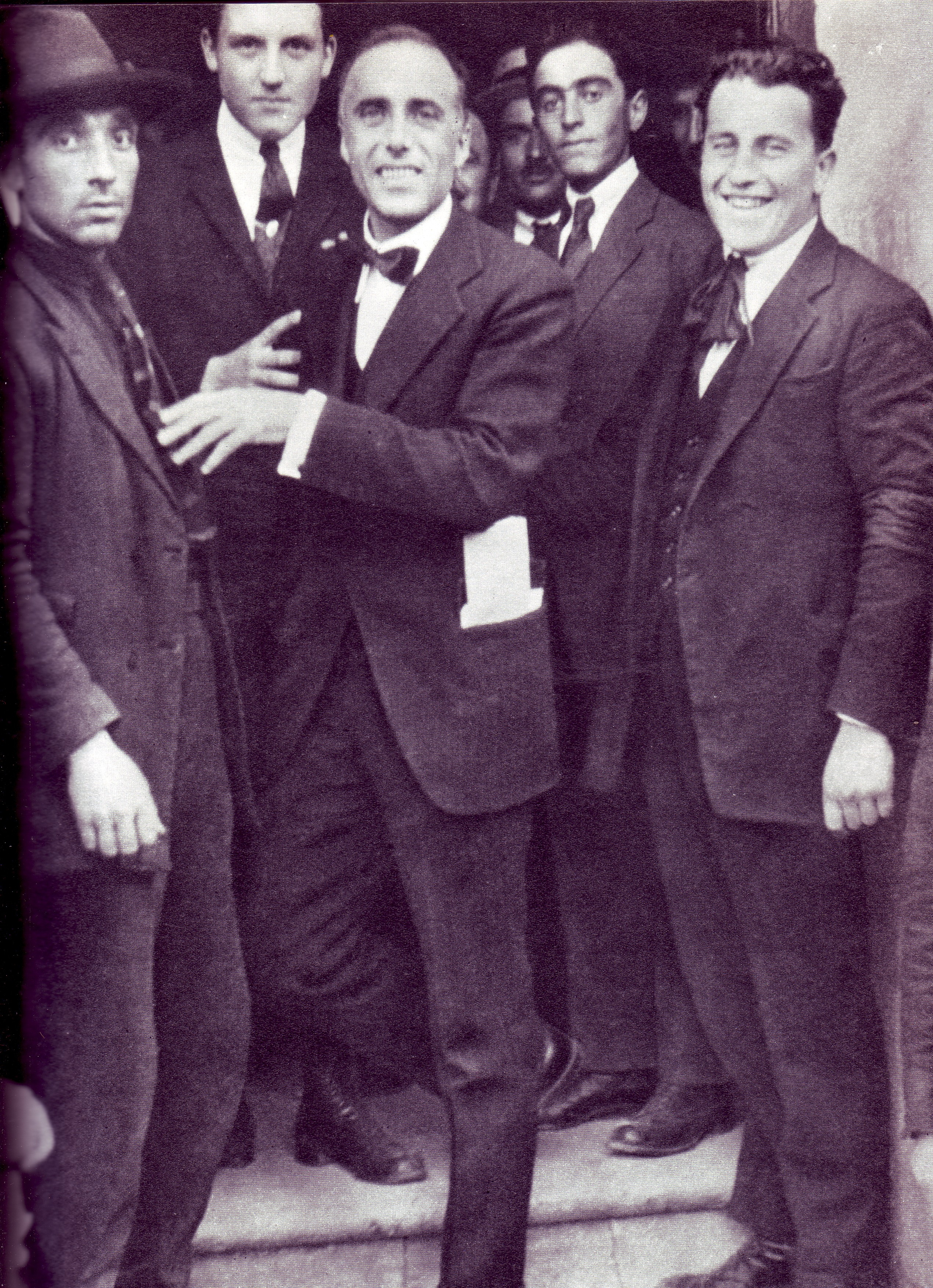
Matteotti with fellow supporters during the 1920s

Matteotti was elected deputy of the Chamber of Deputies three times, first in 1919 and then in 1921 and 1924. He advocated for agrarian reform and opposed protectionism. As a follower of Turati, Matteotti became the leader of the reformist PSU in the Chamber of Deputies after a split from the PSI. Matteotti openly spoke out against Italian fascism and Mussolini, and for a time was the de facto leader of the opposition to the PNF and the first opponent of Mussolini. In 1921, he denounced fascist violence in a pamphlet titled Inchiesta socialista sulle gesta dei fascisti in Italia (Socialist Enquiry on the Deeds of the Fascists in Italy).

A year before being killed, a warning against Matteotti appeared in the pages of Il Popolo d'Italia, the newspaper founded by Mussolini himself, where it read: "As for Matteotti, a vulgar mystificator, a notorious coward and a despicable panderer, he had better watch out. Indeed, if he happened to find himself, one day or another, with his head broken (really broken) he would certainly have no right to complain after such written and signed meanness." Matteotti quickly recognised the danger of the nascent fascist movement posed to workers' organisations; he viewed the rise of fascism as a reaction to the significant gains achieved through the peasant struggles of 1919–1920, and saw fascism as the agrarian bourgeoisie's violent response to its own interests being undermined by the new agrarian pacts.

In 1924, his book Un anno di dominazione fascista (The Fascisti Exposed: A Year of Fascist Domination) was published and he made two impassioned and lengthy speeches in the Chamber of Deputies denouncing fascism and declaring that the 1924 general election, where the PNF's National List obtained 65% of the vote and more than three-quarters of the seats, was invalid due to the documented intimidation and militia violence. In addition to violence and threats, the PNF won thanks to the Acerbo Law, which put in place an electoral system that guaranteed to the party that achieved at least 25% a two-thirds majority. As a result of this law, the PNF's National List obtained well over 60% of the seats.

In his speech to Parliament on 30 May 1924, Matteotti denounced fraud, Squadrismo, and Blackshirts violence. He strongly contested the violence by saying: "In Naples in one conference that the head of the constitutional opposition was to hold, he was prevented due to the mobilisation of the armed corps, which intervened in the city." He also said: "You who today hold power and strength in your hands, you who boast of your might, should be better able than anyone else to ensure that everyone obeys the law. You declare every day that you want to reestablish the authority of the state and the law. Do it, if you still have time; otherwise, you truly are ruining the very essence, the moral reason, of the nation." After the speech, Matteotti famously told his colleagues a phrase rendered in English as "Now start composing your oration for my funeral" or "I made my speech, now prepare the one for my funeral".

After his book was published in the early months of 1924, Matteotti was already working on a new edition of The Fascisti Exposed, which was to be updated in information and numbers, including its publication abroad, when he was assassinated. Before the assassination of Matteotti in 1924, Hanns-Erich Kaminski (who had been living in Italy for two years) published his book about fascism, based on articles appeared in Die Weltbühne and including Matteotti's writings. Kaminski incorrectly predicted the fall of fascism in 1925. The erroneous prediction of Mussolini's early downfall was not discussed again in Die Weltbühne. On 23 June, 13 days after Matteotti's assassination, Carl von Ossietzky presented Italy as a counterexample in his article comparing the murder of Matteotti to that of Walther Rathenau in 1922, stating that Italy was experiencing a change of political course, which ultimately did not materialise.

=== Italian Socialist Party and Unitary Socialist Party ===
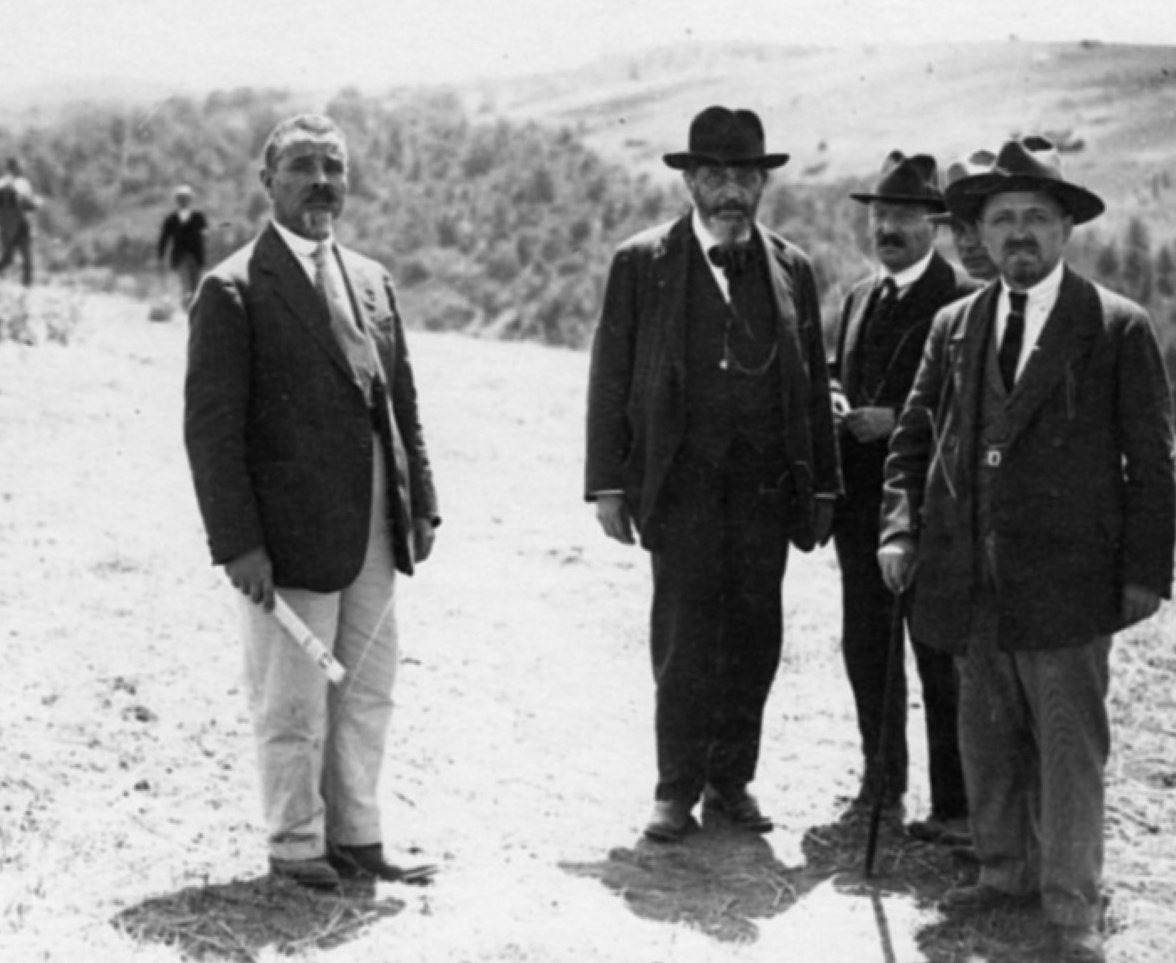
Enrico Gonzales, Filippo Turati, and Claudio Treves, all of which joined Matteotti's party, the PSU, in 1922

Matteotti was elected to the Italian Parliament for the first time in 1919 in the Ferrara constituency, and was then re-elected in 1921 (Padua) and in 1924 (Rovigo). It was during those years that he earned the nickname Tempesta ("Storm") by his fellow party members for his combative and uncompromising character. In a few years, in addition to preparing numerous bills and reports, he intervened 106 times in the Chamber of Deputies, with speeches on often technical, administrative, and financial topics. He tried to live up to the role of parliamentarian in the field that most interested him, namely the financial sector and public administration, for which he brought the legal preparation acquired at the University of Bologna, which made him an appreciated jurist, as well as the experience acquired in the pre-war years as mayor and local administrator in the province of Rovigo. His spending rigour, the credibility of public finances, and his support for the fair distribution of the tax burden and the need to introduce more clarity in legislation made him a notable national and international figure" Due to his meticulous character and habit of studying, as recalled by Oddino Morgari, he spent hours in the Library of the Chamber of Deputies "browsing through books, reports, statistics, from which he drew the data he needed to fight, with words and with the pen, taking care to always remain grounded in things".

Matteotti's national political career began in a context of growing social tension, culminating in the factory occupations of September 1920 and the split within the Italian left brought about by the 2nd World Congress of the Communist International (Comintern). The congress summarised the conditions for joining the Comintern in 21 points (the Twenty-one Conditions), the 7th of which called for "a complete break with reformism and centrist politics" and the expulsion of "known opportunists", among whom the Italians Turati and Giuseppe Modigliani were specifically mentioned. The 17th point required each party to change its name to the Communist Party, followed by the name of its respective country. The PSI was then divided into three currents: reformists, maximalists, and communists. The reformist group of Matteotti and Turati met in Reggio Emilia on 11–12 October 1920, without clearly outlining its gradualist line. At the Rome Congress in October 1922, the entire reformist and gradualist current linked to Turati was expelled from the PSI; the defectors founded the new PSU, of which Matteotti became secretary.

Matteotti was present at the first day of the Livorno Congress in January 1921, a congress that ended with the communist split and the birth of the Communist Party of Italy (PCd'I). Matteotti, who had already commented on the prospect of a split in a previous article (La Lotta, 18 December 1920) hoping that the divisions within the ruling groups would at least spare the unions, left Livorno early to go to Ferrara, where the PSI leadership group had been arrested following the massacre at the Estense Castle; in a situation of strong tension, he temporarily assumed the role of secretary of the city's Chamber of Labour. This produced awareness of the involutive dangers that were gathering over Italian society and institutions, a renewed commitment to his anti-fascist struggle, and frequent denunciations of the violence that was being carried out. In the Chamber of Labour on 31 January 1921, Matteotti issued a motion that was put to the vote four days later and rejected; he warned that the bourgeois ruling class had the duty to put an end to "this little counter-revolution of yours, which is preparing the way for civil war".

=== Fascist violence ===
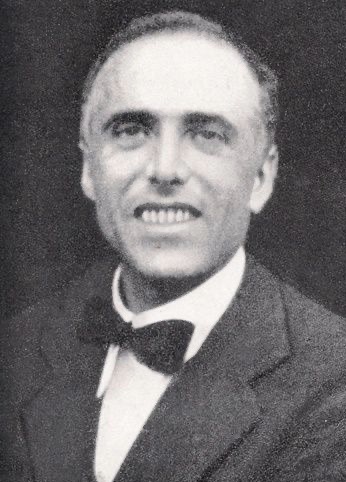
Matteotti in the early 1920s when he published his first writings about fascist violence

In 1921, Matteotti published Socialist Enquiry on the Deeds of the Fascists in Italy, in which he denounced for the first time the violence of the fascist action squads during the general election campaign, where he was himself a victim of a fascist attack. At the following congress in Milan in October 1921, the PSI split between the concentrationist component of Turati and Baldesi and the one in favour of joining the Comintern. Matteotti, although hoping for an end to the divisions, sided with the concentrationist fraction, not so much because of his proximity to reformism but rather because of his rejection of the Bolshevik revolutionary model.

In 1924, the translation of his book The Fascists Exposed was published in London, where Matteotti had gone in strictly confidential form in April 1924, with the title The Fascists Exposed: A Year of Fascist Domination, in which he reported the acts of fascist violence against their opponents. In the introduction to the book, Matteotti responded to the fascist statements, in particular those that affirmed the use of fascist violence useful for the purpose of bringing the country back to a situation of legality and "normality" with the restoration of the authority of the state after the Biennio Rosso, affirming the continuation of fascist milita expeditions against opponents even after a year of fascist government. Furthermore, he maintained that the improvement in the economic and financial conditions of the country, which was slowly recovering from the devastation of the Great War, was not due to fascist action but to popular energy; according to Matteotti, only speculators and capitalists benefitted from it, while the middle and proletarian classes received a proportionally low share in exchange for the sacrifices.

=== 30 May 1924 speech to the Italian Parliament ===
In the general election held on 6 April 1924, Matteotti was re-elected and the PSU obtained 6 percent of the vote, resulting in the second opposition party behind the 9 percent of the Italian People's Party (PPI). The electoral campaign took place in a serious climate of intimidation and repeated violence by the action squads of PNF, and the results were therefore largely favourable to the fascist government list, with the election of all its 356 candidates. During the electoral campaign in Cefalù, Matteotti himself suffered a fascist attack. When it came time to validate the Election Committee's decisions, several minority parliamentarians in the Chamber of Deputies raised protests over the voting procedures in some constituencies (Abruzzo, Campania, Calabria, Apulia, and Sicily). Matteotti, along with members of Parliament Enrico Presutti and Arturo Labriola, then submitted a request to have the documents referred to the Election Committee. On 30 May 1924, Matteotti addressed the Chamber of Deputies to contest the election results, denouncing the violence, illegalities, and abuses committed by fascists in their bid to win the election. During his speech, he was frequently interrupted by shouted threats from the PNF deputies, and in the end the PNF deputies cheered an annoyed Mussolini by shouting Duce.

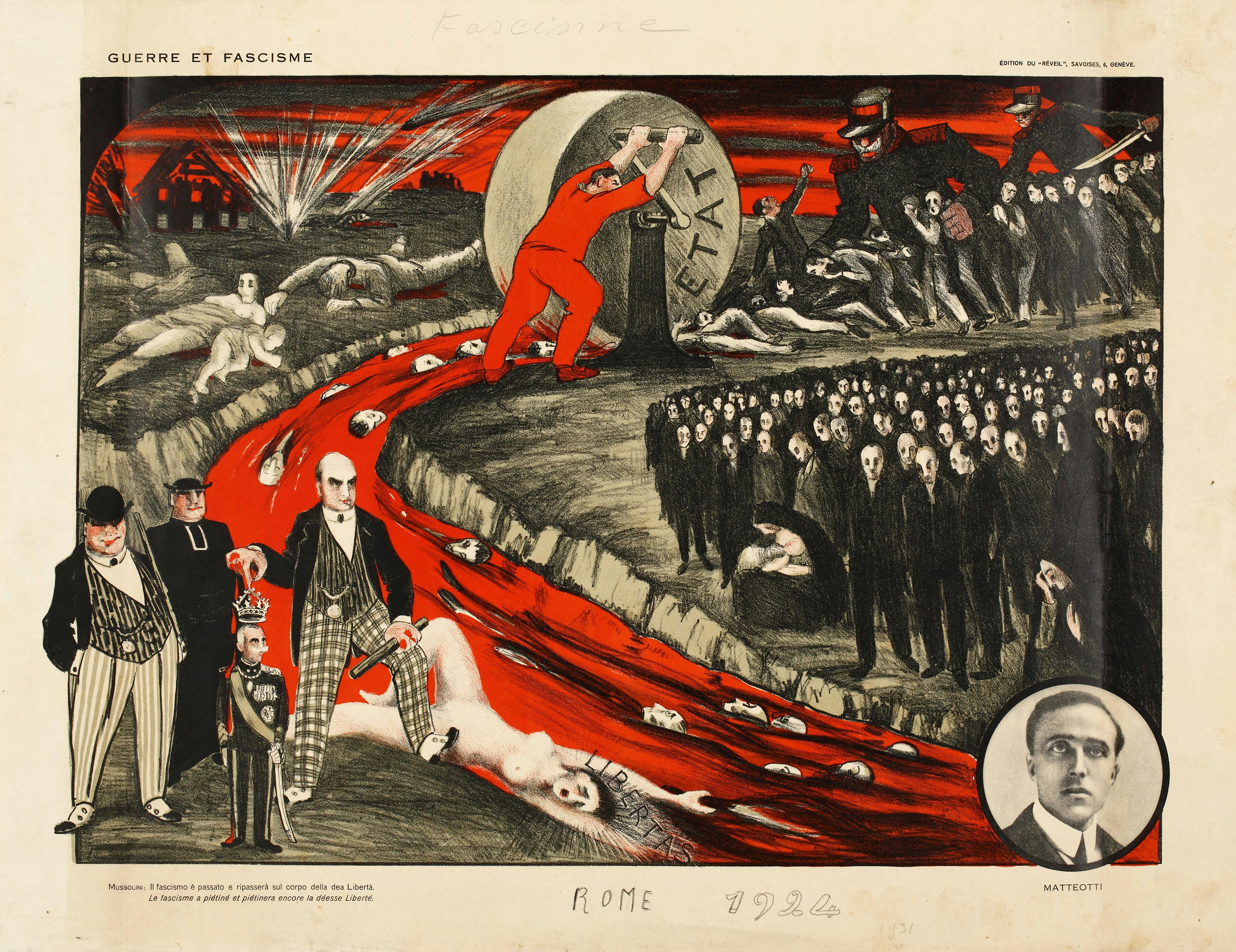
Guerre et Fascisme, 1924

Contestiamo in questo luogo e in tronco la validità delle elezioni della maggioranza. ... L'elezione secondo noi è essenzialmente non valida, e aggiungiamo che non è valida in tutte le circoscrizioni. ... Per vostra stessa conferma [dei parlamentari fascisti] dunque nessun elettore italiano si è trovato libero di decidere con la sua volontà... ... Vi è una milizia armata, composta di cittadini di un solo Partito, la quale ha il compito dichiarato di sostenere un determinato Governo con la forza, anche se ad esso il consenso mancasse.

— Italian original of Matteotti's speech to Parliament on 30 May 1924

We challenge here and now the validity of the majority elections ... According to us, the election is essentially invalid, and we add that it is invalid in all constituencies ... For your own confirmation [of fascist parliamentarians], no Italian voter was free to decide with his will ... There is an armed militia, composed of citizens of a single party, which has the declared task of supporting a specific government by force, even if it lacks consent.

— English translation of Matteotti's speech to Parliament on 30 May 1924

Having finished his speech, Matteotti addressed Giovanni Cosattini who was sitting next to him, famously telling his fellow party members "I have made my speech. Now you prepare the funeral speech for me" (Io, il mio discorso l'ho fatto. Ora voi preparate il discorso funebre per me). According to others, the exact phrase (always addressed to Cosattini) was "And now prepare to give me a eulogy" (Ed ora preparatevi a farmi l'elogio funebre) or "And now, you can prepare my funeral" (Ed ora, potete preparare il mio funerale). Matteotti's proposal to invalidate the election of at least one group of deputies illegitimately elected because of violence and fraud was rejected by the Chamber of Deputies with 285 votes against, 57 in favour, and 42 abstentions.

On 1 June, Il Popolo d'Italia published an article on the front page, in which Matteotti was explicitly indicated as the main opponent. The article was not signed but was written by Mussolini; a copy of the manuscript was kept by his secretary Arturo Fasciolo who in 1926 was sanctioned for the "documents of a confidential nature taken from the head of government". It read that "Mussolini found the majority's conduct too long-suffering because the Hon. Matteotti gave a monstrously provocative speech that would have deserved something more tangible than the epithet of 'gang' launched by the Hon. Giunta." During a discussion in the Chamber of Deputies on 4 June, Matteotti had an argument with Mussolini, reminding him of the approval given in 1919 by Il Popolo d'Italia to the decree of amnesty for deserters.

== Assassination ==
=== Kidnapping and murder ===
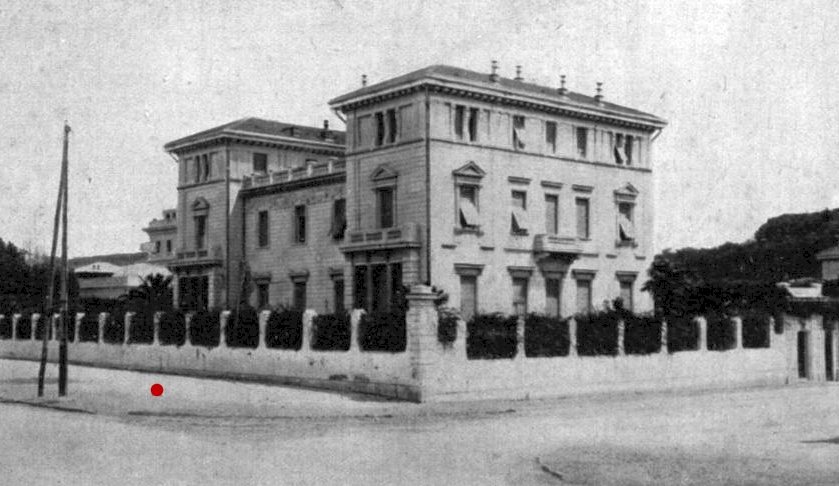
Location of Matteotti's kidnapping

On 10 June, around 4 pm, Matteotti was bundled into a black Lancia, more specifically the Lancia Lambda limousine model, by five men while he was walking to Parliament to work. They were Dumini, Albino Volpi, Giuseppe Viola, Amleto Poveromo, and Augusto Malacria, all acting as members of Mussolini's secret political police. Matteotti had left his house and was heading towards the Chamber of Deputies to prepare his speech on the authorisation of the provisional exercise of the state budget.

When Matteotti reached the Lungotevere, he came across the black Lancia parked with some people on board; waiting for him was the fascist squad of Dumini, who kidnapped Matteotti, loaded him into the car, and then stabbed him during the beating that took place in the car. Inside the car, Matteotti was stabbed several times with a carpenter's file as he struggled to escape.

The morning of 11 June, Matteotti's wife, worried by his prolonged absence, decided to warn his closest party members including Turati and Modigliani, who on the evening of 11 June reported Matteotti's disappearance to the police commissioner Cesare Bertini, who had already been informed of the incident by De Bono. On the morning of 12 June, the news became public knowledge. In the afternoon, Mussolini made a statement to the Chamber of Deputies, generating protests from the parliamentary opposition. Also on 12 June, the first arrests began, and continued in the following days. On 27 June, the opposition commemorated Matteotti's death, officially starting the Aventine Secession, and throughout Italy many workers abstained from work for about ten minutes.

Matteotti's body was found only on 16 August 1924 in the countryside of the municipality of Riano, around 23 kilometres north of Rome. He was 39, and the discovery of Matteotti's body seems to have been accidental as it was sniffed by the dog of a Carabinieri sergeant on leave near the countryside of Riano. As two months had passed since his disappearance, the body was already decomposing, so a dental examination was necessary to identify him.

On 17 August, the Corriere della Sera wrote: "What is most important to note is the devastation wrought on the body by forcing it to occupy a grave so short compared to its length. The late MP was, in fact, one meter and seventy centimeters tall, while the grave was less than one meter and thirty centimeters long. Those who buried him undoubtedly must have broken his legs or pressed his head into his rib cage." On 21 August, the body arrived in Fratta Polesine where the funeral took place. Matteotti's tomb is located in front of the main entrance to the Fratta Polesine cemetery in the family chapel.

=== International reactions ===
The news of the kidnapping and assassination of Matteotti quickly spread around the world. In France, both the government and the National Assembly held Mussolini responsible for the murder, prompting Mussolini to send a telegram to all embassies announcing that the police had already arrested almost all the suspects. This did not stop the international press, including among others from Austria, Brazil, Germany, Japan, Spain, and Sweden, from strongly criticising Mussolini and cause a diplomatic crisis in Italy from which Mussolini was not prepared. In turn, Mussolini made generalised attacks on "those who want to humiliate Italy", threatening severe retaliation in the pages of Il Popolo d'Italia.

The Soviet Union had a rather lukewarm reaction to Mussolini. According to the Italian ambassador to Moscow, "the press has limited itself to reproducing brief telegrams from Rome without any comment ... there has been no demonstration so far from the Russian government or public opinion." In the United States, Matteotti's kidnapping did not affect its favourable views of Mussolini, and responsibility for the crime was largely attributed to out-of-control fascists, while it assumed Mussolini's good faith and recognised him for his willingness to capture the assassins. Similarly, politically moderates and conservatives assumed Mussolini's good faith, having supported him for keeping the left-wing parties and movements out of government. The Holy See implicitly supported the fascist government during the Matteotti Crisis, which nearly brought it down.

=== Matteotti Crisis and Aventine Secession ===
The assassination of Matteotti sparked shock and widespread criticism of fascism and of Mussolini, including from the Italian liberals who had supported the PNF. For example, prominent liberal and future Italian President Luigi Einaudi switched to the parliamentary opposition over Matteotti's murder. On 6 August 1924, he wrote an article on the front page of the Corriere della Sera, Italy's newspaper of record, denouncing the guilty silence of financiers and industrialists in the face of fascism's continued and violent repression of opponents. The murder of Matteotti also influenced Adolfo Omodeo of the nature of Mussolini and fascism. Although he did not fully distance from fascism until 1928, the murder of Matteotti led him to start distancing from his teacher Giovanni Gentile, one of the symbolic figures of early fascism, and that this was painful for him as he unsuccessfully tried to turn on fascism and join the opposition. The assassination of Matteotti had a significant effect on Bonomi, who moved closer to the liberal-democratic opposition movement around Amendola but he had been nothing more than a completely "harmless opponent" of fascism as Mussolini contemptuously called him during the 1920s and 1930s. After the fall of Mussolini, when Bonomi led the government after Pietro Badoglio's resignation, many socialists had not forgotten that Bonomi, a right-wing social democrat, conservative monarchist, and staunch anti-communist, had played a role in the early 1920s when he accepted support from fascists in elections, protected Mussolini's squads as Minister of the Interior, and failed in the face of the challenge of fascism as Prime Minister of Italy.

In the days following Matteotti's disappearance, it became clear Matteotti had been assassinated on the order of people at the top of the regime, prompting the outrage of the opposition. Within a fortnight of the murder, Mauro Del Giudice, the judge appointed to investigate the crime, had ordered the arrest of high-profile members of Mussolini's inner circle and questions were asked about Mussolini's personal involvement. In May 2022, the then Italian Senator Gianni Marilotti said that in those weeks "fascism fielded an articulated series of misdirections, obstructions of justice, and red herrings to declare the moral question closed." After a few weeks of confusion, Mussolini gained a favourable vote from the Senate of the Kingdom of Italy, and liberals like Benedetto Croce and other future anti-fascists voted in favour of the government in the vote of confidence, with Croce stating it was a "prudent and patriotic" vote. This came in a political climate where the Italian bourgeoisie and many Catholics still feared Bolshevism and thought that Mussolini was a better alternative. As a result of the government's resiliency, all opposition parties and their 123 deputies united to agree to abandon parliamentary proceedings until the government had clarified what had happened to Matteotti in what became known as the Aventine Secession, a reference to the secessio plebis in Ancient Rome, where the plebeians retired during the Conflict of the Orders with the patricians.

The Aventine Secession was an attempt to give strength to the "moral question" that would point to public disapproval of fascism but also to put pressure on King Victor Emmanuel III to dismiss Mussolini and call new elections; however, the King refused to act since the Mussolini government was supported by a large majority of the Chamber of Deputies and almost all the Senate of the Kingdom. Moreover, he feared that compelling Mussolini to resign could be considered a coup that could eventual lead to a civil war between the Royal Italian Army and the Blackshirts. Historian Alessandro Barbero deemed the Aventine Secession a mistake, stating that abandoning Parliament was "catastrophic"; Gramsci and the rest of the Communists remained in Parliament, while Sturzo went into exile and Turati said that the socialist workers' movement had "gone into hiding". Historian Gabriele De Rosa wrote that when the Matteotti murder was discovered, the democratic parties "were already ready to move onto the terrain of testimony, of ethical protest, in the desperate hope of creating a vacuum around fascism, of isolating it from the common conscience of citizens."

During the summer, the trial against Matteotti's alleged murderers and the discovery of the corpse of Matteotti once again spread rage against Mussolini as newspapers launched fierce attacks against him and the fascist movement. On 13 September, Armando Casalini, a deputy and PNF member, was killed on a tramway in retaliation for Matteotti's murder by the anti-fascist Giovanni Corvi . During the autumn of 1924, the extremist wing of the PNF threatened Mussolini with a coup and dealt with him on the night of San Silvestro (New Year's Eve) in 1924. Mussolini devised a counter-manoeuvre with a speech to Parliament on 3 January 1925. In the speech, he attacked the anti-fascists and confirmed that he and only he was the leader of Italian fascism. He challenged the anti-fascists to prosecute him and claimed proudly that fascism was the "superb passion of the best youth of Italy" and grimly that "all the violence" was his responsibility because he had created the climate of violence. Admitting that the murderers were fascists of "high station", as Adolf Hitler later did after the Night of the Long Knives, Mussolini rhetorically claimed fault by stating "If fascism has been a band of criminals, I am the leader of this criminal band" (Se il fascismo è un'associazione a delinquere, io ne sono il capo). Mussolini further retorted: "If fascism has been a criminal association, if all the violence has been the result of a determined historical, political, moral delinquency, the responsibility for this is on me, because I have created it with my propaganda from the time of our intervention in the war up to this moment ... I assume, I alone, the political, moral, historical responsibility for everything that has happened. If sentences, more or less maimed, are enough to hang a man, out with the noose!" Mussolini concluded with the warning that Italy needed stability and that fascism would assure stability to Italy in any manner necessary.

Matteotti's murder followed the 1921 murders of Spartaco Lavagnini (a communist trade unionist) and Giuseppe di Vagno (a PSI deputy from Apulia), and the 1923 murder of priest Giovanni Minzoni. Although Matteotti was not the first nor the last victim of fascism, his murder was particularly notable due to occurring not long after his speech to Parliament and in broad daylight, and was a watershed in Fascist Italy due to the Mussolini government issuing the Fascistissime laws in 1926 that fully established an authoritarian dictatorship. By 1938, Mussolini had exiled, jailed, or killed the various major opposition leaders, including Christian democrats like Luigi Sturzo (exiled) and future Italian Prime Minister Alcide De Gasperi (jailed), liberals like Piero Gobetti and Giovanni Amendola (died as a result of fascist squad attacks), and communists like Amadeo Bordiga (exiled) and Antonio Gramsci (died in prison).

=== Trials and Mussolini's alleged involvement in the murder ===
Five men (Dumini, the operational leader of the fascist secret police; Viola, Volpi, Malacria, and Poveromo) were arrested a few days after the kidnapping. Another suspect, Filippo Panzeri, fled from arrest. Only three men (Dumini, Volpi, and Poveromo) were convicted in 1926 and shortly after released under an amnesty approved the previous summer by the Mussolini government.

Mario Berlinguer of the Action Party was responsible for the judicial prosecution of fascist crimes at the High Commission. Berlinguer investigated the darkest aspects of fascist jurisprudence and on his request the Court of cassation declared the lenient sentences against those fascists who had murdered Matteotti and other opponents of the regime in the 1920s and 1930s, such as Amendola and Minzoni, to be "non-existent". After the war, the trial against Francesco Giunta, Cesare Rossi, Dumini, Viola, Poveromo, Malacria, Filippelli, and Panzeri was re-opened in 1947. Dumini, Viola, and Poveromo were sentenced to life imprisonment. Due to trial extinction for the death of Mussolini (a defendant), this trial could not examine evidence of Mussolini's involvement.

The involvement of Mussolini in the assassination is much debated and historians suggested different theories over the years. While many historians including Emilio Gentile and Denis Mack Smith expressed their belief that Matteotti's speech to Parliament was the cause of his murder, some historians like Renzo De Felice, a prominent biographer of Mussolini and historical revisionist, disagreed. In 1940, John Gunther wrote, "Most critics nowadays do not think that the Duce directly ordered the assassination ... but his moral responsibility is indisputable", perhaps with underlings believing they were carrying out Mussolini's desire by performing the kidnapping and murder on their own or that it was an unintentional homicide resulting from intentional harm ("preterintentional homicide"). In the words of Mussolini biographer Antonio Scurati in 2024, "Mussolini was immediately informed. He tried to cover up evidence of the crime by every means possible, blatantly lying about it in front of Parliament. In addition to the crime, he also committed the infamy of swearing to the widow that he would do everything possible to bring her husband back. While he swore, the Duce of fascism kept the victim's blood-stained documents in his desk drawer."

The socialist and anti-fascist journalist Carlo Silvestri was a strong contemporary critic and accuser of Mussolini in the Matteotti murder. He later joined the Italian Social Republic (RSI), a puppet state of Nazi Germany, helped anti-fascist exiles and victims through the Silvestri Red Cross, and acted as a mediator between the RSI and the Italian resistance movement; he stated that he joined the RSI after Mussolini had shown him the papers for the Matteotti case (these papers were captured by partisans with the other documents of Mussolini, and the folders with Matteotti's files were sent from Milan to Rome but never arrived), and eventually he changed his mind about Mussolini's involvement. While stating in response to critics that he was not defending Mussolini and that this did not cancel his criticism of fascism, he believed in Mussolini's innocence, which earned him criticism from other anti-fascists in the post-war period. Silvestri suggested that Matteotti was killed as a result of a capitalist plot, describing Matteotti's murder as decidedly anti-working class and anti-socialist, in order to damage Mussolini's attempt to form government with the participation of the PSI and the PPI and cover some scandals in which the Crown (with the American oil company Sinclair Oil) was involved, about which Matteotti had been writing and wanted to uncover in a speech; Arnaldo Mussolini, Mussolini's younger brother, was implicated in the affair. In an interview with Marcello Staglieno in 1985, Matteotti's son Gianmatteo expressed support for this theory.

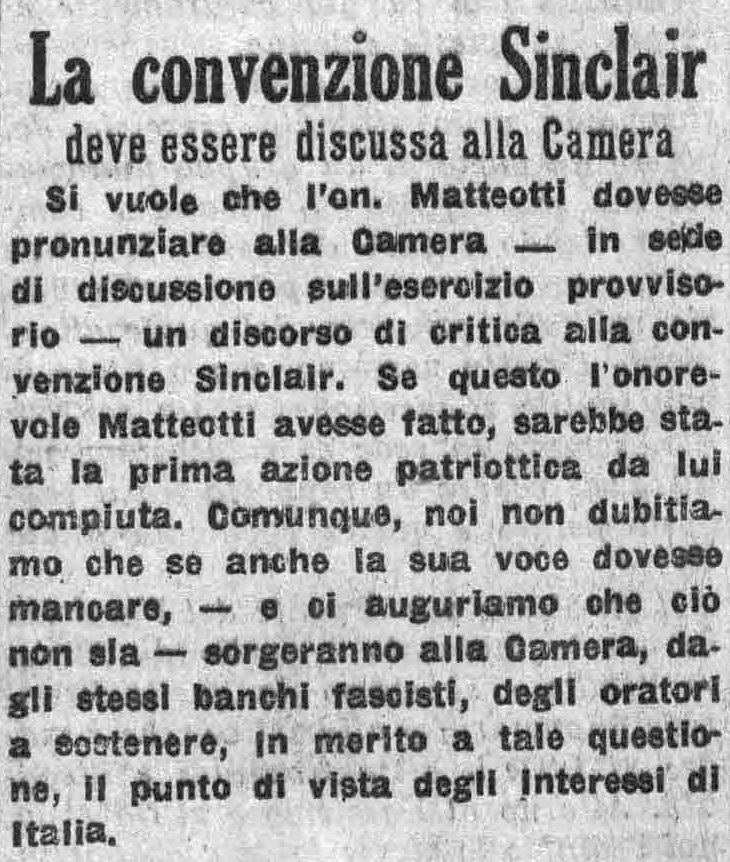
According to the pro-fascist newspaper Nuovo Paese, the day Matteotti was kidnapped and murdered, he was due to discuss the Sinclair affair in the Chamber of Deputies.

De Felice argued that Mussolini was a political victim of a plot and that he was damaged by the crisis that followed the murder as many fascists left the party and his government was about to collapse. De Felice said that Matteotti publicly condemned the alliance of the socialist trade unions and the fascist counterpart. Moreover, he argued that Matteotti may have found evidence of bribes from Sinclair Oil in favour of Mussolini in order to get permission for Sinclair's exploitation of petroleum reservoirs under Italian control and was deemed dangerous by Mussolini for his links to the British Labour Party. De Felice did not have a chance to study many documents pertaining to the inquest over the murder as they were not easily available at the time of his research. Mauro Canali, a full professor of Contemporary History at the University of Camerino, suggested that Mussolini probably ordered the murder as Matteotti uncovered and wanted to make public incriminating documents proving that Mussolini and his associates sold Sinclair Oil Corporation exclusive rights to all Italian oil reserves. Judge Giovanni Spagnuolo, in relation to the business clue linked to the Sinclair Oil agreement, added in his 1946 indictment, refuting it in detail, that this "hypothesis clashes with the most elementary logic". Similarly, historian Mirko Grasso argued against this hypothesis, stating in 2024 that "there's no point in seeking further motives or leads that aren't supported by the documents. In the age of conspiracy theories, the oil trail, for example, is all the rage ... It's a compelling lead, but there's no documentation. We'll never find a note in which Mussolini says, 'Get rid of him.' We should rather ask ourselves why Matteotti met his end."

== Political thought ==
=== Intransigent reformism ===
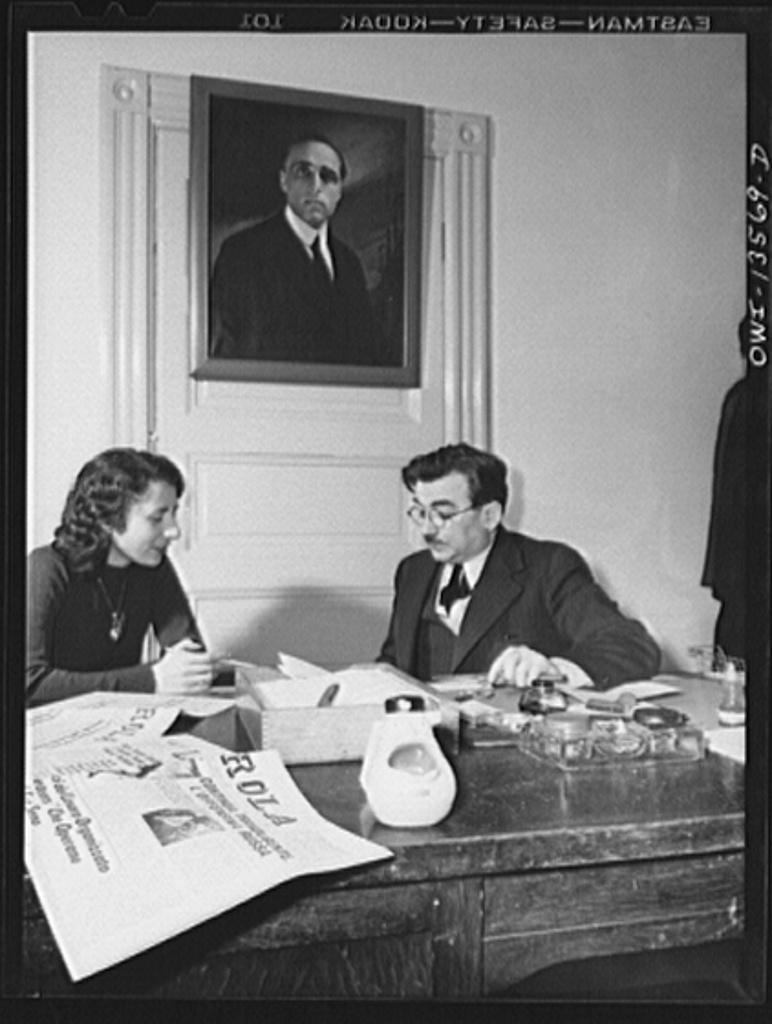
Girolamo Valente, an American anti-fascist editor of the progressive Italian weekly La Parola in New York City conferring with his secretary, with a portrait of Matteotti on the wall

An adherent to the reformist current of Turati, Matteotti in his activity as a municipal administrator during the pre-war period developed a pedagogical and moral conception of socialism. Although he aspired to revolution like the maximalists, Matteotti advocated a form of socialism from below. He believed that the socialist revolution should develop from below through the education of the people to a solidaristic and non-individualistic conception of personal relationships, affirming that "overthrowing the bourgeoisie is the least of it. The most is building and preparing socialism within ourselves." In order to elevate the weakest strata of society, Matteotti considered making use of three fundamental instruments: the school, the municipality, and the trade unions.

For Matteotti, the school had as its fundamental aim that of educating, instructing, and civilising the masses, and not to be considered only as a method of selection of the ruling class. Matteotti therefore considered it fundamental that everyone could have access to nursery schools and primary schools, which were often insufficient in rural areas both in terms of the number of classrooms and teachers. During his parliamentary career, he denounced the high rate of illiteracy in rural areas, and stood in defence of primary school teachers by requesting more equal remuneration. Regarding Italian universities, Matteotti thought that they were not sufficiently specialised, complaining about the large quantity of general institutes and the low quality of teaching. He also proposed to organise educational trips for the workers of the leagues, observing that "socialism does not mean wine and taverns; but above all it is an aspiration for the intellectual and moral elevation of the working class".

Matteotti was an advocate of municipalism. He saw the municipality as the means to be able, starting from the base, to reverse the balance of power between the working class and the bourgeois class, being at the same time the place where civic sense could be developed. During his activity as an administrator, he was always scrupulous in the care of the budgets, establishing from time to time the economic feasibility of the social interventions to be carried out. According to Matteotti, the socialist administration of the municipality differed significantly from the bourgeois one, stating that "this organ of public power in the hands of the conservatives very often turns into a perfect instrument of domination, we must aspire to it in order to transform it into a provident function of patrimony in the interest of the proletariat."

For Matteotti, the trade union leagues and the party were the instrument for disciplining the working masses and providing them with a class consciousness, so that they could then carry out the revolution by clashing with the employers' and ecclesiastical classes. During the Biennio Rosso, Matteotti assumed an ambivalent position towards the trade union leagues, exalting their revolutionary demands during rallies but acting as a reformist in Parliament. He held similar views on the Russian Revolution, justifying the use of violence and going as far as contesting private property. On the other hand, particularly since the 1919 Bologna Congress, he feared the risk that a revolution from above would lead to a new autocratic regime, opposing it with the idea of a revolution patiently prepared from below. He soon became disillusioned with the methods of the Bolshevik Revolution and its outcome, and in particular Soviet violence appeared to him useless for the purpose of building socialism.

During the meeting of the reformist current to discuss the conditions for joining the Comintern, held in Reggio Emilia in October 1920, Matteotti tried to guarantee the autonomy of the PSI and at the same time its membership in the Comintern. In his speech, he argued that the establishment of socialism required a long time and that recourse to violence could be justified "only within the minimum of necessity that the conservative militarist reaction imposed", foreseeing "a transitory political dictatorship of the proletariat" that should "never be understood as a dictatorship of the few over the proletariat". Matteotti's speech was considered a confused one that made his "revolutionary reformism" appear less elaborate than that of Turati, representing a middle way between revolution and reform that dissatisfied the supporters of both.

=== Democratic socialism and social democracy ===
Starting in 1921, with the rise of fascism in Italy, Matteotti began to condemn the use of violence as a revolutionary instrument, and only allowed it in self-defence against fascist violence. Faced with fascist illegality, Matteotti placed himself in defence of democratic institutions, identifying the parliament as the place in which to bring forward the demands of the workers' movement. In direct opposition to fascism, Matteotti worked more and more actively to create an anti-fascist bloc that included both maximalists and Christian democrats (through the current of Popolarismo), and as a result he was violently attacked and persecuted by fascists. In a 1923 speech to the Chamber of Deputies, Matteotti expressed his hope for the formation of a United States of Europe, which was understood as a union of peoples and workers. He said: "We urge the formation of the United States of Europe; not by postponing it ideally until after socialism, but by hastening it practically because it represents a foretaste of socialism, a stepping stone to socialism, a recognition and brotherhood among the diverse workers of all nations, eliminating many apparently national, but essentially capitalist, deviations and conflicts."

In April 1923, Matteotti illustrated his political positions in a pamphlet distributed among the PSU leaders, effectively laying the ideological foundations of post-war Italian democratic socialism and social democracy. Matteotti expressed the repudiation of violence as a form of struggle as a fundamental condition for belonging to the party, identifying the democratic method and political freedom as the main instrument of action. He thus identified the class struggle as the defence of work through political action for the good of the community and the fair division of profits in order to progressively eliminate class hatred. From the perspective of socialist internationalism, Matteotti promoted diplomatic activities aimed at avoiding conflicts by supporting the League of Nations and the formation of the United States of Europe, while at the same time recognising the existence of the nation. Taking a stand against the overthrow of the state, he promoted instead the gradual increase of the influence of the working class within the state, whose institutions must act impartially and not be at the service of the ruling class. Matteotti also proposed the overcoming of capitalism with a collective economy, understanding the increase in production as a collective heritage. At the end of the pamphlet, Matteotti reaffirmed his vision of socialism, which towards the worker "intends and works to raise him and lead him to economic and intellectual improvements, to ever higher social freedom and spiritual freedom. That is, it wants to form and realise in him the man who lives, as a brother and not as a wolf, with men, in a better humanity, through solidarity and justice."

=== Matteotti and Bolshevik communism ===
Matteotti's refusal of political violence expressed in this final phase led him to split with the newly formed PCd'I. In 1922, shortly before the Rome Congress that sanctioned the expulsion of the reformists and the birth of the PSU, Matteotti's comment on the risk of new splits in La Lotta identified political violence as the characterising element of Bolshevik communism, stating: "If there are those who believe only in violence, let them leave and go to the Communists. If there are those who feel close to the bourgeois parties, which today have all denied their democracy, let them move to the Bonomi group." As secretary of the PSU, convinced that fascist illegality had to be defeated with legality, Matteotti excluded the PCd'I from his plans for an anti-fascist alliance, which also included the maximalists of the PSI and the PPI led by Sturzo. Divided from the Communists by socialist humanism and respect for individual freedoms and constitutional guarantees, he rejected the Communist proposal to form a "united front of proletarian opposition to fascism" ahead 1924 general election. In reply to the letter sent to him by Palmiro Togliatti on 23 January, he rejected the three conditions set by the Communists: accepting the Communist tactical approach, which was antithetical to the PSU "as demonstrated by the constant, often offensive, polemics against us"; participating in the elections under any conditions, abandoning the idea of electoral abstention (deemed by Matteotti to be the most effective form of protest against the regime); and exclude an opposition to fascism aimed at the "pure and simple restoration of statutory liberties" and open to the participation of non-worker parties.

In the same letter, Matteotti observed: "To place such preconditions before an agreement – which in our opinion should aim, first and foremost, at the conquest of elementary political liberties and at leading the proletariat out of the current tragic situation – means not only making the agreement absolutely impossible, but also making any discussion futile. If this was your aim, you have undoubtedly achieved it. But you will not be permitted the usual convenient manoeuvre to unload on us the responsibility, which is yours, of having divided and weakened the Italian proletariat in the moments of greatest oppression and danger." According to historian Gianpaolo Romanato, Matteotti's plans for agreements with other political forces "always excluded the Communists" and Matteotti "who, not coincidentally, never went to Moscow despite his passion for travel (and joked about the 'pilgrims of Moscow,' as socialists inspired by Leninism then called themselves), always expressed a total, almost contemptuous, rejection of the Communists, of the Bolshevik Party."

The response of Matteotti did not surprise Togliatti, who had already written on January 18 to the secretariat of the Comintern that Communist propaganda was based "on the criticism of bourgeois democracy" and on the assumption that "fascism has opened up a period of permanent revolution for the proletariat and the proletarian party which forgets this point and continues to nourish among the workers the illusion of a possibility of changing the present situation by maintaining itself on the terrain of a liberal and constitutional opposition will, in the final analysis, give points of support to the enemies of the Italian working and peasant class." In a letter to Turati written shortly before the 1924 general election, Matteotti highlighted the need to re-establish socialist unity with the maximalists of the PSI, which was also now "clearly at odds with Moscow", and expressed his strong criticism of Soviet communism by stating that "it is not allowed to keep the Italian working class divided. The enemy at present is only one: fascism. The involuntary accomplice of fascism is communism. The violence and dictatorship preached by one becomes the pretext and justification for the violence and dictatorship in action of the other. Italian workers, taught by the harsh experiences of the post-war period, must unite in harmony, against the fascism that oppresses and against the insidious communist discord." Matteotti's assessment of the interdependent relationship between fascism and Bolshevik communism is similar to that expressed a few months earlier by Amendola, who stated: "In the end, the Communists are our own epigones of the Russian experiment ... and—fanatics of their own views to the ultimate consequences—while legitimising Lenin's dictatorship with their support, they also legitimise the fascist dictatorship in Italy, even while fighting it."

== Legacy ==
=== Memory ===
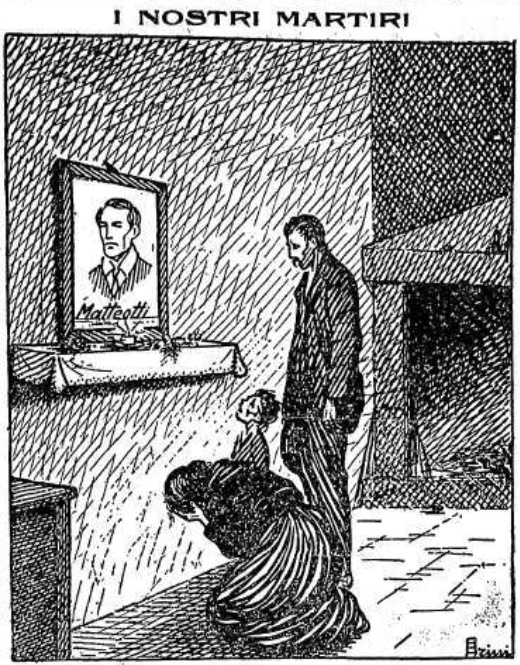
Drawing by Giuseppe Scalarini for Avanti! about the assassination of Matteotti

A key figure of the Italian left, Matteotti was an exponent of reformist socialism, distinguished by his pragmatic yet radical commitment to the fight for workers' rights, democracy, and social justice. His approach was based on concrete political and trade union action, the defence of the parliament and democracy, and a vision of socialism as a process aimed at improving the material and intellectual conditions of humanity through reforms. Deeply connected to the rural world of his hometown of Polesine, he was also critical of some of the PSI's positions, such as the PSI's wing in support of Italian entry in the Great War or when the reformists were expelled by the maximalist faction and he followed Turati to establish the PSU. Nicknamed Tempesta ("Storm") by his fellow socialists for his intransigent and combative character, Matteotti was known for his strong independent thinking, which led him to clash with other PSI members including Mussolini, as demonstrated by his opposition to the Italo-Turkish War and the Great War. He was also opposed to colonialism.

While a staunch supporter of reformism, Matteotti embraced a radical vision where reforms were not an end in themselves but a means to achieve the revolutionary goal of socialist society, which he envisioned as the gradual increase in the influence of the working class within the state. Unlike fascism and nationalism, Matteotti championed the importance of democratic institutions and the overcoming of capitalism with a collective economy, as well as the role of local institutions in his battle for democracy. He once said that "local administration is the forge of democracy". His battles were not limited to theory, and he took concrete steps in the fight for farmers' rights in the Polesine area and in the defence of legality and democratic principles in the parliament. Matteotti was a keen observer of the violent and liberticidal nature of fascism, and denounced its lies and violence, making warnings of the threat of fascist totalitarianism. His assassination marked a crucial moment in the transition to the fascist regime. It transformed him into a martyr of socialism, anti-fascism, and democracy, whose example of integrity, ethical consistency, and political commitment, as well as courage and sacrifice, inspirated many people who from all over Italy gathered in Fratta Polesine to participate in a June 1945 march organised to commemorate his death.

Since the fall of the fascist regime in Italy and the establishment of the Italian Republic, numerous busts, gardens, gravestones, monuments, murals, plaques, squares, streets, and stones were established in his honour, including the Monument to Giacomo Matteotti along the Lungotevere Arnaldo da Brescia in Rome, where his kidnapping and murder took place; in July 2025, the monument was vandalised, resulting in condemnation across the political spectrum. Matteotti and his murder were the subject of several films and television series. In Florestano Vancini's film The Assassination of Matteotti (1973), Matteotti was played by Franco Nero. In the historical drama television mini-series Mussolini: Son of the Century (2024–2025) directed by Joe Wright and based on the 2018 novel M. Son of the Century by Scurati that won the 2019 Strega Prize, Matteotti was played by Gaetano Bruno. In May 2024, Italian Prime Minister Giorgia Meloni said in the 100 year anniversary of his death, without mentioning Mussolini, that Matteotti was "a free man killed by fascist squads for his ideas". In the early 21st century, the assassination of Jamal Khashoggi and the death of Alexei Navalny were compared to that of Matteotti.

=== Martyr and myth ===
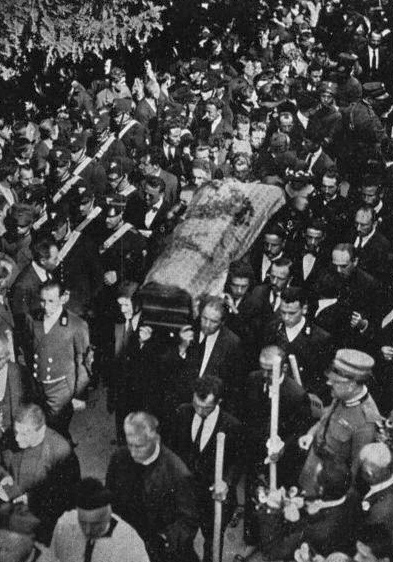
Matteotti's funeral on 21 August 1924

The brutality with which the Matteotti murder was carried out meant that from the beginning anti-fascist public opinion identified Matteotti as one of its martyrs. A strong contribution to the mythologisation of Matteotti was made by the excerpt of the confession attributed to Volpi, one of the material executors of the assassination, published in the newspaper of the PCd'I on 15 June 1924. In his confession, Volpi was quoted as saying that "Matteotti's demeanor was absolutely defiant as we stabbed him; I would say heroic. He continued to shout in our faces until the very end: 'Murderers, barbarians, cowards!' He never had a moment of weakness to plead for mercy. And as we continued our action, he repeated: 'Kill me, but you will never kill the idea that is in me.'" Volpi added that Matteotti could have saved his life if he had "humbled himself for a moment" and "asked us to save him" and recognise "the error of his idea", and further said: "Until the very end, as long as he still had a thread of voice, he shouted: 'My idea will not die! My children will boast of their father! The workers will bless my corpse!' He died shouting: 'Long live socialism!'"

Although Anna Kuliscioff observed that the words reported by l'Unità did not correspond to the linguistic style generally used by Matteotti, the declaration was quickly relaunched by other national newspapers. On 1 July, less than a month after the assassination, Piero Gobetti, who himself died of a heart attack at age 24 in February 1926 after suffering a fascist squad attack in 1925, dedicated an entire issue of La Rivoluzione Liberale to Matteotti's memory, highlighting his uncompromising anti-fascism and stating: "It takes a cold and calculating intelligence to discover the true adversary in Matteotti, the most intelligent and most irreducible opponent among the United Socialists, the youngest in years and spirit."

The Mussolini government opposed from the beginning the climate of commemoration that had been created by having the Blackshirts guarding the place where the crime had been committed in order to avoid any type of commemoration. In 1927, fascist politician and former PNF secretary Roberto Farinacci stated: "I had only one duty: to ensure that 10 June 1925 was the opposite of 10 June 1924. In fact, today we have succeeded in demonstrating that the nation is obsessed with the Aventine Party and considers all the Aventine supporters to be charlatans. Today we can say loud and clear that if Italy does not witness the evil speculation of that dead man—speculation that served to sell newspapers and insult our country abroad—it is thanks to fascism."

On 28 June 1924, Idea Nuova reported a letter of future Italian President Sandro Pertini; in the wake of emotion and indignation for the assassination, Pertini had requested to join the PSU. The Matteotti myth soon crossed national borders, so much so that in 1926 the Labour and Socialist International dedicated a fund to Matteotti's memory to help the workers' movement in dictatorial states, which remained active until the outbreak of the World War II. The Matteotti-Hof was inaugurated in 1927 as part of the public housing program of the city of Vienna. In Vienna, a social housing complex renamed Matteottihof was built between 1926 and 1927, while the Monument to Giacomo Matteotti was erected in the people's house in Brussels in 1927. Among other initiatives, the suffragette Sylvia Pankhurst founded in London on 1 May 1930 the Women's International Matteotti Committee.

During the Spanish Civil War in the 1930s, the Matteotti Battalion operated within the Justice and Freedom movement among the international brigades; the other was the Garibaldi Battalion. The Matteotti Battalion was formed in January 1937 within the Durruti Column. Among the many Italian figures who fought during the civil war were liberal socialists like Rosselli, republicans like Randolfo Pacciardi, and communists like Guido Picelli. During the Italian resistance movement to Nazi–fascism, the Italian Socialist Party of Proletarian Unity (PSIUP), the result of a merge in August 1943 of the PSI with the Movement for a United Proletariat (MUP) led by Lelio Basso and others, formed the Matteotti Brigades. Founded after the winter of 1943, the Matteotti Brigades were of socialist inspiration and part of the broader National Liberation Committee (CLN), initially coordinated by the Emilia-Romagna regional CLN and then by the Emilia Romagna Unified Military Command (CUMER). Among the other Italian partisan brigades in honour of Matteotti were the Matteotti Montagna Brigade and the Matteotti-Picelli Battalion.

Around the same time that his comrades were campaigning against Badoglio in August 1943, arguing that the Badoglio regime was fascism without Mussolini, the then PSI leader Pietro Nenni wrote in his diary upon his return to Rome in what was perhaps an overly optimistic account. Nenni wrote: "How distant fascism seems, as if it belonged to another era. On the walls there are only slogans full of disgust for Mussolini and with 'Long live Matteotti.' The symbols of fascism have already been chipped off the public buildings, and one might think that they never had the slightest influence on hearts." When fascists began to be purged from the government, critics of Badoglio wanted more, expecting the fascists who had murdered Matteotti, alongside the murderers of Amendola and the Rosselli brothers, to be tried and punished. Ultimately, the political purge in Badoglio's eyes seemed to consist solely of eliminating those fascists who posed a threat to public order and to himself.

138 days after the death of Mussolini on 28 April 1945, the Corriere della Sera debunked a rumour circulating in liberated Italy, first broken by the Chicago Sun, that one of Matteotti's sons had fired the bullet that killed Mussolini. Matteotti's early and intransigent opposition to fascism was used to promote the myth of the good Italian and absolve Italians of having supported fascism. In 1955, Matteotti was defined as a martyr in an official act of the Italian Republic, which gave Isabella Matteotti a pension as a "daughter of the Martyr". As president of the Chamber of Deputies from 1968 to 1976, Pertini published Matteotti's parliamentary speeches in 1970, and the first biography of Matteotti by Antonio Casanova came out in 1974, while the publication of the complete works, edited by historian Stefano Caretti, began in 1983. In subsequent decades, Matteotti's works were further re-published and analysed.

=== Communist views and reactions ===
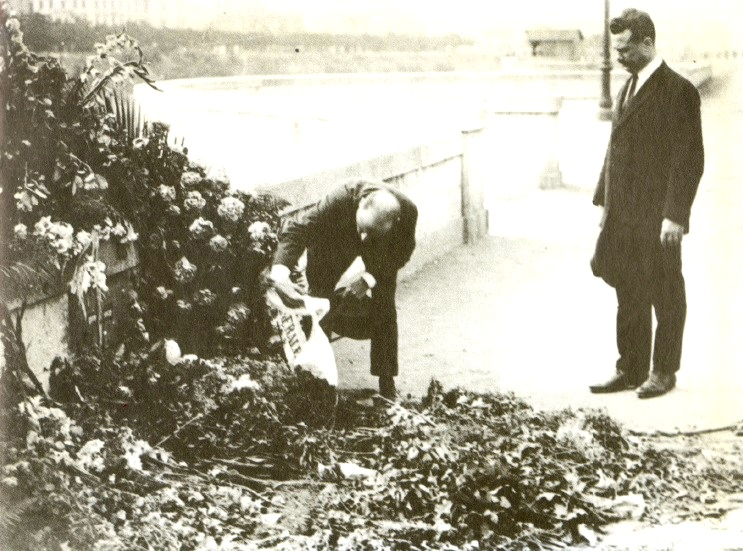
Bruno Buozzi paying homage to Matteotti on behalf of the General Confederation of Labour at the site of his kidnapping

In a 28 August 1924 article in Lo Stato Operaio, Gramsci criticised the figure of Matteotti, accusing him of being capable of mobilising the masses but not to carry out the revolution for the constitution of a socialist state. Gramsci defined Matteotti as a "pilgrim of nothingness", a term that he borrowed from Karl Radek's speech on 20 June 1923 in Moscow before the Third Plenum of the Executive Committee of the Comintern. Radek had applied this definition to the German nationalist Albert Leo Schlageter, who was convicted by a French military tribunal and shot for resisting the occupation of the Ruhr. In regard to Matteotti, Gramsci meant with this expression "the unfortunate fighter, but tenacious to the point of self-sacrifice, of an idea which cannot lead its believers and militants to anything other than a useless vicious circle of struggles, agitations, sacrifices without results and without a way out".

According to the historian of socialism Gaetano Arfé, in Gramsci's article and criticism there was an attempt at historicisation by virtue of which Gramsci proposed the Communist Party as the organisation that "gathers in the course of its struggle all that is most advanced in the national tradition ... . The commemorations written by Gramsci, Matteotti, and Serrati bear the mark of this tendency: reformism and maximalism are criticised and harshly, but also historicised, and what remains alive in them finds in communism its own new historical place." The thesis of social fascism, which was advanced by Joseph Stalin in the late 1920s, seemed to revive this internal dispute within the left but was criticised by Umberto Terracini, who instead recognised Matteotti's sacrifice and the propulsive value of his intransigence towards any type of collaboration with fascism.

In the wake of Gramsci's interpretation and into the 1970s, leading figures of the PCI accused Matteotti of having a defeatist attitude in the face of fascist violence, citing some passages of the speech he gave to the Chamber of Deputies on 10 March 1921, where he said: "The order of the Chamber of Labour is not to make any provocation. The order is: stay in your homes: do not respond to provocations. Even silence, even cowardice are sometimes heroic ... We have continued for months and months to say in our meetings that we must not accept provocations, that even cowardice is a duty, an act of heroism." In a 18 June 1921 article in L'Ordine Nuovo, Gramsci seemed to allude to this when he accused the socialists of having adopted a defeatist attitude in the face of fascist violence, arguing that "the peasants were told not to resist, to be cowards, to passively accept every oppression and every abuse". Matteotti's speech of 10 March concluded with a warning to the government that the continuation of fascist violence precluded further recommendations to socialist militants not to react. He stated: "But we have continued to preach for too many months, gentlemen of the Government, in vain; we do not feel like it, and we can no longer tell our people that discipline can spell their death; we can no longer order them to be killed one by one, to have their throats cut, for the sake of our discipline. We no longer feel like advising this, and in our assemblies we are now being told words we can no longer tolerate. You in the Government stand by, inert or complicit. We no longer deplore, we no longer ask for anything. Now you are informed of the situation; the Chamber is warned. This is what I wanted to tell you."

Pietro Secchia, an exponent of the most left wing of the PCI, in listing the sectors of Italian society that had supported Squadrismo, wrote that "one cannot forget that the leaders of the Socialist Party (Matteotti included) were decidedly against the armed struggle and preached resignation, non-resistance, the 'courage to be cowardly.'" Giorgio Amendola, who belonged to the PCI current closest to reformist socialism (Migliorismo), stated: "Matteotti went so far as to proclaim the heroism of silence and 'cowardice'. Three years later he had to pay, with the sacrifice of his life, for the 'cowardly' advice given to the workers when it was still possible to organise resistance and counterattack." Historian Massimo Salvadori thought the rebuke addressed by the Communist exponents to Matteotti was "truly outrageous" and said that they had misunderstood the true meaning of his appeal, "that is to say the invitation addressed to socialist militants and workers to hold back the temptation to respond to provocations that would have activated a spiral of ever new violence".

=== Commemorations ===
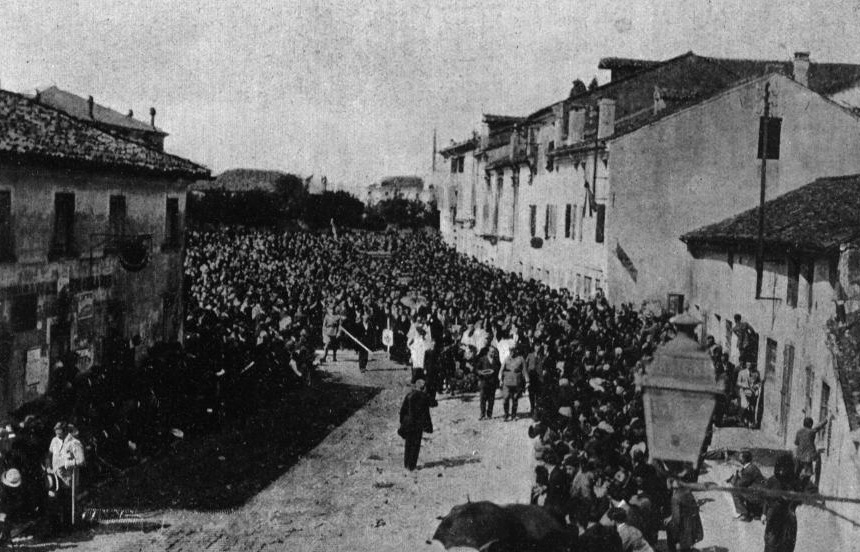

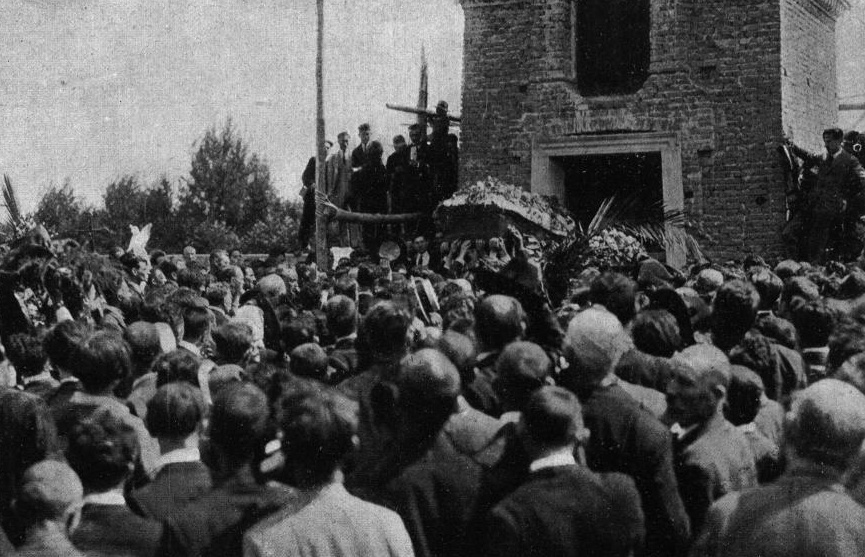
People in Fratta Polesine commemorating Matteotti

The memory of Matteotti is honoured by plaques and monuments scattered across the national territory; with bridges, schools, squares, and streets, Matteotti is the 20th-century politician most cited in Italian toponymy, with around 3,000 titles. In Fratta Polesine, there is the Giacomo Matteotti House-Museum, which was recognised in 2017 as a national monument by Italian President Sergio Mattarella. The building belongs to the Accademia dei Concordi by testamentary bequest of Matteotti's children, and was ceded for use to the municipality of Fratta Polesine. The house-museum is open to the public and offers a broad and detailed reconstruction of the life of Matteotti and his family. Under the control of a scientific committee, it publishes a series of studies titled Quaderni di Casa Matteotti. At the site of the kidnapping, near Lungotevere Arnaldo da Brescia in Rome, the Monument to Giacomo Matteotti by Iorio Vivarelli was erected in 1974, and the nearby bridge was renamed Ponte Giacomo Matteotti (formerly Ponte del Littorio). A monument to Matteotti was also erected in Riano at the site where the body was found.

The anniversary of Matteotti's assassination was routinely commemorated, including its 95th anniversary, and several decrees were issued in preparation of the centenary. At the suggestion of the Giacomo Matteotti Foundation, the Ministry of Culture established the National Committee for the Celebrations of the Centenary of the Death of Giacomo Matteotti (Ministerial Decree 20 April 2022, no. 172) and promoted the National Edition of the Matteotti Trials (Ministerial Decree 8 April 2022, no. 140). A Provincial Committee for the Celebrations of the Centenary of the Death of Giacomo Matteotti was established in the province of Rovigo in 2023. Also in 2023, the Italian Parliament definitively approved the law establishing the celebrations for the centenary of the death of Matteotti; among the research activities on the life, thought, and work of Matteotti, "educational and training initiatives will also be supported, in synergy with libraries, museums, and cultural institutions, through the direct involvement of scholastic institutions".

In 2024, the centenary of Matteotti's death was held in the Chamber of Deputies, with the presence of President Mattarella, all the highest officials of the state, and 300 students from all over Italy, as Alessandro Preziosi read Matteotti's last speech. The centenary was an occasion to rediscover his political thought, and not limit Matteotti to his assassination, as "a restless figure in and of the Italian left". In his honour was published L'oppositore. Matteotti contro il fascismo (The Opponent: Matteotti Against Fascism) by Grasso, Aventino. Storia di un'opposizione al regime (The Aventine: The Story of an Opposition to the Regime) by University of Milan professors Claudia Baldoli and Luigi Petrella, and Contro ogni violenza (Against All Violence), a volume edited by Davide Angelo Grippa, an associate professor of History, discussing the ideas and beliefs of Matteotti, including the speech he gave to the Chamber of Deputies on 31 January 1921 where he analysed political violence. Antonio Funiciello, a former chief of staff in the Draghi government, wrote L'infinita tempesta di Matteotti (The Endless Storm of Matteotti), arguing against the common view that Matteotti was alone and isolated. In the words of Caretti, "Few politicians have been able to inspire entire generations and arouse such profound and lasting echoes, even abroad, as Matteotti, but few have been at the same time glorified and less known."

In April 2024, Scurati was to held a monologue, which was set to air for Liberation Day (25 April) on the Rai 3 talk show Chesarà... of Serena Bortone to mark the national day celebrating the country's liberation from fascism; in his monologue, Scurati referenced Matteotti and other massacres committed by Mussolini's regime, and criticised Italy's "post-fascist" leaders for not "repudiating their neo-fascist past". Scurati's monologue was cancelled due to "editorial reasons", later claiming a "higher-than-expected" fee according to RAI director Paolo Corsini, amid allegations that the decision was pushed by Prime Minister Meloni, as reported by La Stampa. This prompted widespread criticism from RAI journalists, press freedom groups, authors, and opposition politicians, amid accuses of right-wing cancel culture and censorship; it was seen by critics as Italy's democratic backsliding and reduced media freedom and part of the Meloni government's attempt to influence mass media in Italy by targeting with legal action journalists critical of the government and to wield power of Italy's public broadcaster, which was called "TeleMeloni". The monologue referencing Matteotti, which according to Scurati was the main reason for the cancellation, was ultimately read by Bortone on her show, and was also published in full by several Italian newspapers and websites. In addition to her show being cancelled, Bortone received a six-day suspension while the then RAI CEO Roberto Sergio said she "should have been fired".

On 27 May 2026, the Chamber of Deputies held an official ceremony to commemorate Matteotti 102 years after his death. During the event, a permanent commemorative plaque was unveiled on seat number 14, the spot from which Matteotti delivered his final speech on 30 May 1924, denouncing fascist electoral fraud and violence. The Chamber of Deputies officially decreed that the seat would be permanently retired and left vacant as a lasting symbol of the defence of democracy and freedom of speech. The ceremony also sparked political debate due to the notable absence of several members from the ruling centre-right coalition majority. Lorenzo Fontana, the president of the Chamber of Deputies, said that Matteotti's words "always resonate in defence of freedom".

=== In popular culture ===
Matteotti is referenced in popular culture through awards, cinema, songs, sport, stamps, television, and theatre. The Giacomo Matteotti Prize was established in 2005 by the Presidency of the Council of Ministers; it is "awarded to works that illustrate the ideals of brotherhood between peoples, of freedom, and social justice that inspired the life of Giacomo Matteotti". The award is divided into three sections: "essays", "literary and theatrical works", and "degree theses". In 1945, the Matteotti Trophy was established alongside a men's road cycling race, which reached its 77th edition in 2025. In 1955, a commemorative Italian stamp (70th anniversary of his birth) of ₤25 in red was issued. In 2012, a commemorative stamp was issued by San Marino with a value of €2.64.

Many songs honoured Matteotti. "Povero Matteotti" is a protest song, performed to the tune of "Povero Cavallotti" (circa 1898). "L'assassinio di Giacomo Matteotti" is a counter-information song, performed to the tune of "La Leggenda del Piave" (circa 1918), including all the names of the people involved in the kidnapping and murder of Matteotti. The 33 rpm anthology Cantacronache 4 (1971) by the group Cantacronache included "Canta di Matteotti", with an anonymous author to the tune of "Il Maschio di Volterra" (circa 1900). Alessio Lega also honoured Matteotti throughs songs, referencing the verse "You kill the man, but not the idea" (Voi uccidete l'uomo, ma non l'idea) of a famous popular song, which made Matteotti an anti-fascist hero and martyr. To commemorate the centenary of Matteotti's death, Lega held a concert and spectacle in his honour titled "But Not the Idea. Matteotti's Life: Twenty Years of Resistance, a Hundred Years of Anti-Fascism" (Ma non l'idea: la vita di Matteotti. Vent'anni di resistenza, cento di antifascismo).

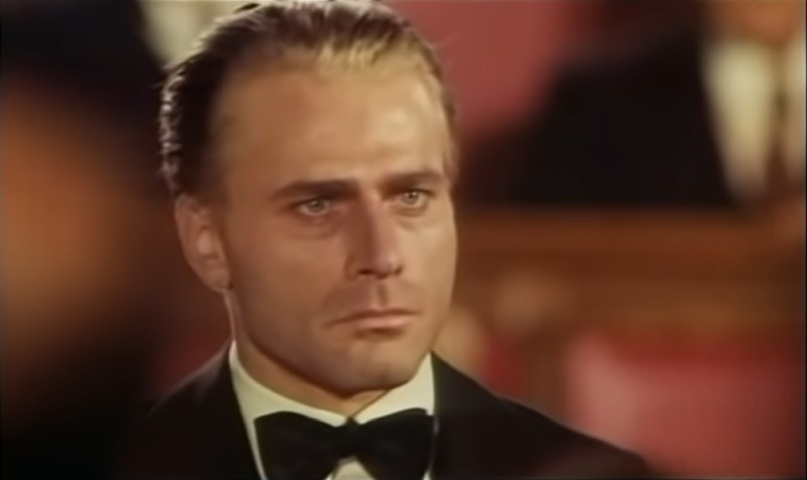
Franco Nero as Matteotti in The Assassination of Matteotti (1973)

Several documentaries and movies about Matteotti's life and his murder were made. In 1956, a 11-minute documentary about the Matteotti murder was directed by Nelo Risi. This was followed by the 1973 film and the 2025 television series, the former directed by Florestano Vancini and starring Franco Nero (as Matteotti) and Vittorio De Sica (as Del Giudice). In the latter, Bruno said about his play of Matteotti that he was too alone to be saved. In theatre, Maricla Boggio wrote Matteotti, l'ultimo discorso (Matteotti: The Last Speech), which was performed in the Council Chamber of the Campidoglio in Rome on 26 November 2004, and the theatrical text was published by the theatrical magazine Ridotto; it won Boggio the 2005 Matteotti Prize.

In 2021, Carmen Sepede and Emanuele Gamba wrote and directed Il mio nome è Tempesta. Il delitto Matteotti (My Name Is Storm: The Matteotti Murder), which won the 2022 Matteotti Prize from the Presidency of the Council of Ministers. For the same work, Sepede won the 2024 Flaiano International Prize. In 2024, Giuseppe Vitale wrote and directed Un uomo solo, solo un uomo (A Man Alone: Just a Man), which debuted at the Teatro Ghione in Rome on 10 June, the centenary of Matteotti's murder. It was sponsored by the Lazio region and the municipality of Rome, and was based on the book Solo (2021) by Riccardo Nencini. Also in 2024, there was a dramatic art spectacle of Matteotti's 31 January 1921 and 30 May 1924 parliamentary speeches directed and performed by Gianpiero Borgia and Elena Cotugno.

== Works ==
=== Essays ===
- La recidiva. Saggio di revisione critica con dati statistici (in Italian). Milan: Fratelli Bocca. 1910. SBN PAL0279701.
- Un anno di dominazione fascista (PDF) (in Italian). Rome: Tipografia italiana. 1923. SBN LO10494866.
  - The Fascisti Exposed: A Year of Fascist Domination. Translated by Dickes, E. W. London: Independent Labour Party Publication Department. 1924. OCLC 5305081.
  - Une année de domination fasciste (in French). Brussels: Maison nationale d'edition. 1924.
  - Fascismus in Italien. Grundlagen – Aufstieg – Niedergang (in German). Translated by Kaminski, Hanns-Erich. Berlin: Verlag für Sozialwissenschaft. 1925.
  - The Fascisti Exposed: A Year of Fascist Domination. Translated by Dickes, E. W. New York: Howard Fertig. 1969 [1924]. OCLC 47749.
  - Un anno di dominazione fascista (in Italian). With an essay by Umberto Gentiloni, introduction by Walter Veltroni. Milan: Rizzoli. 2019 [1923]. ISBN 978-88-586-9650-7. SBN RAV2092490.
  - Caretti, Simone, ed. (2020). Un anno e mezzo di dominazione fascista (in Italian). Pisa University Press. ISBN 978-88-333-9267-7.
- Il fascismo della prima ora. Pagine estratte dal "Popolo d'Italia" (in Italian). Roe: Tipografica italiana. 1924. SBN LO10491316.

=== Collections ===
- Reliquie (in Italian). Milan: Corbaccio. 1924. SBN RAV0187442.
- Contro il fascismo (in Italian). Milan; Rome: Avanti!. 1954. SBN MOD0311608.
  - Contro il fascismo (in Italian). With preface by Sergio Luzzatto. Milano: Garzanti. 2019 [1954]. SBN RAV2091584.
- Discorsi parlamentari (in Italian). With preface by Sandro Pertini. Rome: Stabilimenti tipografici Carlo Colombo. 1970. In three volumes. SBN PUV0135055.
- Scritti e discorsi (in Italian). Milan: Aldo Garzanti. 1974. SBN LIA0023787
- Scritti e discorsi (in Italian). Venezia: Marsilio. 1981. SBN RAV0122210.
- Caretti, Stefano, ed. (1983). Scritti sul fascismo (in Italian). Pisa: Nistri-Lischi. SBN CSA0066314.
- Giacomo Matteotti 1885-1985. Riformismo e antifascismo. Scritti e discorsi, testimonianze, contributi (in Italian). Rome: Ediesse. 1985. SBN UBO1625131.
- Caretti, Stefano, ed. (1986). Lettere a Velia (in Italian). Pisa: Nistri-Lischi. SBN CFI0036817
- Caretti, Stefano, ed. (1990). Sulla scuola (in Italian). Pisa: Nistri-Lischi. SBN CFI0195895.
- Caretti, Stefano, ed. (1992). Sul riformismo (in Italian). Pisa: Nistri-Lischi. SBN LO10099312.
- Caretti, Stefano, ed. (2003). Scritti giuridici (in Italian). Pisa: Nistri-Lischi. In two volumes. SBN RML0129964.
- Caretti, Stefano, ed. (2006). La questione tributaria (in Italian). Manduria: P. Lacaita. SBN CFI0658959
- Caretti, Stefano, ed. (2009). Scritti economici e finanziari (in Italian). Pisa: PLUS. In two volumes. SBN CFI0736425.
- Caretti, Stefano, ed. (2011). L'avvento del fascismo (in Italian). With premise by Aurelio Roncaglia. Pisa: PLUS. SBN CFI0772105.
- Caretti, Stefano, ed. (2012). Epistolario, 1904-1924 (in Italian). Pisa: Pisa University Press. ISBN 978-88-849-2850-4. SBN CFI0791869.
- Caretti, Stefano, ed. (2013). Socialismo e guerra (in Italian). With premise by Ennio Di Nolfo. Pisa: Pisa University Press. SBN CFI0814411.
- Caretti, Stefano, ed. (2014). Scritti e discorsi vari (in Italian). With premise by Gianpasquale Santomassimo. Pisa: Pisa University Press. SBN RAV2006276.
- La lotta semplice (in Italian). Rome: Edizioni di Comunità. 2019. SBN PAR1262151.
- Grasso, Mirko, ed. (2020). Il fascismo tra demagogia e consenso. Scritti 1922-1924 (in Italian). Rome: Donzelli. SBN UMC1011897.
- Polito, Pietro, ed. (2022). Questo è il fascismo (in Italian). Rome: e/o. SBN LO11859856.
- Grippa, Davide, ed. (2024). Contro ogni forma di violenza (in Italian). Turin: Einaudi. ISBN 978-88-584-4565-5. OCLC 1435778219.

== See also ==
- Centrist Marxism
- Olof Palme
- Sewer socialism
- Socialism in Italy

== Bibliography ==
=== Articles ===
- "10 giugno 1924 – 10 giugno 2024: 100° anniversario del delitto di Giacomo Matteotti" (in Italian). Luigi Einaudi Foundation. 31 May 2024.
- "1924-2024 | Due libri per parlare di Matteotti: 'L'oppositore. Matteotti contro il fascismo' di M. Grasso e 'Contro ogni forma di violenza' di G. Matteotti, a cura di D. Grippa | 6 giugno 2024, ore 16.30" (in Italian). Luigi Einaudi Foundation. 6 June 2024.
- "10 giugno 2025, 101 anni dopo: la ferita aperta dell'Italia democratica si chiama Matteotti". WordNews (in Italian). 10 June 2025.
- "2. Chi era Giacomo Matteotti". Mostre Virtuali (in Italian). 2024. Archived from the original on 16 March 2025.
- "4. Matteotti nei media". Mostre Virtuali (in Italian). 2024. Archived from the original on 29 April 2025.
- "A cento anni dalla morte di Giacomo Matteotti (1885-1924)" (in Italian). Provincial Library of Rovigo. 2024.
- Aghemo, Alberto (25 November 2024). "Giacomo Matteotti 'idealista-pratico'. Teoria e prassi del socialismo riformista". Diacritica (in Italian).
- "Aventino". La Repubblica (in Italian). 1 April 2011.
- Barichello, Irene (14 April 2024). "Il futuro martire Piero Gobetti al martire Giacomo Matteotti". Patria Indipendente (in Italian).
- Bermani, Cesare (2024). "La morte e il mito di Giacomo Matteotti nei canti popolari". Luoghi della storia nel Novarese e nel Verbano Cusio Ossola (in Italian). No. 2.
- Bianco, Gino (February 2013). "Matteotti a Londra". Una Città (in Italian). No. 200. Archived from the original on 22 December 2015.
- Canali, Mauro (10 June 2024). "Il delitto Matteotti". Atlante Magazine Treccani (in Italian).
- Cangini, Andrea (20 May 2022). "Matteotti fu un grand'uomo e un grande italiano. Ecco perché abbiamo votato la legge che dispone le dovute celebrazioni per il centenario della sua morte, nel 2024". HuffPost Italia (in Italian).
- Cansella, Ilaria (2015). "Volontari antifascisti toscani nella guerra civile spagnola" (in Italian). Grosseto Historical Institute of the Resistance and the Contemporary Age.
- Caprino, Francesca (2024). "Matteotti allo schermo" (in Italian).
- Carbonara, Stefano (30 May 2024). "Giacomo Matteotti, martire della libertà, ucciso dai fascisti". Monopoli Tre Rose (in Italian).
- Cazzullo, Aldo (19 March 2022). "In Spagna nel nome di Matteotti – "Patrioti per un'altra patria"". Corriere della Sera (in Italian).
- Cazzullo, Aldo (27 March 2024). "17 agosto 1924, il delitto Matteotti: la prima pagina del Corriere. Aldo Cazzullo: l'azione criminale fascista, la tragicommedia, il via alla dittatura". Corriere della Sera (in Italian).
- "Cento anni fa il discorso di Matteotti che portò al rapimento e all'omicidio del deputato polesano". RaiNews (in Italian). 30 May 2024.
- "Cento anni senza Giacomo Matteotti. 10 giugno 1924 – 10 giugno 2024". Giustizia Insieme (in Italian). 10 June 2024.
- Cingolani, Gabriele (9 June 2024). "L'oppositore. Matteotti contro il fascismo: un saggio di Mirko Grasso". La letteratura e noi (in Italian).
- Coletta, Stefano (10 June 2024). "Matteotti, cronache parlamentari e famigliari". Patria Indipendente (in Italian).
- "Commemorazione Delitto Giacomo Matteotti". Comune di Riano (in Italian). 7 June 2021. Archived from the original on 17 June 2021.
- Conti, Jacopo (1 February 2025). "Il Delitto Matteotti | Il film con Franco Nero? Impegno, politica e monito". The Hot Corn Italia (in Italian).
- Dei Nobili, Sabrina (30 May 2024). "A Carmen Sepede il 'Flaiano Teatro'". Il Centro.
- Dell'Erba, Nunzio (28 May 2004). "Matteotti: azione politica e pensiero giuridico". Patria Indipendente. Vol. LIII, no. 4–5. pp. 21–23.
- D'Orsi, Fabio (3 June 2024). "Recensione a: M. Grasso, L'oppositore. Matteotti contro il fascismo". Il Pensiero Storico.
- "Episodio 8 – Giacomo Matteotti e i comunisti". Lettera ai Compagni (in Italian). 2 September 2025.
- Fanelli, Matteo (5 June 2024). "Giacomo Matteotti, martire della democrazia" (in Italian). Central Cultural of Milan.
- Ferrari, Chiara (30 September 2013). "Cantacronache 1958-1962. Politica e protesta in musica". Storicamente (in Italian). 9. doi:10.12977/stor495. ISSN 2282-6033. Archived from the original on 19 September 2025.
- Fierro, Licia (2 March 2024). "Giacomo Matteotti: il suo e il nostro tempo". Giustizia Insieme (in Italian).
- Filippeschi, Marco (1 April 2025). "Giacomo Matteotti, socialista e riformista radicale, e il governo locale: finanza pubblica a difesa dei più deboli e democrazia dal basso". Governare il territorio (in Italian).
- Fornaro, Federico (22 September 2024). "L'attualità di Giacomo Matteotti". CIDI Torino (in Italian).
- Funiciello, Antonio (18 April 2024). "Lo spirito antifascista di Matteotti resiste, meno il suo socialismo riformista". Linkiesta (in Italian).
- Gentiloni, Umberto (30 May 2024). "Così nacque l'antifascismo". La Repubblica (in Italian).
- "Giacomo Matteotti" (in Italian). ANPI. 2023.
- "Giacomo Matteotti". Comune di Roma (in Italian). 2024.
- "Giacomo Matteotti" (PDF) (in Italian). Marche Gramsci Institute. June 2024.
- "Giacomo Matteotti 100" (in Italian). Giangiacomo Feltrinelli Foundation. 31 May 2024.
- "Giacomo Matteotti a Ferrara". Ferrara Arte e Cultura (in Italian). June–July 2014. Archived from the original on 23 March 2016.
- "Giacomo Matteotti e il riformismo intransigente". Terzo Millennio (in Italian). 10 June 2022.
- "Giacomo Matteotti: la mostra nel centenario". Vaccari news (in Italian). 8 April 2024.
- "Giacomo Matteotti: la tempra morale di un uomo solo contro tutti L'ottimismo della volontà e il pessimismo della ragione". Lo Specchio Magazine (in Italian). 1 August 2024.
- "Giacomo Matteotti nato a Fratta Polesine (Rovigo) nel 1885, ucciso da sicari fascisti a Roma il 10 giugno del 1924" (PDF). Luigi Micheletto Foundation. 10 June 2025.
- "Giacomo Matteotti: un anno di dominazione fascista Introduzione di Walter Veltroni". L'Eco del popolo (in Italian).
- "Giacomo • Teatro Franco Parenti • Milano". Teatro Franco Parenti (in Italian). 9 April 2024.
- Giuffrida, Angela (21 April 2024). "Italian author accuses state broadcaster of censorship of antifascist monologue". The Guardian.
- Gobetti, Piero (1 July 1924). "Matteotti". La Rivoluzione Liberale (in Italian). No. 27. Turin.
- Gotor, Miguel (9 June 2024). "Perché ricordare Giacomo Matteotti, che difese la democrazia". La Repubblica (in Italian). Archived from the original on 13 June 2024.
- Gramsci, Antonio (28 August 1924). "Il destino di Matteotti". Lo Stato Operaio (in Italian).
- Guerzoni, Monica (30 May 2024). "Fini e l'omaggio di Meloni a Matteotti: 'Il capo della squadraccia fascista era un fiorentino'" (in Italian).
- "Hanns-Erich Kaminski: Faschismus in Italien". Untergrund-Blättle (in German). 6 January 2020.
- Hughes-Hallett, Lucy (8 November 2013). "My hero: Giacomo Matteotti by Lucy Hughes-Hallett". The Guardian.
- "Il cantastorie Alessio Lega ricorda Giacomo Matteotti". Estense.com (in Italian). 17 January 2025.
- "Il discorso di Antonio Scurati censurato dalla Rai". MicroMega (in Italian). 22 April 2024.
- "Il discorso di Giacomo Matteotti alla Camera dei Deputati: 'Il voto va annullato'". L'Unità (in Italian). 30 May 2024.
- "Il discorso di Giacomo Matteotti al Parlamento". Libreriamo (in Italian). 3 June 2024.
- "Italy: Conversation Renewed". Time. 18 June 1956.
- King, Amy (2 October 2023). "A Martyr for the Resistance and the New Republic: The Uses of Giacomo Matteotti's Memory, 1943 to 1947". Italian Studies. 78 (4): 451–466. doi:10.1080/00751634.2023.2245614. hdl:1983/f35cbd96-1e53-43dd-b3ff-9102d3e9a364. ISSN 0075-1634.
- "La Brigata partigiana 'Matteotti Montagna'" (in Italian). Salaborsa Library. 19 August 2021.
- "'La lotta per la giustizia e la legalità di Giacomo Matteotti'" (in Italian). ANPI. 10 June 2020.
- "Le Brigate Matteotti". Socialismo Italiano 1892 (in Italian). 22 April 2021.
- "Le formazioni partigiane | Matteotti" (in Italian). ANPI. 2 April 2019.
- "L'eroica resistenza di Matteotti ai colpi dei suoi assassini". Il Mondo (in Italian). Rome. 17 June 1924. p. 9.
- "L'esperienza di Giacomo Matteotti cento anni dopo... 'La necessità di dimostrare che restavano quelli che non si arrendono'" (in Italian). CIDI Torino. 10 June 2024.
- "Liceo Celio, una storia lunga 150 anni". Il Resto del Carlino (in Italian). 21 December 2009.
- "'Ma non l'idea': Alessio Lega canta i cent'anni dall'assassinio di Matteotti". CesenaToday (in Italian). 16 September 2024.
- "Mapping Media Freedom: Italy: Rai's editorial independence questioned after censorship allegations". Mapping Media Freedom. 20 April 2024. Archived from the original on 25 June 2024.
- "Matteotti, documenti storici mai visti". La Cronaca di Verona (in Italian). 9 April 2024.
- "Matteotti murder". Committee for the History and Memories of the Twentieth Century of the Council of Modena. 13 February 2024.
- "Matteotti: Premio Flaiano a Carmen Sepede" (in Italian). ANSA. 30 May 2024.
- "Matteotti's Speech". Danger. 2024.
- "Matteotti Trophy, the Abruzzo cycling classic celebrates its 77th edition". Tuttobiciweb. 14 September 2025.
- "Matteotti, una vita per il socialismo e la democrazia" (in Italian). Central Archives of the State. 30 May 2024.
- Michelucci, Riccardo (2024). "Giacomo Matteotti (Fratta Polesine, 1885 – Roma, 1924) the anti-fascist politician who denounced Mussolini's crimes". Gariwo Foundation.
- Michelucci, Riccardo (27 June 2024). "Giacomo Matteotti cronaca di una morte annunciata". Radici (in Italian).
- "M – Il Figlio Del Secolo: Una scena della serie con Giacomo Bruno". The Hot Corn Italia (in Italian). 23 January 2025.
- Mirabello, Maria Cristina, ed. (2020). "Battaglione Matteotti-Picelli" (in Italian). La Spezia Institute for the History of the Resistance and the Contemporary Age.
- Momigliano, Anna (26 April 2022). "Mussolini Speaks, and Tells Us How Democracy Dies". The Atlantic. Archived from the original on 1 August 2025.
- Morosi, Silvia; Rastelli, Paolo (10 June 2017). "Giacomo Matteotti, morte di un antifascista". Corriere della Sera (in Italian).
- "Mussolini, Matteotti e la verità dei fatti con cui Antonio Scurati ha mandato in tilt TeleMeloni". Italia Libera (in Italian). 22 April 2024.
- "N/A". Ridotto (in Italian). No. 12. 5 April 2005 – via Drammaturgia.
- "N/A". Ridotto (in Italian). No. 9/10. 25 January 2006 – via Drammaturgia.
- Pelosi, Luca (23 May 2024). "'Un uomo solo, solo un uomo' a Roma nel 2024: date e biglietti (10 Giugno 2024 - 11 Giugno 2024)" (in Italian).
- Persili, Andrea (14 March 2024). "Matteotti europeista. Intervista a prof. Mirko Grasso: lezione ancora valida". BeeMagazine (in Italian).
- Picano, Angela (30 July 2018). "Delitto Matteotti e secessione dell'Aventino – Accadde oggi". Studia Rapido (in Italian).
- Piro, Rosa (14 July 2022). "Ritirarsi sull'Aventino". Atlante Magazine Treccani (in Italian).
- "Plaque for slain Mussolini critic Matteotti vandalized". ANSA. 21 July 2025.
- "Politica. Berlusconi allo Spectator: 'Saddam più feroce di Mussolini, il Duce non uccise nessuno'". Rai News 24 (in Italian). 11 September 2003. Archived from the original on 4 February 2015.
- "Premiata la scrittrice Boggio". La Sentinella del Canavese (in Italian). 16 November 2011.
- "Pubblicazione volume, G.Matteotti, Contro ogni forma di violenza, Einaudi, 2024, a cura di Davide Grippa" (in Italian). University of Naples "L'Orientale". 20 May 2024.
- "Quando i fascisti di Cefalù tolsero il cappello a Giacomo Matteotti". Castelbuono Live (in Italian). 6 November 2024.
- "Recensione. Mirko Grasso, L'oppositore, Carocci 2024" (in Italian). Montepulciano Municipal Library Piero Calamandrei. 18 March 2024.
- "Riano, una giornata per Giacomo Matteotti". La Repubblica (in Italian). 6 June 2024.
- Romanato, Gianpaolo (27 September 2017). "Biography". Giacomo Matteotti House Museum.
- Romanato, Gianpaolo (23 October 2024). "Il socialismo di Matteotti nacque tra i braccianti del Polesine". Avvenire (in Italian).
- Romanato, Gianpaolo (3 July 2025). "La modernità di Matteotti, 101 anni dopo il suo assassinio". Avvenire (in Italian).
- Romeo, Ilaria (10 June 2021). "10 giugno 1924. Dieci cose da sapere su Giacomo Matteotti, la minaccia fascista e il suo omicidio". Collettiva (in Italian).
- Romeo, Ilaria (16 August 2021). "Giacomo Matteotti: un uomo, un corpo, una Tempesta". Collettiva (in Italian).
- Russo, Sandro (6 April 2022). "'M. Il figlio del secolo'. La Storia, il Teatro e la Vita". Ponza Racconta (in Italian).
- Sacchelli, Orlando (5 June 2014). "L'attualità del pensiero di Giacomo Matteotti". Il Giornale (in Italian).
- Saccò, Pietro (2014). Sabatini, Angelo Guido (ed.). "Cronologia di Giacomo Matteotti". Tempo presente. Giacomo Matteotti a novant'anni dalla morte 1924-2014 (in Italian). No. 400–402.
- Santoro, Gabriele (10 June 2024). "Matteotti. Vita e morte di un padre della democrazia". Il Tascabile (in Italian).
- Sardi, Luigi (21 August 2024). "Giacomo Matteotti: 100 anni fa il delitto di regime che svelò il vero volto del fascismo/8". L'Adige (in Italian).
- Scarselli, Giuliano (23 March 2024). "La magistratura al tempo di Giacomo Matteotti di Giuliano Scarselli". Giustizia Insieme (in Italian).
- Scurati, Antonio (6 June 2024). "Antonio Scurati: 'Perché Matteotti è stato ucciso tante volte'". La Repubblica (in Italian).
- "Scurati and the monologue 'cancelled' by Rai: the presenter Serena Bortone read it". L'Unione Sarda English. 20 April 2024.
- Simoncelli, Maria Luisa (10 September 2024). "'L'errore catastrofico' della secessione dell'Aventino dopo il delitto Matteotti". Il Corriere Apuano (in Italian).
- Sirotti, Annamaria (25 October 2024). "Matteotti, l'Ambasciata d'Italia ricorda 'un italiano diverso'" (in Italian). San Marino Rtv.
- Soverina, Francesco (16 August 2024). "Giacomo Matteotti, un 'riformista rivoluzionario'". Patria Indipendente (in Italian).
- "Spettacolo su Matteotti a Roma, messaggio di Mattarella" (in Italian). ANSA. 25 November 2024.
- Spini, Valdo (15 June 2017). "Giacomo Matteotti: 'un eroe tutto prosa'". Patria Indipendente (in Italian).
- Subiaco, Francesco (19 November 2024). "L'infinita tempesta di Matteotti". Dissipatio (in Italian).
- "Teatro, 'Il mio nome è Tempesta' vince Premio Matteotti" (in Italian). ANSA. 5 October 2022.
- Tosatti, Mario (25 January 2025). "Alessio Lega ricorda Matteotti. Voci e note di giustizia e libertà". Il Resto del Carlino (in Italian).
- "Trofeo Matteotti". Corriere dello Sport (in Italian). 3 May 1945. p. 2 – via Biblioteca dello Sport.
- "Un secolo dopo, l'ultimo discorso di Matteotti nel parlamento italiano". Naufraghi/e (in Italian). 31 May 2024.
- "Un uomo solo, solo un uomo". Teatro Ghione (in Italian). 2024. Archived from the original on 10 June 2024.
- Vazzana, Simone (30 May 2024). "L'ultimo discorso di Giacomo Matteotti alla Camera prima di essere ucciso dai fascisti letto da Preziosi". Virgilio.it (in Italian).
- Venturini, Fernando (1 January 2020). "Un anno e mezzo di dominazione fascista: sulle tracce di un 'relitto archivistico'". Tempo presente. No. 472–474, April–June 2020. pp. 15–26 – via ResearchGate.
- Zaghi, Valentino (22 November 2017). "The Murder and Trials". Giacomo Matteotti House Museum.
- Zambon, Sibilla (10 June 2019). "Giacomo Matteotti morte annunciata di un antifascista". itLendinara (in Italian).
- Zucchi, Camilla (June 2024). "Italy's Public Memory of its Main Anti-fascist Martyr: Giacomo Matteotti in the Public Space One Century After his Murder" (PDF). Passés Futurs. No. 15.

=== Books ===
- Amendola, Giovanni (1960). La democrazia italiana contro il fascismo. 1922-1924 (in Italian). Milan; Naples: Riccardo Ricciardi.
- Amendola, Giorgia (1975). Fascismo e movimento operaio (in Italian). Rome: Editori Riuniti.
- Andriola, Fabio (1990). Mussolini. Prassi politica e rivoluzione sociale (in Italian). Guidonia Montecelio: F.U.A.N.
- Arfé, Gaetano (1973) [1965]. Storia del socialismo italiano (1892-1926) (in Italian). Turin: Einaudi.
- Bizzi, Ives (1975). Da Matteotti a Villamarzana. 30 anni di lotte nel Polesine (1915–1945) (in Italian). Treviso: Giacobino.
- Borgognone, Giovanni (2012). Come nasce una dittatura. L'Italia del delitto Matteotti (in Italian). Bari: Laterza. ISBN 978-88-420-9833-1.
- Breda, Marzio; Caretti, Stefano (2024). Il nemico di Mussolini: Giacomo Matteotti, storia di un eroe dimenticato (in Italian). Solferino. ISBN 978-88-282-1423-6.
- Casanova, Antonio G. (1974). Matteotti. Una vita per il socialismo (in Italian). Milan: Bompiani.
- Canali, Mauro (1997). Il delitto Matteotti. Affarismo e politica nel primo governo Mussolini (in Italian). Bologna: Il Mulino. ISBN 88-15-05709-9.
- Canali, Mauro (2004). Il delitto Matteotti (in Italian). Bologna: Il Mulino. ISBN 88-15-09729-5.
- Canali, Mauro (2015). Il delitto Matteotti (in Italian). Bologna: Il Mulino. ISBN 978-88-15-25841-0.
- Canali, Mauro (2024). The Matteotti Murder and Mussolini: The Anatomy of a Fascist Crime. Italian and Italian American Studies. Springer Nature. doi:10.1007/978-3-031-41471-8. ISBN 978-3-031-41471-8.
- Canali, Mauro (2024). Il delitto Matteotti (in Italian). Bologna: Il Mulino. ISBN 978-88-15-38930-5.
- Canzoniere 1 della protesta (in Italian). Edizioni del Gallo. 1972 – via Internet Archive.
- Castelli, Franco; Jona, Emilio; Lovatto, Alberto (2005). Senti le rane che cantano: canzoni e vissuti popolari della risaia (in Italian). Rome: Donzelli. ISBN 978-88-7989-943-7.
- Cavalli, Libero; Strada, Carlo (1982). Nel nome di Matteotti: materiali per una storia delle Brigate Matteotti in Lombardia, 1943-45 (in Italian). F. Angeli.
- Cyaheled, Luigi (1924). Matteotti è vivente (in Italian). Naples: Casa Editrice Vedova Ceccoli & Figli.
- De Felice, Renzo (1966). Mussolini il fascista. La conquista del potere. 1921–1925 (in Italian). Vol. I. Turin: Einaudi.
- De Felice, Renzo (1995). Mussolini il fascista. La conquista del potere. 1921–1925 (in Italian). Vol. I. Turin: Einaudi.
- Degl'Innocenti, Maurizio (2011). "L'ascesa del mondo socialista". Le culture politiche in Italia dal Risorgimento alla costituzione repubblicana. Convegno del 150 dell'Unità d'Italia, Bologna 9 giugno 2011 (PDF) (in Italian). Bologna: Bup. pp. 59–71. ISBN 978-88-7395-663-1 – via Filippo Turati Historical Studies Foundation.
- De Grand, Alexander J. (1983). Breve storia del fascismo (in Italian). Rome; Bari: Laterza.
- De Grand, Alexander J. (2000). Italian Fascism: Its Origins & Development. University of Nebraska Press. ISBN 0-8032-6622-7.
- Fornaro, Federico (2024). Giacomo Matteotti. L'Italia migliore. Saggi (in Italian). Torino: Bollati Boringhieri. ISBN 978-88-339-4260-5.
- Franzinelli, Mimmo (2017). Il delitto Rosselli: Anatomia di un omicidio politico (in Italian). Feltrinelli Editore. ISBN 978-88-588-2832-8.
- Giacomo Matteotti, immagini e documenti (PDF) (in Italian). Giacomo Matteotti Foundation; Filippo Turati Historical Studies Foundation. January 2015. Archived (PDF) from the original on 25 October 2020.
- Gramsci, Antonio (1971). La costruzione del Partito comunista 1923-1926 (in Italian). Turin: Einaudi.
- Gramsci, Antonio (1978). Sul fascismo (in Italian). Rome: Editori Riuniti.
- Gunther, John (1940). Inside Europe. Harper & Brothers. pp. 239–240 – via Internet Archive.
- Holmes, Rachel (2020). Sylvia Pankhurst: Natural Born Rebel. London: Francis Boutle Publishers.
- Bagatin, Pier Luigi; Contegiacomo, Luigi, eds. (2021). Il Polesine di Matteotti. Le inchieste giornalistiche di Adolfo Rossi e Jessie White (PDF) (in Italian). Cierre Edizioni.
- Lussu, Emilio (1976). Marcia su Roma e dintorni (in Italian). Turin: Einaudi.
- Lyttelton, Adrian (1974). La conquista del potere. Il fascismo dal 1919 al 1929 (in Italian). Rome; Bari: Laterza.
- Lyttelton, Adrian (2003). The Seizure of Power: Fascism in Italy, 1919–1929. Routledge. ISBN 0-7146-5473-6.
- Matteotti, Gianmatteo (1985). Quei vent'anni. Dal fascismo all'Italia che cambia (in Italian). Milan: Rusconi.
- Modena, Claudio, ed. (2014). L'avvocato di Matteotti. Pasquale Galliano Magno (in Italian). Milan: Apogeo. ISBN 978-88-986-0805-8.
- Pollard, John (2006). "The papacy". In McLeod, Hugh (ed.). The Cambridge History of Christianity: World Christianities c.1914–c.2000. Vol. 9. Cambridge: Cambridge University Press. pp. 27–49. ISBN 978-0-521-81500-0.
- Pugliese, Stanislao G. (1999). Carlo Rosselli: Socialist Heretic and Antifascist Exile. Harvard University Press. ISBN 978-0-674-00053-7.
- Pugliese, Stanislao G. (2004). Fascism, Anti-Fascism, and the Resistance in Italy: 1919 to the Present. Rowman & Littlefield. ISBN 0-7425-3123-6.
- Romanato, Gianpaolo (2010). Un italiano diverso. Giacomo Matteotti (in Italian). Milan: Longanesi.
- Romanato, Gianpaolo (2024) [2010]. Un italiano diverso. Giacomo Matteotti. Saggi (in Italian). Florence; Milan: Giunti; Bompiani. ISBN 979-12-217-0404-4.
- Rossini, Carlo (1966). Il delitto Matteotti fra il Viminale e l'Aventino (in Italian). Bologna: Il Mulino.
- Sabbatucci, Giovanni (2012). 1924. Il delitto Matteotti (in Italian). Laterza. ISBN 978-88-581-0533-7.
- Sachar, Howard M. (2013). Farewell Espana: The World of the Sephardim Remembered. Knopf Doubleday Publishing Group. ISBN 978-0-8041-5053-8.
- Salvadori, Massimo L. (2023). L'antifascista. Giacomo Matteotti, l'uomo del coraggio, cent'anni dopo (1924-2024) (in Italian). Rome: Donzelli. ISBN 978-88-5522-533-5.
- Santomassimo, Gianpasquale (2014). "Premessa". In Caretti, Stefano (ed.). Scritti e discorsi vari (in Italian). Pisa: Pisa University Press.
- Savona, Antonio Virgilio; Straniero, Michele Luciano (1985). Canti della Resistenza italiana (in Italian). Milan: Rizzoli.
- Secchia, Pietro (1971). Le armi del fascismo (1921-1971) (in Italian). Milan: Feltrinelli.
- Secchia, Pietro (1973). Lotta antifascista e giovani generazioni (in Italian). Milan: La Pietra.
- Sidera, Alba (2020). Feixisme persistent: Radiografia de la Itàlia de Matteo Salvini (in Catalan). Edicions Saldonar. ISBN 978-84-17611-31-6 – via Google Books.
- Silvestri, Carlo (1947). Matteotti, Mussolini e il dramma italiano (in Italian). Rome: Ruffolo.
- Silvestri, Carlo (1981). Matteotti, Mussolini e il dramma italiano (in Italian). Milan: Cavallotti.
- Spriano, Paolo (1967). Storia del Partito comunista italiano. Da Bordiga a Gramsci (in Italian). Vol. I. Turin: Einaudi.
- Staglieno, Marcello (2003). Arnaldo e Benito. Due fratelli (in Italian). Milan: Mondadori. ISBN 88-04-51264-4.
- Tozzo, Enrico (2005). La giacca di Matteotti e il processo Pallavicini. Una rilettura critica del delitto (in Italian). Rome: Aracne. ISBN 88-548-0041-4.
- Treves, Claudio (1945). Filippo Turati (in Italian). Avanti!.
- Woller, Hans (2009) [1996]. Die Abrechnung mit dem Faschismus in Italien 1943 bis 1948 (in German). Walter de Gruyter. doi:10.1524/9783486594362. ISBN 978-3-486-59436-2. Archived from the original on 10 November 2025.
- Zaghi, Valentino (1989). L'eroica viltà. Socialismo e fascismo nelle campagne del Polesine 1919-1926 (in Italian). Milan: FrancoAngeli.
- Zaghi, Valentino (2001). Giacomo Matteotti (in Italian). Sommacampagna: Cierre. ISBN 88-8314-110-5.

=== Documents ===
- "100° anniversario della morte di Giacomo Matteotti (1885-1924)". Anniversari nazionali (in Italian). 2024.
- "Atti Parlamentari, Camera dei deputati del Regno d'Italia, resoconto stenografico, Assemblea, 31 gennaio 1921" (PDF) (in Italian). Chamber of Deputies. 31 January 1921.
- Berlinguer, Mario (22 August 1944). "Alto Commissariato per le sanzioni contro il fascismo. Alto Commissariato per la punizione dei delitti" (in Italian). Historical Archives of the Senate of the Italian Republic.
- "Brigate Matteotti". National Archival System.
- Caria, Maria Cristina (14 June 2024). "Matteotti e NOI. Commemorazione 100° anniversario della morte" (PDF) (in Italian). Regional Council of Sardinia.
- "Decreto del Presidente del Consiglio dei ministri 4 marzo 2005, n. 72". Gazzetta Ufficiale (in Italian). No. 99. 30 April 2005.
- "Decreto del Presidente della Repubblica 17 maggio 1955, n. 528". Gazzetta Ufficiale (in Italian). No. 150. 2 July 1955.
- Grasso, Pietro (10 June 2014). "Sul 90° anniversario della morte di Giacomo Matteotti" (in Italian). Senate of the Republic.
- "Legge 9 novembre 1955, n. 1069". Gazzetta Ufficiale (in Italian). No. 268. 21 November 1955. pp. 4027–4034.
- "Legge 10 luglio 2023, n. 92". Gazzetta Ufficiale (in Italian). No. 169. 21 July 2023.
- "Legge 20 dicembre 2017, n. 2013". Gazzetta Ufficiale (in Italian). No. 4. 20 January 2018.
- "Matteotti Giacomo" (in Italian). Riano: State Archives of Rome. 1924. The death certificate, available on the Portale Antenati, was drawn up (in Part II, Series C) of the registry of the municipality of Riano, where the body was found on 16 August 1924. A Rectification Sentence, dated 12 October 1925, corrected Matteotti's date of birth, which had been partially incorrectly reported in the death certificate.
- Statistica delle elezioni generali politiche per la XXV legislatura (16 novembre 1919) (in Italian). Rome: Stabilimento poligrafico per l'Amministrazione della guerra. 1920.
- Statistica delle elezioni generali politiche per la XXVI legislatura (15 maggio 1921) (in Italian). Rome: Industrie Grafiche. 1924.
- Statistica delle elezioni generali politiche per la XXVII legislatura (6 aprile 1924) (in Italian). Rome: Libreria dello Stato. 1924.
- "Tornata di mercoledì 4 giugno 1924" (PDF) (in Italian). Chamber of Deputies. 4 June 1924.

=== Encyclopaedias ===
- Canali, Mauro (2008). "Matteotti, Giacomo". Dizionario biografico degli italiani (in Italian). Vol. 72. Rome: Italian Encyclopedia Institute.
- "Matteotti, brigate". Enciclopedia Bresciana (in Italian). 4 March 2022.
- "Matteotti, Giacomo". Enciclopedia Italiana (in Italian). Vol. II (Appendix). Rome: Italian Encyclopedia Institute. 1949.
- "Matteotti Giacomo". Encyclopedia Britannica. 20 July 1998. Last updated 6 June 2024.
- "Matteotti, Giacomo". Dizionario di Storia (in Italian). Rome: Italian Encyclopedia Institute. 2010.
- "Matteòtti, Giacomo". Enciclopedia Treccani (in Italian). 28 July 2023.

=== Podcasts ===
- Botto, Giacomo (27 May 2024). "Dieci Giugno" (Podcast) (in Italian). Storielibere.fm.
- "Delitto Matteotti: l'inizio del regime" (Podcast) (in Italian). RaiPlaySound. 22 May 2024.
- "Calvino, le sue canzoni e i Cantacronache" (Podcast) (in Italian). Rai Radio 3; RaiPlay Sound. 22 October 2023.
- Augias, Corrado; Gentiloni, Umberto (22 May 2024). "L'ascesa del fascismo e il delitto Matteotti" (Podcast) (in Italian). RaiPlaySound.
- Pierattini, Sergio (11 June 2024). "10 giugno 1924. Morte di una democrazia" (Podcast) (in Italian). Rai Radio3; RaiPlaySound.
- "Scurati racconta il delitto Matteotti stagione 1 – Podcast". La Repubblica (Podcast) (in Italian). 7 June 2024.

=== Songs ===
- "Canta di Matteotti" (in Italian). Il Deposito. 2014. Archived from the original on 2 January 2014.
- "L'assassinio di Giacomo Matteotti" (in Italian). Il Deposito. 2021.
- "Matteotti (2004) di Alessio Lega" (in Italian). Il Deposito. 10 January 2004.
- "Povero Matteotti" (in Italian). Il Deposito. 2021.

=== Stamps ===
- "10 novembre 1955 – 70º anniversario della nascita di Giacomo Matteotti". iBolli.it (in Italian). 21 December 2023.
- "16 ottobre 2012 – Maestri di libertà". iBolli.it (in Italian). 21 December 2023.

=== Videos ===
- Boggio, Maricla (26 November 2004). Matteotti, l'ultimo discorso – via YouTube.
- Giacomo Matteotti ucciso dai fascisti il 10-06-1924, il ricordo dei nipoti di Giovanni Cosattini (in Italian). ELETTRITV. 16 June 2023 – via YouTube.
- Mastellarini, Gabriele; Acciavatti, Fabrizio (14 September 2025). Il 77° Trofeo Matteotti (in Italian). TGR Abruzzo.
- L'oppositore. Matteotti contro il fascismo di Mirko Grasso, Carocci editore 2024. Giacomo Matteotti Foundation. 21 March 2024 – via YouTube.
- Preziosi, Alessandro (30 May 2024). Alessandro Preziosi legge alla Camera l'ultimo discorso di Matteotti (in Italian). Vista Agenzia Televisiva Nazionale – via YouTube.
- Quartarella a Riano: Giovanni Volterra ricorda Cosattini amico di Matteotti – ANPI Flaminia Tiberina (in Italian). ELETTRITV. 16 June 2023 – via YouTube.
- Sabbatucci, Giovanni (13 December 2007). 1924. Il delitto Matteotti. Editori Laterza – via YouTube.
