= Unitary Socialist Party (Italy, 1922) =

Defunct Italian political party

Unitary Socialist Party Partito Socialista Unitario
- Abbreviation: PSU
- Leaders: Giacomo Matteotti; Filippo Turati; Carlo Rosselli; Giuseppe Saragat
- Founded: 4 October 1922
- Banned: 11 January 1925; 19 July 1930 (de facto dissolved)
- Split from: Italian Socialist Party
- Merged into: Italian Socialist Party
- Newspaper: La Giustizia
- Ideology: Democratic socialism Social democracy
- Political position: Centre-left
- International affiliation: Labour and Socialist International
- Colors: Red

The Unitary Socialist Party (Partito Socialista Unitario, PSU) was a democratic socialist political party in Italy active from 1922 to 1930. Its outlook was reformist and anti-fascist.

== History ==
The PSU was founded on 4 October 1922 by the reformist wing of the Italian Socialist Party (Partito Socialista Italiano, PSI). The new party was led by Giacomo Matteotti, Vittorio Emanuele Modigliani, Rinaldo Rigola, Claudio Treves, and Filippo Turati after they had been expelled at the PSI party congress in October.

A staunch opponent of Benito Mussolini and Italian fascism, Matteotti was assassinated by a fascist secret police squad on 10 June 1924, an event that provoked the Aventine Secession. Outlawed in November 1925, the PSU remained active as the clandestine Italian Workers' Socialist Party (Partito Socialista dei Lavoratori Italiani, PSLI). On 19 July 1930, the PSLI re-joined the PSI. Leading members and activists of the party included Anna Kuliscioff, Oddino Morgari, Sandro Pertini, Camillo Prampolini, Carlo Rosselli, Giuseppe Saragat, and Treves. The party was a member of the Labour and Socialist International between 1923 and 1930.

The same PSU name was adopted in 1949 after Saragat and others left the PSI. In 1969, a new PSU was formed following the split from the unified PSI and Saragat's Italian Democratic Socialist Party (Partito Socialista Italiano Democratico, PSDI) and was favourable to the continuation of the organic centre-left governing coalition. This group reverted to the PSDI name in 1971.

== Electoral results ==
Chamber of Deputies
Election year	Votes	%	Seats	+/−	Leader
1924	422,957 (3rd)	5.90	24 / 535	–	Giacomo Matteotti

== See also ==
- Unitary Socialist Party (Italy, 1949)
- Unified Socialist Party (Italy)
