= Claudio Treves =

Italian politician and journalist

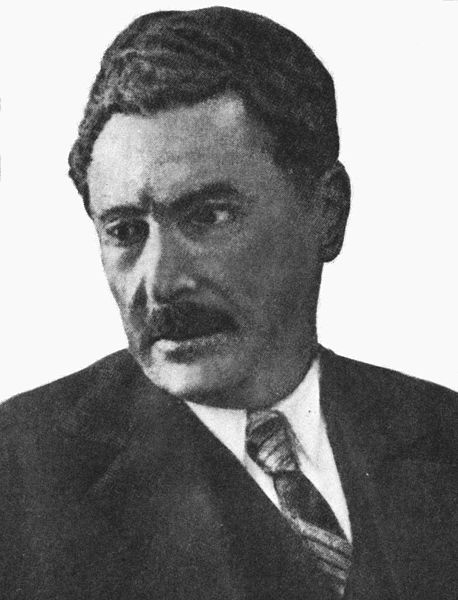

Member of Chamber of Deputies
- In office 30 November 1904 – 9 November 1926
- Constituency: Milan

Personal details
- Born: 24 March 1869 Turin, Kingdom of Italy
- Died: 11 June 1933 (aged 64) Paris, France
- Party: PSI (1892–1922); PSU (1922–1933)
- Occupation: Journalist, politician

Claudio Treves (24 March 1869 – 11 June 1933) was an Italian politician and journalist.

== Life ==
=== Youth ===
Claudio Treves was born in Turin into a well off assimilated Jewish family. As a student he participated in the Radical milieu of Turin and, in 1888, he joined first his university's student radical circle, then the local independent labor union, influenced by the Milanese socialist Filippo Turati. In 1892 he graduated in law and made his way into the militant socialist community.

=== PSI ===
Treves became a member of the managing committee of the Piedmontese regional federation of the Partito Socialista Italiano (PSI), and in 1894, prosecuted under the 'exceptional laws' on sedition, he spent two months in prison. For some years after he travelled abroad, spending two years to Berlin, then on to Paris, Switzerland, Netherlands, Belgium and Scandinavia. All the while Treves was sending reports from these countries to Avanti!, the Italian socialist paper. He contributed to several newspapers and periodicals, among which were Per l'idea, Grido del popolo (which he edited from 1896 to 1898), Critica Sociale, Lotta, Lotta di classe, Rassegna popolare del socialismo, Riscatto and, finally, Milan's Università popolare where he was on the editorial board until 1915.

=== From the PSI to the PSU ===
In 1899 he moved to Milan to become editor of the daily Il Tempo, which under his stewardship became a leading voice for greater democracy and the Italian Reformist Socialist movement. Working closely with Turati, in 1906 he was elected deputy from Milan. over the next decade, the PSI see-sawed between reformist and revolutionary factions. Seen as far too close to Giovanni Giolitti and the Liberals, Turati and the Reformists lost control of the party in 1904, regained it in 1908, only to lose it again in 1912. After the Milan conference of the PSI in 1910 he was named editor of Avanti!, a job in which he was succeeded in 1912 by Giovanni Bacci and later Benito Mussolini before the one time socialist's drift to the right. As a result of the division in the socialist movement between 'Maximalists' and Reformists, in 1922, with Turati, Giacomo Matteotti, and Treves founded the Unitary Socialist Party (PSU). He was named editor of the party's paper, La Giustizia, only to see it closed by state order of the new Fascist government in 1925.

=== Exile ===
In November 1926 Treves fled into exile, emigrating first to Switzerland and then to France, where he was one of the more frequent collaborators of the weekly journal of the PSLI (the underground successor to the now outlawed PSU), Rinascita socialista. In 1927 he was named editor of La Libertà, journal of the Concentrazione Antifascista Italiana, a coalition of non-communist Italian anti-fascist groups. In 1930 he supported the unification of the PSLI and the PSI. Always attentive to the evolution of European Socialism, he attended the British Labour Party conference of 1930, the international trade union conference in Madrid in June 1931 and the conference of the Socialist International in Vienna in July 1931.

He died on 11 June 1933, still in exile in Paris, and in 1948 his ashes were returned to Milan.

=== Family ===
Treves' son, Paolo Treves, later succeeded him as a militant of the PSI and editor of Avanti!, while his sister, Annetta Treves, was also active in Milanese politics. She is the mother of writer and activist Carlo Levi.

In the Florestano Vancini's film The Assassination of Matteotti (1973), Treves is played by Manlio Busoni.
