= 1924 Italian general election =

- 6 April 1924

All 535 seats in the Chamber of Deputies 268 seats needed for a majority
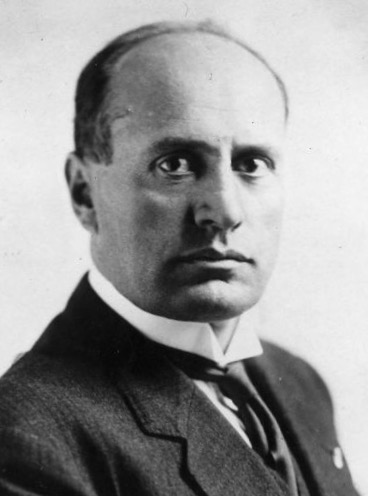

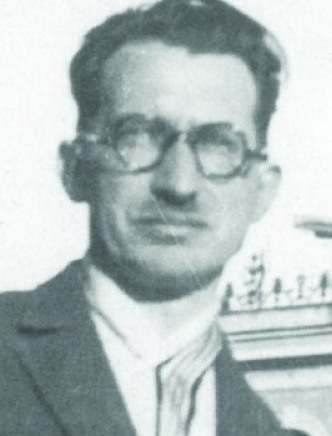

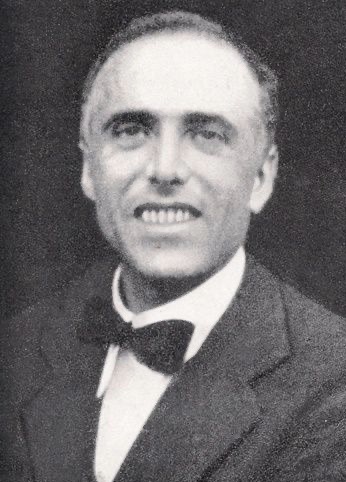

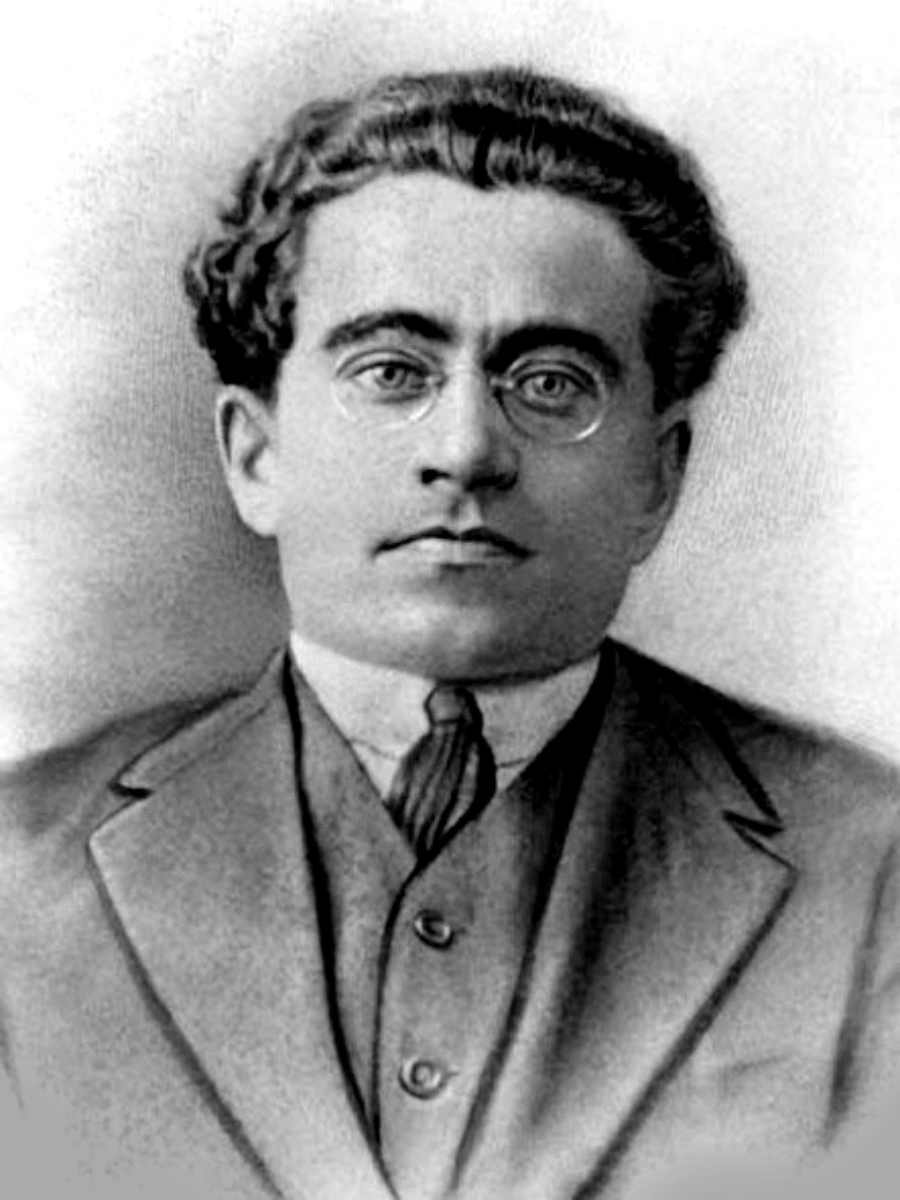

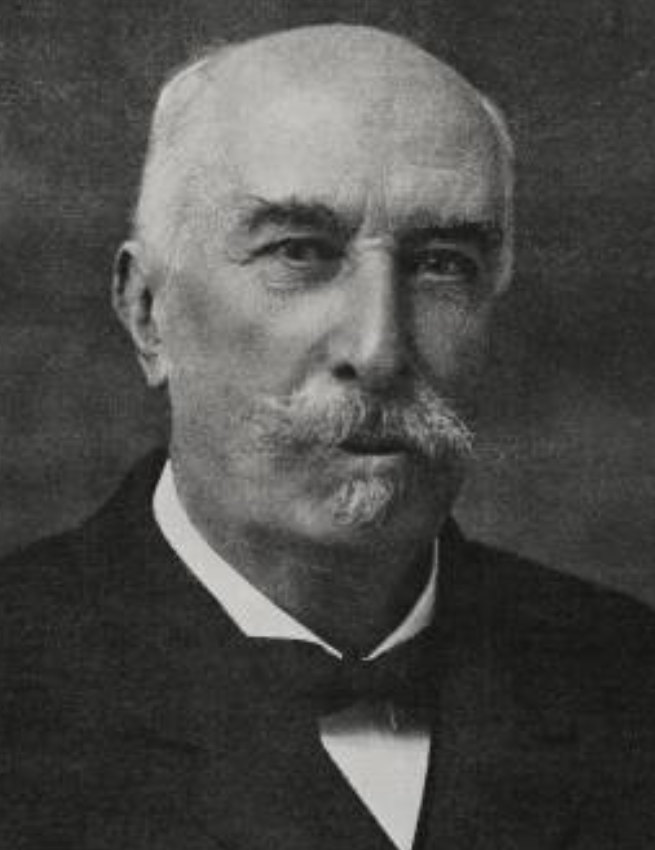
	Majority party	Minority party	Third party
Leader	Benito Mussolini	Alcide De Gasperi	Giacomo Matteotti
Party	National List	PPI	PSU
Seats won	374	39	24
Seat change	New	▼69	New
Popular vote	4,653,488	645,789	422,957
Percentage	64.94%	9.01%	5.90%
Swing	New	▼11.38 pp	New
	Fourth party	Fifth party	Sixth party
Leader	Tito Oro Nobili	Antonio Gramsci (Note: Although Gramsci had not yet been appointed secretary of the Communist Party at the time of the election, he could be considered the party’s leader-in-waiting.)	Giovanni Giolitti and others (Note: In 1924, the Liberals entered the election in a fragmented state; Giolitti was the leader of the list that scored the most votes.)
Party	PSI	PCdI	Liberals
Seats won	22	19	15
Seat change	▼101	▲4	▲86
Popular vote	360,694	268,191	233,521
Percentage	5.03%	3.74%	3.26%
Swing	▼19.66 pp	▼0.87 pp	▼3.86 pp
Prime Minister before election
Benito Mussolini
PNF
Elected Prime Minister
Benito Mussolini
PNF

General elections were held in Italy on 6 April 1924 to elect the members of the Chamber of Deputies. They were held two years after the March on Rome, in which Benito Mussolini's National Fascist Party rose to power, and under the controversial Acerbo Law, which stated that the party with the largest share of the votes would automatically receive two-thirds of the seats in Parliament as long as they received over 25% of the vote.

Mussolini's National List (an alliance of fascists and a few liberal political parties) used intimidation tactics against voters, resulting in a landslide victory and a subsequent two-thirds majority. This was the country's last multi-party election until the 1946 Italian general election.

== Background ==
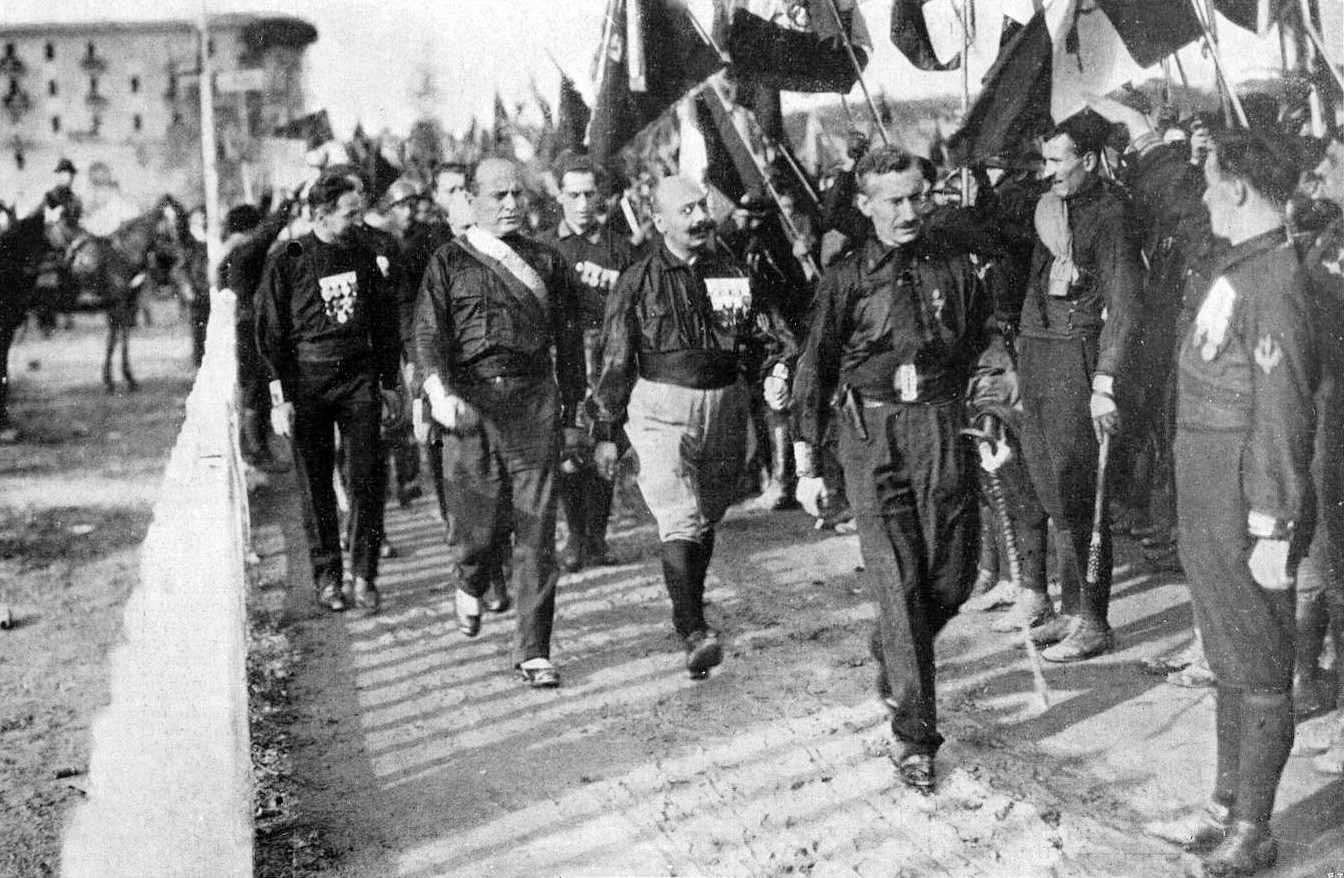
Benito Mussolini and the fascist Blackshirts during the March on Rome in October 1922

On 22 October 1922 Benito Mussolini, the leader of the National Fascist Party, attempted a coup d'état (titled by the Fascist propaganda as the March on Rome) in which around 30,000 Italian fascists took part. The quadrumvirs leading the Fascist party, General Emilio De Bono, Italo Balbo (one of the most famous ras), Michele Bianchi, and Cesare Maria de Vecchi, organized the march while Mussolini stayed behind for most of the march; Mussolini allowed pictures to be taken of him marching along with the Fascist marchers. Generals Gustavo Fara and Sante Ceccherini assisted to the preparations of the March of 18 October. Other organizers of the march included the Marquis Dino Perrone Compagni and Ulisse Igliori.

On 24 October 1922 Mussolini declared before 60,000 people at the Fascist Congress in Naples: "Our program is simple: we want to rule Italy." The Blackshirts occupied some strategic points of the country and began to move on the capital. On 26 October, former Prime Minister of Italy, Antonio Salandra, warned the incumbent Prime Minister Luigi Facta that Mussolini was demanding his resignation and that he was preparing to march on Rome. Facta did not believe Salandra and thought that Mussolini would govern quietly at his side. To meet the threat posed by the bands of Fascist troops now gathering outside Rome, Facta (who had resigned but continued to hold power) ordered a state of siege for Rome. Having had previous conversations with King Victor Emmanuel III about the repression of Fascist violence, he was sure the King would agree. Instead, the King refused to sign the military order. On 28 October, the King handed power to Mussolini, who was supported by the military, the business class, and political right.

While the march itself was composed of fewer than 30,000 men, the King feared a civil war as he did not consider the Facta's government strong enough, and Fascism was no longer seen as a threat to the establishment. Mussolini was asked to form his cabinet on 29 October while some 25,000 Blackshirts were parading in Rome. The March on Rome was not the conquest of power which Fascism later celebrated but rather the precipitating force behind a transfer of power within the framework of the constitution. This transition was made possible by the surrender of public authorities in the face of Fascist intimidation. Many business and financial leaders believed it would be possible to manipulate Mussolini, whose early speeches and policies emphasized free market and laissez-faire economics.

Back in October 1922, even though the coup failed in giving power directly to the Fascist party, it nonetheless resulted in a parallel agreement between Mussolini and the King that made Mussolini the head of the Italian government.

== Electoral system ==
This was the first and only multi-party general election held under the terms of the Acerbo Law. The Acerbo Law had been adopted by Parliament in November 1923 and stated that the party gaining the largest share of the votes—provided they had gained at least 25 percent of the votes—gained two-thirds of the seats in parliament. The remaining third was shared amongst the other parties through proportional representation.

=== Voting rights ===
Only men were eligible to vote in this election. NCOs and soldiers of military bodies (such as the Italian Army and Navy) were temporarily stripped of their right to vote.

== Main parties and leaders ==
Party	Ideology	Leader	Seats in 1921
Italian Socialist Party (PSI)	Socialism	Tito Oro Nobili	123
Italian People's Party (PPI)	Christian democracy	Alcide De Gasperi	108
Liberals	Liberalism	Several	101
National List (LN)	Fascism	Benito Mussolini	49
Social Democracy (DS)	Social liberalism	Giovanni Antonio Colonna	29
Communist Party of Italy (PCdI)	Communism	Antonio Gramsci	15
Italian Republican Party (PRI)	Republicanism	Eugenio Chiesa	6
Constitutional Opposition (OC)	Liberalism	Giovanni Amendola	Did not exist
Unitary Socialist Party (PSU)	Social democracy	Giacomo Matteotti	Did not exist

== Results ==
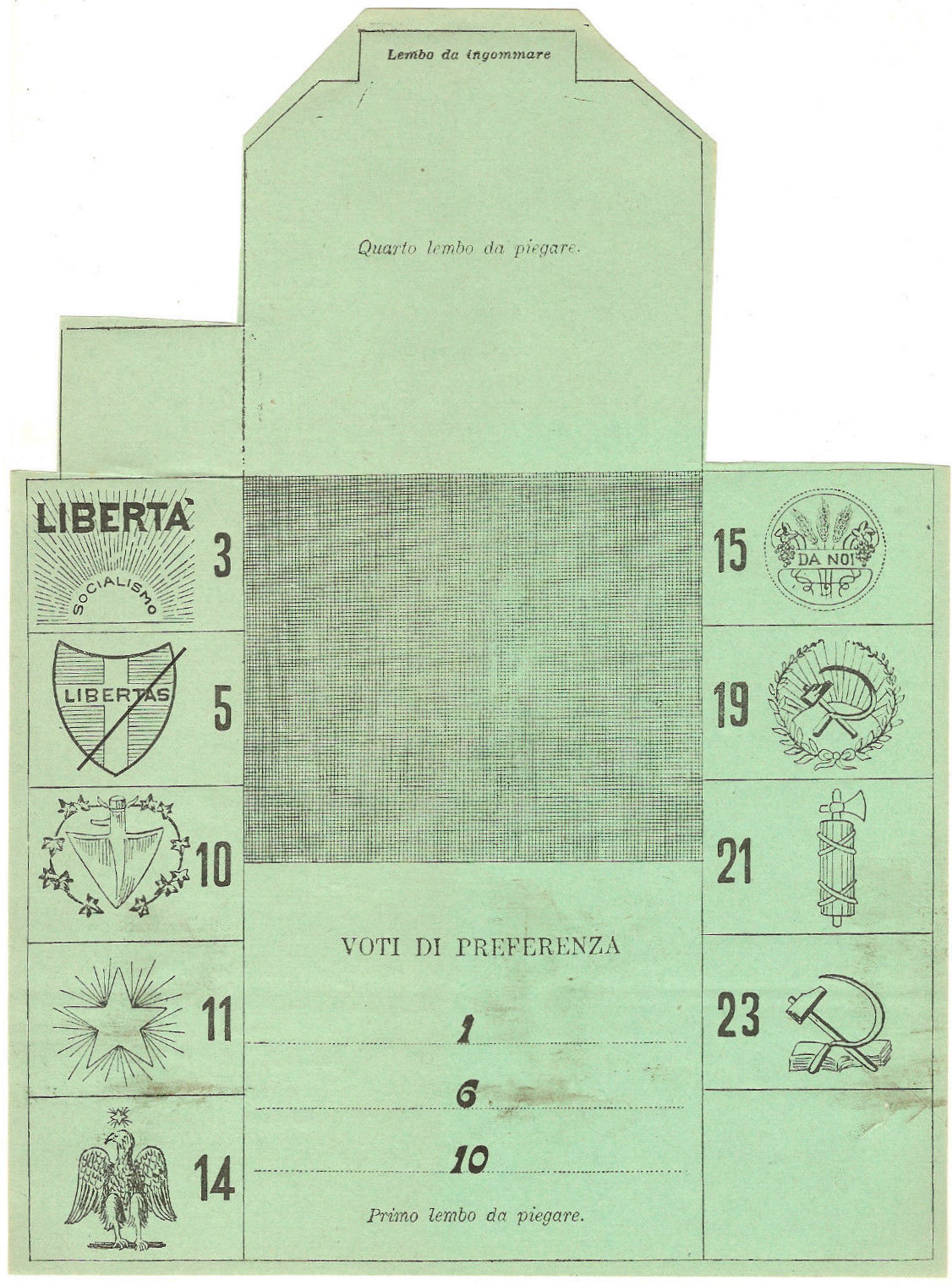
Ballot paper used in the election

Party	Votes	%	Seats	+/–
National List	4,305,936	60.09	355	+250
Italian People's Party	645,789	9.01	39	−69
Unitary Socialist Party	422,957	5.90	24	New
Italian Socialist Party	360,694	5.03	22	−101
National List bis	347,552	4.85	19	New
Communist Party of Italy	268,191	3.74	19	+4
Liberals	233,521	3.26	15	−28
Constitutional Opposition	157,932	2.20	14	−54
Italian Republican Party	133,714	1.87	7	+1
Social Democracy	111,035	1.55	10	−19
Peasants' Party of Italy	73,569	1.03	4	New
Lists of Slavs and Germans	62,491	0.87	4	−5
Sardinian Action Party	24,059	0.34	2	New
National Fasces	18,062	0.25	1	New
Total	7,165,502	100.00	535	0
Valid votes	7,165,502	94.10		
Invalid/blank votes	448,949	5.90		
Total votes	7,614,451	100.00		
Registered voters/turnout	11,939,452	63.78		

Popular vote
LN	64.94%
PPI	9.01%
PSU	5.90%
PSI	5.03%
PCdI	3.74%
Liberals	3.26%
OC	2.20%
PRI	1.87%
DS	1.55%
PdCdI	1.03%
SeT	0.87%
PSdAz	0.34%
FN	0.25%

Parliamentary seats
LN	69.91%
PPI	7.29%
PSU	4.49%
PSI	4.11%
PCdI	3.55%
Liberals	2.80%
OC	2.62%
DS	1.87%
PRI	1.31%
PdCdI	0.75%
SeT	0.75%
PSdAz	0.37%
FN	0.19%

=== By region ===
Region	First party	Second party	Third party
Abruzzo-Molise	LN	PSU	OC
Apulia	LN	Liberals	PCdI
Basilicata	LN	OC	DS
Calabria	LN	OC	DS
Campania	LN	OC	PSU
Emilia-Romagna	LN	PPI	PSU
Lazio	LN	PPI	PSI
Liguria	LN	PSU	PPI
Lombardy	LN	PPI	PSU
Marche	LN	PPI	PSU
Piedmont	LN	PLI	PSU
Sardinia	LN	PSdAz	PPI
Sicily	LN	DS	OC
Trentino	LN	PPI	SeT
Tuscany	LN	PSU	PPI
Umbria	LN	PPI	PSI
Veneto	LN	PPI	PSI
Venezia Giulia	LN	PPI	SeT

== Analysis and aftermath ==
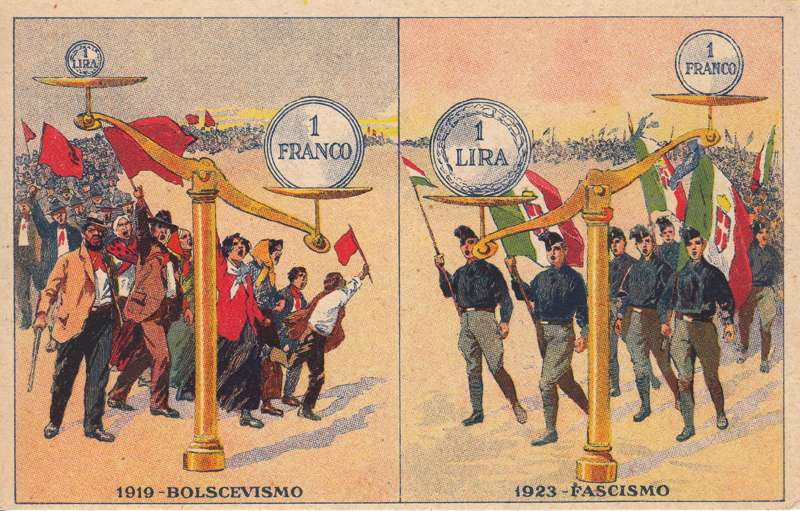
Postcard promoted by the Fascist propaganda, showing their view of the conflict between fascists and socialists

Voter intimidation allowed the National List and its decoy "National List bis" to secure 64.94% of all valid votes cast, thus winning a two-thirds supermajority under the Acerbo Law with a total of 374 seats (355 for the main list, 19 for the decoy): National Fasces (a splinter fascist party that opposed Benito Mussolini) won a single seat with 0.25%.

Opposition parties that took part in the previous election suffered substantial losses due to the Acerbo law: the biggest losses were borne by the Italian Socialist Party (from 123 to 22 seats) and the Italian People's Party (from 108 to 39); the Peasants' Party of Italy, Sardinian Action Party and Unitary Socialist Party entered the chamber for the first time, but their presence was short-lived as by November 1926 (according to Nathaniel Cantor for the Journal of Criminal Law & Criminology in 1936), Italy became a one-party state under the National Fascist Party.

A few weeks after the election, Giacomo Matteotti, the leader of the Unitary Socialist Party, requested during his speech in front of the Parliament that the elections be annulled because of the irregularities. On June 10, Matteotti was assassinated by the Blackshirts and his murder provoked a momentary crisis in the Mussolini government. The opposition parties responded weakly or were generally unresponsive. Many of the socialists, liberals, and moderates boycotted Parliament in the Aventine Secession, hoping to force the King to dismiss Mussolini.

On 31 December 1924 Blackshirt leaders met with Mussolini and gave him an ultimatum—crush the opposition or they would do so without him. Fearing a revolt by his own militants, he decided to drop all trappings of democracy. On 3 January 1925, Mussolini made a truculent speech before the Chamber of Deputies in which he took responsibility for squadristi violence but did not mention the assassination of Matteotti. This speech usually is taken as the beginning of the Fascist dictatorship because it was followed by several laws restricting or canceling common democratic liberties, all rubber-stamped by a Fascist-controlled Parliament.
