= Lists of Slavs and Germans =

Lists of Slavs and Germans Liste di Slavi e Tedeschi
- Ideology: German minority interests Slovene minority interests
- Political position: Big tent

The Lists of Slavs and Germans (Italian: Liste di Slavi e Tedeschi) was the collective name given to the political parties representing Slovene and German minorities in northern Italy between World War I and the Fascist regime.

Most Slovene-speakers resided in the Julian March, most German-speakers in South Tyrol.

== History ==
In the Julian March the list was organised by Josip Vilfan. In South Tyrol it consisted of the Deutscher Verband (DV), a political party formed by the merger of the Christian-democratic Tiroler Volkspartei (TVP) and the national-liberal Deutschfreiheitliche Partei (DFP); the DV was successively led by Eduard Reut-Nicolussi and Karl Tinzl.

In the 1921 general election the Lists won a combined 1.3% of the vote and 9 seats in the Chamber of Deputies.

In the 1924 general election the Lists won a combined 0.9% and 4 seats.

In 1922 the Lists opposed the formation of Benito Mussolini's Fascist government, which would forbid other languages and all the parties except the National Fascist Party. Consequently, the Lists ceased to exist.

== Election results ==
=== Chamber of Deputies ===
Chamber of Deputies
Election	Votes	%	Seats	+/–	Leader	Government
1921	88,648 (11th)	1.3	9 / 535	–	Collective leadership	Opposition
1924	62,491 (12th)	0.9	4 / 535	▼5	Collective leadership	Opposition

==== Results by districts ====
Election year	District	Votes	%	Seats	+/−
1921	Bolzano	36,664 (1st)	90.2	4 / 4	–
1921	Gorizia	34,639 (1st)	60.0	4 / 5	–
1921	Parenzo	11,215 (2nd)	21.4	1 / 6	–
1921	Trento	3,200 (5th)	4.5	0 / 7	–
1921	Trieste	2,930 (5th)	8.8	0 / 4	–
1924	Veneto	32,644 (5th)	4.9	2 / 53	▼2
1924	Venezia Giulia	29.847 (2nd)	11.1	2 / 23	▼3
