= Antonio Pogatschnig =

Antonio Pogatschnig

Antonio Pogatschnig was a provincial administrative official in Istria, politician and archeologist. He was born in Parenzo (Poreč) on April 26, 1866. He obtained a doctorate in Law. He served as Deputy Provincial Commissioner of Istria, Director of the Accounting Department of the province and as Director of the Federation of Cooperative Societies of Istria.

As an archeologist, Pogatsching illustrated the antique remains of his home town, including the Euphrasian Basilica and the Roman monuments.

He was elected to the Chamber of Deputies in the 1921 Italian general election, as a candidate of the National Bloc in the Parenzo electoral college. In parliament he joined the Liberal Democratic Club.

Pogatschnig died in Parenzo on January 31, 1924.
