= Chamber of Deputies (Italy) =

Lower house of the Italian Parliament

Coordinates: 41°54′5″N 12°28′43″E

Chamber of Deputies Camera dei Deputati
- 19th legislature (list)

Type
- Type: Lower house of the Italian Parliament

Leadership
- President: Lorenzo Fontana, Lega since 14 October 2022
- Vice Presidents: Fabio Rampelli (FdI); Giorgio Mulé (FI); Anna Ascani (PD); Sergio Costa (M5S) since 19 October 2022

Structure
- Seats: 400
- Political groups: Government (223): FdI (117) (Note: FdI (116); DCR (1)); Lega (54) (Note: Lega (54) (Note: LCD (1))); FI–PPE (52); Supported by (13): NM–MAIE–CP (8); Mixed (5) (Note: ScN (3) (Note: FdI (2); ScN (1)); Non-iscrits (2) (Note: UdC (1); Ind. (1))); Opposition (162): PD–IDP (68) (Note: PD (67); DemoS (1)); M5S (48); AZ–PER–RE (10); AVS (9); IV–CR (7); Mixed (20) (Note: FN (9); Linguistic minorities (4) (Note: SVP (3); UV (1)); +E (3); Non-Inscrits (4) (Note: CD (1); PLD (1); Ind. (1); PP (1))); Vacant (2)

Elections
- Voting system: Mixed-member majoritarian representation: 148 FPTP seats, 252 PR seats with 3% electoral threshold (D'Hondt method)
- Last election: 25 September 2022
- Next election: On or before 22 December 2027

Meeting place
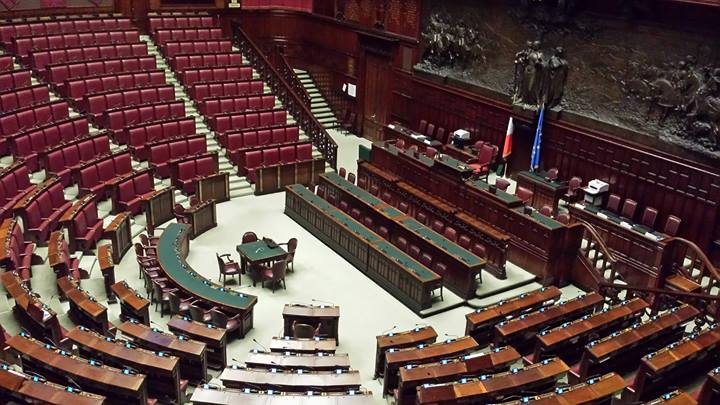
- Palazzo Montecitorio, Rome

Website
- en.camera.it camera.it

Rules
- Rules of Procedure of the Chamber of Deputies (English)

The Chamber of Deputies (Italian: Camera dei deputati) is the lower house of the bicameral Italian Parliament, the upper house being the Senate of the Republic. The two houses together form a perfect bicameral system, meaning they perform identical functions, but do so separately. The Chamber of Deputies has 400 seats, of which 392 are elected from Italian constituencies, and 8 from Italian citizens living abroad. Deputies are styled The Honourable (Italian: Onorevole) and meet at Palazzo Montecitorio.

== Location ==
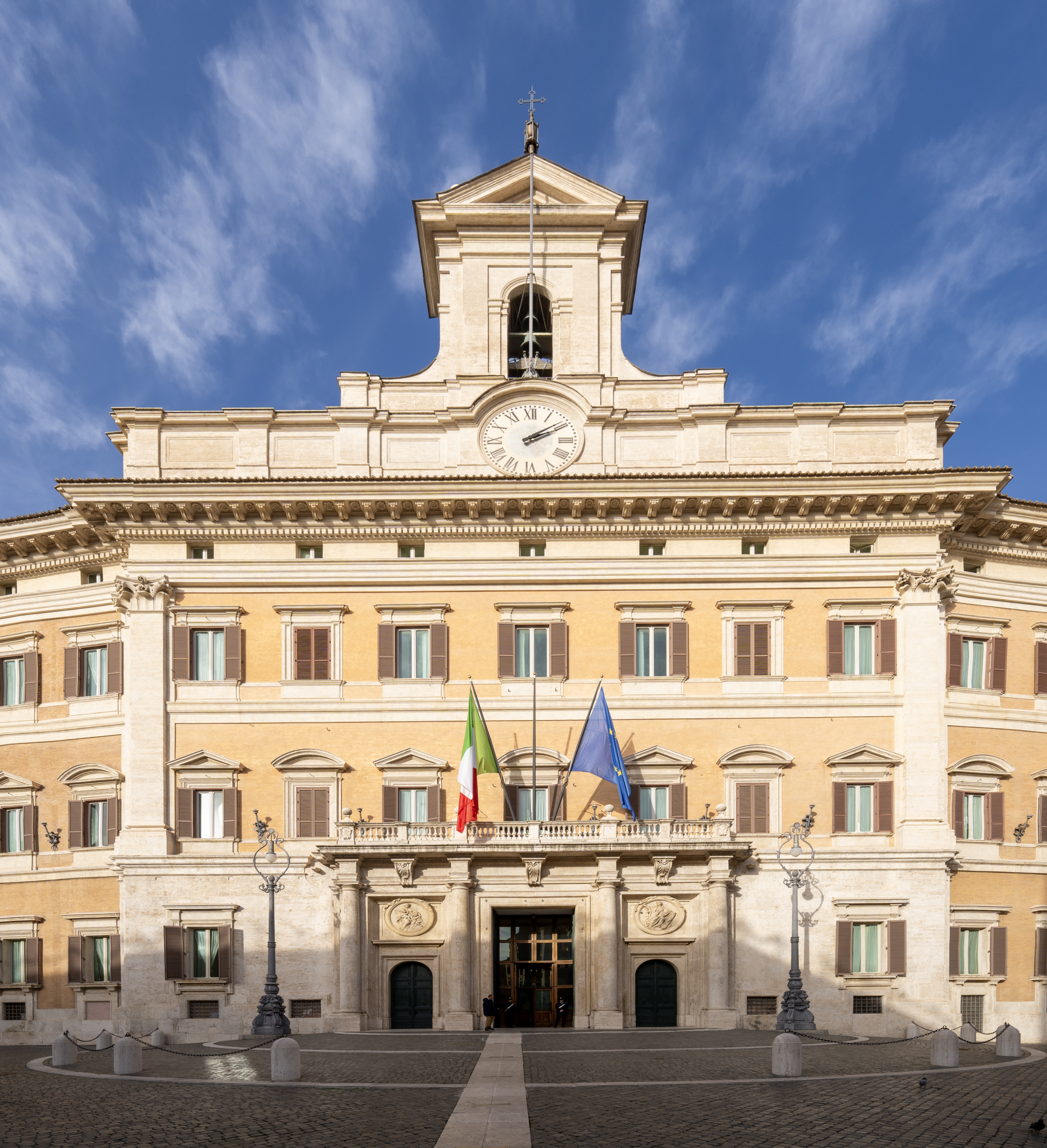
Palazzo Montecitorio

The seat of the Chamber of Deputies is the Palazzo Montecitorio, where it has met since 1871, shortly after the capital of the Kingdom of Italy was moved to Rome at the successful conclusion of the Italian unification Risorgimento movement.

Previously, the seat of the Chamber of Deputies of the Kingdom of Italy had been briefly at the Palazzo Carignano in Turin (1861–1865) and the Palazzo Vecchio in Florence (1865–1871). Under the Fascist regime of Benito Mussolini, the Chamber of Deputies was abolished and replaced by the figurehead Chamber of Fasces and Corporations from 1939 to 1943 (during World War II).

== Normal operation ==
The Chamber is composed of all members meeting in session at the Montecitorio. The assembly also has the right to attend meetings of the Government and its ministers. If required, the Government is obliged to attend the session. Conversely, the Government has the right to be heard every time it requires.

The term of office of the House (as well as the Senate) is five years, but can be extended in two cases:

- The "prorogatio", as provided by art. 61.2 of the Constitution, states that deputies whose terms have expired shall continue to exercise their functions until the first meeting of the new Chamber.
- An extension of the term, provided for by art. 60.2, can be enacted only in case of war.

== Electoral system ==
The electoral system is a mixed-member majoritarian with 37% of seats allocated using first-past-the-post voting (FPTP) and 63% using proportional representation, allocated with the largest remainder method, with one round of voting.

The 400 deputies are elected in:

- 147 in single-member constituencies, by plurality;
- 245 in multi-member constituencies, by national proportional representation;
- 8 in multi-member abroad constituencies, by constituency proportional representation.

For Italian residents, each house members are elected by single ballots, including the constituency candidate and his supporting party lists. In each single-member constituency the deputy/senator is elected on a plurality basis, while the seats in multi-member constituencies will be allocated nationally. In order to be calculated in single-member constituency results, parties need to obtain at least 1% of the national vote. In order to receive seats in multi-member constituencies, parties need to obtain at least 3% of the national vote. Elects from multi-member constituencies will come from closed lists.

The single voting paper, containing both first-past-the-post candidates and the party lists, shows the names of the candidates to single-member constituencies and, in close conjunction with them, the symbols of the linked lists for the proportional part, each one with a list of the relative candidates.

The voter can cast his vote in three different ways:

- Drawing a sign on the symbol of a list: in this case the vote extends to the candidate in the single-member constituency which is supported by that list.
- Drawing a sign on the name of the candidate of the single-member constituency and another one on the symbol of one list that supports them: the result is the same as that described above; it is not allowed, under penalty of annulment, the panachage, so the voter can not vote simultaneously for a candidate in the FPTP constituency and for a list which is not linked to them.
- Drawing a sign only on the name of the candidate for the FPTP constituency, without indicating any list: in this case, the vote is valid for the candidate in the single-member constituency and also automatically extended to the list that supports them; if that candidate is however connected to several lists, the vote is divided proportionally between them, based on the votes that each one has obtained in that constituency.

Article 61 of the Italian Constitution maintains that elections for the Chamber of Deputies must take place within 70 days of the dissolution of the house, and that representatives must convene within 20 days of those elections.

== President ==
The President of the Chamber of Deputies (Presidente della Camera dei Deputati) performs the role of speaker of the house and is elected during the first session after the election. During this time the prerogatives of speaker are assumed by the vice president of Chamber of Deputies of the previous legislature who was elected first. If two were elected simultaneously, the oldest deputy serves as president of Chamber of Deputies.

The President of Chamber of Deputies has also the role of President during the Parliament joint sessions, when the upper and lower houses have to vote together.

Lorenzo Fontana is the current president of the Chamber of Deputies.

Name	Period	Legislature
Giovanni Gronchi (DC)	8 May 1948 – 29 April 1955	I, II
Giovanni Leone (DC)	10 May 1955 – 21 June 1963	II, III, IV
Brunetto Bucciarelli-Ducci (DC)	26 June 1963 – 4 June 1968	IV
Sandro Pertini (PSI)	5 June 1968 – 4 July 1976	V, VI
Pietro Ingrao (PCI)	5 July 1976 – 19 June 1979	VII
Nilde Iotti (PCI)	20 June 1979 – 22 April 1992	VIII, IX, X
Oscar Luigi Scalfaro (DC)	24 April 1992 – 25 May 1992	XI
Giorgio Napolitano (PDS)	3 June 1992 – 14 April 1994	XI
Irene Pivetti (LN)	16 April 1994 – 8 May 1996	XII
Luciano Violante (PDS)	10 May 1996 – 29 May 2001	XIII
Pier Ferdinando Casini (CCD)	31 May 2001 – 27 April 2006	XIV
Fausto Bertinotti (PRC)	29 April 2006 – 28 April 2008	XV
Gianfranco Fini (PdL)	30 April 2008 – 14 March 2013	XVI
Laura Boldrini (SEL)	16 March 2013 – 22 March 2018	XVII
Roberto Fico (M5S)	24 March 2018 – 12 October 2022	XVIII
Lorenzo Fontana (Lega)	since 14 October 2022	XIX

== Membership ==
The Chamber has 400 members. They were most recently elected at the 2022 general election.

== Reform proposals ==
In 2019, the Italian parliament passed a constitutional law that reduces the number of the deputies from 630 to 400. The law was approved in the 2020 constitutional referendum.

The 19th Legislature was the first in which the Chamber of Deputies had 400 members.

== Historical composition ==
=== 1861–1924 ===
PCI / PSI / PSU / PSdA / PRI / Far Left/PR / PSRI / PDR / Dissident Left / Left / PD / PDC / PDSI / PLDI / Others / Independent / Vacant / SeT / PPI / UL/PLI / UECI / Right / PE / PdC / CC / BN/LN
1861	14 / 62 / 25 / 342
1865	15 / 156 / 89 / 183
1867	225 / 74 / 43 / 151
1870	195 / 56 / 24 / 233
1874	232 / 276
1876	414 / 94
1880	119 / 218 / 171
1882	44 / 19 / 289 / 9 / 147
1886	45 / 26 / 292 / 145
1890	42 / 401 / 17 / 48
1892	56 / 323 / 36 / 93
1895	15 / 47 / 334 / 8 / 104
1897	15 / 25 / 42 / 327 / 99
1900	33 / 29 / 34 / 296 / 116
1904	29 / 24 / 37 / 339 / 3 / 76
1904	29 / 24 / 37 / 339 / 3 / 76
1909	41 / 24 / 45 / 336 / 10 / 16 / 36
1913	60 / 17 / 73 / 19 / 11 / 29 / 270 / 20 / 9
1919	157 / 4 / 12 / 6 / 60 / 96 / 5 / 100 / 41 / 7 / 20
1921	15 / 124 / 6 / 11 / 29 / 68 / 2 / 9 / 108 / 43 / 5 / 10 / 105
1924	19 / 22 / 24 / 2 / 7 / 10 / 14 / 1 / 4 / 39 / 15 / 374

=== Since 1945 ===
DP/PdUP / PCI / PSIUP / PSI / US/PSDI / FdV / PdA / PSdA / PR / PRI / UV/VdA / SVP / MIS / Others / DC / UDN/PLI / UQ / PMP / BNI / PNM/PDIUM / MSI
1946	104 / 115 / 7 / 2 / 23 / 4 / 7 / 207 / 41 / 30 / 16
1948	130 / 53 / 33 / 1 / 9 / 3 / 1 / 305 / 14 / 5 / 14 / 6
1953	143 / 75 / 19 / 5 / 3 / 263 / 13 / 40 / 29
1958	140 / 84 / 22 / 6 / 1 / 3 / 1 / 273 / 17 / 14 / 11 / 24
1963	166 / 87 / 33 / 6 / 1 / 3 / 260 / 39 / 8 / 27
1968	177 / 23 / 62 / 29 / 9 / 3 / 266 / 31 / 6 / 24
1972	179 / 61 / 29 / 15 / 1 / 3 / 266 / 20 / 56
1976	6 / 228 / 57 / 15 / 4 / 14 / 3 / 1 / 262 / 5 / 35
1979	6 / 201 / 62 / 20 / 18 / 16 / 1 / 4 / 1 / 262 / 9 / 30
1983	7 / 198 / 73 / 23 / 11 / 29 / 1 / 1 / 3 / 1 / 225 / 16 / 42
1987	8 / 177 / 94 / 17 / 13 / 13 / 21 / 2 / 1 / 3 / 1 / 234 / 11 / 35

PRC / PDS / PSI / PSDI / FdV / PR / PRI / LR / VdA / SVP / Others / DC / PLI / LN / MSI
1992	35 / 107 / 92 / 16 / 16 / 7 / 27 / 12 / 1 / 3 / 2 / 206 / 17 / 55 / 34

PRC / PdCI / PDS/DS / PSI / FdV / NPSI / AD / SDI / LR / IdV / DL / RI / PPI / UDEUR / VdA / SVP / Others / PS / CCD+CDU/UDC / FI / LN / AN
1994	38 / 125 / 15 / 11 / 16 / 8 / 33 / 1 / 3 / 1 / 13 / 27 / 111 / 118 / 110
1996	35 / 172 / 14 / 3 / 26 / 69 / 1 / 3 / 2 / 30 / 123 / 59 / 93
2001	11 / 10 / 136 / 17 / 3 / 83 / 1 / 3 / 3 / 40 / 194 / 30 / 99
2006	41 / 16 / 123 / 15 / 4 / 18 / 17 / 90 / 10 / 4 / 15 / 39 / 140 / 26 / 72

SEL / AVS / LeU / PD / M5S / A–IV / CD / IdV / SC / VdA / SVP / Others / UdC / NM / MpA / PdL/FI / LN/LSP / FdI
2008	217 / 29 / 2 / 2 / 36 / 8 / 276 / 60
2013	37 / 297 / 109 / 6 / 39 / 1 / 5 / 3 / 8 / 98 / 18 / 9
2018	14 / 112 / 227 / 4 / 12 / 104 / 125 / 32
2022	12 / 69 / 52 / 21 / 1 / 3 / 5 / 7 / 45 / 66 / 119

== Predecessors ==
- Chamber of Deputies (Kingdom of Sardinia) — 4 March 1848 to 17 March 1861
- Chamber of Deputies (Kingdom of Italy) — 17 March 1861 to 23 March 1939
- Chamber of Fasces and Corporations — 23 March 1939 to 2 August 1943
- National Council (Italy) — 25 September 1945 to 2 June 1946
- Constituent Assembly of Italy — 2 June 1946 to 31 January 1948

== See also ==
- Bicameralism
- Chamber of Deputies
- Italian Parliament
- Italian Senate
- Camera dei Deputati (TV channel)
