= Economic Party =

Economic Party refers to:

- Economic Party (Germany)
- Economic Party (Italy)
- Economic Party (South West Africa)
- Economic Party (Thailand)
