= Kurt Gattinger =

Austrian politician

Personal details
- Born: 1 September 1914 Innsbruck, Austria
- Died: 13 January 2007 (aged 92)
- Party: ÖVP
- Education: Dr. iur. (law degree)
- Profession: Ss-officer, politician, ceo

Kurt Gattinger (1 September 1914 – 13 January 2007) was a Nazi SS-Officer and an Austrian politician.

== Early life ==
In 1932 Gattinger completed his final exams.

== Career ==
=== Nazi SS member ===
In Berlin in 1934, he joined the Leibstandarte SS, which had been established by Sepp Dietrich in 1933. He took part in the attack on Poland as a member of the SS Regiment "Germany". In 1940, Gattinger was employed in an SS artillery regiment in the western campaign in Normandy. On the Eastern Front, he was chief of an artillery battery of the 5th SS Panzer Division "Wiking". In 1940 he received the Iron Cross as superintendent, and in 1942 as SS-Hauptsturmführer during the fighting in the Elbrusgebiet. In the campaign against the USSR he was the battery commander of the 5th SS Panzer Division Wiking.

=== Political career ===
Kurt Gattinger joined the ÖVP-Tirol in 1948 and in 1953 became the Secretary of ÖVP-Tirol. Gattinger was well known for organizing of the "pardon action" for former National Socialists members. Gattinger also founded organizations such as Wohnungseigentum and "Die Brücke".

His political career ended when, on 27 February 1967, the police showed up in the offices of WE. As managing director, he was suspected of financial infidelity. In 1969, he was found guilty of a breach of trust and sentenced to one year in prison.

== Awards ==
- 1942 the German Cross in gold
- 1980 Order of merit of Tyrol
