= Deutscher Verband =

Deutscher Verband German Association
- Founded: 1919
- Dissolved: 1926
- Merger of: Tiroler Volkspartei; Deutschfreiheitliche Partei
- Succeeded by: South Tyrolean People's Party (not legal successor)
- Ideology: German-speaking minority interests Regionalism; Autonomism; Conservatism; Christian democracy (minority); German nationalism (minority); National liberalism (minority)
- Political position: Right-wing
- National affiliation: Lists of Slavs and Germans

The Deutscher Verband was a coalition of right-leaning German-speaking political parties that was formed in South Tyrol in 1919 after the region was annexed by Italy. It was a merger of the Catholic Tiroler Volkspartei and the national liberal Deutschfreiheitliche Partei. The German-speaking Social Democrats joined with the Italian Socialist Party.

At the 1921 Italian general election the coalition won 90% of the vote and elected all four of the deputies that were allotted to the region. The first leader of the Deutscher Verband was Eduard Reut-Nicolussi. In 1923 he was replaced by the lawyer Karl Tinzl. The most important press organ of the DV, until its prohibition, was the Tiroler (after 1923, Der Landsmann).

The DV as banned along with the rest of the non-Fascist parties in 1926. After 1945, the political tradition of the DV was continued by the South Tyrolean People's Party, which had the same leaders, and also used the edelweiss as its election symbol.
