= Combatants' Party =

Former Italian political party

Combatants' Party Partito dei Combattenti
- Founded: 1919; 107 years ago
- Dissolved: 1923; 103 years ago
- Ideology: Italian nationalism Veterans' interests Italian irredentism

The Combatants' Party (Italian: Partito dei Combattenti, PdC) was a nationalist political party in Italy, whose aim was to protect the interests of First World War veterans.

== History ==
It was formed for the 1919 general election and gained 4.1% of the vote and 20 seats in the Chamber of Deputies. The party joined the leftist Italian Socialist Party of Nicola Bombacci as part of the opposition against the Christian democrat and liberal majority.

On 17 August 1920 the Combatants' Party changed its name into Party of Renewal (Partito del Rinnovamento) or Group of Renewal (Gruppo del Rinnovamento), also opening up to non-combatants, but causing a schism by a large number of sections, some of which wanted to maintain the non-partisan independence of the Association, while other sections proposed to found an Italian action party.

By the 1921 election it had declined and won only 1.7% of the vote and 10 seats. This time they joined the governing coalition of the right headed up by the Italian People's Party and the National Bloc.

== Electoral results ==
Chamber of Deputies
Election year	Votes	%	Seats	+/−	Leader
1919	232,923 (6th)	4.1	20 / 508	–	several
1921	113,839 (10th)	1.7	10 / 535	▼10	several
