= Delogu =

Delogu is a surname.

== List of people with the surname ==
- Mariano Delogu (1933–2016), Italian politician
- Sébastien Delogu, (born 1987), French politician

== See also ==
- Delgo, 2008 film
