= Zedda =

Zedda is an Italian surname. Notable people with the surname include:

- Alberto Zedda (1928–2017), Italian conductor and musicologist
- Massimo Zedda (born 1976), Italian politician
