= List of mayors of Cagliari =

Mayor of Cagliari
- Sindaco di Cagliari

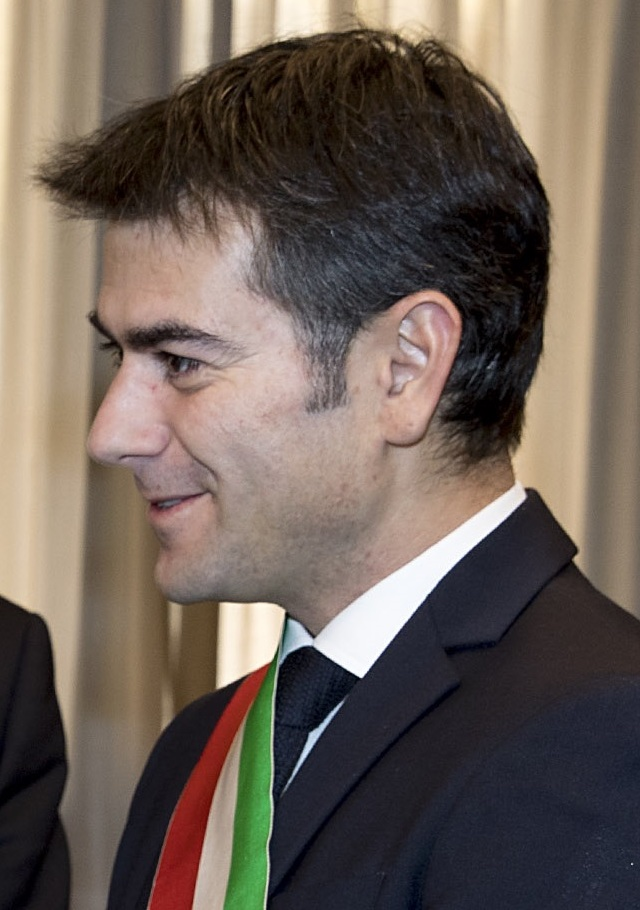
- Incumbent; Massimo Zedda (PP) since 17 June 2024
- Style: No title, courtesy or style
- Appointer: Popular election
- Term length: Five years, renewable once
- Formation: 1848
- Website: comune.cagliari.it

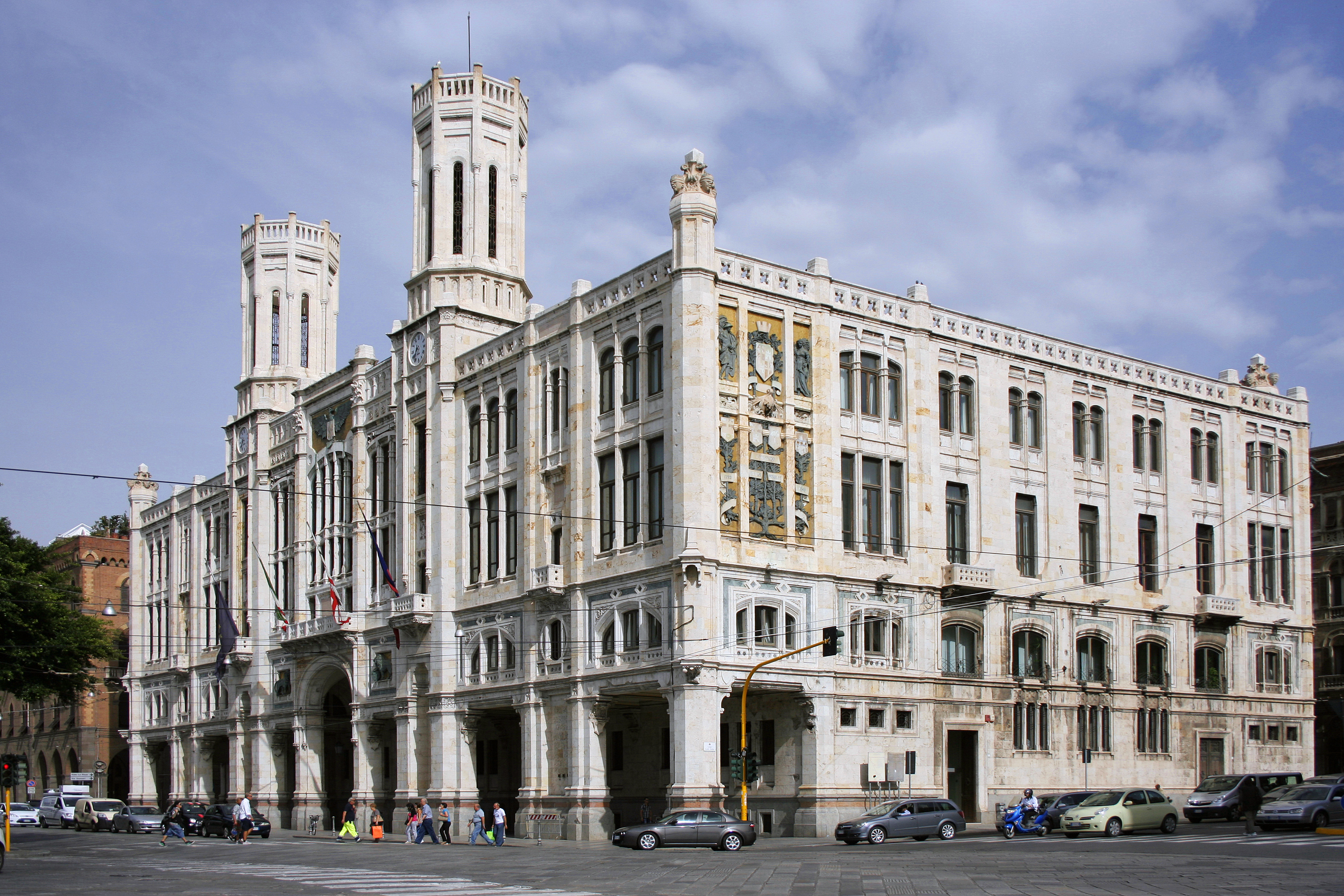
Cagliari Town Hall.

The Mayor of Cagliari is an elected politician who, along with the Cagliari's City Council, is accountable for the strategic government of Cagliari in Sardinia, Italy.

The elected Mayor is Massimo Zedda, a member of the centre-left party Progressive Party, elected on 9 June 2024.

== Overview ==
According to the Italian Constitution, the Mayor of Cagliari is member of the City Council.

The Mayor is elected by the population of Cagliari, who also elects the members of the City Council, controlling the Mayor's policy guidelines and is able to enforce his resignation by a motion of no confidence. The Mayor is entitled to appoint and release the members of his government.

Since 1994 the Mayor is elected directly by Cagliari's electorate: in all mayoral elections in Italy in cities with a population higher than 15,000 the voters express a direct choice for the mayor or an indirect choice voting for the party of the candidate's coalition. If no candidate receives at least 50% of votes, the top two candidates go to a second round after two weeks. The election of the City Council is based on a direct choice for the candidate with a preference vote: the candidate with the majority of the preferences is elected. The number of the seats for each party is determined proportionally.

== Kingdom of Sardinia (1848–1861) ==
The office of Mayor of Cagliari (Sindaco di Cagliari) was created in 1848 after the promulgation of the Albertine Statute.

	Mayor	Term start	Term end	Party
1	Fortunato Cossu Baille	1849	1850	
2	Antioco Loru	1851	1852	
3	Edmondo Roberti	1853	1856	
4	Tommaso Marini Demuro	1857	1859	
5	Giovanni Meloni Baille	1860	1861	

== Kingdom of Italy (1861–1946) ==
Initially appointed by the King, the Mayor of Cagliari was elected by the City council from 1899 to 1926. In 1926, the Fascist dictatorship abolished mayors and City councils, replacing them with an authoritarian Podestà chosen by the National Fascist Party. The office of Mayor was restored in 1944 during the Allied occupation.

	Mayor	Term start	Term end	Party
5	Giovanni Meloni Baille	1861	1862	
(3)	Edmondo Roberti	1863	1875	
6	Francesco Cocco-Ortu	1882	1883	
7	Salvatore Marcello	1883	1884	
8	Emanuele Ravot	1884	1888	
9	Ottone Bacaredda	1890	1902	
10	Giuseppe Picinelli	1902	1904	
(9)	Ottone Bacaredda	1904	1910	
11	Francesco Nobilioni	1910	1911	
(9)	Ottone Bacaredda	1911	1917	
(9)	Ottone Bacaredda	1920	1921	
12	Gavino Dessì Deliperi	1921	1923	
Fascist Podestà (1926–1944)
1	Vittorio Tredici	1926	1928	PNF
2	Enrico Endrich	1928	1934	PNF
3	Giovanni Cao	1934	1935	PNF
4	Angelo Prunas	1935	1942	PNF
Allied occupation (1944–1946)
(12)	Gavino Dessì Deliperi	1944	1944	
13	Cesare Pintus	1944	1946	PdA

== Italian Republic (since 1946) ==
=== City Council election (1946–1994) ===
From 1946 to 1994, the Mayor of Cagliari was elected by the City Council.

	Mayor	Term start	Term end	Party
1	Luigi Crespellani	1946	1949	DC
2	Pietro Leo	1949	1956	DC
3	Mario Palomba	1956	1960	DC
4	Antonio Follese	1960	1960	DC
5	Giuseppe Peretti	1960	1960	DC
6	Giuseppe Brotzu	1960	1967	DC
7	Paolo De Magistris	1967	1970	DC
8	Angelo Lai	1970	1971	DC
9	Eudoro Fanti	1971	1972	DC
10	Franco Murtas	1972	1975	DC
11	Salvatore Ferrara	1975	1979	PSI
12	Mario De Sotgiu	1979	1980	DC
13	Michele Columbu	1980	1980	PSd'Az
14	Bachisio Scarpa	1980	1981	DC
15	Michele Di Martino	1981	1984	DC
(7)	Paolo De Magistris	1984	1990	DC
16	Roberto Dal Cortivo	1990	1992	PSI
17	Gaetano Giua Marassi	1992	1994	DC

=== Direct election (since 1994) ===
Since 1994, under provisions of new local administration law, the Mayor of Cagliari is chosen by direct election.

	Mayor	Term start	Term end	Party	Coalition	Election
18	Mariano Delogu (1933–2016)	28 June 1994	26 May 1998	AN	Pole of Good Government (FI-AN)	1994
18	Mariano Delogu (1933–2016)	26 May 1998	21 March 2001 (Note: Resigned after swearing in as senator. The special commissioner Giovanni Balsamo held the office till a municipal election was held.)	AN	Pole for Freedoms (FI-AN-CCD)	1998
Special Prefectural Commissioner tenure (21 March 2001 – 16 May 2001)
19	Emilio Floris (b. 1944)	16 May 2001	12 June 2006	FI; PdL	House of Freedoms (FI-AN-CCD-CDU-RS)	2001
19	Emilio Floris (b. 1944)	12 June 2006	1 June 2011	FI; PdL	House of Freedoms (FI-AN-UDC-RS)	2006
20	Massimo Zedda (b. 1976)	1 June 2011	6 June 2016	SEL; AP	PD • SEL • IdV • FdS and left-wing lists	2011
20	Massimo Zedda (b. 1976)	6 June 2016	5 April 2019 (Note: Resigned after being elected to the Regional Council of Sardinia. The special commissioner Bruno Carcangiu held the office till the 2019 local elections.)	SEL; AP	PD • SI • RM and left-wing lists	2016
Special Prefectural Commissioner tenure (5 April 2019 – 18 July 2019)
21	Paolo Truzzu (b. 1972)	18 July 2019	20 April 2024 (Note: Resigned after being elected to the Regional Council of Sardinia. The special commissioner Luisanna Marras held the office till the 2024 local elections.)	FdI	FdI • PSd’Az • RS; Lega • FI • UDC	2019
Special Prefectural Commissioner tenure (20 April 2024 – 17 June 2024)
(20)	Massimo Zedda (b. 1976)	17 June 2024	Incumbent	PP	PD • PP • M5S • AVS	2024

== See also ==
- Timeline of Cagliari
