= Hiromi Asai =

Fashion designer

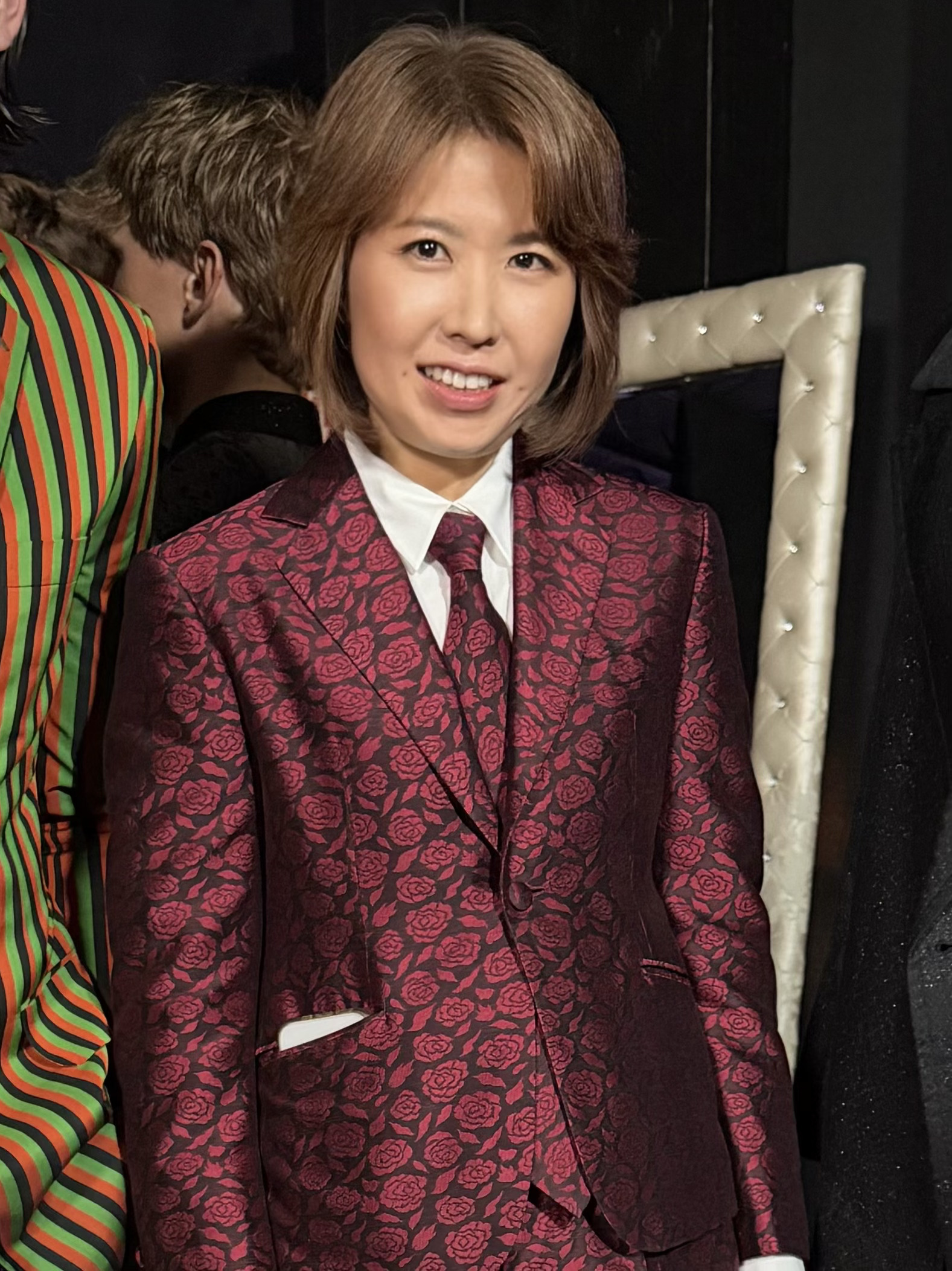
Hiromi Asai

Hiromi Asai is a Japanese-born American fashion designer based in New York City.

== Biography and career ==
After moving to New York City in 2008, Asai ran kimono dressing classes and related services under the name Kimono Hiro in NY. Her classes were profiled in ''The New York Times'' in 2009.

Early coverage of Asai’s work described themes that continued in later collections, including an emphasis on kimono textiles and craftsmanship. Her work with kimonos was later featured in ''Collezioni Donna'' in 2011 and ''Collezioni Haute Couture'' in 2012.

In 2015, Asai organized a crowdfunding campaign for a New York Fashion Week presentation with Japanese kimono craftsmen. In 2016, she presented a collection of authentic kimono at New York Fashion Week. The presentation was covered by NBC News, Newsweek, The Independent and Japanese newspapers.

Beginning in 2017, Asai shifted her focus to menswear. She began working directly with Japanese craftsmen to develop textiles using traditional dyeing and weaving techniques. These textiles became a central part of her menswear collections.

In 2017, she presented her first menswear collection at Pitti Uomo in Florence.

After 2017, Asai continued to present collections in New York and Paris. Her later work continued to use textiles and techniques associated with kimono production.
