= Deutschfreiheitliche Partei =

Political party in Austria-Hungary

The Deutschfreiheitliche Partei (in English, German Freedom Party, in Italian Partito Libertario Tedesco) was a political party active in Tyrol at the end of the 19th and the beginning of the 20th century. It had a Liberal-national orientation.

It originated in 1880 from a section of the German Liberal Party, which was active across Austria. This new party, however, was only active in the County of Tyrol. Among the major leasers of the party were Julius Perathoner, the burgomaster of Bolzano from 1895 to 1922.

Active in Alto Adige (South Tyrol) after its annexation to Italy after World War I, the part ran in the 1921 election in a coalition with the Tiroler Volkspartei called the Deutscher Verband which won 90% of the German-speaking vote and elected four members to the Camera dei deputati - Eduard Reut-Nicolussi, Karl Tinzl, Friedrich von Toggenburg and Wilhelm von Walther.

In Austrian Tyrol, the party joined with the Großdeutsche Volkspartei in 1920/1921.
