= Antonio Stefano Benni =

Italian entrepreneur and politician

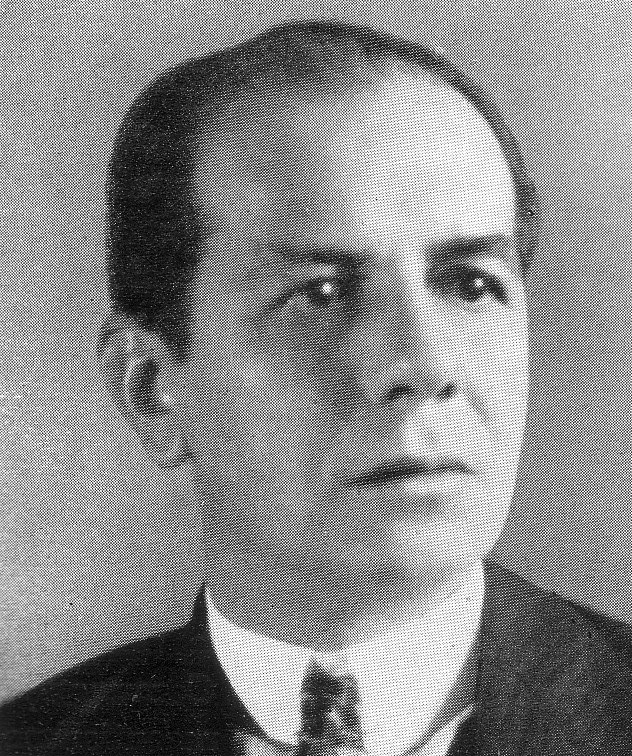

Minister of Communications
- In office 24 January 1935 – 31 October 1939
- Prime Minister: Benito Mussolini
- Preceded by: Umberto Puppini
- Succeeded by: Giovanni Host-Venturi

Member of the Chamber of Deputies
- In office 15 March 1931 – 27 December 1945

Member of the Chamber of Fasces and Corporations
- In office 23 March 1939 – 5 August 1943

Personal details
- Born: 18 April 1880 Cuneo, Kingdom of Italy
- Died: 27 December 1945 (aged 65) Lausanne, Switzerland
- Party: National Fascist Party
- Profession: entrepreneur

Antonio Giacomo Stefano Bruno Benni (18 April 1880 – 27 December 1945) was an Italian entrepreneur and politician who served as President of the General Confederation of Italian Industry from 1923 until 1934.

== Biography ==
His father, a financial intendant, died before his birth. He spent his childhood first in Cuneo and then, until 1883, in Milan. In 1894, forced by family to interrupt his studies, due to financial hardship, he stopped his studies and went to work as an apprentice for Ercole Marelli.

Marelli produced small electrical and mechanical equipment, and from 1896 embarked on the path of production specialization with the manufacture of electric fans. This choice decreed the success of the company and its rapid dimensional growth: Marelli was responsible for the technical aspects of production, while the young Benni soon took charge of the organizational and commercial management. To guarantee a large market and create an efficient network of representatives, starting from 1900 he made numerous trips to Europe and Latin America.

In a few years, Marelli's sales could be considerably on the domestic and foreign markets, and in 1905 Marelli and Benni decided to leave the city workshop to design and build, in seven months, a large factory in Sesto San Giovanni (Milan). The world conflict determined a further increase in the activities of Marelli which, in 1915, started the production of magnets. In 1919 Benni, together with Marelli and Giovanni Agnelli, established the Fabbrica Italiana Magneti Marelli, whose capital was paid in equal parts by Fiat and Marelli.

In 1922 Ercole Marelli died and his son Fermo took over the property. Benni assumed the presidency of the company and held the position from 1922 to 1935 when Fermo Marelli took over. He later covered several prestigious positions in prestigious banks, companies, and corporations. In the first post-war period, he was made a Knight of labour. He was a member of the Higher Council of Economy and Labor and in 1921 he was elected Deputy of the Kingdom of Italy.

In 1923 he was called to the presidency of Confindustria, a role he left to Alberto Pirelli in 1934.

Also in 1923, he participated in Mussolini's political campaign carried out by the industrialists, who self-taxed themselves in the measure of 2 per thousand of the capital of their companies to favour the propaganda operations of the nascent regime; also for this operation, he was one of the deputies elected with the Fascist list in 1924. In 1929 he was included again in the fascist list which was elected by popular plebiscite.

Starting from 24 January 1935, Benni held the position of Minister of Communications on behalf of the fascist government of Benito Mussolini. Benni remained in that role until 31 October 1939.

In the last years of his life, he reduced his political activity. After 8 September he refused to join the Italian Social Republic and indeed, on the night of 20 August 1944, while he was in Stresa, he was arrested together with his wife by fascist agents under the orders of the prefect of Novara. Taken to the local town hall, he was brutally beaten, then locked up in the prisons of the castle of Novara. Benni claimed he never knew exactly why they arrested him; he believed, however, that they wanted to force him to give his adhesion to the Fascist Republic. He was released after about a month.

On 27 April 1945, the National Liberation Committee of Upper Italy (C.L.N.A.I.), broadcasting from the microphones of Radio Milano Libertà, included his name among the arrest orders issued with its first executive decree. To escape both the persecution of fascist agents and the threats of anti-fascist partisans, Benni emigrated to Switzerland before the end of the conflict.

He died in Lausanne on 27 December 1945.
