= Costanzo Ciano =

Italian naval officer and politician (1876–1939)

Count of Cortellazzo Costanzo Ciano
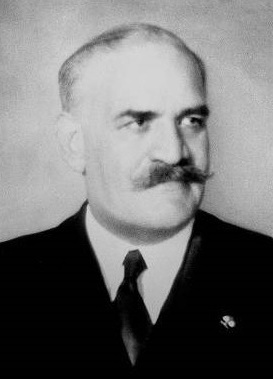

President of Chamber of Fasces and Corporations
- In office 23 March 1939 – 26 June 1939
- Preceded by: Office established
- Succeeded by: Dino Grandi

President of the Chamber of Deputies
- In office 28 April 1934 – 2 March 1939
- Preceded by: Giovanni Giuriati
- Succeeded by: Office abolished

Minister of Post and Telegraphs
- In office 5 February 1924 – 28 April 1934
- Prime Minister: Benito Mussolini
- Preceded by: Giovanni Antonio Colonna di Cesarò
- Succeeded by: Umberto Puppini

Member of the Chamber of Deputies
- In office 11 June 1921 – 2 March 1939
- Constituency: Tuscany

Personal details
- Born: 30 August 1876 Livorno, Italy
- Died: 26 June 1939 (aged 62) Lucca, Italy
- Party: National Fascist Party
- Children: Galeazzo Ciano
- Profession: Naval commander

Costanzo Ciano, 1st Count of Cortellazzo (Italian: [kosˈtantso ˈtʃaːno]; 30 August 1876 – 26 June 1939) was an Italian naval officer and politician. He was the father of the former Italian Minister for Foreign Affairs, Galeazzo Ciano.

== Biography ==
=== Early life ===
Born in Livorno, he was the son of Raimondo Ciano and his wife, Argia Puppo. He entered the Livorno Naval Academy in 1891, and was commissioned an officer five years later. In 1901, he became Ship-of-the-Line Lieutenant (tenente di vascello) and took part in the Italo-Turkish War of 1911–1912.

=== First World War ===
In 1915, before the entrance of Italy to the First World War, he was a capitano di corvetta (lieutenant commander) and was assigned to serve in Cirenaica.

After his return to Italy, he operated at the command of fast MAS units and received a gold medal for military value for a famous action in Bakar Harbour (10–11 February 1918) in the Croatian Littoral, which was later celebrated by the poet Gabriele D'Annunzio, who had also participated.

Ciano was promoted to the rank of capitano di vascello (captain) at the end of the war.

=== Postwar fascist ===
Ciano's ardent nationalism drew him into fascism. He became the leader of the Livorno fascio and participated in the March on Rome in October 1922.

On 31 October 1919, he assumed the post of Undersecretary of State for the Regia Marina and was Commissioner for the Merchant Navy. On 9 November 1923, he was appointed rear admiral in the Naval Reserve. In 1928, he was ennobled by King Victor Emmanuel III as Conte di Cortellazzo. He was the president of the Italian Chamber of Deputies from 1934 until his death, which occurred at Ponte a Moriano in 1939.

== Awards and decorations ==
Military decorations
Gold Medal of Military Valor
Silver Medal of Military Valor
Bronze Medal of Military Valor
Commemorative Medal for the Italo-Austrian War 1915–1918
Commemorative Medal of the Unity of Italy

Political offices
Preceded by Giovanni Giuriati	President of the Italian Chamber of Deputies; 1934–1939	Succeeded by Dino Grandi
Italian nobility
Preceded by New creation	Count of Cortellazzo and Buccari; 1925–1939	Succeeded by Galeazzo Ciano
