= Emilio Floris =

Italian politician (born 1944)

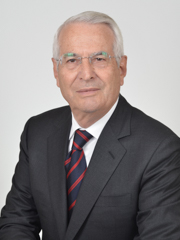

Mayor of Cagliari
- In office 16 May 2001 – 1 June 2011
- Preceded by: Mariano Delogu
- Succeeded by: Massimo Zedda

Member of the Italian Senate
- In office 15 March 2013 – 13 October 2022
- Constituency: Sardinia

Personal details
- Born: 15 September 1944 (age 82) Cagliari, Italy
- Party: DC (till 1994); Forza Italia (1994-2009); PdL (2009-2013); Forza Italia (since 2013)
- Education: University of Cagliari
- Occupation: Medic, politician

Emilio Floris (born 15 September 1944) is an Italian politician. A trained physician, he started his political career in the mid-1990s as a member of Forza Italia. In 2001, he was elected mayor of the Sardinian capital, Cagliari.

== Medical career ==
Emilio Floris specialized in radiology, cardiology and occupational medicine. After graduating, he worked temporarily for public hospitals in Cagliari and Guspini. Later, he became administrative leader of two privately owned hospitals in Cagliari and Oristano, in which he also performed medical work.

During this time, he was also engaged in public functions, becoming leader of the Italian Association of Private Hospitals 'AIOP' as well as president of the cultural society "La Radice" and of a local soccer club.

== Political career ==
In 1994, Emilio Floris was among the founding members of Forza Italia in Sardinia. He became chairman of the party's group in the regional council after receiving one of the best results of all candidates. Later during his term, he was also elected as provincial coordinator of his party. After confirming his electoral success in the 1999 elections, Floris retained his position as group leader in the council.

Two years later, he was elected mayor of his hometown, Cagliari, with the respectable result of 56.9% of all votes, giving him a simple majority already in the first round. He was reelected as mayor in the 2006 elections, with 53.6% in the vote.
