= Francesca Ghirra =

Italian politician (born 1978)

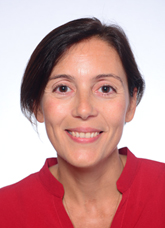
- Ghirra in 2022

Member of the Chamber of Deputies
- Incumbent
- Assumed office 13 October 2022
- Constituency: Sardinia – P01

Personal details
- Born: 25 July 1978 (age 47)
- Party: Progressive Party (since 2022)

Francesca Ghirra (born 25 July 1978) is an Italian politician serving as a member of the Chamber of Deputies since 2022. From 2016 to 2019, she was an assessor of Cagliari.
