= Federacciai =

- Formation: 1988
- Headquarters: Milan
- Location: Italy
- Chairman: Alessandro Banzato
- Website: Federacciai.it

Federacciai is an Italian Confindustria association and it is the representative entity of all iron and steel companies based in Italy. These companies are about 150. Federacciai primary goal is to promove Italian iron and steel companies to make them work better and to have better revenues in the international market.

The former president, Antonio Gozzi, who is also the president of the steel and raw materials company Duferco, was arrested on 17 March 2015 for suspicion bribery business in Congo tryin to achieve a contract for a casino, was released a few days later.
