= Reformist Democratic Party (Italy) =

Reformist Democratic Party Partito Riformista Democratico
- Founded: 1921
- Dissolved: 1924
- Ideology: Reformism; Social democracy
- Political position: Centre-left

The Reformist Democratic Party (Partito Democratico Riformista, PDR) was a reformist and social democratic political party in Italy.

It was formed for the 1921 general election where gained 1.8% of the vote and 11 seats in the Chamber of Deputies. It was disbanded after a few years in 1924.

== Electoral results ==
Chamber of Deputies
Election	Votes	%	Seats	+/–	Leader	Government
1921	122,087 (9th)	1.8	11 / 535	–	several	Opposition
