= Economic Party (South West Africa) =

"Economic Party" may also refer to the Reich Party of the German Middle Class, the Independent Economic Party (Kenya) or the Economic Party (Italy).

The Economic Party was a political party in South West Africa. It was initially formed on 27 August 1925 as the Omaruru Political Society by S. Proctor.
