= Dissident Left =

Dissident Left Sinistra dissidente
- Leaders: Giuseppe Zanardelli; Francesco Crispi; Benedetto Cairoli; Giovanni Nicotera; Alfredo Baccarini
- Founded: 1877; 148 years ago
- Dissolved: 1887; 138 years ago
- Split from: Historical Left
- Merged into: Historical Left
- Headquarters: Palazzo Montecitorio, Rome
- Ideology: Progressivism; Protectionism; Anti-Trasformismo
- Political position: Left-wing

The Dissident Left (Italian: Sinistra dissidente), commonly named The Pentarchy (Italian: La Pentarchia) for its five leaders, was a progressive and radical parliamentary group active in Italy during the last decades of the 19th century.

== History ==
It emerged in 1880 from the left-wing of the two dominant parliamentary groups, the Historical Left, in opposition to the trasformismo of Agostino Depretis. In the 1880 general election, the party won 19.7% of the vote and 119 seats in the Chamber of Deputies.

The Pentarchy was a group formed led by Francesco Crispi and composed also by Giuseppe Zanardelli, Benedetto Cairoli, Giovanni Nicotera, Agostino Magliani, Alfredo Beccarini and Gabriele D'Annunzio. Initially split from the Left in 1880, this group re-merged in to the Left in 1887.

== Ideology ==
The Dissident Left supported statist and progressive internal policies, expansionism and Germanophile foreign policies, as well as protectionist economy policies. Most of these policies were to be implemented by Francesco Crispi when he became Prime Minister in the 1890s.

== Electoral results ==
Chamber of Deputies
Election year	Votes	%	Seats	+/−	Leader
1880	70,479 (3rd)	19.7	119 / 508	–	Giuseppe Zanardelli
1882	45,282 (4th)	3.7	19 / 508	▼100	Giuseppe Zanardelli
1886	71,632 (4th)	5.1	26 / 508	▲7	Giuseppe Zanardelli
