= Umberto Puppini =

Italian engineer and politician

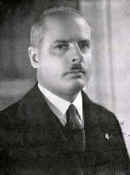

Minister of Communications
- In office 30 April 1934 – 24 January 1935
- Prime Minister: Benito Mussolini
- Preceded by: Costanzo Ciano
- Succeeded by: Antonio Stefano Benni

Mayor of Bologna
- In office 7 March 1923 – 25 December 1926
- Preceded by: Enio Gnudi
- Succeeded by: Leandro Arpinati (podestà)

Member of the Chamber of Deputies
- In office 20 April 1929 – 2 March 1939

Member of the Chamber of Fasces and Corporations
- In office 23 March 1939 – 5 August 1943

Personal details
- Born: 16 August 1884 Bologna, Kingdom of Italy
- Died: 21 May 1946 (aged 61) Bologna, Italy
- Party: National Fascist Party
- Education: University of Bologna
- Occupation: professor, engineer, politician
- Engineering career
- Discipline: Hydraulic engineering
- Institutions: University of Bologna

Umberto Puppini (16 August 1884, Bologna – 21 May 1946, Bologna) was a minister of the Italian government in the 1930s and a professor of hydraulic engineering.

Puppini grew up as an orphan in poverty, but thanks to financial support from the city of Bologna he was able to study engineering and received his laurea in 1908 from the University of Bologna. There he became in the school of hydraulic engineering an assistant in 1908 and a libero docente in 1912. During WW I he was an officer in the artillery corps. After the war, he returned to the University of Bologna and became in hydraulic engineering a professor extraordinarius in 1920 and a professor ordinarius in 1923. From 1927 to 1932 he was director of the school of engineering (Scuola di Applicazione). After the fascist rise to power he was elected as a pro-fascist mayor of Bologna, before the fascist law of 4 February 1926 replaced the elected office of mayor with a fascist-appointed office of mayor. Replacing Costanzo Ciano, he was Undersecretary at the Ministry of Agriculture from 20 June to 30 August 1943. He was then the Minister of Communications from 30 April 1934 to 23 January 1935. He was also president of Agip. During WW II he withdrew from politics and devoted himself to research. He died of a heart attack in 1949 on his way to give a lecture at the University of Bologna.

He is best known his hydraulics research, which was important in construction for drainage projects. He studied groundwater flow both theoretically and in electrical models and developed the method of "fluid inclusion volume" when calculating flood discharge by means of drainage ditches. In structural hydraulic engineering he studied the effects of heat on dams and high pressure pipes.

Puppini won the Prix Boileau [Prix Boileau de l'Académie des sciences (Boileau Prize of the French Academy of Sciences)] for the year 1915. He was an Invited Speaker of the ICM in 1924 at Toronto and a Plenary Speaker of the ICM in 1928 at Bologna.

== Selected publications ==
- I fondamenti scientifici dell'idraulica, 1912
- Idraulica, 1947 (published posthumously)
