= Julius Perathoner =

Austrian politician (1849–1926)

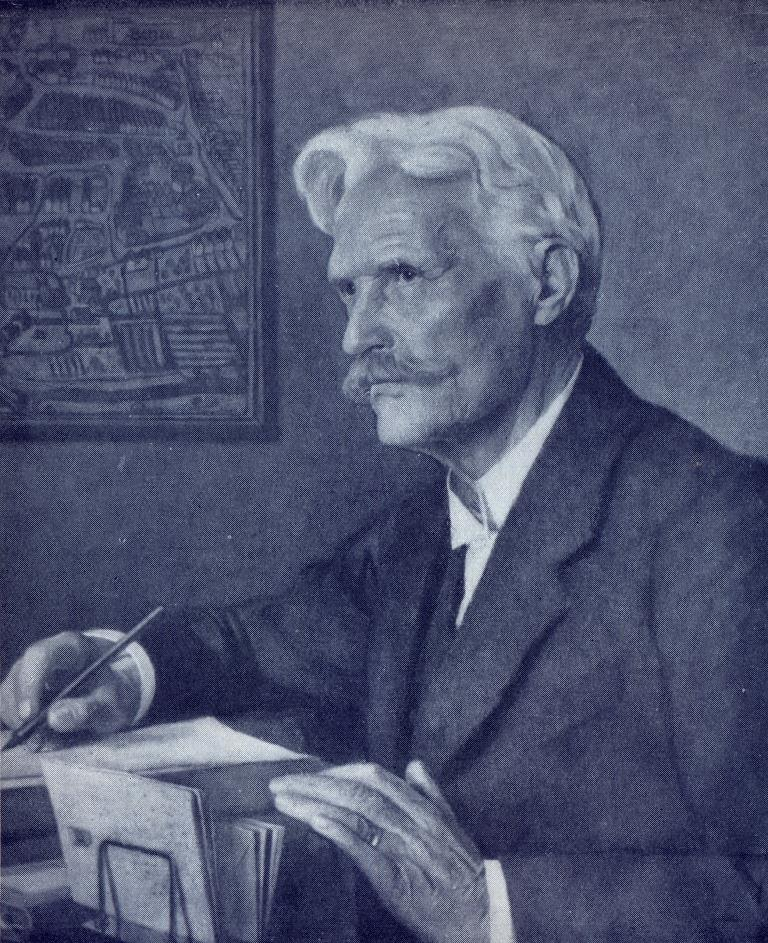
Julius Perathoner (1849–1926)

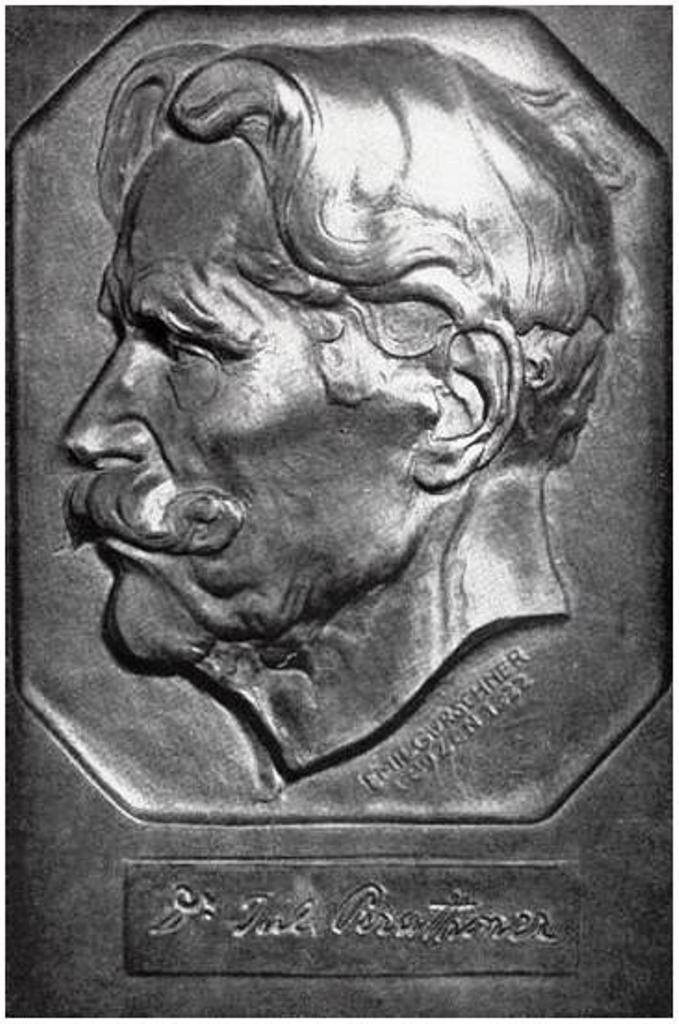
Former Bronze tablet in memory of Julius Perathoner at the entrance of the Bozner townhall - Emil Gurschner (1886–1938)

Julius Perathoner (Dietenheim (Bruneck), 28 February 1849 – Bolzano, 17 April 1926) was an Austro-Hungarian politician who became an Italian citizen after the Treaty of Saint-Germain. He was one of the most important exponents of the Liberal Party in Tyrol and the last mayor of German ethnicity of the City of Bolzano from 1895 to 1922. On 3 October 1922 the democratically elected Perathoner was forcibly deposed as mayor during the March on Bozen from Italian fascists and replaced by a fascist functionary.

== Political views ==
He was the last German-speaking mayor of the capital of the current South Tyrol. Despite his being a German Nationalist he was a staunch opponent of fascism. In addition to his being a mayor of Bolzano he also was a member of the Imperial Parliament in Vienna from 1901 to 1911 and at the Diet of Innsbruck from 1902 to 1907. The movement he was the head of was committed to a modernization of the country by the way of division the State from the Church, unlike the conservative party (the Tiroler Volkspartei, TVP) program, which was very strong in the countryside. Perathoner being one of the major adherer of the Tyrolean pangermanist movement joined the Volksbund, an organization which was founded in 1905, the extremist Wilhelm Rohmeder was among its members. Perathoner was also a supporter of the Germanization of the Ladins. He proposed to detach the Val di Fassa and the Ampezzano from the districts of the Italian Tyrol, namely the Trentino, and to join them instead to the German-speaking district of Bolzano.
