= Paolo Truzzu =

Italian politician (born 1972)

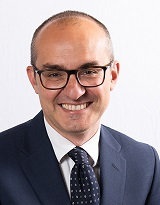

Mayor of Cagliari
- In office 18 July 2019 – 20 April 2024
- Preceded by: Massimo Zedda
- Succeeded by: Massimo Zedda

Member of the Regional Council of Sardinia
- In office 12 March 2014 – 17 July 2019

Personal details
- Born: 25 July 1972 (age 54) Cagliari, Italy
- Party: Brothers of Italy (2014–present)
- Education: University of Cagliari
- Occupation: Politician

Paolo Truzzu (born 25 July 1972) is an Italian politician. He was elected mayor of Cagliari on 17 June 2019.

In 2024, while the city is swamped with construction sites that congest traffic flows and whose completion is constantly postponed, Paolo Truzzu is one of Italy's most unpopular mayors.

He has a tattoo of 'Trux' on his arm, a cross between his surname and DUX, the nickname of 'Duce' Mussolini.
