= General Confederation of Italian Industry =

Italian employers' federation and national chamber of commerce

Confederazione generale dell'industria italiana
- Confindustria
- Formation: 5 May 1910; 116 years ago
- Headquarters: EUR, Rome
- Region served: Italy
- Members: 113,000 companies
- President: Emanuele Orsini
- Website: confindustria.it

The General Confederation of Italian Industry (Italian: Confederazione Generale dell'Industria Italiana), commonly known as Confindustria, is the Italian small, medium, and big enterprises federation, acting as a private and autonomous chamber of commerce, founded in 1910. The association network is made of 222 associations, bringing together more than 150,000 companies of all sizes on a voluntary basis, accounting for around 5,400,000 individuals. It aims to help Italy's economic growth, in doing so assisting its members. It is a member of the International Organisation of Employers (IOE). The president since 23 May 2024 is Emanuele Orsini.

Confindustria was a founding member of several organizations, including ISTUD (Istituto Studi Direzionali) and Assingegneria (an organization set up by Confindustria, which has since merged with OICE, which in itself belongs to Confindustria). Members of Confindustria include ANIMA, which is the Federation of the Italian Associations of Mechanical and Engineering Industries. It owns the prominent newspaper Il Sole 24 Ore. With local chapters all over Italy, it is popularly synonymous with Italian business.

== Branches ==
These are the main branches of the Confindustria Association:

- ACIMAC
- ACIMALL
- ACIMGA
- ACIMIT
- AFI
- AGENS
- AICC
- AIE
- AIOP
- AISCAT
- AITEC
- AMAPLAST
- ANAV
- ANCE
- ANCIT
- ANEF
- ANEPLA
- ANFAO
- ANFIA
- ANIASA
- ANICA
- ANIE
- ANIMA
- ANICAV
- ANINSEI
- ANIP
- ANITA
- ANITEC - ASSINFORM
- ANPAM
- APA
- APPLIA Italia
- ASSAEROPORTI
- ASSALZOO
- ASSICA
- ASSISTAL
- ASSITOL
- ASSOBIBE
- ASSOBIRRA
- ASSOCALZATURIFICI ITALIANI
- ASSOCARNI
- ASSOCARTA
- ASSOCIAZIONE ITALIANA CONFINDUSTRIA ALBERGHI
- ASSONCONSULT
- ASSOCONTROL
- ASSOFOND
- ASSOGAS
- ASSOGRAFICI
- ASSOLATTE
- ASSOLOGISTICA
- ASSOMAC
- ASSOMET
- ASSONAVE
- ASSOPELLETTIERI
- ASSORISORSE
- ASSOSISTEMA
- ASSOSOFTWARE
- ASSOTTICA - ASSOMEP
- ASSOVETRO
- Assowedding&Luxury
- ASSTEL
- CISAMBIENTE
- CONFINDUSTRIA ANCMA
- Confindustria ASSOIMMOBILIARE
- Confindustria Ceramica
- Confindustria Dispositivi Medici
- Confindustria Federorafi
- Confindustria Federvarie
- Confindustria Intellect
- Confindustria Marmomacchine
- Confindustria Nautica
- Confindustria Radio Televisioni
- Confindustria Servizi Innovativi e Tecnologici
- Confitarma
- Elettricità Futura
- Farmindustria
- Federazione Gomma Plastica
- Federacciai
- Federchimica
- Federcostruzioni
- Federlegno-Arredo
- Federmeccanica
- Federpesca
- Federterme
- Federunacoma
- Federvini
- GIMAV
- ITALMOPA
- MINERACQUA
- OICE
- PROXIGAS
- SMI - Sistema Moda Italia
- UCIMA
- UCIMU
- UNEM
- UNIC
- UNIONE ITALIANA FOOD

== Former presidents ==
- Luigi Bonnefon (1910–1913)
- Ferdinando Bocca (1913–1918)
- Dante Ferraris (1918–1919)
- Giovanni Battista Pirelli (1919)
- Giovanni Silvestri (1919–1920)
- Ettore Conti (1920–1921)
- Raimondo Targetti (1922–1923)
- Antonio Stefano Benni (1923–1934)
- Alberto Pirelli (1934)
- Giuseppe Volpi di Misurata (1934–1943)
- Giovanni Balella (1943)
- Giuseppe Mazzini (1943)
- Fabio Friggeri (1944–1945)
- Angelo Costa (1945–1955)
- Alighiero De Micheli (1955–1961)
- Furio Cicogna (1961–1966)
- Angelo Costa (1966–1970)
- Renato Lombardi (1970–1974)
- Gianni Agnelli (1974–1976)
- Guido Carli (1976–1980)
- Vittorio Merloni (1980–1984)
- Luigi Lucchini (1984–1988)
- Sergio Pininfarina (1988–1992)
- Luigi Abete (1992–1996)
- Giorgio Fossa (1996–2000)
- Antonio D'Amato (2000–2004)
- Luca Cordero di Montezemolo (2004–2008)
- Emma Marcegaglia (2008–2012)
- Giorgio Squinzi (2012–2016)
- Vincenzo Boccia (2016–2020)
- Carlo Bonomi (2020–2024)
- Emanuele Orsini (2024–present)

== See also ==
- Economy of Italy
- List of national employers' federations
