= National Bloc (Italy, 1921) =

Former Italian political party bloc

National Bloc Blocco Nazionale
- Leaders: Giovanni Giolitti; Benito Mussolini; Enrico Corradini
- Founded: 1921
- Dissolved: 1924
- Succeeded by: National List
- Ideology: Anti-socialism; Factions: Liberalism; Fascism; National conservatism Radicalism
- Political position: Right-wing; Factions: Centre to far-right

The National Bloc (Italian: Blocco Nazionale) was a right-wing anti-socialist coalition of political parties in Italy formed for the 1921 general election.

== History ==
The National Bloc incorporated the electoral list of the Liberal former Prime Minister Giovanni Giolitti, the Fasci Italiani di Combattimento led by Benito Mussolini, the Italian Nationalist Association led by Enrico Corradini, and other right-wing forces.

The list obtained 19.1% of votes and a total of 105 MPs, including 35 fascists (including Mussolini) and 20 MPs for the Italian Nationalist Association. Almost all of the MPs supported the Mussolini government, which took office 31 October 1922, after the March on Rome. In 1924, the National Bloc was succeeded by Mussolini’s National List.

== Composition ==
Party	Main ideology	Political position	Leader/s
Liberal Party	Classical liberalism	Centre-right	Giovanni Giolitti
Fasci Italiani di Combattimento	Fascism	Far-right	Benito Mussolini
Italian Nationalist Association	National conservatism	Far-right	Enrico Corradini
Social Democracy	Radicalism	Centre	Giovanni Antonio Colonna

== Electoral results ==
Chamber of Deputies
Election year	Votes	%	Seats	+/−	Leader
1921	1,260,007 (3rd)	19.1	105 / 535	–	Giovanni Giolitti
