= Simonetta Colonna di Cesarò =

Italian fashion designer (1922–2011)

Simonetta Colonna di Cesarò (1922-2011) was an Italian countess who became known as one of the most celebrated Italian fashion designers of her time and was described as the first lady of Italian fashion. She was a member of the Colonna family.

== Early life ==
Simonetta was born on April 10, 1922, in Rome, Italy. She was the daughter of Giovanni Antonio Colonna di Cesarò.

Her father, once a member of Mussolini's first government as Minister of Postal and Telegraph Services, became a target of the fascist regime after resigning in 1924 and publicly condemning fascism. This political stance profoundly influenced her family's life. When 20 years old on May 29, 1942, Simonetta was tried for attending a party with American diplomat Merrit Cootes, who was awaiting expulsion from Italy. She was sentenced to fifteen days in the Mantellate women's prison and subsequently to three years of confinement in Abruzzo. During this time, she moved to Sorrento, began amateur fashion design, and created dresses for the daughters of philosopher Benedetto Croce. Her sentence was eventually pardoned after intervention from the Vatican.

== Fashion career ==
Simonetta opened her first fashion house under the brand "Visbel" in 1946 at the family palace on Via Gregoriana in Rome, which remained its base until 1963. The name "Visbel" combined her maiden name and that of her then-partner Michela Belmonte. It was later changed to "Simonetta Visconti," and then simply to "Simonetta" following her divorce.

Her debut collection featured fourteen models, creatively using non-luxurious materials like dishcloths, linings, and trimmings, reflecting post-war Rome's material scarcity. The collection gained appreciation in both Italian and foreign fashion magazines. Her second collection, including eighteen models, presented richer designs and evening dresses, receiving coverage in high-fashion magazines.

In February 1951, Simonetta participated in Italy's first fashion show organized by Giovanni Battista Giorgini in Florence. This led to a contract with Bergdorf Goodman for a Spring 1951 women's collection, greatly increasing her visibility in the USA. Her Mediterranean-inspired collection for Bergdorf Goodman was a success, with one of her dresses being the first Italian design presented at the New York Fashion Group's biannual show.

In 1952, Simonetta received her first official professional recognition, the Diploma al Merito from the Confcommercio.

She signed contracts with other U.S. and Canadian retailers. In 1954, Marzotto Group selected Simonetta and Pucci to promote their fabrics, showcasing the "Anaconda Line" with softer lines, characteristic of her work in the late 1950s.

In 1953, Simonetta co-founded the SIAM - Sindacato Italiano Alta Moda which eventually became the Camera Nazionale della Moda Italiana, splitting with Giovanni Battista Giorgini and Italian High Fashion. They showcased their creations in Rome, days before the Florence shows at Palazzo Pitti.

In 1955, the Simonetta brand launched its Incanto perfume in America, later expanding to other cosmetics in Italy.

The "Rondò Line," featuring rounded forms popular at the time, was introduced in the 1957-1958 autumn-winter collection. This era blurred the lines between evening and cocktail dresses, and Simonetta's designs featured in luxury car advertisements in Vogue America.

In 1957, Simonetta and Alberto Fabiani presented their collections in London, invited by Marks & Spencer. This collaboration led to the "Boutique Collection," characterized by practical, accessible models, suitable for American mass production.

In 1962, Simonetta and her husband opened a Parisian atelier on rue François-Ier. The "Dauphin" collection marked its opening. The Via Gregoriana atelier closed in 1963. In 1964, Simonetta collaborated with Françoise Letessier, focusing on "Haute Boutique" ready-to-wear fashion, popular among celebrities like Elsa Schiaparelli and the Duchess of Windsor.

== Education and personal life ==
Raised by her mother, Simonetta was educated in the lifestyle and tastes of the aristocracy, learning multiple languages which later aided her in business. In 1943, she met Don Galeazzo Visconti di Modrone, marrying him in 1944 and having a daughter, Verde Emanuela Visconti di Modrone, in 1947. The marriage ended in divorce a few years later.

In 1952, Simonetta married tailor Alberto Fabiani, with whom she had a second child, Bardo, a future fashion photographer. After maintaining separate careers, they moved to Paris in 1962, collaborating in the fashion scene until their divorce in 1973. Later, Simonetta explored Eastern philosophies and yoga, following Indian guru Swami Chidananda to San Francisco. She traveled extensively in the East, staying in Ashrams and volunteering. Returning to the West in 1985 after the deaths of her sister Mita and Alberto Fabiani, she lived between Rome and Paris until her death in Rome in 2011.
