= 1880 Italian general election =

- 16 May 1880 (first round); 23 May 1880 (second round)

All 508 seats in the Chamber of Deputies 255 seats needed for a majority
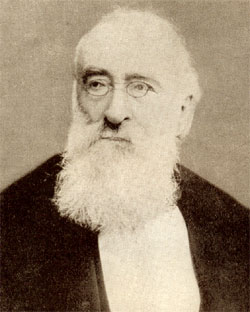

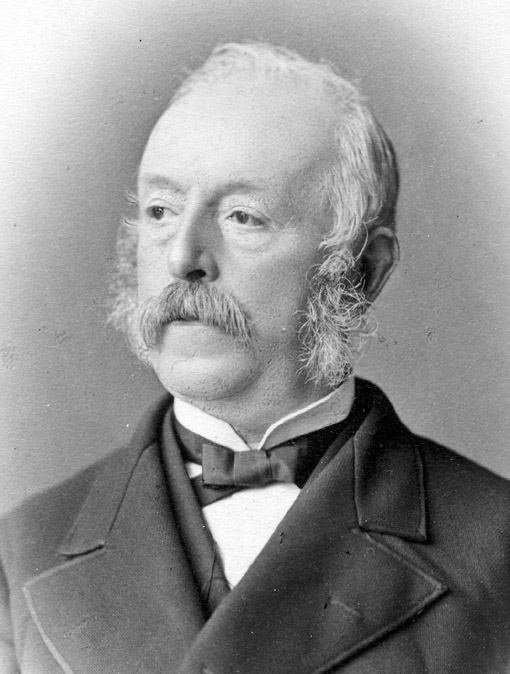

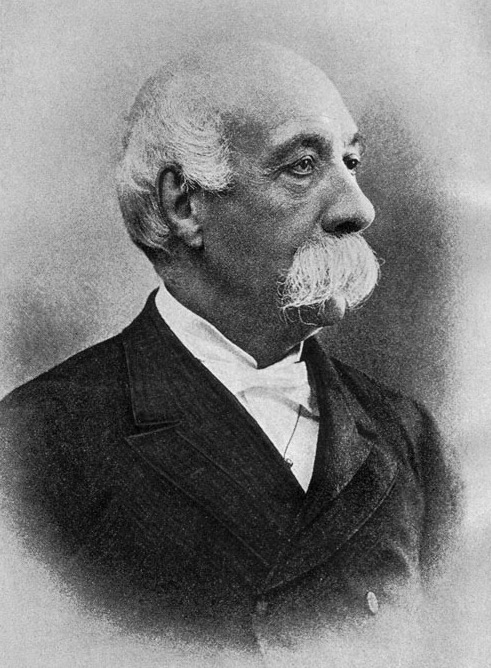
	Majority party	Minority party	Third party
Leader	Agostino Depretis	Marco Minghetti	Francesco Crispi
Party	Historical Left	Historical Right	Dissident Left
Seats won	218	171	119
Seat change	▼196	▲77	New
Popular vote	146,096	135,717	70,479
Percentage	40.76%	37.86%	19.66%
Swing	▼29.45 pp	▲9.66 pp	New
- Results by electoral college
Prime Minister before election
Benedetto Cairoli
Historical Left
Subsequent Prime Minister
Benedetto Cairoli
Historical Left

General elections were held in Italy on 16 May 1880, with a second round of voting on 23 May.

== Campaign ==
The Historical Left was led by the Prime Minister of Italy, Agostino Depretis, longtime Prime Minister of Italy.

The bloc of the Historical Right was led by Marco Minghetti, a conservative politician and former Prime Minister, from Bologna.

A third large parliamentary group was the Dissident Left, composed by former members of the Left, which were against the alliance with the Right. Also known as La Pentarchia (The Pentarchy), its main leader was Giuseppe Zanardelli, a jurisconsult from Brescia.

== Parties and leaders ==
Party	Ideology	Leader
Historical Left	Liberalism	Agostino Depretis
Historical Right	Conservatism	Marco Minghetti
Dissident Left	Progressivism	Francesco Crispi

== Results ==
The Historical Left group emerged as the largest in Parliament, although left-wing dissidents won 119 of the 508 seats, becoming the third parliamentary group. Only 621,896 men of a total population of around 29 million were entitled to vote. Benedetto Cairoli was confirmed Prime Minister by the king Umberto I.

Party	Votes	%	Seats	+/–
Historical Left	146,096	40.76	218	−196
Historical Right	135,717	37.86	171	+77
Dissident Left	70,479	19.66	119	New
Others	6,147	1.71	0	0
Total	358,439	100.00	508	0
Valid votes	358,439	96.96		
Invalid/blank votes	11,245	3.04		
Total votes	369,684	100.00		
Registered voters/turnout	621,896	59.44		
Source: National Institute of Statistics
