= National List (Italy) =

National List Lista Nazionale
- Leader: Benito Mussolini
- Founded: 1924
- Dissolved: 1926
- Preceded by: National Bloc
- Merged into: National Fascist Party
- Ideology: Italian fascism Italian nationalism National conservatism
- Political position: Far-right
- Colours: Black

The National List (Italian: Lista Nazionale) also known as Listone (literally "Big List") was a Fascist and nationalist coalition of political parties in Italy established for the 1924 general election, and led by Benito Mussolini, Prime Minister of Italy and leader of the National Fascist Party.

== History ==
=== Background ===
In the night between 27 and 28 October 1922, about 30,000 Fascist blackshirts gathered in Rome to demand the resignation of liberal Prime Minister Luigi Facta and the appointment of a new Fascist government with Benito Mussolini at its head. On the morning of 28 October, King Victor Emmanuel III, who according to the Albertine Statute held the supreme military power, refused the government request to declare martial law, which led to Facta's resignation. The King then handed over power to Mussolini (who stayed in his headquarters in Milan during the talks) by asking him to form a new government. The King's controversial decision has been explained by historians as a combination of delusions and fears; Mussolini enjoyed wide support in the military and among the industrial and agrarian elites, while the King and the conservative establishment were afraid of a possible civil war and ultimately thought they could use Mussolini to restore law and order in the country, but failed to foresee the danger of a totalitarian evolution.

As Prime Minister, the first years of Mussolini's rule were characterized by a right-wing coalition government composed of the National Fascist Party, the Italian Nationalist Association, the Italian Liberal Party and two Catholic clerics from the Italian People's Party. The Fascists made up a small minority in his original governments. Mussolini's domestic goal was the eventual establishment of a totalitarian state with himself as supreme leader (Il Duce), a message that was articulated by the Fascist newspaper Il Popolo d'Italia, which was now edited by Mussolini's brother, Arnaldo. To that end, Mussolini obtained from the legislature dictatorial powers for one year (legal under the Italian constitution of the time). He favored the complete restoration of state authority, with the integration of the Italian Fasces of Combat into the armed forces (the foundation in January 1923 of the Voluntary Militia for National Security) and the progressive identification of the party with the state. In political and social economy, he passed legislation that favored the wealthy industrial and agrarian classes (privatizations, liberalizations of rent laws and dismantlement of the unions).

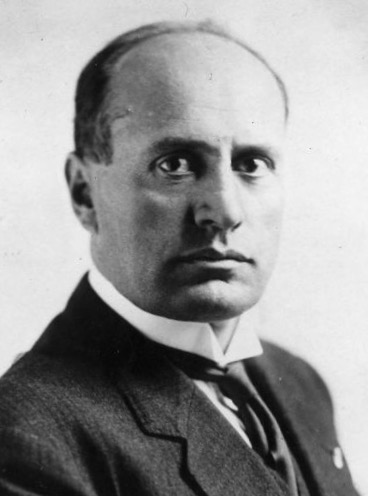
Mussolini in the early 1920s

In June 1923, the government passed the Acerbo Law, which transformed Italy into a single national constituency. It also granted a two-thirds majority of the seats in Parliament to the party or group of parties that received at least 25% of the votes. This law applied in the elections of 6 April 1924. The national alliance, consisting of Fascists, most of the old Liberals and others, won 64% of the vote.

=== 1924 election ===
Mussolini called for new election in April 1924. His Fascist Party formed a list, composed mainly by fascist members but also by some liberals like former Prime Ministers Vittorio Emanuele Orlando and Antonio Salandra, by politicians from the Italian Nationalist Association (ANI) like its leader Enrico Corradini, some Christian democrats expelled from the Italian People's Party and other right-wing forces.

In the 1924 general election, the National List became the first party in the country with 65.7% of votes and 374 seats in the Chamber of Deputies. The List was however disbanded in 1926 when Mussolini's government banned all the non-fascist parties, above all his former allies Liberals and the Nationalists. Most of the members of the National List subsequently became members of the National Fascist Party or left politics.

== Electoral results ==
Chamber of Deputies
Election year	Votes	%	Seats	+/−	Leader
1924	4,653,488 (1st)	65.7	375 / 535	–	Benito Mussolini

== Symbols ==
Logo of National List

Logo of National List bis

== See also ==
- Fasci Italiani di Combattimento
