= Tito Oro Nobili =

Italian politician

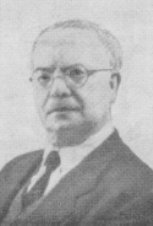

Personal details
- Born: 23 March 1882 Perugia, Italy
- Died: 8 February 1967 (aged 84) Rome, Italy
- Party: Socialist Party
- Occupation: Politician

Tito Oro Nobili (23 March 1882, Perugia – 8 February 1967, Rome) was an Italian politician. He was one of the founders and main leaders of the Italian Socialist Party.
