= Pitti Immagine =

Fashion industry events in Italy

Pitti Immagine is a collection of fashion industry events in Italy.

== Pitti Uomo ==
Pitti Uomo (English: "Pitti Man"), is one of the world's most important platforms for men's clothing and accessory collections, and for launching new projects in men's fashion. It is named after its original venue, the Palazzo Pitti in Florence, and is now held twice yearly at the Fortezza da Basso in Florence.

The first edition of Pitti Uomo was held in Florence in September 1972 and was organized by Giovanni Battista Giorgini with Simonetta Colonna di Cesarò's participation. It started out being called the “First Italian High Fashion Show” and was set in Giorgini's Villa Torrigiani. The exhibition provided a platform for raising the profile of Italian designers and now has achieved international stature as a leading fashion fair. Pitti Uomo is credited with making dandyism acceptable to a wider audience. The 88th edition of Pitti Uomo (Pitti 88) in June 2015 hosted 30,000 visitors in total. The Pitti Immagine Uomo 2015 Award went to Lardini, and the Pitti Immagine Career Award was awarded to Nino Cerruti. Pitti Immagine Uomo 89 was held 12–15 January 2016 with 1,219 exhibitors. Pitti Uomo 90 was held in Florence 14–17 June 2016. Brands showed their Fall/Winter 2017 men's collections at Pitti Uomo 91 on 10–13 January 2017. Pitti Uomo 92 in June 2017 hosted 30,000 visitors and 1,220 brands in an exhibition area of 60,000 sq. meters. Carlo Rivetti, owner of the brand Stone Island, has been an adviser of Pitti Immagine. Pitti Uomo 107 was held January 14–17, 2025. Italian buyers totaled approximately 8,300 people, while 5,000 international buyers attended. Pitti Uomo 108 in June 2025 hosted over 730 brands. The 109th edition of Pitti Uomo was held in January 2026, showing the FW26/27 collections of each brand. Foreign buyer attendance was approximately 5,000 people, which was the best turnout since the COVID-19 pandemic.

== Pitti Immagine Bimbo ==
Pitti Immagine Bimbo: fashion collections from 0–14 years ("bimbo" is Italian for "baby"). Among the most long-lived of Pitti Immagine fairs, with more than 70 editions. In Florence, at the Fortezza da Basso twice a year. Private sector operators.

== Pitti Immagine Filati ==
Pitti Immagine Filati: knitting yarn collections ("filati" is Italian for "yarns"). In Florence, at the Fortezza da Basso, two editions per year. Private sector operators.

== Taste ==
Taste showcases products related to culture and food research. It's held at the Stazione Leopolda in Florence, once per year. Open only to professionals; at certain times is also open to the public.

== Moda Prima ==
Fashion collections for men, women and children for the large retail chains. In Milan, twice a year. Private sector operators.

== Fragranze ==
Collections of artistic perfumes and essential oils for the body and for the home. Held at the Stazione Leopolda in Florence once a year. Private sector operators; at certain times also open to the public.

== Super ==
Women's ready-to-wear and accessories collections, held in Milan twice per year. Private sector operators. During the three days of SUPER 8 in September 2016, more than 5,100 buyers from nearly 50 countries saw collections presented by 142 brands. SUPER 9 was held 25–27 February 2017 at Porta Nuova Varesine, Piazza Lina Bo Bardi, Milano.

== See also ==
- Culture of Italy
