= Progressive Party (Sardinia) =

Progressive Party Partito Progressista
- President: Massimo Zedda
- Founded: 3 March 2017; 9 years ago
- Headquarters: Piazza Galileo Galilei 13, Cagliari
- Ideology: Progressivism
- Political position: Left-wing
- National affiliation: CP (2017); AVS (2022–2026); PD (2026-)
- Colours
- Chamber of Deputies: 1 / 400
- Senate: 0 / 205
- European Parliament: 0 / 76
- Regional Council of Sardinia: 2 / 60

Website
- partitoprogressista.it

The Progressive Party (Italian: Partito Progressista, PP) is a progressive political party active in Sardinia, led by Massimo Zedda, mayor of Cagliari.

== History ==
The party was founded on 3 March 2017 as the Sardinian branch of Progressive Camp, a political party led nationally by Giuliano Pisapia. The main founders of the Sardinian Progressive Camp were Roberto Capelli (a deputy elected with the Democratic Centre) and Luciano Uras (a senator affiliated with Italian Left). When Pisapia's political party disbanded at the end of 2017, the Sardinian section of Progressive Camp maintained its autonomy and continued to exist. Uras was appointed president of the regional party.

For the 2019 regional election the centre-left coalition nominated Massimo Zedda, a member of Progressive Camp, as a candidate for president. Eventually, Zedda lost to centre-right challenger Christian Solinas, while Progressive Camp got 3.2% of the vote and two seats.

On 22 November 2019, Uras and Giuseppe Verona resigned as party president and treasurer respectively. The party subsequently changed its name to Sardinian Progressives (Italian: Progressisti Sardi) and its leadership was taken over by Zedda.

In December 2021, the adhesion campaign to the constituent phase of the Progressive Party (Italian: Partito Progressista) was launched, and a meeting of the regional promoting committee, convened and coordinated by Zedda, took place.

In the 2022 general election, thanks to an electoral pact with the Greens and Left Alliance, PP's Francesca Ghirra was elected to the Chamber of Deputies.

In the 2024 regional election, the party obatained 3.0% of the vote and three regional councillors.

== Election results ==
=== Italian Parliament ===
Election	Leader	Chamber of Deputies					Senate of the Republic					Government
Election	Leader	Votes	%	Seats	+/–	Position	Votes	%	Seats	+/–	Position	Government
2022	Massimo Zedda	Into AVS		1 / 400	New	7th	Into AVS		0 / 200	New	7th	Opposition (2022–present)

=== Regional elections ===
Election	Votes	%	Seats	+/–
2019	22,671	3.2	3 / 60	New
2024	20,868	3.0	3 / 60	0

== Leadership ==
- President: Luciano Uras (2017–2019), Massimo Zedda (2019–present)
