= Social Democracy (Italy, 1922) =

Political party in Italy between 1922 and 1926

Social Democracy Democrazia Sociale
- Leader: Giovanni Antonio Colonna
- Founded: 1921 (as a coalition); 26 April 1922 (as a party)
- Banned: 6 November 1926
- Preceded by: Democratic Party
- Succeeded by: Labour Democratic Party (not legal successor)
- Ideology: Radicalism; Social liberalism Social conservatism
- Political position: Centre to centre-left

The Social Democracy party (Italian: Democrazia Sociale, DS), also known as Italian Social Democratic Party (Italian: Partito Democratico Sociale Italiano), was a radical and social-liberal political party in Italy.

== History ==
In 1921 general election the alliance referred to as the Social Democratic Party won 4.7% of the vote and 29 seats.

In January 1922 the "National Council of Social Democracy and Radicalism" was officially created; this event is considered the date of the party's official formation and name, and of the dissolution of the Italian Radical Party. The main party's founders were Giovanni Antonio Colonna di Cesarò, Arturo Labriola and Ettore Sacchi.

After the March on Rome, the party took part to the governments of Benito Mussolini until July 1924. It gained only 1.6% of votes in the general election of the same year and Antonio Colonna di Cesarò took part to the Aventine Secession. The party was disbanded by the regime in 1926, as all the other parties.

After World War II some of its members joined the Labour Democratic Party, a centre-left party.

== Electoral results ==
Chamber of Deputies
Election year	Votes	%	Seats	+/−	Leader
1921	309,191 (6th)	4.7	29 / 535	▼31	Giovanni Antonio Colonna
1924	111,035 (10th)	1.6	10 / 535	▼19	Giovanni Antonio Colonna
