= Massimo Zedda =

Italian politician

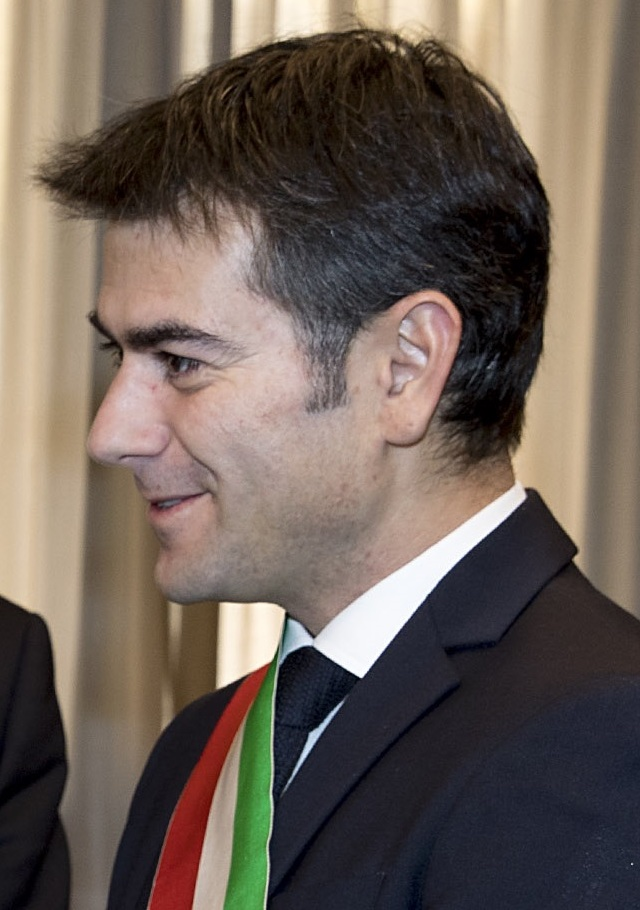

Mayor of Cagliari
- Incumbent
- Assumed office 17 June 2024
- Preceded by: Paolo Truzzu
- In office 1 June 2011 – 5 April 2019
- Preceded by: Emilio Floris
- Succeeded by: Paolo Truzzu

Personal details
- Born: 6 January 1976 (age 50) Cagliari, Italy
- Party: Progressive Party (since 2017)
- Other political affiliations: PDS (till 1998); DS (1998–2007); SEL (2009–2017)
- Occupation: Politician

Massimo Zedda (born 6 January 1976) is an Italian politician, Mayor of Cagliari from 2011 to 2019 and again since 2024.

== Biography ==
Son of a Sardinian leader of the Italian Communist Party, Zedda joined Nichi Vendola's Left Ecology Freedom in 2009.

In 2011, Zedda became the centre-left candidate for the office of Mayor of Cagliari at the 2011 local elections, supported by his party, the Democratic Party, Italy of Values and the Federation of the Left; he manages to be elected at the second round.

In 2016, Zedda runs once again for Mayor at the local elections supported by the whole centre-left coalition and is re-elected at the first round. In 2017, Zedda supported Giuliano Pisapia's Progressive Camp project and later joined the left-wing party Progressive Area.

In 2018, Zedda decided to run for the office of President of Sardinia at the 2019 regional election, guiding a centre-left coalition named Sardinian Progressives.
