= Dino Perrone Compagni =

Marquis Dino Perrone Compagni (22 October 1879 in Florence – 5 January 1950 in Florence) was a leading figure in the early years of Italian fascism.

== Life ==
Perrone Compagni joined the Italian Army at an early age and was a career soldier. However after reaching the rank of lieutenant he was demoted to private during the First World War for incompetence. His first political activity was in the Association Italia e Vittorio Emanuele, a minor liberal group before in November 1920 he switched to the fascists, becoming political secretary in Florence. Given his noble background Perrone Compagni came to represent the conservative wing of fascism that looked out for the interests of landowners and magnates in opposition to the more proletarian wing that followed the rough and ready leadership of the likes of Tullio Tamburini.

Perrone Compagni became an important figure as Italy stood on the brink of takeover by Benito Mussolini when he was appointed one of the four commandants-general of the fascist squads. His importance was emphasised in the March on Rome when he commanded the Tuscan contingent of the fascist squadrons. Under Mussolini's government, Perrone Compagni enjoyed wide power, particularly in Tuscany where he was effective head of the fascist machine. Such was his power in the region that he was given the nickname of 'Grand Duke' in Tuscany. His high profile made him a target for anti-fascists, however, and he was wounded in an ambush in Perugia not long after the takeover.

He would go on to serve as prefetto of Reggio Emilia from December 1926 to January 1930 before being appointed a Minister of State in 1932. In April 1934 he was appointed to the Italian Senate and in 1938 he secured the expulsion of his rival Carlo Scorza from that body. This was to be his last action of note as he disappeared into obscurity during the Second World War and took no role in post-war politics.
