= Mariano Delogu =

Italian politician (1933–2016)

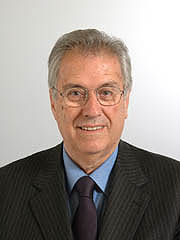

Mayor of Cagliari
- In office 28 June 1994 – 21 March 2001
- Preceded by: Gaetano Giua Marassi
- Succeeded by: Emilio Floris

Member of the Italian Senate
- In office 30 May 2001 – 15 March 2013

Personal details
- Born: 28 September 1933 Borore, Italy
- Died: 27 July 2016 (aged 82) Cagliari, Italy
- Party: AN (1995-2009); PdL (2009-2012); FdI (2012-2016)
- Education: University of Cagliari
- Occupation: Lawyer, politician

Mariano Delogu (28 September 1933 – 27 July 2016) was an Italian politician: mayor of Cagliari from 1994 to 2001 and senator from 2001 to 2013.

== Biography ==
Graduated in Law at the University of Cagliari and specialized as a lawyer, Delogu has been president of the Cagliari Calcio football club from 1976 to 1981 and has been a member of the Italian Football Federation council.

In 1994, Delogu joined Gianfranco Fini's National Alliance and became the Pole of Good Government official candidate for the office of Mayor of Cagliari, and was elected. He was re-elected mayor in 1998.

Delogu left his mayoral seat in 2001, once he was elected Senator for the House of Freedoms and held the seat for three consecutive legislatures till 2013.

From 2009 to 2011, Delogu has been the regional coordinator in Sardinia for The People of Freedom, though he later left the party and joined Giorgia Meloni's far-right party Brothers of Italy.

Delogu died on 27 July 2016 in Cagliari, at the age of 82.
