= Economic Party (Italy) =

Economic Party Partito Economico
- Leader: Ferdinando Bocca
- Founded: 1919
- Dissolved: 1924
- Headquarters: Turin, Italy
- Ideology: Liberism; Social conservatism
- Political position: Right-wing

The Economic Party (Partito Economico, PE) was an Italian political party founded in 1919 in Turin by a group of dealers and industrialists worried by the Red Biennium. The group viewed politics as subject to economic science, and was socially conservative.

The PE had its strongest constituencies in the larger cities of Northern Italy, as well as in Sicily, reaping benefits from its alliance with the Agrarian Party. In the 1919 general election, it received 1,5% of the vote and 7 seats. This support declined rapidly: in the 1921 election, the PE took 0,8% of the vote and 5 seats. It subsequently merged into the Agrarian Party.

== Electoral results ==
Chamber of Deputies
| Election year | Votes | % | Seats | +/− | Leader |
| 1919 | 87.450 (8th) | 1.5 | 7 / 508 | – | Ferdinando Bocca |
| 1921 | 53,382 (12th) | 0.8 | 5 / 535 | ▼2 | Ferdinando Bocca |
