= Tiroler Volkspartei =

Tyrol branch of the Austrian People's Party

Tyrolean People's Party Tiroler Volkspartei
- Abbreviation: TVP or ÖVP
- Chairman: Anton Mattle
- Landeshauptmann: Anton Mattle
- Parliamentary leader: Jakob Wolf
- Founded: 27 October 1918; 107 years ago
- Merger of: Christian Social Party; Catholic Conservatives
- Ideology: Christian democracy Conservatism; Liberal conservatism Catholic social teaching
- Political position: Centre-right
- National affiliation: Christian Social Party (before 1934); Austrian People's Party (from 1945)
- Colours: Black
- National Council: 5 / 11
- Federal Council: 3 / 5
- State governments: 17 / 36

Website
- www.tiroler-vp.at

The Tiroler Volkspartei (English: Tyrolean People's Party) is the Tirol branch of the Austrian People's Party.

The party was formed through a merger of the rival Christian Social Party and the Catholic Conservatives on 27 October 1918. After winning the first provincial legislative election in 1919, the Tiroler Volkspartei remained the most powerful party until the end of the First Austrian Republic. Within the party, the Tiroler Bauernbund (Farmers league) formed the largest and most influential group.

In the area of South Tyrol, which had been annexed to Italy, the Tiroler Volkspartei joined in a coalition with the Deutschfreiheitliche Partei called the Deutscher Verband. This coalition won 90% of the vote and sent four representatives to the Chamber of Deputies. However, the party lost its influence after the March on Rome in October 1922.

After 1945, the Tiroler Volkspartei became the state organization of the Austrian People's Party. It has remained the majority party in the provincial Landtag ever since, except for the years 1999 to 2025.
