= Giovanni Antonio Colonna di Cesarò =

Italian nobleman and politician (1878–1940)

Don Giovanni Antonio Colonna di Cesarò
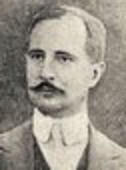

Minister of Post and Telegraphs
- In office 28 October 1922 – 5 February 1924
- Prime Minister: Benito Mussolini
- Preceded by: Luigi Fulci
- Succeeded by: Costanzo Ciano
- In office 26 February 1922 – 2 March 1922
- Prime Minister: Luigi Facta
- Preceded by: Vincenzo Giuffrida
- Succeeded by: Luigi Fulci

Member of the Chamber of Deputies
- In office 24 March 1909 – 9 November 1926
- Constituency: Francavilla di Sicilia (1909–1919); Messina (1919–1921); Catania (1921–1926)

Personal details
- Born: Giovanni Antonio Francesco Giorgio Landolfo Colonna Romano; 22 January 1878 Rome, Kingdom of Italy
- Died: 7 November 1940 (aged 62) Rome, Kingdom of Italy
- Party: Social Democracy
- Spouse: Barbara Antonelli
- Children: Simonetta Colonna di Cesarò

Don Giovanni Antonio Colonna Romano, Duke of Cesarò and of Reitano (22 January 1878 – 7 November 1940) was an Italian noble and politician who was the leader of the Social Democracy. He also served as the minister of post and telegraphs between 1922 and 1924 in the Mussolini Cabinet. He was known as the "anthroposophist duke".

== Biography ==
Colonna was born in 1878. From 1907, he started his political career and became a member of the parliament in the period 1909–1921. He founded and published a magazine entitled Rassegna contemporanea which is among the early anthroposophical publications. As of 1914, he was a member of the Italian National Olympic Committee.

Following the general elections on 15 May 1921 Colonna was named as the minister of post and telegraphs in the cabinet led by Giovanni Giolitti. He was appointed minister of posts to the cabinet headed by Luigi Facta on 25 February 1922, but he resigned from office soon being succeeded by Luigi Fulci in the post. In 1922, Colonna established the Social Democracy party and joined the government of Benito Mussolini as the minister of post and telegraphs, which he held until his resignation in February 1924. He was replaced by Costanzo Ciano in the post. Following this incident, Colonna retired from politics. His another magazine was Lo Stato Democratico (Italian: The Democratic State) which also published anthroposophical articles.

Close to the environments of esotericism and Roman neopaganism of those years, Colonna was part of the UR Group which was established in 1927 (perhaps with the pseudonym of "Arvo", or with those of "Krur" and "Breno").

He died in 1940.

== Views ==
Colonna was an advocate of colonialism and democratic imperialism. During World War I he supported the intervention of the Italian Empire through his writings in Rassegna contemporanea which also reflected his radical national views. However, Colonna did not have a consistent political ideology. Instead, he adopted different political views depending on the conditions. Following his retirement from politics Colonna became an anti-Fascist.

== Family and titles ==
He belonged to the Romano branch of the Colonna family and held several noble titles: 7th Duke of Cesarò, 10th Duke of Reitano, 7th Marquess of Fiumedinisi, Count of S. Alessio, Baron of Jancascio and Realturco, and Lord of Joppolo.

Colonna was married to Barbara Antonelli, a noblewoman of Russian origins, and their daughters were Mita and Simonetta Colonna di Cesarò.
