= 1921 Italian general election =

- 15 May 1921

All 535 seats in the Chamber of Deputies 268 seats needed for a majority
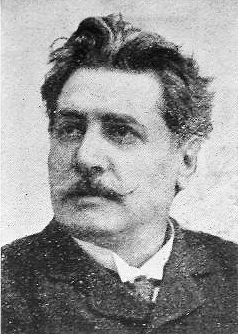

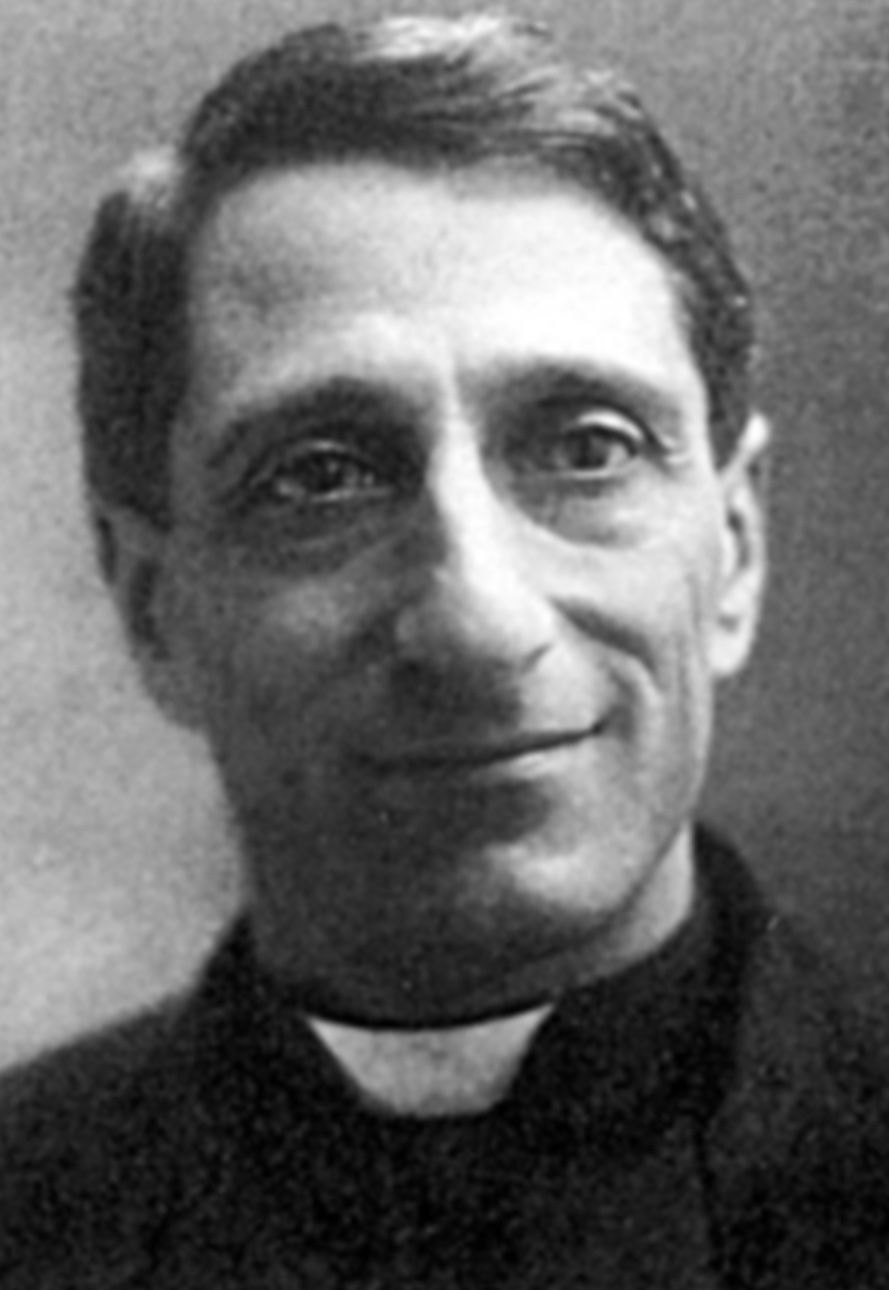

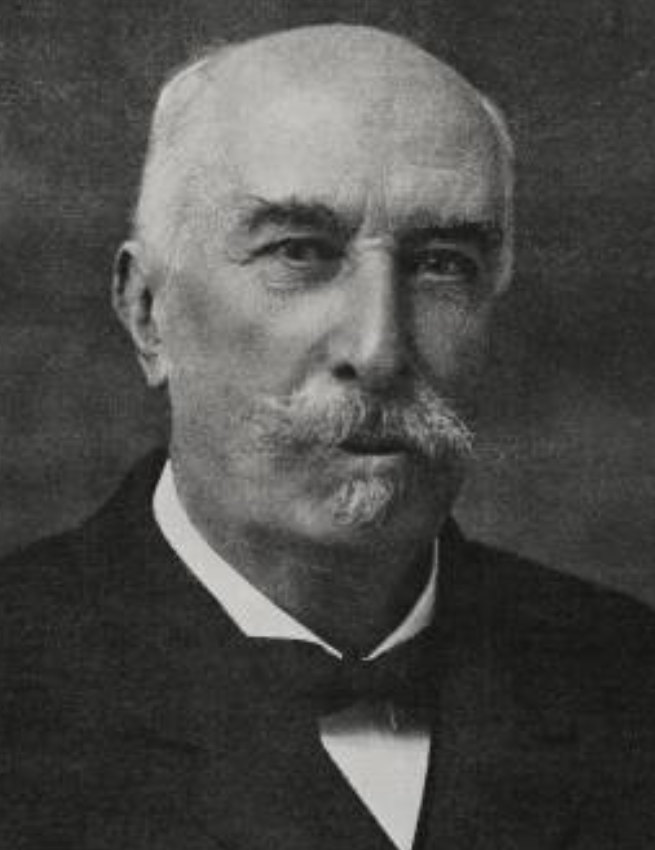

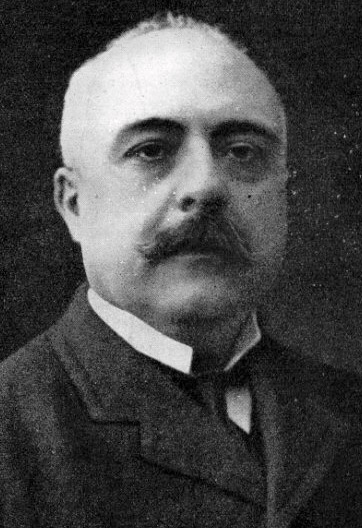

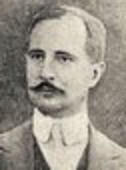
	Majority party	Minority party	Third party
Leader	Giovanni Bacci	Luigi Sturzo	Giovanni Giolitti
Party	PSI	PPI	BN
Seats won	123	108	105
Seat change	▼33	▲8	New
Popular vote	1,631,435	1,347,305	1,260,007
Percentage	24.69%	20.39%	19.07%
Swing	▼7.59pp	▼0.14pp	New
	Fourth party	Fifth party	Sixth party
Leader	Antonio Salandra	No leader	Giovanni Antonio Colonna
Party	PLDI	PL	DS
Seats won	105	43	29
Seat change	▼28	▲2	New
Popular vote	684,855	470,605	309,191
Percentage	10.36%	7.12%	4.68%
Swing	▼5.55pp	▼1.51pp	New
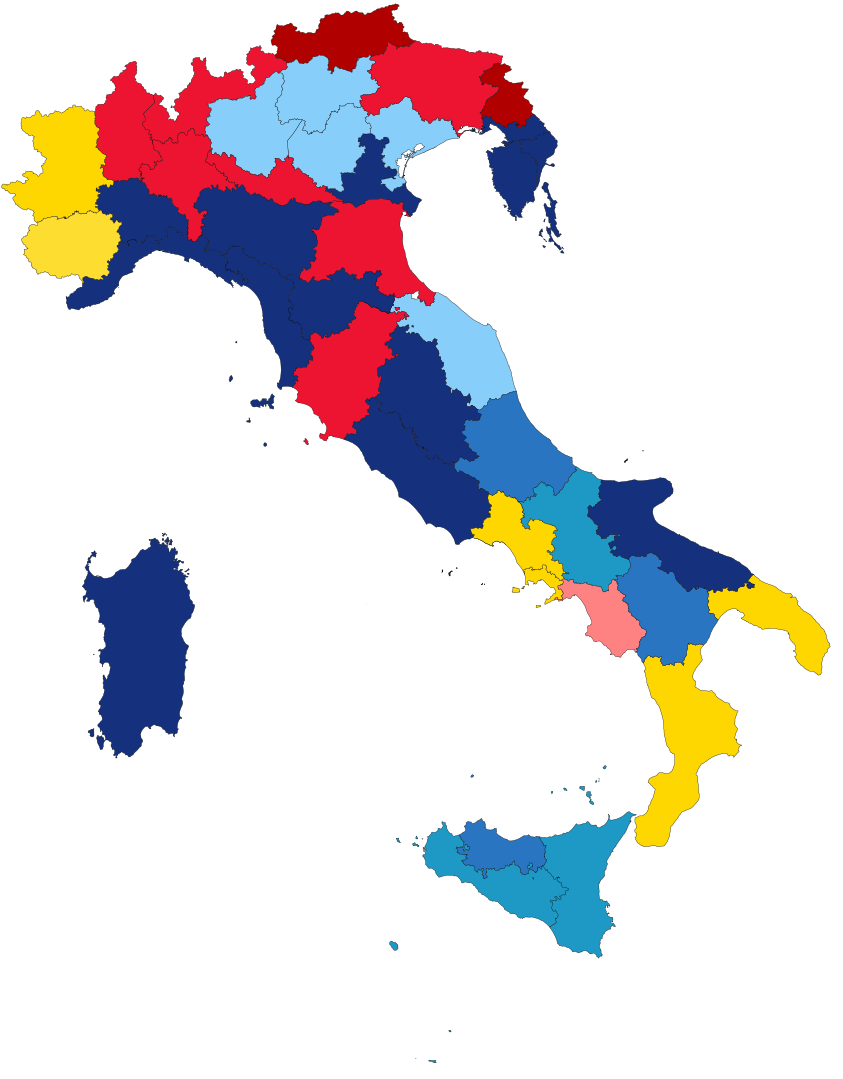
- PSI PPI BN PLD; PLI DS PDR SeT
Prime Minister before election
Giovanni Giolitti
PLI
Elected Prime Minister
Ivanoe Bonomi
PSRI

General elections were held in Italy on 15 May 1921. It was the first election in which the recently acquired regions of Trentino-Alto Adige, Venezia Giulia, Zara and Lagosta island elected deputies, many of whom were from the Germanic and South Slavic ethnic groups.

The 1921 election was the last free election before Benito Mussolini's fascist coup d'état.

== Background ==
From 1919 to 1920, Italy was shocked by a period of intense social conflict following the First World War known as the Biennio Rosso (Red Biennium). The revolutionary period was followed by the violent reaction of the Fascist Blackshirt militia and eventually by the March on Rome of Benito Mussolini in 1922.

The Biennio Rosso took place in a context of economic crisis at the end of the war, with high unemployment and political instability. It was characterized by mass strikes, worker manifestations as well as self-management experiments through land and factories occupations. In Turin and Milan, workers councils were formed and many factory occupations took place under the leadership of anarcho-syndicalists. The agitations also extended to the agricultural areas of the Po Valley and were accompanied by peasant strikes, rural unrests and guerrilla conflicts between left-wing and right-wing militias.

In the general election of 1921, the Liberal governing coalition, strengthened by the joining of Fascist candidates in the National Bloc (33 of whom were elected deputies), obtained a majority. The Italian Socialist Party, weakened by the split into the Communist Party of Italy, lost many votes and seats, while the Italian People's Party was steady around 20%. The Socialists were stronger in Lombardy (41.9%), than in their historical strongholds of Piedmont (28.6%), Emilia-Romagna (33.4%) and Tuscany (31.0%), due to the presence of the Communists (11.9, 5.2 and 10.5%), while the Populars were confirmed the largest party of Veneto (36.5%) and the Liberal parties in most Southern regions.

== Parties and leaders ==
Party	Ideology	Leader	Seats in 1919
Italian Socialist Party (PSI)	Socialism	Giovanni Bacci	156
Italian People's Party (PPI)	Christian democracy	Luigi Sturzo	100
Italian Democratic Liberal Party (PLDI)	Liberalism	Antonio Salandra	96
Liberal Party (PL)	Liberalism	No leader	41
Combatants' Party (PdC)	Veteran interests	No leader	20
Italian Republican Party (PRI)	Republicanism	Eugenio Chiesa	4
National Bloc (BN)	Conservatism	Giovanni Giolitti	Did not exist
Social Democracy (DS)	Social liberalism	Giovanni Antonio Colonna	Did not exist
Communist Party of Italy (PCdI)	Communism	Amadeo Bordiga	Did not exist
Reformist Democratic Party (PDR)	Social liberalism	No leader	Did not exist

== Results ==
Party	Votes	%	Seats	+/–
Italian Socialist Party	1,631,435	24.69	123	−33
Italian People's Party	1,347,305	20.39	108	+8
National Bloc (Note: Seats distribution: PL: 58 seats FIC: 35 seats ANI: 12 seats)	1,260,007	19.07	105	New
Italian Democratic Liberal Party	684,855	10.36	68	−28
Liberal Party	470,605	7.12	43	+2
Social Democracy	309,191	4.68	29	New
Communist Party of Italy	304,719	4.61	15	New
Italian Republican Party	124,924	1.89	6	−3
Reformist Democratic Party	122,087	1.85	11	New
Combatants' Party	113,839	1.72	10	−10
Lists of Slavs and Germans	88,648	1.34	9	New
Economic Party	53,382	0.81	5	−2
Independent Socialists	37,892	0.57	1	±0
Dissident Populars	29,703	0.45	0	New
Fasci Italiani di Combattimento	29,549	0.45	2	New
Total	6,608,141	100.00	535	+27
Valid votes	6,608,141	98.61		
Invalid/blank votes	93,355	1.39		
Total votes	6,701,496	100.00		
Registered voters/turnout	11,477,210	58.39		
Source: National Institute of Statistics

Popular vote
PSI	24.69%
PPI	20.39%
BN	19.07%
PLDI	10.36%
PL	7.12%
DS	4.68%
PCdI	4.61%
PRI	1.89%
PDR	1.82%
PdC	1.72%
SeT	1.34%
PE	0.81%
SI	0.57%
PD	0.45%
FIC	0.45%

Seats
PSI	22.99%
PPI	20.19%
BN	19.63%
PLDI	12.71%
PL	8.04%
DS	5.42%
PCdI	2.80%
PDR	2.06%
PdC	1.87%
SeT	1.68%
PRI	1.12%
PE	0.93%
FIC	0.37%
SI	0.18%

== Results by Region ==
Region	First party	Second party	Third party
Abruzzo-Molise	BN	PLDI	PSI
Apulia	BN	PSI	PPI
Basilicata	BN	PLDI	PPI
Calabria	BN	PLDI	SD
Campania	PLDI	BN	PSI
Emilia-Romagna	PSI	BN	PPI
Lazio	PPI	BN	PSI
Liguria	PSI	BN	PPI
Lombardy	PSI	BN	PPI
Marche	PPI	PSI	BN
Piedmont	PSI	BN	PLDI
Sardinia	BN	PPI	PSI
Sicily	BN	SD	PLDI
Trentino	PPI	BN	SeT
Tuscany	PSI	PPI	BN
Umbria	PSI	PPI	BN
Veneto	PPI	PSI	BN
Venezia Giulia	BN	PPI	SeT
