= Cesare Rossi (politician) =

Italian politician (1887–1967)

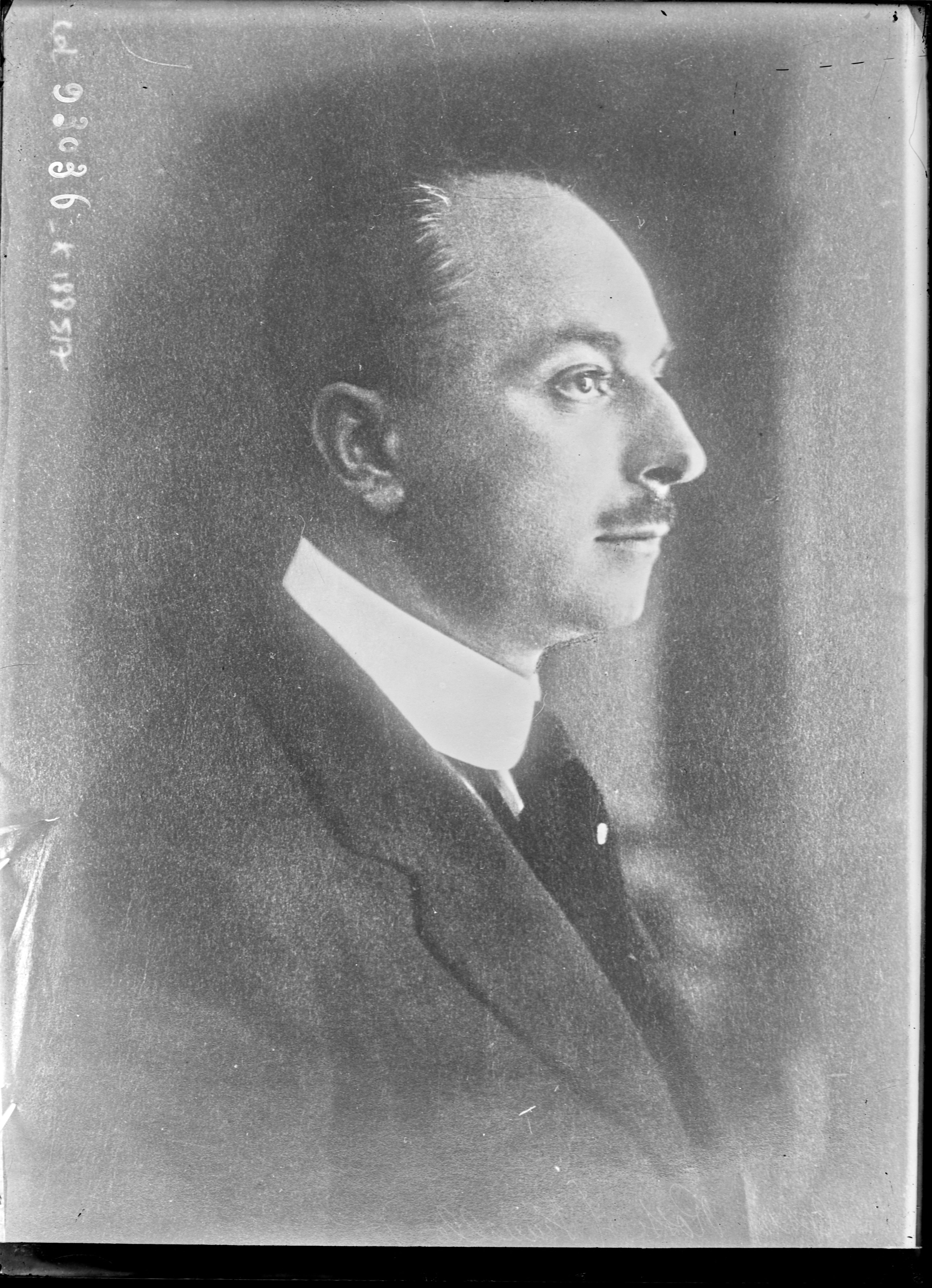
Rossi in 1924

Cesare Rossi (21 September 1887, in Pescia – 9 August 1967, in Rome) was an Italian fascist leader who later became estranged from the regime.

== Syndicalism ==
Rossi began his political career on the left with the Italian Socialist Party (PSI) and as a writer for various syndicalist journals. However he left the PSI in 1907 to serve in the Italian Army and did not rejoin following his demobilisation. Instead he embraced syndicalism, fully by becoming a leading member of the Unione Sindacale Italiana. He joined the Fasci di Azione Rivoluzionaria in 1914 and by 1919 this had led to him joining the Fasci italiani di combattimento.

== Fascism ==
A leading writer for Il Popolo d'Italia, Rossi was recognised as one of Benito Mussolini's closest advisers in the early days of the fascist movement. Rossi soon gained a reputation for his moderation and was instrumental in the Pact of Pacification, a 1921 agreement that temporarily slowed down the violence of the Blackshirts. Working with Mussolini he also developed a strategy of trying to win over the left into a cross-class alliance. He attained the rank of assistant secretary of the movement in 1921 and was effective leader in Tuscany whilst he went on to sit on the National Fascist Party national council and the Grand Council of Fascism.

He was the leader of a fascio and an important figure in the March on Rome. Following this seizure of power Rossi was appointed director of Mussolini's Press and Propaganda Office. He was also central in organising not only the 1924 election but also the reprisals against the areas that had rejected fascism which followed. A potential conflict of interest had arisen in February 1923 when Mussolini banned Fascist Party members from involvement in Freemasonry but ultimately the ban was not enforced as Rossi was just one of a number of Freemasons prominent within the party.

Cesare Rossi et Giuseppe Mingrino (1926)

== Allegations of murder ==
Rossi's rise through the ranks of the fascist state came to an abrupt end in 1924 with the murder of Giacomo Matteotti, after he was accused of being responsible. It was argued that Rossi, who had flown into a rage after one of the two speeches that sealed Matteotti's fate, had ordered his deputy Amerigo Dumini to kill the Socialist deputy for his anti-fascism. The incident, which angered even some fascists, led to a split between Rossi and Mussolini.

The indifference and silence first, and then the ambush organized by De Bono, naturally on your orders, is a gesture that outrages me and frees me from any obligation of generosity. Come on: if in these days I do not have proof of your awareness in relation to the duties of solidarity not so much towards my person and my past, not so much towards my capacity as your collaborator and sometimes executor of illegal actions ordered by you, but above all towards the elementary requirement of Reason of State, I will give effect to what I declared to you this morning and which I have perfected during the day. I am referring to the Misuri attack, the Amendola attack, the sending of Dumini to France with the money provided by Finzi in agreement with Bastianini, to avenge Geri, the attack to Cesare Forni, the demonstration against the Nitti house, which degenerated into looting, to the recent demonstration against the opposition ordered by you to Foschi

— LETTER FROM CESARE ROSSI TO THE HONORABLE MUSSOLINI IMMEDIATELY AFTER THE MATTEOTTI CRIME

Rossi fled to France and then Switzerland to escape prosecution and became a critic of fascism in his exile. He was tricked into returning to Italy in 1928, where he was arrested by fascist police. In 1929, he was sentenced to 30 years imprisonment for anti-fascist activities. In 1940, Rossi was exiled to the island of Ponza until December 1942. In November 1943, he was arrested by the Allies. He was released in March 1944. A tribunal in Rome later sentenced Rossi to 4 years and two months in prison for other crimes, although he was quickly pardoned. In 1947, he was arrested for his involvement in the murder of Matteotti. However, Rossi was acquitted due to insufficient evidence. He then returned to journalism, and abandoned politics. He died in 1967.

In the Florestano Vancini's film The Assassination of Matteotti (1973), Rossi is played by Cesare Barbetti. In Joe Wright's miniseries Mussolini: Son of the Century (2025), he is played by Francesco Russo.
