= Mussolini: Son of the Century =

2024 Italian-French biographical television series

- Italian Sky Atlantic poster
- Italian: M. Il figlio del secolo
- Genre: Biographical; Historical drama
- Based on: M: Son of the Century by Antonio Scurati
- Written by: Stefano Bises; Davide Serino; Antonio Scurati
- Directed by: Joe Wright
- Starring: Luca Marinelli; Francesco Russo; Barbara Chichiarelli; Benedetta Cimatti; Claudio Bigagli; Gabriele Falsetta; Federico Majorana; Federico Mainardi; Paolo Pierobon; Daniele Trombetti; Cosima Centurioni; Lorenzo Zurzolo; Gaetano Bruno; Vincenzo Nemolato; Gianluca Gobbi; Alberto Astorri; Roberto De Francesco; Fulvio Falzarano; Massimo De Lorenzo; Gianmarco Vettori; Maurizio Lombardi; Giovanni Alfieri; Michele Ferrantino; Elena Lietti
- Composer: Tom Rowlands
- Countries of origin: Italy; France
- Original languages: Italian; Romagnol
- No. of episodes: 8

Production
- Executive producers: Joe Wright; Nils Hartmann; Erica Negri; Emanuele Marchesi; Ardavan Safaee; Elena Recchia; Simone Gattoni; Paolo Sorrentino; Pablo Larraín; Valerio Bonelli
- Producer: Lorenzo Mieli
- Cinematography: Seamus McGarvey
- Editor: Valerio Bonelli
- Running time: 60–61 minutes
- Production companies: Sky Studios; The Apartment Pictures; Fremantle; Pathé; Small Forward Productions

Original release
- Network: Sky Atlantic
- Release: 10 January – 31 January 2025

Mussolini: Son of the Century (Italian: M. Il figlio del secolo) is a biographical historical drama television series directed by Joe Wright, based on the 2018 novel M: Son of the Century by Antonio Scurati. Starring Luca Marinelli as Benito Mussolini, the series centers on the early political career of Mussolini in the 1920s. It premiered at the 81st Venice International Film Festival on 5 September 2024 and began airing on Sky Atlantic on 10 January 2025.

== Premise ==
The series follows Benito Mussolini's early career from his founding of the Fasci Italiani in 1919 up to the assassination of socialist politician Giacomo Matteotti in 1924 and his speech in Parliament on 3 January 1925.

== Cast and characters ==
=== Main ===
- Luca Marinelli as Benito Mussolini
- Francesco Russo as Cesare Rossi
- Barbara Chichiarelli as Margherita Sarfatti
- Benedetta Cimatti as Rachele Mussolini
- Claudio Bigagli as General Guglielmo Pecori Giraldi
- Gabriele Falsetta as Roberto Farinacci
- Federico Majorana as Amerigo Dumini
- Federico Mainardi as Albino Volpi
- Paolo Pierobon as Gabriele D'Annunzio
- Daniele Trombetti as Cesare Forni
- Cosima Centurioni as Bianca Ceccato
- Lorenzo Zurzolo as Italo Balbo
- Gaetano Bruno as Giacomo Matteotti
- Vincenzo Nemolato as King Victor Emmanuel III
- Gianluca Gobbi as Cesare Maria de Vecchi
- Alberto Astorri as Luigi Facta
- Roberto De Francesco as Prefect Alfredo Lusignoli
- Fulvio Falzarano as Giovanni Giolitti
- Massimo De Lorenzo as Alfredo Rocco
- Gianmarco Vettori as Dino Grandi
- Maurizio Lombardi as Emilio De Bono
- Giovanni Alfieri as Amleto Poveromo
- Michele Ferrantino as Giuseppe Viola
- Elena Lietti as Velia Matteotti

=== Supporting ===
- Matilde Potenza as Edda Mussolini
- Amedeo Gullà as Augusto Malacria
- Taiyo Yamanouchi as Harukichi Shimoi
- Paolo Macedonio as Don Luigi Sturzo
- Jessica Piccolo Valerani as Ida Dalser
- Daniele Paoloni as Rodolfo De Bernardt
- Thomas Nebuloni as Neroncino
- Alfonso De Vreese as Federico Guglielmo Florio
- Stefano Cenci as Filippo Tommaso Marinetti
- Mauro Leuce as Quinto Navarra
- Alessio Del Mastro as Giavazzi
- Luigi Fiorentino as Francesco Saverio Nitti
- Giorgia Sinicorni as Queen Elena
- Federico Dilirio as Officer Sarzana
- Ferdinando Gattuccio as Officer Brufani
- Gioele Baldini as Bruno Mussolini
- Lorenzo Angelis as Vittorio Mussolini

== Episodes ==
| No. | Title | Directed by | Written by | Original release date |
|---|---|---|---|---|
| 1 | "Chapter 1" | Joe Wright | Stefano Bises & Davide Serino & Antonio Scurati | 10 January 2025 |
On March 23, 1919, Benito Mussolini founded the Fasci Italiani di Combattimento, a movement that embodies his revolutionary political beliefs. But the achievement of consensus is far away: only a few hundred war veterans, as well as mutilated and desperate people, joined the first Fasci. Furthermore, someone else steals the show: the poet, war hero, and ace of the skies Gabriele D'Annunzio militarily takes Fiume. So Mussolini throws himself into the elections: the socialists, his former comrades, now enemies, win. He barely gets any votes and is arrested.
| 2 | "Chapter 2" | Joe Wright | Story by : Stefano Bises & Davide Serino & Antonio Scurati; Teleplay by : Stefano Bises & Davide Serino | 10 January 2025 |
Released after defeat, Mussolini contemplates leaving politics; to "let off steam" about his defeat, he rapes his underage secretary, Bianca Ceccato, who becomes pregnant. But then an unexpected opportunity changes Mussolini's mind and makes him return to politics: the strikes called by the socialists, which paralyze the country, induce landowners and industrialists to seek the help of the Fasci to restore order by force. Fascism, born to lift up the least fortunate, rejects workers and peasants and embraces the cause of the masters and the bourgeoisie. Thanks to his new allies he enters Parliament.
| 3 | "Chapter 3" | Joe Wright | Story by : Stefano Bises & Davide Serino & Antonio Scurati; Teleplay by : Stefano Bises & Davide Serino | 17 January 2025 |
In a country marked by warring classes, Mussolini's strategy is to foment disorder and violence, destabilize the institutions and then offer himself as the only one capable of restoring order and keeping his blackshirts in check. But when it comes to actually stopping the violence, the fascists turn against him.
| 4 | "Chapter 4" | Joe Wright | Story by : Stefano Bises & Davide Serino & Antonio Scurati; Teleplay by : Stefano Bises & Davide Serino | 17 January 2025 |
The violence of the blackshirts terrorizes the institutions. Mussolini understands that instead of stopping it, it is time to exploit it to the full, and decides to organize the March on Rome, aware of the fact that he would have no chance of success. Surprisingly, Mussolini manages to achieve even more: he becomes head of government.
| 5 | "Chapter 5" | Joe Wright | Story by : Stefano Bises & Davide Serino & Antonio Scurati; Teleplay by : Stefano Bises & Davide Serino | 24 January 2025 |
Mussolini is in power but that power is not enough. He wants new elections with a new electoral law that will ensure him an overwhelming majority in parliament. Don Sturzo, secretary of the Italian People's Party, tries to block his path but Mussolini obtains his expulsion in exchange for concessions to the Church. The law passes, Mussolini only needs a quarter of the votes to have absolute power. Meanwhile, without Mussolini's knowledge, some blackshirts have Don Minzoni killed.
| 6 | "Chapter 6" | Joe Wright | Story by : Stefano Bises & Davide Serino & Antonio Scurati; Teleplay by : Stefano Bises & Davide Serino | 24 January 2025 |
To ensure his electoral victory, Mussolini opened the lists of the fascist party to politicians of any formation. In order to be re-elected, many abandon their parties to jump on the bandwagon of the sure winner. But Forni, a charismatic and authoritative fascist leader, rebels in the name of the purity of the movement: Mussolini, fearing losing his people's vote, has him beaten and neutralized.
| 7 | "Chapter 7" | Joe Wright | Story by : Stefano Bises & Davide Serino & Antonio Scurati; Teleplay by : Stefano Bises & Davide Serino | 31 January 2025 |
After an electoral victory that led Mussolini and his fascist allies to almost completely dominate Parliament, the situation becomes dramatic. The socialist deputy Giacomo Matteotti denounces violence and fraud by the black shirts, calls for the annulment of the elections and is preparing to reveal a serious case of corruption that would involve Mussolini himself. Mussolini orders Matteotti to be stopped: the latter is killed and his body hidden.
| 8 | "Chapter 8" | Joe Wright | Story by : Stefano Bises & Davide Serino & Antonio Scurati; Teleplay by : Stefano Bises & Davide Serino | 31 January 2025 |
Matteotti's disappearance first, and then the discovery of his body, shock the country and trigger indignation and suspicion. The investigations demonstrate the direct involvement of men trusted by the Duce, and fascism and its leader now seem on the verge of collapse. Mussolini, to further consolidate his power, takes moral responsibility for the assassination with an epochal speech in Parliament that will lead to the beginning of a dictatorship that will last for twenty years.

== Production ==
=== Development ===
Director Joe Wright met producer Lorenzo Mieli while doing press for Cyrano in 2021. Mieli asked Wright if he wanted to direct a series about Mussolini and Wright "immediately said yes". Mieli stated that Wright was chosen because he could bring an outsider's perspective to the story of Mussolini. Speaking about the series, Wright stated:

I was very careful to tell the truth without being didactic, I tried to understand without sympathizing, maintaining a critical distance... Mussolini was fascinating, he seduced a nation and many others. If I hadn't shown that charm then people might have thought that all Italians were idiots. That balance was my main concern... On a more personal level it's a series about toxic masculinity, which is not something other than us, we have it within us.

Wright's vision for the series was at a "crossroads between Dziga Vertov's Man with a Movie Camera, Scarface and the rave culture of the 1990s". Sky Studios ordered the series in April 2022.

=== Casting ===
At the Rome Film Festival in October 2022, it was announced that Luca Marinelli would play Benito Mussolini. Marinelli was Mieli's first choice for the role of Mussolini. Marinelli shaved his head and gained 20 kilograms (44 lb) for the role. He also had to spend two hours in hair and makeup daily during filming. Wright called Marinelli the "most naturally gifted actor I've ever met" along with Gary Oldman, who starred in Wright's 2017 biopic, Darkest Hour.

=== Filming ===
The series was filmed over a period of six months beginning in November 2022. Filming took place primarily in Rome at Cinecittà Studios. Other filming locations included the Palazzo Reale and the Teatro di San Carlo in Naples, as well as Trieste, Aquileia, Gorizia, and Ruda in Friuli-Venezia Giulia.

=== Music ===
Not wanting the series to feel like a "stuffy period drama biopic", Wright brought on Tom Rowlands of The Chemical Brothers to compose its score. Wright stated that Rowlands's soundtrack helped the series maintain its pace, rhythm, and energy. Elvis Presley's song "Can't Help Falling in Love" was used in the fifth episode.

== Release ==
The series was previewed at the Riviera International Film Festival in May 2023. A teaser trailer for the series was released on 2 August 2024. The series was screened at the 81st Venice International Film Festival on 5 September 2024 and began airing on Sky Atlantic on 10 January 2025.

In May 2025, Mubi acquired the distribution rights to the series in North America, Latin America, Belgium, Luxembourg, Turkey, India, and New Zealand.

== Reception ==
On the review aggregator website Rotten Tomatoes, 96% of 23 critics' reviews are positive, with an average rating of 8.2/10. The website's consensus reads: "Luca Marinelli reigns over Son of the Century with a vibrant impersonation of Benito Mussolini, with director Joe Wright's highly imaginative staging lending a theatricality that suits the infamous dictator. Metacritic, which uses a weighted average, assigned the film a score of 74 out of 100, based on 10 critics, indicating "generally favorable" reviews.

Stephanie Bunbury of Deadline wrote that the series "brilliantly depicts how banal evil gets its way". She further wrote, "M. Son of the Century sticks to the facts of the great dictator's life, which are extraordinary enough, but stretches those facts into surreal shapes until we feel we're in some parallel historical universe. Wright's brassy style — unlike anything he has done before — owes something to [Federico] Fellini, but a whole lot more to its subject. Because Benito Mussolini, apart from anything else, definitely knew how to put on a show."

Valerio Sammarco of Cinematografo gave the series five out of five stars and wrote, "Whirling and pyrotechnic, Joe Wright's Sky series arrives Out of Competition at Venice81: a monstrous performance by Luca Marinelli, who breaks the fourth wall to tell us about the rise of the Duce." Mauro Donzelli of Comingsoon.it also gave the series five out of five stars, calling it "a marvel" and "an extraordinary parable between the intoxication of violence and the ghosts of power".

Paola Casella of Mymovies.it gave the series four out of five stars and called it "an intelligent series with a fearless script and an inspired cast" and "a work that takes the bull by the horns, tackling a slice of Italian history with great narrative breadth and immense production effort".

Antonio Cuomo of Movieplayer.it gave the series four out of five stars and wrote, "M. Son of the Century is an impressive and important work, for the production values it uses and for the narrative and visual construction by Joe Wright to do justice on screen to the novel by Antonio Scurati, from which it takes inspiration. Luca Marinelli's work on the character is good, at the center of a cast that manages to offer a complete and multifaceted cross-section of the moment and the figures that brought it to life. A series that evolves in its eight episodes to leave us with important food for thought and a subtle sense of uneasiness that we struggle to shake off. As great stories can do."

Chiara Guida of Cinefilos.it gave the series three-and-a-half out of five stars and wrote, "M. Son of the Century is a candidate to be the most important Italian television event of this season and perhaps also for the seasons to come, a product that unfortunately also speaks of contemporaneity and that could be welcomed even outside national borders."

Marianna Ciarlante of Today rated the series 8.8 out of 10 and wrote, "Every aspect of this series is a winner, from the direction to the screenplay, from the cast to the lighting, right down to the perfect soundtrack by The Chemical Brothers. Futuristic, original, provocative and provocative, M. Son of the Century is a series not to be missed."

Elisa Giudici of Gamesurf rated the series 8.5 out of 10 and wrote, "M. Son of the Century is a great serial adaptation that immediately understands that the only way to do justice to its literary source and to history is to betray it from the beginning, conversing with the current audience, making contemporary anxieties resonate in its narration, creating a charismatic, sometimes overbearing identity. It will be one of the cult series of 2025."

Claudia Catalli of Wired Italia called the series "great, great cinema." She further wrote, "Starting with Wright's direction, free, impeccable and obsessively attentive to details as to convey the atmosphere, masterfully alternating fiction with repertoire, behind a meticulous work [that is] both historical and visionary. The pace is incandescent, and the notable writing work, starting from the significant Strega Prize-winning novel by Antonio Scurati and arriving at the excellent screenplay by Stefano Bises and Davide Serino, offers memorable passages, without ever falling into rhetoric and without forgetting irony (fundamental, in a story already historically tragic, dark and violent in itself)."

Paolo Nizza of Sky TG24 called the series "a very powerful fiction that with an imaginative and cinematic style". He also commended the cast's performances, stating that "Luca Marinelli should be given every award available on the globe" and that "the entire cast seems inclined to excellence". Antonella Catena of Style Magazine called the series "pure cinema" and Gabriele Lingiardi of Badtaste called the series a "majestic work of production".

Academy Award-nominated screenwriter Paul Schrader praised the series as it met his high expectations and complimented that "it had The Conformist's fingerprints all over it".

== Accolades ==
The limited series also won the prestigious Peabody Award.
