= Murder of Giacomo Matteotti =

1924 kidnapping and murder of Italian politician Giacomo Matteotti

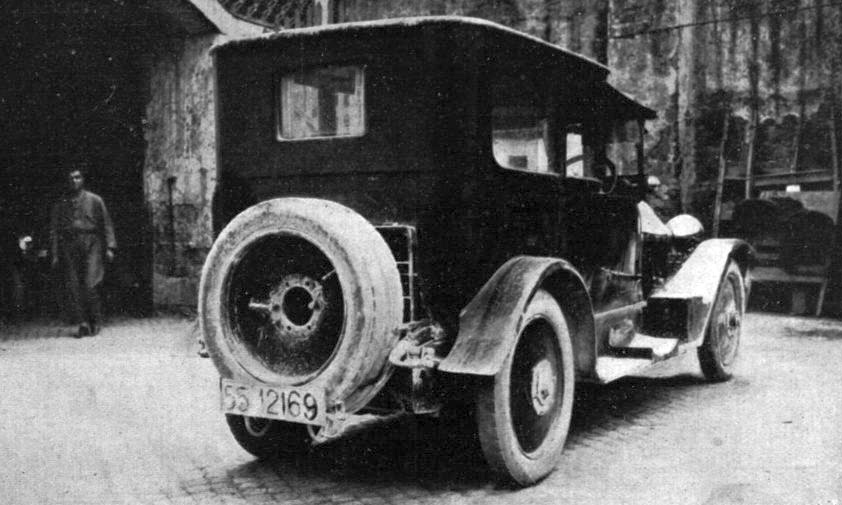
- The car used by the fascist squad to kidnap and murder Matteotti
- Location: Rome, Italy
- Date: June 10, 1924
- Attack type: Kidnapping, assassination, state terrorism, stabbing
- Weapon: Knives
- Victim: Giacomo Matteotti
- Perpetrators: Amerigo Dumini, Albino Volpi, Amleto Poveromo, Giuseppe Viola and Augusto Malacria.
- Motive: Silence opposition to Benito Mussolini

The murder of Giacomo Matteotti was the kidnapping and killing of Italian socialist politician Giacomo Matteotti by a group of Fascists led by Amerigo Dumini on 10 June 1924. Matteotti, secretary of the Unitary Socialist Party (PSU) and one of the most prominent parliamentary opponents of Benito Mussolini's government, was abducted in Rome ten days after delivering a speech in the Chamber of Deputies denouncing violence and intimidation during the 1924 Italian general election. His body was discovered on 16 August at the Quartarella, near Riano, north of Rome.

The investigation rapidly identified members of the group responsible for the abduction. Magistrates Mauro Del Giudice and Umberto Tancredi subsequently investigated their relationship with a clandestine Fascist organization commonly known as the Ceka. The inquiry traced connections from Dumini's group to senior Fascist officials including Giovanni Marinelli and Cesare Rossi and investigated the organization's relationship with the Presidency of the Council.

The first trial, held at Chieti in March 1926, convicted Dumini, Albino Volpi and Amleto Poveromo of omicidio preterintenzionale, finding them responsible for Matteotti's death without finding an intent to kill. After the fall of Fascism the case was reopened. A second trial in Rome in 1947 convicted Dumini, Poveromo and Giuseppe Viola of Matteotti's premeditated kidnapping and murder.

The extent of Mussolini's personal responsibility has remained a subject of historical debate. Allegations that responsibility for the operation extended to Mussolini arose during the original investigation, while later historians have differed over the degree to which the surviving evidence establishes his personal role and the intended outcome of the operation. Historian Denis Mack Smith argued for Mussolini's direct responsibility while distinguishing that question from uncertainty over the precise instructions transmitted to the perpetrators. Mauro Canali has argued that the murder was premeditated and that Mussolini bore personal responsibility from the beginning.

The murder produced the political confrontation known as the Matteotti Crisis. Most parliamentary opposition groups subsequently withdrew from the Chamber in the Aventine Secession.

== Background ==
=== Matteotti and Fascist violence ===
Matteotti had been one of the most persistent parliamentary opponents of Fascist violence before Mussolini became prime minister in October 1922. He systematically collected and publicized evidence of assaults, intimidation and interference with political activity by Fascist squads. After the split within Italian socialism, he became secretary of the Unitary Socialist Party.

Fascist violence against political opponents continued after Mussolini entered government. Alongside violence carried out by local Fascist organizations, a smaller group of militants operating in Rome became involved in clandestine attacks against political opponents and Fascist dissidents.

=== 1924 general election and Matteotti's speech ===
The 1924 Italian general election was held under the Acerbo Law, which awarded two-thirds of the seats in the Chamber of Deputies to the list receiving the largest share of the vote, provided it obtained at least 25 per cent. The National List headed by Mussolini won the election amid violence and intimidation by Fascist squads.

On 30 May 1924, during debate over the validation of the newly elected Chamber, Matteotti delivered a speech challenging the conduct of the election. He described cases of violence, coercion and interference with opposition candidates and voters and called for the election results to be invalidated.

On 24 June, Senator Luigi Albertini, speaking in the Senate, summarized some aspects of Matteotti's speech.

The Hon. Matteotti recently observed in the Chamber, in the speech that earned him his death sentence, that the Hon. Mussolini did not consider himself bound by the verdict of the elections and that he had made it clear that, even in the event of defeat, he would retain power by armed force. A resounding yes from the majority and an affirmative nod from the Prime Minister confirmed the Socialist deputy's assertion. Now, that yes and that nod describe, better than the most extensive dissertation could, the illegality of a political situation that may be summed up as follows: if there was consent, Fascism and its leader were only too willing to acknowledge it; but if consent were lacking, power would be retained by force.

— L. Albertini

As several later testimonies would recount, there was more than that affirmative nod. Benito Mussolini had let slip ominous words of threat: “It is high time this man was no longer allowed to walk free... Fascism is cowardly if it still allows this enemy of ours to speak.” Mussolini's words were heard by Emilio Lussu in the Palazzo Montecitorio immediately after Matteotti's speech. According to Ezio Riboldi as well, referring to Giacomo Matteotti, Benito Mussolini told those around him, “get him out of my way”; Riboldi wrote that the remark “spread through all the corridors of Montecitorio”.

It was ultimately one of Mussolini's closest collaborators, who had fallen from favor in the aftermath of the murder, who confirmed that the order for the crime had come from the Fascist leader. In 1944, Cesare Rossi explicitly stated that Mussolini had told him:

After that speech, this man should no longer be allowed to walk free

— Benito Mussolini

== Fascist Ceka ==
The men who abducted Matteotti belonged to a pre-existing group of Fascist militants involved in clandestine political violence. The organization became commonly known as the Fascist Ceka, after the Soviet Cheka. It was not a formally constituted government police organization. Mussolini entrusted Cesare Rossi with organizing the group, whose operational nucleus included Amerigo Dumini and Albino Volpi. This group performed acts of violence against political opponents and Fascist dissidents.

Two senior Fascist officials became particularly important to the Matteotti investigation: Giovanni Marinelli, administrative secretary of the National Fascist Party (PNF), and Cesare Rossi, a close associate of Mussolini and head of the press office of the Presidency of the Council. But also the police chief Emilio De Bono had a part in the plot: on 1 June 1924, he ordered Otto Thierschädl (the spotter of the assassination squad) to be released from prison, with a telegram signed "for the Minister of the Interior"; at that time, the Minister of the Interior ad interim was Mussolini.

The investigation conducted by Del Giudice and Tancredi reconstructed connections between the group responsible for the kidnapping, Rossi and Marinelli, and examined the relationship between the clandestine organization and the Presidency of the Council.

== Kidnapping and murder ==
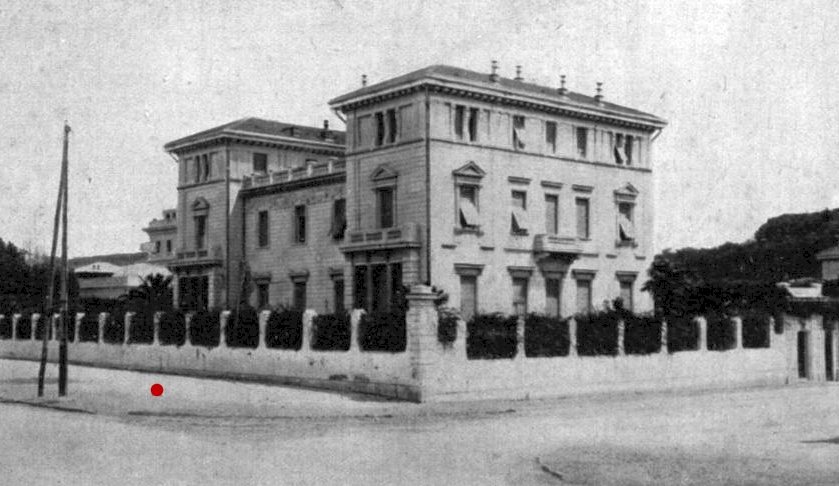
Location of Matteotti's kidnapping

On the afternoon of 10 June 1924, Matteotti left his home in Rome and walked along the Lungotevere Arnaldo da Brescia. He was intercepted by a group travelling in a Lancia automobile and forced into the vehicle after resisting his abductors.

The group included Amerigo Dumini, Albino Volpi, Amleto Poveromo, Giuseppe Viola and Augusto Malacria. Matteotti was killed while in their custody. The participants subsequently gave conflicting accounts of the circumstances of his death, and whether the killing had been planned in advance became one of the central issues in the criminal proceedings.

The kidnappers concealed Matteotti's body in a wooded area at the Quartarella, near Riano. It remained undiscovered for more than two months.

Two days after the abduction, the car used in the operation was identified. The car was registered to Filippo Filippelli, editor of the newspaper Corriere Italiano, who had instructed a garage owner to hand it over to Dumini several days earlier. This discovery provided a crucial lead for the initial investigation, which soon identified Dumini as the principal suspect in the murder. On 12 June, after visiting Cesare Rossi at his home, Filippelli began to show signs of anxiety and instructed Carlo Bazzi to inform Dumini that he would be unable to meet him. A few hours later, Amerigo Dumini was arrested at Termini station on 12 June as he was preparing to leave. He was carrying a suitcase containing Matteotti's bloodstained trousers.

=== Awareness in State and Party organs ===
On the night of 12 June, a four-way meeting took place in De Bono’s office at the Viminale: "it already amounted to an attempt by those who ran the Ceka to establish an alibi in advance. That meeting between De Bono, Rossi, Marinelli and Finzi tells us, notwithstanding the participants’ conflicting accounts, that the highest levels of both the Fascist Party and the state were fully aware of what had happened".

=== Discovery of the body ===
On 16 August 1924, Matteotti's body was discovered at the Quartarella, near Riano. The discovery confirmed his death but did not resolve questions concerning the planning and organization of the crime.

By then his disappearance had already produced a major political confrontation. Most opposition deputies had withdrawn from parliamentary activity in what became known as the Aventine Secession.

== Investigation ==
=== Identification of the kidnappers ===
The investigation quickly focused on the automobile used in the abduction. The vehicle had been obtained through Filippo Filippelli, director of the Fascist newspaper Corriere Italiano, and its identification helped investigators trace members of the group responsible for the kidnapping.

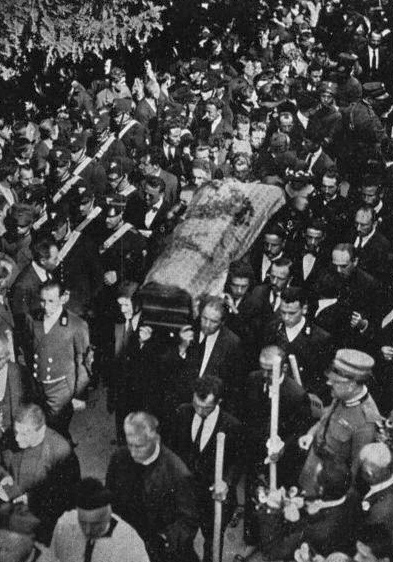
Funerals of Giacomo Matteotti in Fratta Polesine

The rapid identification of the operational group shifted the investigation toward the organization behind it and the possible involvement of senior Fascist officials. Handing the matter over to the Judiciary «was a risk that Mussolini accepted reluctantly; but as soon as he did so, a feud broke out among the members of the Ceka and immediately spilled over into the media outlets at each of their disposal. Then came the diversions and attempts at misdirection, more or less authorized by Mussolini, aimed at “chloroforming” the country».

=== Filippelli and Rossi ===
As the investigation closed in on him, Filippelli resigned from Corriere Italiano. Facilitated by the financier Filippo Naldi, Filippelli’s dramatic escape from Rome caused widespread public consternation. He was arrested at Nervi aboard a vessel bound for France.

Before attempting to escape, Filippelli wrote a memorandum in which he sought to exculpate himself and accused Cesare Rossi, Giovanni Marinelli and Mussolini of responsibility for the crime. He also described the existence of the clandestine Fascist organization known as the Ceka. After his arrest, Filippelli initially confirmed his accusations to the investigating magistrates.

Rossi separately prepared a memorandum that circulated during the summer of 1924 and was later published by the opposition newspaper Il Mondo. In it, Rossi attributed responsibility for the crime to Mussolini.

Rossi made additional statements concerning the Matteotti affair in later years. These accounts were produced at different times and under different circumstances and subsequently became part of the evidence considered by historians reconstructing the origin of the operation.

The memoranda also acquired political significance outside the criminal investigation. Opposition politicians attempted to use evidence emerging from the case to obtain the intervention of King Victor Emmanuel III against Mussolini's government. That aspect of the affair is covered in Aventine Secession.

=== Del Giudice–Tancredi investigation ===
The murder was subjected to three criminal proceedings between 1924–1926 and 1944–1950.

The first formal investigation was conducted by Mauro Del Giudice, president of the indictment section of the Rome Court of Appeal, together with investigating judge Umberto Tancredi. The magistrates proceeded on the hypothesis of intentional homicide and investigated the political and organizational relationships behind the group that had abducted Matteotti.

Their inquiry extended beyond the identification of the material perpetrators to the roles of Rossi, Marinelli and other figures within the Fascist establishment.

We should have issued another arrest warrant, against Benito Mussolini, had there not been the constitutional obstacle arising from the fact that he was a member of Parliament and head of government, and therefore subject to the jurisdiction of the Senate sitting as the High Court of Justice, since the crimes with which he was charged had been committed in that capacity

— Mauro Del Giudice, Cronistoria del processo Matteotti (1954)

Del Giudice encountered increasing obstacles as the investigation continued, above all for the temporary stop to his job due to Senate trial.

Stopping the trial against the murderers, the High Court of the Senate started a trial against general Emilio De Bono, commander of the fascist paramilitary Blackshirts; however, he was discharged. Even after this trial, the investigation records were kept strictly secret, to the point that during the flight from the advancing Allied troops in 1944 the fascist leaders stole its documents and took them to Northern Italy, where they were recovered at the end of the World War II.

When the Roman trial started again, Del Giudice was subsequently transferred from Rome to become first president of the Court of Appeal of Catania. Although the new post formally represented a promotion, the transfer removed him from the Matteotti investigation.

The subsequent phase of the inquiry was conducted by other magistrates, while an amnesty cleared all those who had ordered the crime, as they were held responsible for the abduction alone.

== 1926 Chieti trial ==
The trial of the material perpetrators was transferred from Rome to Chieti after the Court of Cassation accepted a request for removal of the proceedings on grounds of "serious reasons of public security". It was held from 16 to 24 March 1926.

Roberto Farinacci, a leading Fascist politician and former secretary of the PNF, participated in the defence of the accused. The prosecution at trial moved away from the original hypothesis of intentional homicide and toward the characterization of the killing as omicidio preterintenzionale.

On 24 March the court convicted Amerigo Dumini, Albino Volpi and Amleto Poveromo of omicidio preterintenzionale. Under this characterization they were held responsible for Matteotti's death but were not found to have intended to kill him. Each was sentenced to five years, eleven months and twenty days' imprisonment. Giuseppe Viola and Augusto Malacria were acquitted.

An amnesty substantially reduced the practical effect of the sentences: the convicted individuals were released a few days after the trial.

== Reopening of the case and 1947 trial ==
After the fall of Fascism, the validity of the earlier proceedings was reconsidered. Legislation adopted in July 1944 made it possible to reopen judicial decisions issued under Fascism, and the Matteotti case was reopened.

On 6 November 1944, the Court of Cassation declared the 1926 judgment legally nonexistent, clearing the way for a new trial.

The reopened proceedings also considered the position of Benito Mussolini. In the committal proceedings, however, the prosecutor general's submission of 27 March 1946 was accepted insofar as it declared that no proceedings could continue against Mussolini because the alleged offence had been extinguished by his death.

The new trial was held before the Court of Assizes in Rome. Among the defendants were Francesco Giunta, Cesare Rossi, Amerigo Dumini, Giuseppe Viola, Filippo Filippelli and Filippo Panzeri. Other figures implicated in the earlier proceedings, including Giovanni Marinelli and Emilio De Bono, had died before the trial.

On 4 April 1947 the court convicted Dumini, Amleto Poveromo and Giuseppe Viola of Matteotti's premeditated kidnapping and murder and sentenced them to life imprisonment; Viola was tried in absentia. For the other defendants the court declared that proceedings could not continue because of the post-war amnesty.

The life sentences were subsequently commuted to thirty years' imprisonment.

The judgment reversed the central characterization adopted at Chieti. The 1926 court had found omicidio preterintenzionale, whereas the 1947 court found the killing to have been premeditated. Since Mussolini had died before the new trial, the judgment did not determine his criminal liability for the murder.

== Responsibility and historiography ==
=== Contemporary evidence and early interpretations ===
Allegations that responsibility for the operation extended to the highest levels of the Fascist government arose during the original investigation.

Filippelli's memorandum accused Rossi, Marinelli and Mussolini of responsibility for the crime. Rossi likewise attributed responsibility for the murder to Mussolini in his 1924 memorandum.

Journalist Carlo Silvestri also initially accused Mussolini. Depositions given by Silvestri on 29 and 30 September 1924 identified Mussolini as the instigator of the crime, according to his biographer, and Silvestri renewed the accusation before the High Court of Justice in January 1925.

Silvestri later reversed his position. After establishing a relationship with Mussolini during the Italian Social Republic, he argued after the Second World War that Mussolini had not ordered the murder and attributed responsibility instead to Marinelli and financial interests.

Gaetano Salvemini obtained copies of more than 4,000 pages from the original Del Giudice–Tancredi investigation. Five volumes containing the material were deposited at the London School of Economics on 7 January 1927, and Salvemini used the documentation in preparing The Fascist Dictatorship in Italy.

Accusations of Mussolini's direct involvement therefore formed part of the contemporary debate over the crime, independently of later interpretations concerning its motive.

=== Later historiography ===
In Mussolini il fascista, historian Renzo De Felice assigned a central role to Giovanni Marinelli, describing him as the principal person responsible for the action against Matteotti.

In a study presented in 1982 and published in 1983, Denis Mack Smith described De Felice as representative of an interpretation which did not hold Mussolini directly responsible for the crime but attributed to him indirect responsibility for having created the political and moral climate in which Fascist violence occurred.

Mack Smith rejected that conclusion. He noted Dumini's account that the order to attack Matteotti had been transmitted through Marinelli and argued that it was implausible for Marinelli to have undertaken such an operation independently of Mussolini. On the basis of the relationships between Mussolini, Marinelli and Dumini's group, together with evidence concerning previous Fascist political violence, Mack Smith argued for a presumption of Mussolini's direct responsibility.

Mack Smith nevertheless distinguished the question of who authorized the operation from the precise outcome originally intended. His interpretation of Mussolini's responsibility therefore did not depend on treating every possible instruction to act against Matteotti as necessarily equivalent to an explicit order to murder him.

Mauro Canali later re-examined the case using judicial records and additional archival material. Canali has argued for a stronger conclusion concerning the intended outcome of the operation: in his reconstruction, Matteotti's murder was carefully premeditated and Mussolini bore personal responsibility for it from the beginning.

Canali developed his reconstruction further in The Matteotti Murder and Mussolini: The Anatomy of a Fascist Crime (2024).

== Motive ==
Matteotti was one of the most prominent parliamentary opponents of the Fascist government. He had documented Fascist violence and, on 30 May 1924, publicly challenged the conduct of the general election. His murder occurred ten days after that speech and five days after the meeting of the Budget Committee on 5 June 1924, when Matteotti had pointed out that the budget presented by Mussolini concealed a considerable deficit behind an apparent balance.

Historians have also examined whether more specific political or financial interests contributed to the decision to act against him.

=== Sinclair Oil hypothesis ===
One historiographical controversy concerns Matteotti's interest in financial affairs involving the Fascist government and the American Sinclair Oil Corporation, which had obtained an oil concession in Italy.

After the Second World War, Carlo Silvestri advanced a financial explanation after abandoning his earlier accusation against Mussolini. Silvestri attributed the crime to Marinelli and financial interests and argued that Mussolini had not ordered the murder.

Canali later advanced a different interpretation on the basis of judicial and archival material. He has argued that financial corruption and interests surrounding the Sinclair concession contributed to the motive for Matteotti's murder, while also maintaining that Mussolini bore personal responsibility for the crime.

The proposed connection between the Sinclair concession and the murder is a historiographical interpretation rather than a motive established by either of the criminal judgments. Indeed, the final judgment, delivered after the Second World War, addressed the issue in the following terms:

Who, then, was the businessman or who were the businessmen who allegedly commissioned the crime? (...) Various names have been mentioned more or less at random (De Bono, Bazzi, Edoardo Torre), and grandiose phrases have been uttered ("a rotten milieu of shady finance", "the crimes of the most unscrupulous and ruthlessly speculative capitalism"), but no concrete evidence has been presented (...) It is clear that the political motive, consisting in the interest—and indeed the necessity—of eliminating Matteotti, fascism's most formidable opponent, is so evident that any other alleged motive must be regarded as unfounded.

== Political consequences ==
Matteotti's disappearance and the evidence connecting members of the group responsible for his abduction with figures in the Fascist establishment produced the political confrontation known as the Matteotti Crisis.

On 27 June 1924, most parliamentary opposition groups began a withdrawal from the Chamber of Deputies that became known as the Aventine Secession. The opposition sought the restoration of constitutional legality and attempted to induce King Victor Emmanuel III to intervene against Mussolini's government.

The king did not dismiss Mussolini. On 3 January 1925, after months of political confrontation, Mussolini addressed the Chamber of Deputies and assumed what he called the "political, moral and historical responsibility" for what had occurred. The speech was followed by the further consolidation of the Fascist dictatorship.

The development of the political crisis, the opposition's strategy, relations with the Crown and the eventual expulsion of the opposition deputies are covered in Aventine Secession (20th century).

== See also ==
- Aventine Secession (20th century)
- Fascist Italy (1922–1943)
