= National Fasces =

National Fasces Fasci Nazionali
- Leader: Cesare Forni
- Founded: 1924; 101 years ago
- Dissolved: 1926; 99 years ago
- Split from: National Fascist Party
- Ideology: Intransigent fascism National syndicalism Revolutionary nationalism
- Political position: Far-right

The National Fasces (Italian: Fasci Nazionali, FN) were an Italian intransigent fascist and national syndicalist political party led by Cesare Forni. The party was part of the dissident fascist movement, which opposed Benito Mussolini and, especially, his closest advisors within the leadership group of the National Fascist Party (PNF).

== History ==
The National Fasces were formed at the initiative of the trade unionist Cesare Forni, who was expelled from the PNF, and who managed to unite other militants expelled from the party into this faction: they began organizing in February 1924 in Voghera. Forni reached an agreement with Raimondo Sala, another former squadrista who had left the PNF in the province of Alessandria. Forni and Sala sought an understanding with Ottavio Corgini and Alfredo Misuri, who were leading the association "Patria e Libertà", but later Corgini and Misuri did not join this party. Furthermore, Forni failed to convince other dissident fascist militants, who leaned toward abstention in the elections: in fact, Forni and Sala decided to present their party in the elections of 6 April 1924. However, the party ran only in the constituencies of Lombardy and Piedmont, obtaining 18,062 votes: the only elected member to the Chamber was its founder Forni.

A few weeks before the election. on 12 March 1924, Forni was attacked at the Milan Central Station by some squadristi including Dumini, Volpi, Malachia, the consortium members in the so-called Fascist Cheka, the same ones who would shortly thereafter kill Giacomo Matteotti. On 26 April 1924 elections were held and Cesare Forni was elected, the only deputy on his list.

Despite the attack and his opposition to Mussolini's leadership, Forni remained faithful to him and voted his confidence in his government several times, including the one requested in 1925 by the Duce after the Giacomo Matteotti crime. In the courtroom he declared himself an "interpreter of healthy fascist public opinion".

The National Fasces were dissolved in 1926, when the PNF was declared the sole party of the Kingdom of Italy, although Forni retained his seat in the Chamber of Deputies until the end of his term in 1929.

== Electoral results ==
Chamber of Deputies
Election year	Votes	%	Seats	+/−	Leader
1924	18,062 (14th)	0.25	1 / 535	–	Cesare Forni

== See also ==
- Fasci Italiani di Combattimento
