= Dumini =

Dumini is a surname. Notable people with the surname include:

- Adolfo Dumini (1863–?), Italian painter
- Amerigo Dumini (1894–1967), American-born Italian Fascist hitman
