= Cesare Forni =

Italian politician

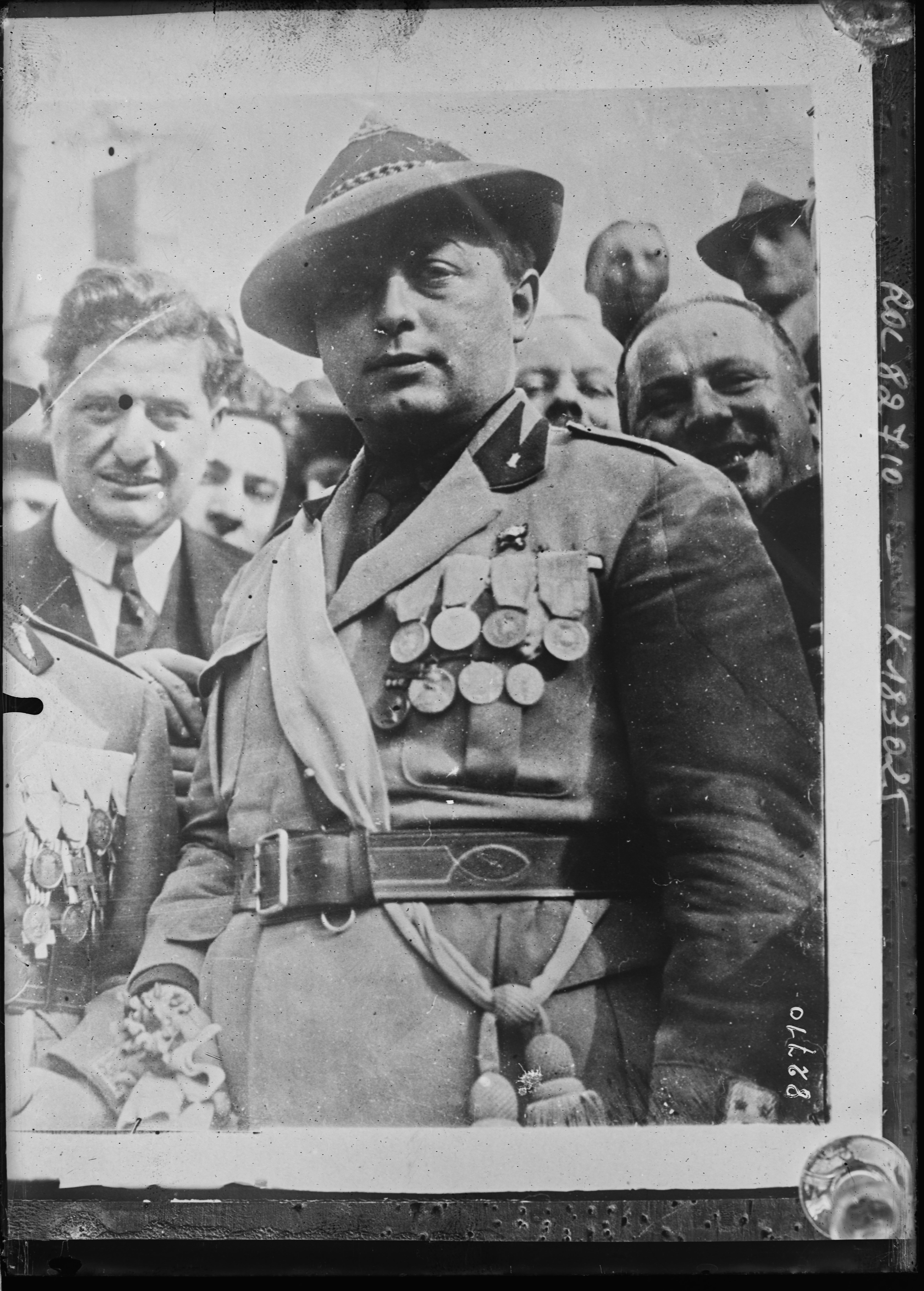
- Cesar Forni, Inspector General of the Squadrismo in 1923

Member of the Chamber of Deputies
- In office 1924–1929

Personal details
- Born: 17 November 1890 Vespolate, Kingdom of Italy
- Died: 2 July 1943 (aged 52) Milan, Kingdom of Italy
- Other political affiliations: Fasci Italiani di Combattimento (1919-1921); National Fascist Party (1921-1924); National Fasces (1924-1929)
- Education: Polytechnic University of Turin
- Awards: Silver Medal of Military Valor; Bronze Medal of Military Valor (x2); Medal for Bravery (in gold)

Military service
- Allegiance: Kingdom of Italy
- Branch/service: Royal Italian Army (1914–1918); Blackshirts (1919–1924)
- Rank: Capitano
- Battles/wars: World War I: Italian Front

Cesare Forni (Vespolate, 17 November 1890 – Milan, 2 July 1943) was an Italian fascist politician.

== Life ==
Born in 1890 into a wealthy family of agricultural tenants from the Lomellina, he studied engineering at the Turin Polytechnic without completing his studies. Of a restless and rebellious character, he participated with the rank of lieutenant in World War I, earning the rank of captain in the bomber corps, a unit which, like the Arditi, was destined for the most dangerous actions. He obtained a Silver Medal of Military Valor and two Bronze ones.

In 1919, convinced by the then captain Cesare Maria De Vecchi, he joined the fascist squads, of which he quickly became a leading exponent in Piedmont, also founding a newspaper, Il Trincerista. In the meantime, having moved to Mortara, the political and economic center of Lomellina at the time, he put himself at the head of an authentic personal army, made up of hundreds of squadristi, mostly veterans. In short, he was recognized as the undisputed ras (fascist leader) of the entire province of Pavia and head of the provincial fascist federation of Pavia. Mussolini entrusted him with the coordination of all the teams in Lombardy and Piedmont during the days of the March on Rome in October 1922.

He was an exponent of the most radical wing of the movement, a direct expression of the agricultural world and of the frenzied veteranism. In 1923 he was lieutenant general of the first area (Piedmont and Liguria) of the Blackshirts.

Very popular among the squadristi, after the March on Rome and the seizure of power, he was increasingly considered as an inconvenient character for his intransigent fascism and then as a real dissident, for his violent attacks against the new arrivals in the ruling class of the party, without a past of convinced militancy in the movement. In February 1923 he was elected president (governor) of the province of Vigevano. A fascist syndicalist, he found a further reason for confrontation with the cadres of the Party in the non-compliance with the agrarian pacts by the Pavia landowners. He challenged the then political secretary Francesco Giunta, a favorite of Mussolini, to a saber duel which took place in April 1923 in Rome and was suspended by the referees when both duelists were wounded. In December 1923 the disciplinary council of the National Fascist Party suspended him from all the positions he held, the Pavia federation was placed under police administration and in February 1924 he was expelled from the Party.

On the occasion of the 1924 elections for the renewal of the Italian Parliament, dissolved in January by Victor Emmanuel III, together with Raimondo Sala, he presented a dissident fascist list present only in Piedmont and Lombardy, as opposed to the official National List, called National Fasces. On 12 March 1924 Forni was attacked at the Milan Central Station by some squadristi including Dumini, Volpi, Malachia, the consortium members in the so-called Fascist Cheka, the same ones who would shortly thereafter kill Giacomo Matteotti. On 26 April 1924 elections were held and Cesare Forni was elected, the only deputy on his list.

But Forni remained faithful to Mussolini and voted his confidence in his government several times, including the one requested in 1925 by the Duce after the Matteotti murder. In the courtroom he declared himself an "interpreter of healthy fascist public opinion". In 1926 he begged Roberto Farinacci to intercede for a reconciliation with Mussolini. In 1927 and 1928 he left for long periods for Italian Somaliland to carry out some agricultural projects, without luck. He remained a deputy until 1929. However, disappointed and politically now completely on the sidelines, once his parliamentary mandate ended, he retired to private life. In the early 1930s he moved to Milan where he worked as an insurance agent for INA. He married Maria Maddalena Pira di Dogliani.

According to some sources, in 1933 he was readmitted to the NFP and later expelled again, but according to others he was not readmitted to the NFP, which actually kept him under surveillance and in 1941 had him arrested for a short time. He died at the age of 52, of an incurable disease, on 2 July 1943.

A few pages of his diary remain in which, towards the end of the 1930s, he traced merciless judgments on Mussolini. His funeral, celebrated in the basilica of San Lorenzo di Mortara, was followed by thousands of Lomellini, including many of his old political opponents.
