= Aldo Finzi (politician) =

Italian politician

Aldo Finzi

Aldo Finzi (Legnago, 20 April 1891 – Rome, 24 March 1944) was a Jewish-Italian politician and soldier.

== Biography ==
Finzi started out his political career as an alderman in Badia Polesine. He participated in the First World War initially as a soldier, later as an artillery officer and finally as a pilot in the air service of the Royal Italian Army, and was one of the fighter pilots in Gabriele D'Annunzio's flight which dropped propaganda leaflets over Vienna. He was awarded one Silver and two Bronze Medals of Military Valor for his wartime service. Afterwards, he studied law in Ferrara. In 1921, he was one of the nine Jewish deputies elected to the Italian Parliament for the Fasci italiani di combattimento. Having reached the rank of lieutenant colonel, in January 1923 he was appointed Vice Commissioner for the Air Force (the titular commissioner being Benito Mussolini himself, who however delegated all matters to Finzi), a post he held until 1925, being one of the founders of the Regia Aeronautica in 1923.

Finzi had to resign as under-secretary of the interior, when in 1924, the Socialist deputy Giacomo Matteotti was murdered. As Emilio De Bono, also Finzi's testimony implied that they had learned of the murder of Giacomo Matteotti only when Rossi and Marinelli mentioned it; Cesare Rossi, however, would tell Gaetano Salvemini that “I detected not the slightest trace of surprise on their faces, nor any spark of indignation”.

Aldo Finzi and his wife Maria Luigia Clementi

From 1925 to 1928, he was president of the Italian National Olympic Committee. He left the Chamber of Deputies in 1928. He became a fierce opponent of the fascist racial laws of 1938, and in November 1942 he was sentenced to confinement in the Tremiti Islands after publicly declaring that the Allies would win the war and the Fascist regime would collapse. He was released after deposition of Mussolini by the Grand Council of Fascism in July 1943, and after the Armistice of Cassibile he became engaged in the resistance struggle against the German occupying forces, participating in the fighting in Rome in September 1943 and later setting up a Resistance group that carried out sabotage actions against the Germans. In February 1944 he was captured by the SS and identified as a member of the Italian Resistance. In retaliation for a bomb attack which claimed the lives of 33 members of the German Polizeiregiment Bozen on 23 March, he was among the 335 prisoners executed in the Ardeatine massacre on 24 March 1944.
