= Aventine Secession (20th century) =

1924–1926 withdrawal of Italian opposition deputies from parliament

The Aventine Secession was the withdrawal of most opposition deputies from the Italian Chamber of Deputies in protest against the government of Benito Mussolini following the murder of Giacomo Matteotti. Beginning on 27 June 1924, the opposition refused to participate in the work of the Chamber until constitutional legality and democratic freedoms had been restored.

The secession formed the principal parliamentary response to the political crisis caused by Matteotti's disappearance and murder, commonly known as the Matteotti Crisis. The opposition sought to isolate Mussolini's government and relied on constitutional pressure rather than an insurrectionary strategy. The protest failed to produce a change of government: King Victor Emmanuel III did not dismiss Mussolini, while disagreements developed within the opposition over whether to continue the boycott or return to Parliament.

On 3 January 1925 Mussolini addressed the Chamber and assumed what he called the "political, moral and historical responsibility" for what had occurred. The speech was followed by the further suppression of political opposition and is conventionally treated as a decisive stage in the establishment of the Fascist dictatorship. In November 1926 the deputies who had participated in the secession were formally deprived of their parliamentary mandates.

== Background ==
On 30 May 1924, socialist deputy Giacomo Matteotti, secretary of the Unitary Socialist Party, challenged the conduct of the 1924 Italian general election in a speech before the Chamber of Deputies, denouncing violence and intimidation against opposition candidates and voters.

On 10 June Matteotti was abducted in Rome by a group of Fascists and killed. The identification of the kidnappers and evidence of their connections with figures in the Fascist establishment produced a political crisis for Mussolini's government.

The kidnapping, the criminal investigation, the trials of the perpetrators and the subsequent debate over responsibility for the murder are treated in Murder of Giacomo Matteotti.

== Matteotti Crisis ==
Matteotti's disappearance transformed the confrontation between the Fascist government and its parliamentary opponents. The opposition treated the affair as a question of political and constitutional responsibility as well as a criminal investigation.

The crisis also affected the Fascist government and movement. For the opposition, however, the central question became how to use the crisis to obtain a restoration of constitutional legality and a change of government.

== Secession ==
On 27 June 1924 the parliamentary opposition began the protest subsequently known as the Aventine Secession. Led by figures including Giovanni Amendola and Filippo Turati, the participating deputies resolved to abstain from the work of the Chamber until legality had been restored.

The name referred to the secessions of the plebeians in ancient Rome. The opposition's strategy was based principally on political and constitutional pressure rather than insurrection. Its participants expected that the continuing crisis could ultimately lead to the replacement of Mussolini's government.

=== Divisions over strategy ===
The anti-Fascist opposition was not politically unified. The Communists disagreed with the other opposition parties over strategy and proposed the creation of an alternative "anti-parliament". After the other parties rejected the proposal, Communist deputies returned to the Chamber in November 1924.

Differences also developed among the other opposition parties over whether continued abstention or a return to parliamentary activity offered the more effective means of opposing Fascism.

== Developments in 1924 ==
Matteotti's body was discovered near Riano on 16 August 1924. The discovery confirmed his death and intensified the political significance of the affair. Details of the discovery and of the continuing criminal investigation are covered in Murder of Giacomo Matteotti.

During the autumn the Aventine parties continued to make the restoration of legality and the "moral question" raised by the Matteotti affair central to their campaign. At a meeting of the opposition in Milan on 30 November, attended by Turati, Alcide De Gasperi, Giovanni Gronchi, Claudio Treves and Amendola, the "moral question" was again raised.

=== Attempt to obtain royal intervention ===
Material produced by figures implicated in the Matteotti investigation reached members of the opposition during the autumn. The substance of the documents and their significance for the criminal investigation are covered in Murder of Giacomo Matteotti.

For the Aventine opposition, the documents were also potentially a means of obtaining royal intervention. Material including the memorandum of Cesare Rossi passed through opposition circles and was eventually presented by former prime minister Ivanoe Bonomi to Victor Emmanuel III in the hope of prompting an intervention against Mussolini's government. The attempt produced no such intervention.

The failure to obtain action from the Crown exposed a central weakness of a strategy that depended substantially on constitutional pressure outside the Chamber.

== 3 January 1925 ==
On 3 January 1925 Mussolini addressed the Chamber of Deputies and declared that he assumed the "political, moral and historical responsibility" for what had occurred.

The statement was a declaration of political responsibility and was not a judicial admission that Mussolini had ordered Matteotti's murder. The separate historical and judicial controversy over his role in the crime is covered in Murder of Giacomo Matteotti#Responsibility and historiography.

Treccani describes the speech as marking the beginning of the Fascist dictatorship. In the period that followed, the government increasingly restricted political opposition and constitutional freedoms.

== Decline of the secession ==
By the end of 1924 the Aventine strategy had failed to produce a change of government and divisions had become more visible among the opposition parties. Some continued to support abstention from Parliament, while others increasingly favoured returning to the Chamber to confront Fascism there.

The Communist deputies had already returned in November 1924. The Popular and Democratic-Social parliamentary groups later decided to resume participation, but on 16 January 1926 Fascist deputies prevented their effective return to the Chamber.

== Expulsion from Parliament ==
On 9 November 1926, the Chamber considered a motion introduced by Fascist deputy Augusto Turati declaring that 123 deputies who had participated in the Aventine Secession had forfeited their parliamentary mandates.

The adoption of the measure brought the parliamentary history of the Aventine Secession to an end. It occurred as the Fascist government was adopting a wider set of exceptional measures against political opposition.

== Historical assessment ==
Contemporary opponents of the Aventine strategy and later historians have debated whether withdrawal from the Chamber strengthened the opposition's moral and constitutional case while weakening its ability to challenge Mussolini through parliamentary action.

The Dizionario di Storia describes the secession as beginning during a period of crisis for Fascism but argues that the opposition's protest failed to produce a political outcome because its leaders did not return the struggle to Parliament. It identifies the refusal of the Crown to consider an extra-parliamentary solution and the opposition's strategic uncertainty as important elements in the outcome.

== See also ==
- Murder of Giacomo Matteotti
- Fascist Italy (1922–1943)
