= The Assassination of Matteotti =

- Directed by: Florestano Vancini
- Written by: Florestano Vancini; Lucio Battistrada
- Produced by: Gino Mordini
- Starring: Mario Adorf; Franco Nero
- Cinematography: Dario Di Palma
- Edited by: Nino Baragli
- Music by: Egisto Macchi
- Release date: 1973
- Running time: 120 minutes
- Country: Italy
- Language: Italian

The Assassination of Matteotti (Italian: Il delitto Matteotti) is a 1973 Italian historical drama film directed by Florestano Vancini. The film tells the events that led to the tragic end of Giacomo Matteotti and to the establishment of the dictatorship of Benito Mussolini in Italy. It was awarded with the Special Jury Prize at the 8th Moscow International Film Festival.

== Plot ==
In Rome on 30 May 1924, the Honorable Giacomo Matteotti, secretary of the Unitary Socialist Party, in a courageous and engaging speech, asks for the elections of 6 April 1924 to be cancelled and contests their validity. The politician claims that in fact, the government majority list was only nominally supported by more than 4 million votes, but it did not obtain the votes legitimately and freely. He says the result was fraudulent because of the retaliation and violence propagated by the National Fascist Party.

His words immediately arouse reactions in the press and in public opinion, and the fear of popular uprisings is also unleashed within the government. Nothing prevents the mysterious kidnapping of the deputy on 10 June. Public opinion is upset, and the political opposition coagulates and decides to boycott the work of Parliament. It is difficult to start investigations for the rescue of Matteotti, but the media and public pressure force Benito Mussolini to make decisions. A speech is delivered to the Chamber by the future Duce on 3 January 1925 that will turn out to be the real beginning of his dictatorship.

== Cast ==
- Mario Adorf as Benito Mussolini
- Franco Nero as Giacomo Matteotti
- Umberto Orsini as Amerigo Dumini
- Vittorio De Sica as Mauro Del Giudice
- Renzo Montagnani as Umberto Tancredi
- Gastone Moschin as Filippo Turati
- Mario Maffei as Emilio De Bono
- Max Dorian as Roberto Farinacci
- Orazio Stracuzzi as Giovanni Marinelli
- Antonio La Raina as Alfredo Rocco
- Stefano Oppedisano as Piero Gobetti
- Manuela Kustermann as Ada Gobetti
- Riccardo Cucciolla as Antonio Gramsci
- Damiano Damiani as Giovanni Amendola
- Giovanni Brusatori as Emilio Lussu
- Manlio Busoni as Claudio Treves
- Giulio Girola as Vittorio Emanuele III
- Cesare Barbetti as Cesare Rossi
- Pietro Biondi as Filippo Filippelli
- Giorgio Favretto as Giovanni Gronchi
- Michele Malaspina as Archbishop Pietro Gasparri
- Ezio Marano as Alcide De Gasperi
- José Quaglio as Police Chief Bertini
- Gianni Solaro as General Attorney Crisafulli
- Gino Santercole as General of the Militia
- Piero Gerlini as Giuseppe Emanuele Modigliani
- Franco Silva as Benedetto Fasciolo
- Maurizio Arena as "Compagno" Romolo
