= Amerigo Dumini =

American-born Italian assassin (1894–1967)

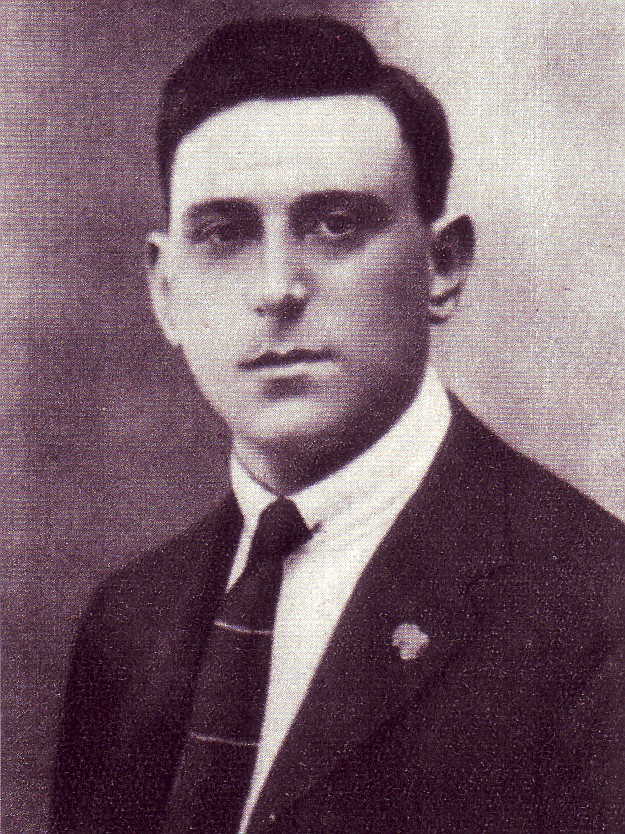
- Amerigo Dumini
- Born: January 3, 1894; St. Louis, Missouri, United States
- Died: December 25, 1967 (aged 73); Rome, Italy
- Status: Deceased
- Allegiance: Fascist Italy
- Conviction: Murder
- Penalty: Life imprisonment (commuted to 30 years)

Details
- Victims: Giacomo Matteotti (aged 39)

Amerigo Dumini (Italian pronunciation: [ameˈriːɡo ˈduːmini]; 3 January, 1894 – 25 December, 1967) was an American-born Italian fascist hitman who led the group responsible for the 1924 assassination of Unitary Socialist Party leader Giacomo Matteotti.

== Biography ==
Born in St. Louis, United States, the son of Italian (father Adolfo Dumini) and British immigrants, Amerigo Dumini moved to Italy and in 1913 he joined the army renouncing his U.S. citizenship. During the First World War he was an assault trooper and was severely wounded and decorated. Then he became active in the Fascio of Florence organized by supporters of Benito Mussolini, taking pride in being referred to as "Sicario del Duce" ("Il Duce's hitman"). He participated in the Sarzana incident on 21 July 1921, leading a column of 300 "squadristi" (Blackshirts) to Sarzana with demands for the liberation of Renato Ricci. Ricci and other fascists had been arrested following armed confrontation with the Arditi del Popolo, an antifascist organization created in 1921 by the anarchist Argo Secondari as an offshoot of the "Arditi" movement.

In 1924 Dumini entered the ranks of Ceka, the secret police which Mussolini based on the Soviet Cheka. Shortly thereafter, on 10 June, he headed the group (Albino Volpi, Giuseppe Viola, Augusto Malacria and Amleto Poveromo) that carried out the killing of Giacomo Matteotti, possibly on the orders of Cesare Rossi, to whom he was assistant at the time. Following the political murder, he was abandoned by the fascist leadership for a while, so he was arrested soon and Mauro Del Giudice rebuked him during the interrogation in the following words:

Look at this jacket. It belonged to your victim of 10 June, an honest man who had done you no harm and whom, perhaps, none of you even knew personally. You have plunged an unfortunate wife and an elderly mother who adored her son into the deepest grief and darkest despair, and you have left three innocent children fatherless

— Mauro Del Giudice, addressing Amerigo Dumini during his interrogation in 1924, quoted in T. M. Rauzino, Il magistrato che fece tremare il Duce (2022)

After the speech of 3 January 1925, in which Mussolini assumed political, moral and historical responsibility for what had occurred, Roberto Farinacci accepted to defend Dumini during his trial. While Farinacci declared himself "honored" by the task, he could not prevent Dumini from receiving a five-year prison sentence, of which he only served eleven months, benefiting from an amnesty ordered by Mussolini.

Once out of jail, he tried his hand at blackmailing the fascist leadership, trying to obtain rewards and the payment of his legal fees. Ostentatiously, he sought a meeting with Mussolini at the Italian Council of Ministers. He justified his entitlement with the words "I am here in order to wash Matteotti's blood off my hands". Arrested, he was put on trial for "offending Il Duce" and sentenced to eight years in prison— substantially more than for the previous crime.

Freed in 1927, Amerigo Dumini left for Italian Somaliland, having been awarded a large state pension (5,000 lire). Apparently, he was still viewed as troublesome, since he was detained and interned on the Tremiti Islands. Meanwhile, he warned General Emilio De Bono that he had filed a manuscript detailing Matteotti's murder with notaries in Texas. This claim led to his release and an increase in pension to as much as 50,000 lire. He left for Italian Libya, where his pension was further increased by 2,500 lire (together with a single payment of 125,000 lire).

Dumini remained in the region for more than a decade and was captured by the British Army at Derna during the North African campaign of World War II. Sentenced to death as a spy, he was hit by 17 bullets from a firing squad and still managed to remain alive, escaping to safety in Tunisia during the night. As Dumini returned to Italy, he was received with astonishment and offered yet another generous pension. He went into business as a transporter and bought a villa in a residential area of Florence.

With the 1943 fall of fascism in southern Italy, he joined the German-backed Italian Social Republic. After the Allied occupation of that region, Dumini was arrested in Bologna and placed on trial for Matteotti's murder: the judgement stated that the order to kill Matteotti was given to him by Mussolini. He was given a life sentence, which was immediately commuted to 30 years due to the Togliatti amnesty. He was released under a further amnesty in 1953 but was subsequently rearrested. He was finally released from Civitavecchia Penitentiary on 23 March 1956. In 1967, Dumini accidentally electrocuted himself while changing a lightbulb in his home. He died of a heart attack in a hospital nearly three weeks later.

== In popular culture ==
In the 1973 film The Assassination of Matteotti, by Florestano Vancini, Dumini is played by Umberto Orsini.

In the 2025 TV show Mussolini: Son of the Century, by Joe Wright, Dumini is played by Federico Majorana.
