= Antonio Scurati =

Italian writer and academic (born 1969)

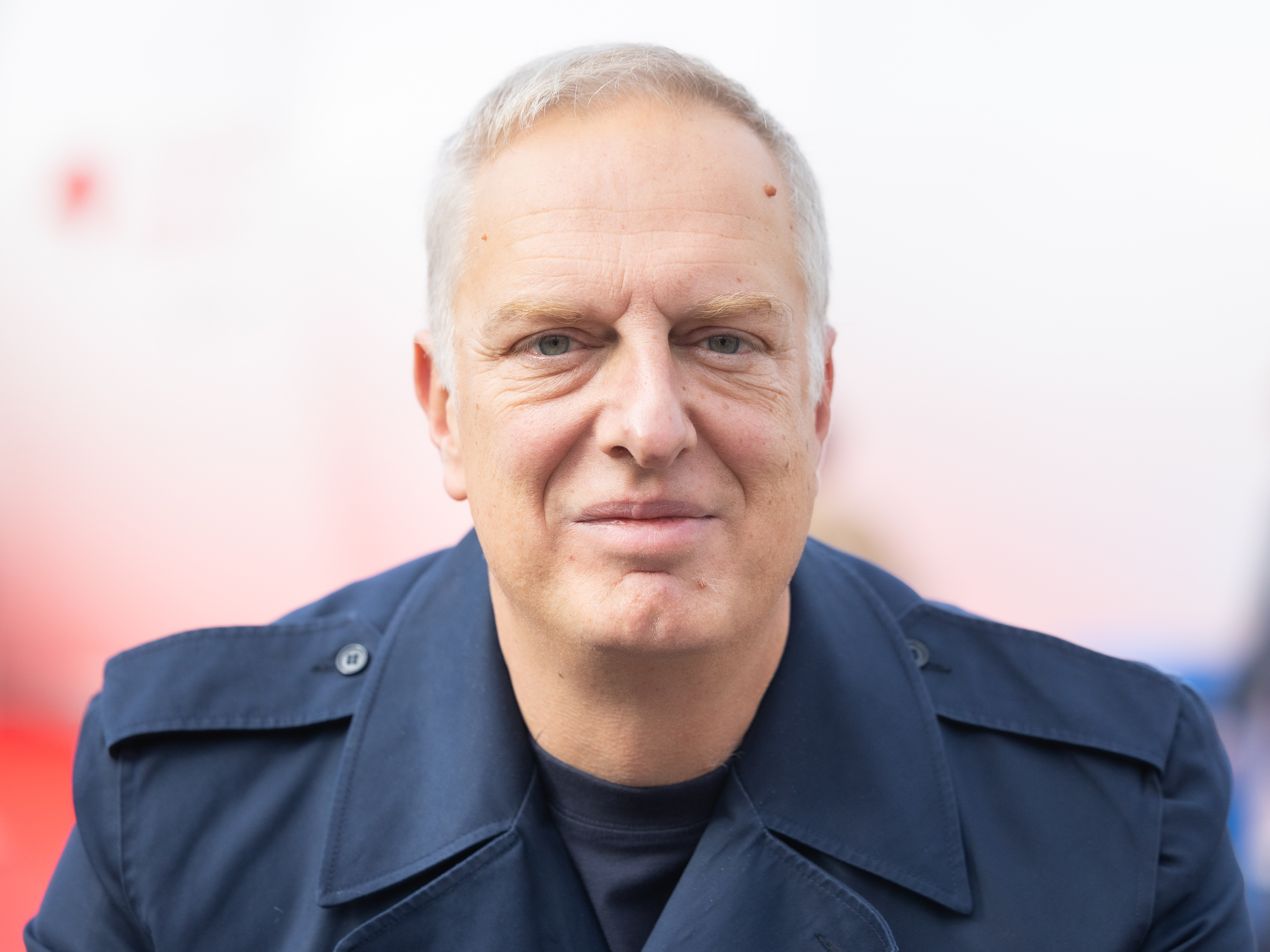
- Scurati in 2024
- Born: 25 June 1969 (age 57); Naples, Italy
- Education: University of Milan; School for Advanced Studies in the Social Sciences; University of Bergamo
- Occupations: Novelist; essayist; journalist; academic
- Writing career
- Language: Italian
- Years active: 2002–present
- Notable work: M: Son of the Century (2018)
- Notable awards: Premio Campiello (2005); Viareggio Prize (2015); Strega Prize (2019)
- Website: antonioscurati.com

Antonio Scurati (born 25 June 1969) is an Italian writer and academic. A professor of comparative literature and creative writing at the IULM University of Milan, mass media scholar and editorialist for the Corriere della Sera, Scurati has won the main Italian literary prizes. In 2019, he was awarded the prestigious Strega Prize for his novel M: Son of the Century (2018), the first volume in a series of five books dedicated to Benito Mussolini and Italian fascism. It was at the top of the charts for two consecutive years, was translated into over forty languages, and has been adapted into a television series.

== Early life and education ==
Scurati was born in Naples to a Neapolitan mother and a father from Cusano Milanino. He graduated with a degree in philosophy from the University of Milan. Scurati continued his studies at the School for Advanced Studies in the Social Sciences in Paris. He later completed a PhD in Theory and Text Analysis at the University of Bergamo. Scurati worked as a professore a contratto (contract professor) at Bergamo, where he coordinated a centre for studying the languages of war and violence. At Bergamo, he also taught the theory and elements of television language. In 2005, Scurati became a researcher in Cinema, Photography, and Television. In 2008, he moved to the IULM University of Milan, where he became an associate professor and conductor of a creative writing seminar and a seminar in orality and rhetoric, as well as co-director of the "Arts of the Story" writing master's course, together with film critic Gianni Canova, dedicated to epic and document-based narrative writing.

== Career ==
=== From early writings to collaboration with the Corriere della Sera ===
In 2003, Scurati published the essay Guerra. Narrazioni e culture nella tradizione occidentale, which was a finalist for the Viareggio Prize. His novel Il sopravvissuto (2005) was awarded (in a tie with Pino Roveredo) the 43rd Premio Campiello. (Note: See "Premio Campiello, opere premiate nelle precedenti edizioni". Premio Campiello (in Italian). 2011. Archived from the original on 28 February 2024. Updated through the years.) The novel was also awarded the Premio Nazionale Letterario Pisa for Fiction. (Note: See "Albo d'oro". Premio Nazionale Letterario Pisa (in Italian). 2019. Updated through the years.) In 2006, a revised edition of Scurati's debut novel, Il rumore sordo della battaglia, was published. That same year, Scurati published the essay "La letteratura dell'inesperienza. Scrivere romanzi al tempo della televisione", a reflection on media, Dadaism, literature, and humanism. Scurati's writing appeared in the weekly publication Internazionale and the daily newspaper La Stampa. In 2007, he published the historical novel Una storia romantica. In the same year, Scurati produced a documentary film for the Italian company Fandango. The film La stagione dell'amore investigates themes of love in contemporary Italian society, and continues the investigation conducted by director Pier Paolo Pasolini in his film Love Meetings (1965).

In 2009, Scurati published Il bambino che sognava la fine del mondo, a novel that mixes reality and fiction and is fierce criticism of mass media and the information economy as a whole. In 2010, Scurati published Gli anni che non stiamo vivendo. Il tempo della cronaca, a collection of articles on contemporary topics of crime, politics, and current affairs. In the same year, he addressed the same topics in the column "Lettere dal nord" within the television program Parla con me. In 2015, he published Il tempo migliore della nostra vita, a biographical novel dedicated to the life of Leone Ginzburg. It was awarded the Viareggio Prize, and was a finalist for the Premio Campiello. On 20 September 2019, it was announced that Scurati would begin writing a column for the Corriere della Sera. (Note: For the announcement, see Casati, Davide (20 September 2019). "Antonio Scurati e Giampaolo Pansa scriveranno per il Corriere della Sera". Corriere della Sera (in Italian). ISSN 2499-0485.) His first article, concerning euthanasia, appeared in the newspaper on 28 September 2019. (Note: For his full article, see Scurati, Antonio (28 September 2019). "Dico sì all'eutanasia: legale, libera e civile. E sono per la vita". Corriere della Sera (in Italian). ISSN 2499-0485.)

=== M pentalogy, TV series adaptation, and commentary ===
In September 2018, Scurati published the novel M: Son of the Century (M. Il figlio del secolo), the first volume in a series of five books about Benito Mussolini. The pentalogy intends to tell the history of Italy beginning on 23 March 1919, the day the Italian Fasces of Combat was founded, and ending in 1945. The novel concludes with Mussolini's speech to the Chamber of Deputies on 3 January 1925, which officially established Italy as a dictatorship following the political crisis caused by the murder of Giacomo Matteotti. The first edition of the novel contained eight historical errors (in names, dates, and quotations) that were detailed by Ernesto Galli della Loggia in the Corriere della Sera, where he criticized Scurati for having "retouched the history" with his novel. Scurati responded to the controversy in a column also published in the Corriere della Sera. In it, he argued that the current era requires "a cooperation between the rigor of historical accuracy and the art of the novel", and that "telling is an art, not an exact science". The controversy also involved Pierluigi Battista, to which Galli della Loggia wrote again, stating that "creative license does not authorizes betraying the truth of history". (Note: For the full timeline and discussion of the controversy, see: Galli della Loggia, Ernesto (13 October 2018). "'M' di Antonio Scurati: il romanzo che ritocca la storia". Corriere della Sera (in Italian). ISSN 2499-0485.; Scurati, Antonio (17 October 2018). "Scurati replica a Galli della Loggia: raccontare è arte, non scienza esatta Lo storico: la verità non va tradita". Corriere della Sera (in Italian). ISSN 2499-0485.; Galli della Loggia, Ernesto (17 October 2018). "Galli della Loggia a Scurati: la verità non va tradita". Corriere della Sera (in Italian). ISSN 2499-0485.; Battista, Pierluigi (21 October 2018). "La lezione di 'M' tra bellezza ed errori". Corriere della Sera (in Italian). ISSN 2499-0485.) In an interview to Il manifesto that was printed on 23 April 2019, Scurati stated that "giving a voice to Mussolini serves to free us from him", and added: "Above all it means dealing with the repressed collective conscience, fascism as one of the matrices of national identity and doing so through a new popular and inclusive narrative, according to the vocation of the novel form. I was driven by the belief that, after the historical fall of the anti-fascist prejudice, a novel about Mussolini was possible and, therefore, necessary precisely to renew the reasons for anti-fascism." (Note: For the full interview, see Caldiron, Guido (22 April 2019). "Antonio Scurati: 'Dare voce a Mussolini serve per liberarci di lui'". Il manifesto (in Italian). ISSN 0025-2158.)

On the night between 4 and 5 July 2019, M. Il figlio del secolo was awarded the prestigious Strega Prize, and Scurati commented: "I dedicate the victory to our grandfathers and fathers, who were first seduced and then oppressed by fascism, especially those among them who found the courage to fight it with weapons in hand. I would also like to dedicate the award to our children, with the hope that they will not have to go back to experiencing what we experienced a hundred years ago, especially to my daughter Lucia." The novel was a success, selling over 600,000 copies by April 2022, when it was being translated into more than 40 languages. The English translation by Anne Milano Appel was published by Harper on 5 April 2022. Also in 2022 it was announced that a production for a television series adaptation was under way, produced by Sky Original and directed by Joe Wright, with Luca Marinelli as Mussolini, and scheduled for release in 2024.

In September 2020, M. L'uomo della provvidenza, the second volume of the quartet was published. It follows the rise of Mussolini from 1925 to 1932, (Note: For a freely reproduced incipt, see Scurati, Antonio (16 September 2020). "Antonio Scurati e 'M. L'uomo della Provvidenza': nella tana del Duce malato". Corriere della Sera (in Italian). ISSN 2499-0485.) recounting his liberticidal politics and the fierce power struggles and ideological battles of the National Fascist Party. It is framed by the omnipresent figure of Mussolini and his mediocrities and eccentricities. The novel was translated into French in 2021, (Note: See "M, l'homme de la providence". Prix du Livre Européen (in French). 26 August 2021.) and was awarded the 2022 European Book Prize. In September 2022, the third volume of the series was released, M. Gli ultimi giorni dell'Europa, which follows the fateful years from 1938 to 1940 that would lead to Italy's entry into World War II. (Note: See "M. Gli ultimi giorni dell'Europa" (in Italian). Bompiani. 2022.) The series, initially planned as a trilogy, by 2022 was expanded as a tetralogy. In October 2022, Scurati commented: "At this point it is clear that I will need a fourth and perhaps a fifth to complete the story." In October 2023, about the TV series adaptation, Scurati commented: "It will have black comedy tones. But Mussolini is not a hero." About the making of the script, he said: "The book was successful, many politicians keep it on their bedside table. But in the writing of the screenplay there were moments of disagreement, even conflict." In October 2024, the fourth volume of the series was released, M. L'ora del destino. In April 2025, the fifth and final volume of the series was released, M. La fine e il principio.

After the results of the 2022 Italian general election showed that Brothers of Italy (FdI), a political party with roots dating back to the Italian Social Movement that was founded by neo-fascists and Mussolini's followers after World War II, was the most voted and largest party in the Italian Parliament, Scurati described FdI leader and future Italian prime minister Giorgia Meloni as an "heir of Mussolini". In an interview to Le Dauphiné Libéré, he had observed that "what is happening today in Italy is not a repetition of the past. But the resounding victory, in Italy, of a party that has its cultural and ideological roots in fascism is a fact. Italy is threatened by those parties that are the heirs of Mussolini not so much as fascisms, but as inventors of populism." For the 25 April celebrations (Liberation Day) of the Italian resistance movement to Nazi–fascism in 2024, Scurati was scheduled to deliver a monologue for the Italian public television RAI, warning that "the specter of fascism haunts the house of Italian democracy". (Note: Scurati's monologue discussed several events of Fascist Italy history and the political culture of neo-fascism. About the murder of Unitary Socialist Party leader Giacomo Matteotti, he said: "Giacomo Matteotti was murdered by fascist hitmen on 10 June 1924. Five of them waited for him outside his house, all squad members from Milan, professionals of violence hired by Benito Mussolini's closest collaborators. The Honourable Matteotti, the secretary of the Unitary Socialist Party, the last person in Parliament who still openly opposed the fascist dictatorship, was kidnapped in the centre of Rome, in broad daylight, in broad daylight. He fought until the end, as he had fought all his life. They stabbed him to death, then disfigured his body. They folded him on himself so they could stick him into a hole dug badly with a blacksmith's file." Scurati discussed Benito Mussolini's role in the murder, stating: "Mussolini was immediately informed. In addition to the crime, he was guilty of the infamy of swearing to the widow that he would do everything possible to bring her husband back to her. While he was swearing, the Duce of fascism kept the victim's bloody documents in his desk drawer." He also commented about the Nazi–fascist massacres in Italy, observing: "In this false spring of ours, however, we are not only commemorating Matteotti's political murder; the Nazi–fascist massacres perpetrated by the German SS, with the complicity and collaboration of the Italian fascists, in 1944 are also commemorated. Fosse Ardeatine, Sant'Anna di Stazzema, Marzabotto. These are just some of the places where Mussolini's demonic allies massacred thousands of defenseless Italian civilians in cold blood. Among them hundreds of children and even infants. Many were even burned alive, some beheaded." As part of his monologue, Scurati moved to discuss post-fascism in Italy, stating: "These two concomitant mournful anniversaries – spring of 1924, spring of 1944 – proclaim that fascism has been throughout its entire historical existence—not only at the end or occasionally—an irredeemable phenomenon of systematic political violence, murder, and massacre. Will the heirs of that story recognize him once and for all? Unfortunately, everything suggests that this will not be the case. The post-fascist ruling group, having won the elections in October 2022, had two paths before it: repudiate its neo-fascist past or try to rewrite history. They have undoubtedly taken the second path." Scurati then discussed the incumbent Italian prime minister Giorgia Meloni's role in neo-fascist political culture and her lack of anti-fascist commitments, such as never stating to be anti-fascist, commenting: "After having avoided the topic during the electoral campaign, the Prime Minister, when forced to address it by historical anniversaries, obstinately stuck to the ideological line of her neo-fascist culture of origin: she distanced herself from the indefensible brutalities perpetrated by the regime (the persecution of the Jews) without ever repudiating the fascist experience as a whole, she blamed the massacres carried out with the complicity of the Republican fascists on the Nazis alone, and finally she ignored the fundamental role of the Resistance in the Italian rebirth (to the point of never mentioning the word 'anti-fascism' on the occasion of 25 April 2023)." Scurati's monologue concluded with a warning about the state of Italian democracy, arguing: "As I speak to you, we are once again on the eve of the anniversary of the Liberation from Nazi–fascism. The word that the Prime Minister refused to pronounce will still throb on the grateful lips of all sincere democrats, be they left, centre, or right. Until that word – anti-fascism – is pronounced by those who govern us, the specter of fascism will continue to haunt the house of Italian democracy.") He was subsequently removed from the Rai 3 programme Chesarà... hosted by Serena Bertone, who criticized the government's choice and said no explanation was given. (Note: Giorgia Meloni commented: "RAI responds that it simply refused to pay €1,800 (the monthly salary of many employees) for a minute of monologue." The parliamentary supervisory commission described it as "a very serious case of violation of editorial autonomy". Serena Bertone read the text Scurati's monologue at the beginning of the broadcast, explaining that Scurati had given his support for her to read it.) This prompted criticism from parts of the Italian press, which published his monologue, and outcry from the opposition, as well as censorship accusations, which were denied by the Meloni government and RAI. (Note: This was not the first time that the Meloni government had engaged in censorship, or had been accused in doing so as part of a right-wing cancel culture, such as with Peppa Pig. For instance, Roberto Saviano commented: "What did you expect? They're controlling everything." For the first time, Mediaset surpassed the public broadcaster RAI, and public television in Italy under Meloni was described by critics and part of the Italian press as "TeleRegime" and "TeleMeloni". The intervention of the government in the mass media in Italy was also observed and reported by the international press, including among others Le Figaro, The Guardian, Libération, Le Monde, El País, and The Times. See: Giuffrida, Angela (23 May 2023). "Italian government accused of exerting 'ruthless' influence at state broadcaster". The Guardian. ISSN 0261-3077.; Giuffrida, Angela (17 April 2024). "Meloni 'turning Italian broadcaster into megaphone for far right'". The Guardian. ISSN 0261-3077.; Vitale, Giovanna (17 April 2024). "Rai, il cda ammette il sorpasso di Mediaset. La fuga delle star spaventa la tv pubblica". La Repubblica (in Italian). ISSN 2499-0817.; Segond, Valerie (18 April 2024). "En Italie, l'emprise croissante du gouvernement sur les médias". Le Figaro (in French). ISSN 1638-606X.; Lobardo, Ilario (18 April 2024). "L'imbarazzo di Meloni su Agi e par condicio: 'Non si parli di deriva'". La Stampa (in Italian). ISSN 1122-1763.; Vitale, Giovanna (19 April 2024). "'Cresce la presa di Meloni sui media'. Anche Le Figaro lancia l'allarme sul governo italiano". La Repubblica (in Italian). ISSN 2499-0817.) In a letter published by La Repubblica, Scurati responded to Meloni, who had published his monologue, describing it as violence: "Questa, gentile Presidente, è una violenza. Non fisica, certo, ma pur sempre una violenza. È questo il prezzo che si deve pagare oggi nella sua Italia per aver espresso il proprio pensiero?" ("This, dear President, is violence. Not physical, of course, but nevertheless violence. Is this the price that must be paid today in your Italy for expressing one's thoughts?") (Note: For the letter in full, see Scurati, Antonio (20 April 2020). "Scurati risponde a Meloni dopo la censura della Rai: 'L'attacco personale è una violenza. Chi esprime un pensiero deve pagare un prezzo?'". La Repubblica (in Italian). ISSN 2499-0817.)

== Personal life ==
Scurati grew up in Venice and lives in Milan, although he remains tied to Naples. (Note: About Naples and his move to Milan, Scurati said: "Naples is like a mother to me. And also the love of youth. I would have liked to go to university there. With a friend I had queued in front of the offices in via Mezzocannone to sign up. But my parents said no and I went to Milan. Right choice because Milan is the ideal wife. I remain attached to Naples because my parents met there: father, manager of Rinascente, from Cusano Milanino, Neapolitan mother from Porta San Gennaro, sales assistant for the same chain of shops." See also Scurati, Antonio (28 May 2020). "Nord, Sud, tutti insieme". Corriere della Sera (in Italian). ISSN 2499-0485 – via PressReader.) Scurati is an honorary citizen of Ravello, where he spent every summer since he was a child; he played with his friends and had discussions with Gore Vidal, among many others. As told in a 2021 interview to La Gazzetta dello Sport, it was thanks to his father that Scurati became a supporter of Juventus, with the likes of Michel Platini and Zinedine Zidane, whose transfer in 2001 made him lose his support for the club. (Note: Scurati said: "My dad passed on his Juventus support to me. And as kids we do little crazy things. Like when in Campo San Lorenzo we set up a tent with my friends to watch the 1983 Champions Cup final with Hamburg on TV together. It was raining and we risked being electrocuted by the electrical wires hanging from the building, while Magath marked our disappointment. That support then vanished when Juve let Zidane leave. I have always been fascinated, like Platini before, by these talented players who make their gestures epic.") In the same 2021 interview to La Gazzetta dello Sport, about former Napoli SSC footballer Diego Maradona, who died in 2020, he said: "Plus ultra on the pitch. Diego brought great joy, a man who became a myth like Hercules or Achilles. Superhuman and subhuman. However, a city that feeds on myths is destined for the worst. After all, the mythological message leaves man enchanted to destroy him. It makes me angry to see Naples like this, with all its contradictions. But it is love's anger."

== Works ==
=== Novels ===
- — (2002). Il rumore sordo della battaglia. Collana Scrittori italiani e stranieri (in Italian). Milan: Mondadori. ISBN 978-88-045-0064-3.
  - — (2006). Il rumore sordo della battaglia (in Italian) (revised ed.). Milan: Bompiani. ISBN 978-88-4525-634-9.
- — (2005). Il sopravvissuto (in Italian). Milan: Bompiani. ISBN 978-88-4523-385-2.
- — (2007). Una storia romantica. Collana Narratori italiani (in Italian). Milan: Bompiani. ISBN 978-88-452-5962-3.
- — (2009). Il bambino che sognava la fine del mondo. Collana Narratori italiani (in Italian). Milan: Bompiani. ISBN 978-88-452-6241-8.
- — (2011). La seconda mezzanotte. Collana Narratori italiani (in Italian). Milan: Bompiani. ISBN 978-88-4526-775-8.
- — (2013). Il padre infedele. Collana Narratori italiani (in Italian). Milan: Bompiani. ISBN 978-88-4527-409-1.
- — (2015). Il tempo migliore della nostra vita. Collana Narratori italiani (in Italian). Milan: Bompiani. ISBN 978-88-4527-913-3.
- — (2018). M. Il figlio del secolo. Collana Narratori italiani (in Italian). Milano: Bompiani. ISBN 978-88-4529-813-4.
  - — (2022). M: Son of the Century. Translated by Appel, Anne Milano. New York: Harper. ISBN 978-0-06-295611-8.
- — (2020). M. L'uomo della provvidenza. Collana Narratori italiani (in Italian). Milan-Florence: Bompiani. ISBN 978-88-301-0265-1.
- — (2022). M. Gli ultimi giorni dell'Europa. Collana Narratori italiani (in Italian). Milan-Florence: Bompiani. ISBN 978-88-301-0496-9.
- — (2024). M. L'ora del destino. Collana Narratori italiani (in Italian). Milan-Florence: Bompiani. ISBN 978-88-301-0497-6.
- — (2025). M. La fine e il principio. Collana Narratori italiani (in Italian). Milan-Florence: Bompiani. ISBN 978-88-604-4170-6.

=== Essays ===
- — (2003). Guerra. Narrazioni e culture nella tradizione occidentale. Collana Saggi (in Italian). Rome: Donzelli. ISBN 978-88-7989-776-1.
  - — (2007). Guerra. Narrazioni e culture nella tradizione occidentale (in Italian) (revised ed.). Rome: Donzelli. ISBN 978-88-603-6188-2.
- — (2003). Televisioni di guerra. Il conflitto del Golfo come evento mediatico e il paradosso dello spettatore totale. Collana Culture (in Italian). Verona: Ombre Corte. ISBN 978-88-8700-938-5.
- — (2006). La letteratura dell'inesperienza. Scrivere romanzi al tempo della televisione. Collana Saggi n.350 (in Italian). Milan: Bompiani. ISBN 978-88-4525-743-8.
- — (2010). Gli anni che non stiamo vivendo. Il tempo della cronaca. Collana Overlook (in Italian). Milan: Bompiani. ISBN 978-88-452-6456-6.
- — (2012). Letteratura e sopravvivenza. La retorica letteraria di fronte alla violenza. Collana Studi (in Italian). Milan: Bompiani. ISBN 978-88-4527-104-5.
- — (2016). Dal tragico all'osceno. Raccontare la morte nel XXI secolo. Collana grandi tascabili. Agone (in Italian). Milan: Bompiani. ISBN 978-88-452-8187-7.

=== Documentary ===
- Scurati, Antonio; Scurati, Lorenzo (2010). La stagione dell'amore (DVD with book) (in Italian). Rome: Fandango. ISBN 978-88-604-4170-6.
