= Akelo =

Italian goldsmith, designer, and sculptor

Andrea Cagnetti, also known as Akelo, (born 16 March 1967 in Corchiano, Viterbo) is an Italian artist. Goldsmith, designer, and sculptor. he is known for his use of ancient techniques used in metalworking.

== Biography ==
Akelo obtained a diploma at the Ronciglione state secondary school with a concentration in scientific studies. He then transferred to Rome, where he worked as a graphic artist for several years. At the same time, he studied about ancient goldsmithing, metallurgy, and alchemy. Akelo combined this theoretical understanding with his experimentation on materials and techniques, in order to create gold objects and other sculptural objects made from bronze, and iron. He uses the artistic name of Akelo (from Achelous, Greek god of the waters).

In 2010, Akelo created the bronze sculpture "Hope" for the Robert Bresson Prize, which is given every year at the Venice Film Festival. He currently lives in Corchiano, where he also writes scientific articles on the techniques used in goldsmithing.

== Works in public collections ==
- HOEDUS II (1996) Pendant – Newark Museum
- YILDUN (2001) Pendant – Museum of Art and Archaeology, University of Missouri
- CHORT (2002) Pendant – Museum of Fine Arts, Boston
- DENHEB (2004) Necklace – Museum of Art and Archaeology, University of Missouri
- SEGIN (2009) Pyx – Museum of Fine Arts, Boston
- STRANGE MECHANISM No. 3 (2010) Sculpture – Museum of Art and Archaeology, University of Missouri

== Bibliography ==
- "Akelo: Golden Works 1994–2000" – G. Spinola/P. d’Ambrosio – Saatchi & Saatchi/Lupetti Editore (2004) ISBN 978-88-8391-107-1
- "Etruschi, scoperto il segreto dei loro gioielli" – Corriere della sera (2000) –
- "I segreti degli ori Etruschi" Youtube.com "I segreti degli ori Etruschi" (italian) – (2000) "Ulisse, Il piacere della scoperta – Sulle tracce degli Etruschi" di Piero ed Alberto Angela (RAI 3)
- "Der Schmuck der Etrusker" Youtube.com "Der Schmuck der Etrusker" (german) – (2003) Abenteuer Erde" (HR – Hessischer Rundfunk)
- "Experimental survey on fluid brazing in ancient goldsmith's art" – International Journal of Material Research (2009) doi:10.3139/146.101783
- "The Voyage of a Contemporary Italian Goldsmith in the Classical World: Golden Treasures of Akelo” – Mary Pixley – Museum of Art and Archaeology, University of Missouri (2010) ISBN 978-0-910501-40-8
- "Gioiello Italiano Contemporaneo" – Skyra – Rizzoli International (2007)
- "Akelo's Treasures – An Exhibition Celebrating 25 Years of a Roman Master Goldsmith" – Bentley & Skinner, London (2011)
- "Materia Nova" – Galerie Ludwig Trossaert, Contemporary art (2012) ISBN 978-94-91314-12-4 – D/2012/12.184/07
- "Metodo sperimentale per la realizzazione di un paio di orecchini finemente decorati con granulazione al pulviscolo e filigrana" – Il Covile (Italy, 2013)

== Main exhibitions ==
- "Materia Nova" – Galerie Ludwig Trossaert, Contemporary art – Antwerp, Belgium (18 May – 6 June 2012)
- "Collecting for a New Century: Recent Acquisition" – Museum of Art And Archaeology, University of Missouri – Columbia, MO – U.S.A (28 January – 13 May 2012)
- "Akelo's Treasures. An Exhibition Celebrating Twenty-Five Years of a Roman Master Goldsmith" – Bentley & Skinner (Bond Street Jewellers) Ltd – London – U.K. (November 2011)
- ”Golden Treasures by Akelo” – Museum of the Gemological Institute of America – Carlsbad, California, U.S.A. (October 2010 – March 2011)
- "The Voyage of a Contemporary Italian Goldsmith in the Classical World: Golden Treasures by Akelo" – Museum of Art And Archaeology, University of Missouri – Columbia, MO – U.S.A (5 June – 26 September 2010)
- "Gioiello Italiano Contemporaneo" – Castello Sforzesco, Milano / Palazzo Valmarana Braga, Vicenza / Kunstgewerbemuseum, Berlin / Museo di arti decorative Pietro Accorsi, Torino (January 2008 – January 2009)
- "In Its Time: Materials and Techniques Throughout Jewelry History" – Aaron Faber Gallery – New York CityA. (2009)
- "Akelo: risplende l'oro degli Etruschi" – Vicenzaoro2, Fiera di Vicenza – Vicenza, Italy (June 2005)
- "The Hanover World Exposition 2000" – Italian Pavillon – Hanover, Germany (June – October 2000)

== Television appearances ==
- "Sulle tracce degli Etruschi" – Ulisse, il piacere della scoperta – RAI 3 (Italy)
- "I tesori del Vaticano" – Ulisse, il piacere della scoperta – RAI 3 (Italy)
- "Le meraviglie del British Museum" – Ulisse, il piacere della scoperta – RAI 3 (Italy)
- "Der Schmuck der Etrusker" – Abenteuer Erde – HR Hessischer Rundfunk (Germany)
- "Unomattina" – RAI 1 (Italy)
- "Taccuino Italiano" – RAI International (Italy)
- "Destinos" – CNN en espanol
- "Mediterraneo" – RAI 2 (Italy) – FRANCE 3 (France) – CANAL ALGERIE (Algeria) – ERT/ET 1 (Greece)
- "Style" – MBC (Middle East)
