= M. Son of the Century =

2018 novel by Antonio Scurati

M: Son of the Century
- First edition cover
- Author: Antonio Scurati
- Original title: M. Il figlio del secolo
- Translator: Anne Milano Appel
- Language: Italian
- Series: M pentalogy
- Release number: 1
- Genre: Historical novel
- Set in: Italy, 1919–1925
- Publisher: Bompiani
- Publication date: 12 September 2018
- Publication place: Italy
- English publication date: 5 April 2022
- Media type: Print (paperback)
- Pages: 839
- Awards: Strega Prize (2019)
- ISBN: 978-88-452-9813-4
- OCLC: 1053971231
- Dewey Decimal: 853.92
- LC Class: PQ4919.C87 M2 2018
- Followed by: M. L'uomo della provvidenza

M: Son of the Century (Italian: M. Il figlio del secolo) is a 2018 historical novel by Antonio Scurati. It is the first novel in a pentalogy recounting the rise of Italian dictator Benito Mussolini. It was a bestseller and was awarded the prestigious Strega Prize.

== Summary ==
M: Son of the Century is the first volume in a series of five books about Benito Mussolini. The series intends to tell the history of Italy beginning on 23 March 1919, the day the Italian Fasces of Combat was founded, and ending in 1945. M: Son of the Century concludes with Mussolini's speech to the Chamber of Deputies on 3 January 1925, which officially established Italy as a dictatorship following the political crisis caused by the murder of Giacomo Matteotti.

Per the novel's copyright page, in the narrative "every single event, character, dialogue, discourse . . . has been historically documented and/or authoritatively witnessed by more than one source." Most chapters are supplemented with excerpts from contemporary documents and sources. For this reason, Scurati has defined the work as a "documentary novel". The citations serve the purpose of rehashing events the author had just rendered fictionally. Scurati actively blurs the boundary between history and fiction throughout the novel. With M, Scurati intends to "bring fascism down to earth, giving real knowledge of it as only literature knows how, when it delves into the details of material life".

The novel is narrated primarily by an omniscient third-person narrator who periodically shifts into a first-person speaker—Mussolini himself.

== Publication ==
The novel was first published by Bompiani on 12 September 2018.

The first edition of the novel contained historical errors which were detailed by Ernesto Galli della Loggia in the Corriere della Sera. Scurati responded to the controversy in a column also published in the Corriere della Sera. In it, he argued that the current era requires "a cooperation between the rigor of historical accuracy and the art of the novel".

The novel has been translated for publication in 46 countries.

== Reception ==
The novel was a success, selling over 600,000 copies.

On the night between 4 and 5 July 2019, M: Son of the Century was awarded the prestigious Strega Prize. Scurati dedicated the award to those who fought against fascism.

The English translation by Anne Milano Appel was published by Harper on 5 April 2022. Sam Sacks of The Wall Street Journal wrote, "Readers will find themselves swept up by the story, thrilled by its conflicts and strangely forgetful that its 'hero' is a murderous despot. It's a dangerous lesson for a novel to convey, but a profoundly important one." Publishers Weekly praised the "magisterial prose, adeptly translated by Appel". In a mixed review, The Washington Post's Wendy Smith wrote, "European critics who noted that M was not precisely a novel had a point. Virtually every narrative chapter is followed by excerpts from period documents that mostly repeat the material laid out. This bumpy mix of fact and sort-of-fiction kills the book's momentum and makes it much longer than it needs to be." The book was also reviewed by The Atlantic, which praised its lessons as poignant.

== Adaptations ==
=== Television adaptation ===
The novel has been adapted into an eight-part drama series. It features Luca Marinelli in the lead role of Mussolini. British filmmaker Joe Wright directed, while Stefano Bises and Davide Serino adapted the script. Filming began in October 2022 at Rome's Cinecittà studios. The series is produced by Sky Studios and Lorenzo Mieli's The Apartment Pictures, in collaboration with France's Pathé. The series was screened at the 81st Venice International Film Festival on 5 September 2024 and began airing on Sky Atlantic on 10 January 2025.

=== Stage adaptation ===
A stage adaptation was created by Massimo Popolizio, in collaboration with Lorenzo Pavolini, and interpreted by Popolizio himself with Tommaso Ragno. The play was produced by Piccolo Teatro di Milano-Teatro d'Europa, Teatro di Roma, and Istituto Luce Cinecittà, in collaboration with Centro Teatrale Santacristina.

Cast

- Massimo Popolizio
- Tommaso Ragno
- Riccardo Bocci
- Gabriele Brunelli
- Tommaso Cardarelli
- Michele Dell'Utri
- Giulia Heatfield Di Renzi
- Raffaele Esposito
- Flavio Francucci
- Francesco Giordano,
- Diana Manea
- Paolo Musio
- Michele Nani
- Alberto Onofrietti
- Francesca Osso
- Antonio Perretta
- Sandra Toffolatti
- Beatrice Verzotti

The theatre performance was recorded and broadcast by Rai 5 on 30 October 2022, directed by Marco Odetto.
