= Cinematografo =

- Editor: Davide Milani
- Categories: Film magazine
- Frequency: Monthly
- Circulation: 50,000
- Country: Italy
- Language: Italian
- ISSN: 1827-5184

Cinematografo, formerly known as Rivista del cinematografo, is an Italian film magazine founded in 1928. One of the earliest Italian publications devoted to cinema, it is the oldest such magazine still in publication in Italy. Since 2000, it has presented the Robert Bresson Prize annually at the Venice Film Festival, and since 2005 it has presented its own film awards, the Cinematografo Awards.

== History ==
The magazine was founded in 1928. In 1937, the monthly was acquired by the Centro cattolico cinematografico (Catholic Film Centre), which decided to broaden its readership from cinema exhibitors to a wider audience. Towards the end of 1942, repeated changes in the magazine's editorial approach led to the suspension of publication, while in 1943 some issues were reduced to only four pages. Publication resumed in October 1945, after a two-year interruption caused by the war, and from 1946 the magazine was edited by Luigi Gedda. During the 1950s, it was expanded and redesigned, with an increase both in the number of pages and in the scope of its cultural coverage. Regular contributors included Mario Verdone, Gian Luigi Rondi, Paolo di Valmarana, and Ugo Sciascia.

During the 1960s, the magazine broadened its coverage to include films from Communist countries and more unconventional and experimental cinema, including the work of Pier Paolo Pasolini. In the 1980s, under editor Sergio Trasatti, the magazine moved away from its previous identity as a periodical closely associated with the Catholic world. It began targeting newsstand sales and a broader readership. Its structure was also reorganised: cinema was covered primarily in the first section, while the remainder of the magazine expanded its attention to theatre, television, radio, and dance.

During the 1990s, the magazine returned to a stronger focus on cinema and television, while also taking an interest in information technology, launching the website Cinematografo.it and expanding its coverage of home video. Topics covered during this period included special features on television and religion and on cinema and the Mafia, as well as investigations into cinema and politics and violence on screen. From 1994, the magazine collaborated with the Venice Biennale in providing Internet coverage of the Venice Film Festival. In the summer of 1996, Rivista del cinematografo introduced a new graphic design, and from October 1997 it was published entirely in colour. Since 2000, it has presented the Robert Bresson Prize annually at the Venice Film Festival.

From 2004 to September 2013, the magazine was edited by Dario Edoardo Viganò, who was also president of the Fondazione Ente dello Spettacolo. From October 2013 to November 2016, it was edited by Ivan Maffeis, who likewise served as president of the Fondazione Ente dello Spettacolo. In September 2015, Davide Milani became editor of the Rivista; he also served as president of the Fondazione Ente dello Spettacolo. In 2022, following its digital transformation, the magazine was renamed Cinematografo.

== Content ==
The magazine publishes articles, interviews, reviews, and in-depth features on films, television series, and professionals in the film industry, as well as actors, entertainment personalities, artists, and musicians who compose film soundtracks.

=== CineDataBase ===
The magazine's website includes CineDataBase, originally known as the Banca dati del cinema mondiale ("World Cinema Database"), which was founded in 1934. It contains film entries and biographies of actors and film professionals, covering cinema from 1895 onwards.

== Cinematografo Awards ==
The Cinematografo Awards are awards presented to figures from the worlds of cinema, television series, and culture by the journalists and critics of Rivista del Cinematografo. The awards were established in 2005 under the name RdC Awards. From 2006 to 2020, they were presented as part of the Tertio Millennio Film Fest. Since 2021, they have been presented as an independent event under the name Cinematografo Awards.

=== Categories ===
- Special Award for Lifetime Achievement
- Navicella Award for Italian Cinema
- Navicella Award for Television Series
- Revelation of the Year Award
- Breakthrough Film Award
- Best Soundtrack Award
- Best Actor Award
- Best Actress Award
- Best First Feature Award
- Diego Fabbri Award for Best Book on Cinema
