= Robert Bresson Prize =

The Robert Bresson Prize is a recognition offered during the Venice Film Festival to the director who, according to the Pontifical Councils for Culture and for Social Communications of the Vatican, "has given a testimony, significant for sincerity and intensity, of the difficult passage in search of spiritual meaning in our lives".

In 2010, on the occasion of the 11th edition of the Prize, a special piece of art has been realized. The title of the work is "HOPE" and was made by the artist Akelo (Andrea Cagnetti).

== Previous editions ==
- 2000 – Giuseppe Tornatore
- 2001 – Manoel de Oliveira
- 2002 – Theo Angelopoulos
- 2003 – Krzysztof Zanussi
- 2004 – Wim Wenders
- 2005 – Jerzy Stuhr
- 2006 – Zhang Yuan
- 2007 – Alexander Sokurov
- 2008 – Daniel Burman
- 2009 – Walter Salles
- 2010 – Mahamat Saleh Haroun
- 2011 – Dardenne brothers
- 2012 – Ken Loach
- 2013 – Amos Gitai
- 2014 – Carlo Verdone
- 2015 – Mohsen Makhmalbaf

- 2022 – Hirokazu Koreeda

== See also ==
- Robert Bresson
