= Adolfo Dumini =

Italian painter

Adolfo Dumini or Duminy (born 11 May 1863) was an Italian painter active in Florence. He was the son of the painter Leopoldo Dumini. He painted mainly genre subjects. He also marketed antiquities and copied classic masterpieces. He emigrated to United States, but returned to Italy during World War I. His son, Amerigo Dumini, born in 1896 in St Louis, Missouri, was a paramilitary for the fascist regime of Mussolini, responsible for the 1924 assassination of Unitary Socialist Party leader Giacomo Matteotti.
