= Cross-class alliance =

Concept in Trotskyist political theory

A cross-class alliance is a term for an organisation that bypasses social-economic classes in pursuit of its aim. It is often used by Trotskyists as a term of abuse towards popular fronts as they prefer working class united fronts, however some also accuse some supposed united fronts as being cross class alliances.
