= Mauro Del Giudice =

Italian magistrate and writer (1857–1951)

Mauro Del Giudice (20 May 1857, in Rodi Garganico – 14 February 1951, in Rome) was an Italian magistrate, jurist and writer.

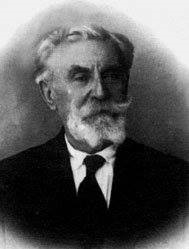
Mauro Del Giudice

== Biography ==
Born in the province of Foggia, "to an honest and wealthy family of the lower middle class, who had based his social ascent on the flourishing citrus trade (...) he had followed his classical studies at the seminary of Molfetta, province of Bari". He then arrived in Naples where he studied law, among other things with Luigi Zuppetta and other eminent jurists.

In 1888 he ranked first in the competition for judge and thus began a magisterial career that took him to numerous judicial offices in Southern Italy: after about thirty years of esteemed activity, he came to lead the important prosecution section at the Court of appeal from Rome.

During the period of Fascism he was a great supporter of the independence of magistrates. In 1924, together with judge Umberto Tancredi, he was charged with the investigation into the murder of Giacomo Matteotti. Convinced of the guilt of the regime, he showed great tenacity in resisting bribes and external pressures during the conduct of the trial.

However, this intransigence cost him his job, probably by a direct involvement of Mussolini, through a promotion that forced him to leave his office in Rome for Catania. Later, he was forcibly retired, and moved to Vieste with his brother Luigi.

In the Florestano Vancini's film The Assassination of Matteotti (1973), Del Giudice is played by Vittorio De Sica.

== Bibliography ==
- DEL GIUDICE MAURO, La legge penale nel tempo: tesi di diritto penale comparato, Tipografia del Commercio, Naples 1882.
- DEL GIUDICE MAURO, Il fenomeno giuridico nella scienza sociale: introduzione allo studio della filosofia del diritto, Tipografia italiana, Rome 1908.
- DEL GIUDICE MAURO, La Scuola Storica Italiana del Diritto i suoi fondatori, Colitti, Campobasso 1918.
- DEL GIUDICE MAURO, Germanicae res, Colitti, Campobasso 1918.
- DEL GIUDICE MAURO, Problemi di ieri… e di domani, Tipografia Italiana, Rome 1918.
- DEL GIUDICE MAURO, Finalità e funzione della giustizia popolare in corte d’assise, Colitti, Campobasso 1923.
- DEL GIUDICE MAURO, Pietro Giannone nella storia del diritto e nella filosofia della storia (Conference of 1921), in “Studio giuridico napoletano”, vol. 12 (1925), pt. 2, pp. 6–44. Il saggio è stato ripubblicato da Mario Simone nei Quaderni di Capitanata, Amministrazione provinciale di Capitanata, Foggia 1974.
- DEL GIUDICE MAURO, Il potere giudiziario al cospetto del nuovo parlamento, Catania, Edizioni del Corriere di Sicilia, 1948
- DEL GIUDICE MAURO, Cronistoria del processo Matteotti; A. Scabelloni e S. Migliorino;
- FILIPPO TURATI, L’epicedio, Lo Monaco, Palermo 1954, Opere nuove, Rome 1985.
- DI TIZIO LUCIANO, La giustizia negata. Dietro le quinte del processo Matteotti, introduction by Ottaviano Del Turco, Ianieri Edizioni, 2006.
- BENEGIANO MARCELLO, A scelta del Duce: il processo Matteotti a Chieti, Texus, L’Aquila 2006

=== Unpublished sources ===
- The Central State Archives of Rome retains in the fund of the Rome Corte d'Assise all documentation of the investigation against the accused of Matteotti murder.

=== Filmography ===
- The Assassination of Matteotti ("Il delitto Matteotti"), 1973, directed by Florestano Vancini.
