= Albino Volpi =

Fascist politician (1889–1939)

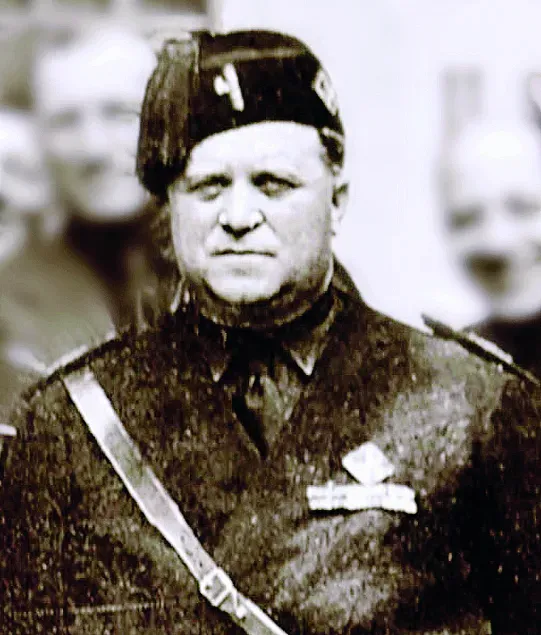
- Volpi c.1930's in a Blackshirt uniform
- Born: 21 September 1889; Lodi, Lombardy, Kingdom of Italy
- Died: 7 August 1939 (aged 49); Milan, Kingdom of Italy
- Burial place: Cimitero Maggiore di Milano
- Military career
- Allegiance: Kingdom of Italy
- Branch: Regia Marina (1914–1918)
- Unit: Caimani del Piave
- Conflicts: World War I: Italian Front

Albino Volpi (Lodi, 21 September 1889 – 7 August 1939), was an Italian criminal, soldier, paramilitary leader, and political figure of Squadrism and Fascism in Italy. As a member of the Sansepolcrismo, Volpi was one of the founding members of the Fasci Italiani di Combattimento, the predecessor of Benito Mussolini's National Fascist Party.

== Early life and military career ==
Volpi was born in Lodi, Lombardy on 21 September 1889, before joining the military Volpi worked as a carpenter and had an arrest record for theft. During World War I Volpi volunteered for service in the Caimani del Piave (Caimans of the Piave) following the Battle of Caporetto which later formed the backbone of the 1st San Marco Regiment of the Italian Navy. The Caimani del Piave was a naval infantry force made up of volunteers who performed reconnaissance, sabotage, and collecting military intelligence while fighting on the Piave front during the First Battle of the Piave River and the Second Battle of the Piave River.

== Squadrismo movement and politics ==
Following his military service, Volpi was heavily involved in the Squadrismo movement, specifically the National Federation of Italian Arditi (Federazione Nazionale degli Arditi d'Italia) or FNAI following the First World War. The Squadrismo movement was an Italian political paramilitary movement consisting of anti-Communists and anti-Socialists which often clashed with the Italian far-left and anti-fascist factions during Fascist and anti-Fascist violence in Italy from 1919 to 1926.

On 15 April 1919 Volpi was involved in a coordinated attack on the Lombardy Avanti! newspaper headquarters. Volpi was also involved in several disturbances including slapping Socialist politicians, cutting off the beard of Giacinto Menotti Serrati, and shooting at windows which displayed the flag of the Italian Communist Party. Later on 17 November 1919 Volpi was involved in the bombing of a socialist gathering along the Via San Damiano celebrating their recent victory in the 1919 Italian general election. Volpi was later responsible for the death of Giuseppe Inversetti, a notable Italian socialist and mechanical worker when Volpi and other Squadristi members attacked a Socialist club in Foro Bonaparte in Milan.

As a founding member of the Sansepolcrismo Volpi was an early supporter of Benito Mussolini and was later a founding member of the Fasci Italiani di Combattimento, later the National Fascist Party.

== Involvement in the assassination of Giacomo Matteotti ==
Volpi was later involved in the assassination of Giacomo Matteotti, a notable critic and opposer of Mussolini in the Chamber of Deputies, as well as the secretary of the opposition Unitary Socialist Party. Matteotti was kidnapped on 10 June 1924 in Rome by Volpi, Amerigo Dumini, Giuseppe Viola, Augusto Malacria, Ameleto Poveromo, and other members of Mussolini's political secret police and taken to the outskirts of Rome where he was killed and hastily buried in an unmarked grave. Dumini and Volpi were both chosen by Mussolini due to their longstanding loyalty. Italian historian Mauro Canali argues that it was Volpi who was ultimately responsible for assassinating Matteotti. The assassination of Matteotti according to Canali marks the end of Mussolini's so-called "legalistic" period of governance. Following Matteotti's assassination, Mussolini's power as the Prime Minister of Italy combined with his role as Duce of Italy became solidified into a dictatorship which would last until July 25, 1943, when Mussolini was officially dismissed from his position as Prime Minister by Victor Emmanuel III.

== In popular culture ==
Volpi is depicted by Italian actor Federico Mainardi in Joe Wright's biographical historical drama series Mussolini: Son of the Century (2025).
