= Delta Padano =

- Release date: 1951
- Country: Italy
- Language: Italian

Delta Padano is a 1951 Italian film.
