= Intransigent fascism =

Minority current of Italian Fascism

Intransigent fascism or revolutionary fascism, in some respects analogous to so-called left-wing fascism, is a minority current of Italian fascism that, drawing on the integrity of the San Sepolcro Programme and the movement before the March on Rome, departed from the PNF (of which dissident members founded the National Fasces) and from the experience of the twenty-year period, during which in fact fascism was a reactionary regime of the extreme right, compromised with the Catholic Church, the Monarchy and conservative political forces, because of the common opposition to 'materialist' Marxism and individualist liberalism.

The typical ideas of this line of thought, which never gained much support except among a few early Fascist exponents such as the Freemason Roberto Farinacci or the Neapolitan revolutionary syndicalist Aurelio Padovani (expelled and readmitted to the party, who later died under circumstances never fully clarified), and was all in all ignored by Benito Mussolini himself, are: national socialism, revolutionary syndicalism, republicanism, futurism, thirdism, anti-clericalism, anti-parliamentarism, anti-communism and anti-capitalism.

Certain elements of the more orthodox and terribilist fascism, such as socialization of the economy, corporatism and hostility to the monarchy, were taken up by the Republican Fascist Party in the short-lived Italian Social Republic and today can be found in part in the small Fascism and Freedom Movement – National Socialist Party.

== See also ==
- Fascist socialization
- Left-wing fascism
- National Bolshevism
- Revolutionary nationalism
- Revolutionary syndicalism
- Sansepolcrismo
- Social chauvinism
- Social fascism
- Strasserism
