= Florestano Vancini =

Italian film director and screenwriter

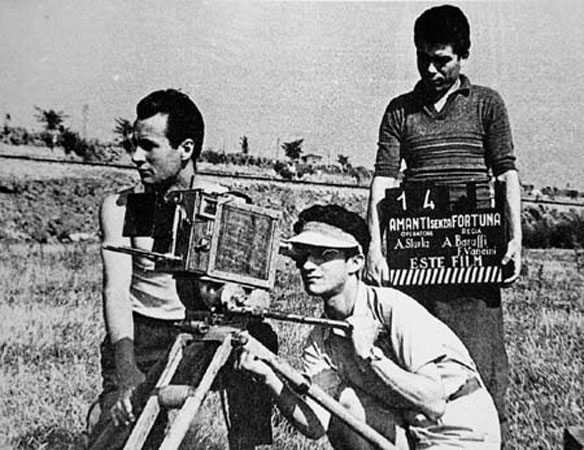
- Vancini, on the right (1949)
- Born: 24 August 1926; Ferrara, Italy
- Died: 18 September 2008 (aged 82); Rome, Italy
- Occupations: film director, screenwriter

Florestano Vancini (24 August 1926 – 18 September 2008) was an Italian film director and screenwriter.

He directed over 20 films since 1960. His 1966 film Le stagioni del nostro amore, starring Enrico Maria Salerno, was entered into the 16th Berlin International Film Festival. His 1973 film The Assassination of Matteotti was entered into the 8th Moscow International Film Festival where it won a Special Prize. In 1999 he was a member of the jury at the 21st Moscow International Film Festival.

== Filmography as director ==
- Delta padano (short, 1951)
- Long Night in 1943 (1960)
- La banda Casaroli (1962)
- Le italiane e l'amore (1962)
- The Warm Life (1964)
- Seasons of Our Love (1966)
- Long Days of Vengeance (1967)
- Blow Hot, Blow Cold (1969)
- The Sicilian Checkmate (1972)
- Bronte: cronaca di un massacro che i libri di storia non hanno raccontato (1972)
- The Assassination of Matteotti (1973)
- Amore amaro (1974)
- Mimi (1979)
- La baraonda (1980)
- Fragheto, una strage: perché? (1980) – a documentary interviewing survivors of the Fragheto massacre
- La neve nel bicchiere (1984)
- La piovra, season 2 (TV) (1984)
- ...e ridendo l'uccise (2005)
