= Joe Wright =

British film director (born 1972)

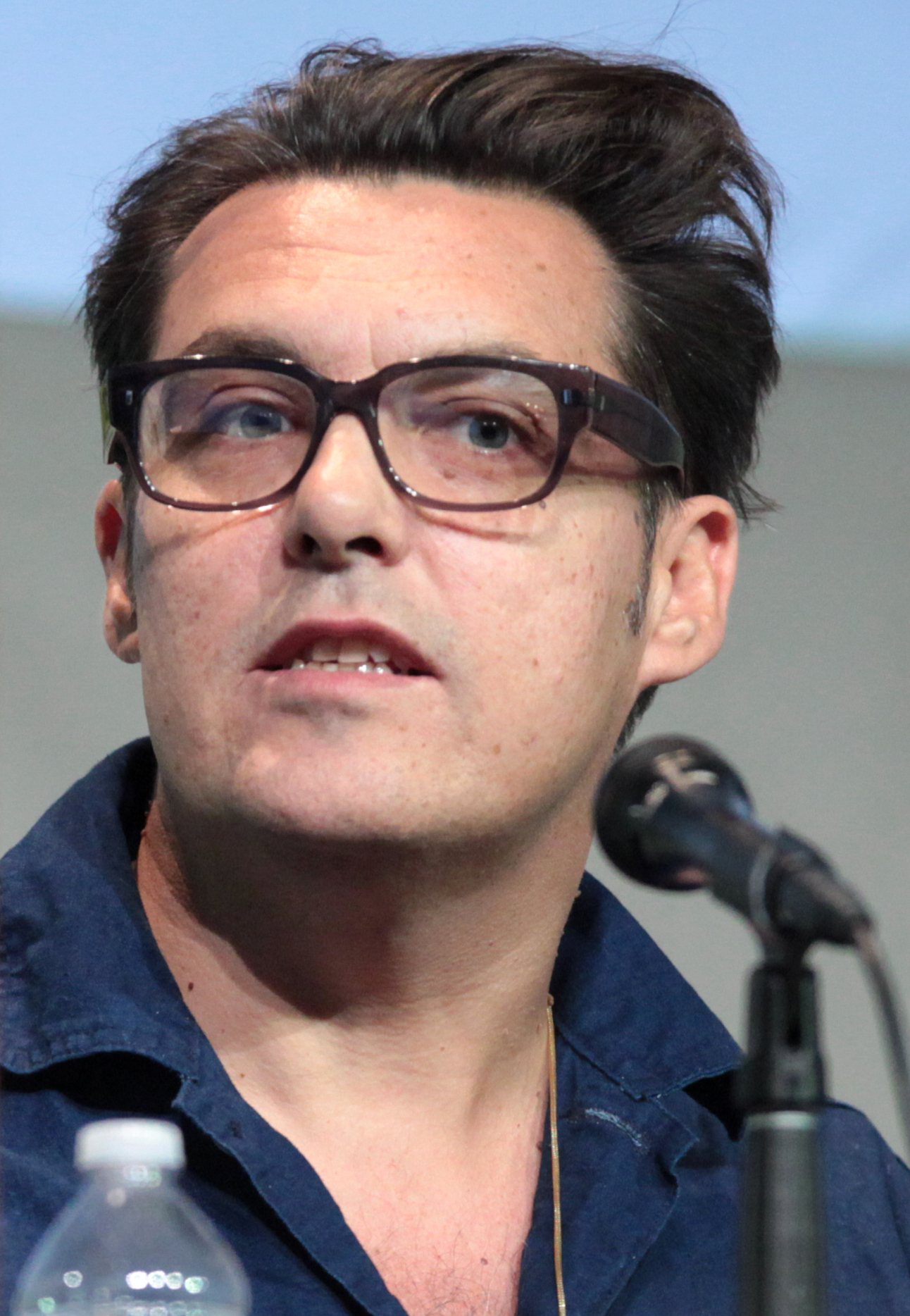
- Wright in 2015
- Born: Joseph Wright; 25 August 1972 (age 54); London, England
- Education: Central Saint Martins
- Occupations: Film director; television director; film producer
- Years active: 1997–present
- Spouse: Anoushka Shankar (m. 2010; div. 2019)
- Partner(s): Haley Bennett (2017–present)
- Children: 3

Joseph Wright (born 25 August 1972) is an English filmmaker. He began his career directing music videos and television series, before making his feature directorial debut with Pride & Prejudice (2005), based on the Jane Austen novel. His subsequent works include the period drama adaptations Atonement (2007), Anna Karenina (2012), and Cyrano (2021), the action thriller Hanna (2011), the Peter Pan origin story Pan (2015), and the Winston Churchill biopic Darkest Hour (2017). He also directed the historical drama television series Mussolini: Son of the Century (2025).

Wright has been nominated for six BAFTA Film Awards and won Outstanding Debut by a British Writer, Director or Producer for Pride & Prejudice. He also won a BAFTA TV Award for Best Drama Series for the BBC Television serial Charles II: The Power and the Passion (2003), and was nominated for a Golden Globe Award for Best Director for Atonement.

== Early life and career ==
Wright always had an interest in the arts, especially painting. He also made films on his Super 8 camera and spent time in the evenings acting in a drama club. Wright is dyslexic. He went to Islington Green Secondary School, but left without any GCSEs.

He began his career working at his parents' puppet theatre, the Little Angel Theatre in Islington. He also took classes at the Anna Scher Theatre School and acted professionally on stage and camera. He spent an art foundation year at Camberwell College of Arts, before taking a degree in fine art and film at Central St Martins where he was tutored by Malcolm Le Grice and Vera Neubauer. In his last year of studies he received a scholarship to make a short film for the BBC that won several awards.

== Career ==
=== Music videos ===
During the 1990s, he worked at Oil Factory, a music video production company based in Caledonian Road, Kings Cross. He worked on a variety of productions in numerous roles, including casting director. Here, he was able to get the opportunity to direct some music videos. Alongside this, particularly on the strength of his short film work, he was also developing The End, his second short film. During this decade, he also worked part-time as a roadie for Vegetable Vision, who created visuals for electronic music bands such as The Chemical Brothers, Darren Emerson, Underworld and Andrew Weatherall.

Wright attributes some of the aesthetic and emotion of the UK rave scene as an influence on his work.

=== Television ===
On the success of his first short film, Wright was offered the script for the serial Nature Boy (2000).

He followed this up with the serials Bodily Harm (2002) with Timothy Spall and the highly acclaimed Charles II: The Power and the Passion (2003) with Rufus Sewell, which won the BAFTA Award for Best Drama Serial.

In 2022, Wright began directing an eight-part adaptation of the bestselling novel M: Son of the Century, a historical novel by Antonio Scurati recounting the rise of Italian dictator Benito Mussolini. Mussolini: Son of the Century premiered at the 81st Venice International Film Festival on 5 September 2024 and began airing on Sky Atlantic on 10 January 2025.

In 2023, Wright was developing an adaptation for HBO of the bestselling non-fiction book Empty Mansions: The Mysterious Life of Huguette Clark and the Spending of a Great American Fortune about heiress Huguette Clark, daughter of copper baron and United States Senator William A. Clark.

=== Feature films ===
In 2005, Wright made the transition to feature films with his critically acclaimed adaptation of Pride & Prejudice starring Keira Knightley and Matthew Macfadyen. It received numerous accolades, nominations and awards, including four Academy Award nominations (including Best Actress) and six BAFTA nominations (Wright won for Most Promising Newcomer).

Wright's next feature was a 2007 adaptation of Ian McEwan's Booker Prize-shortlisted novel Atonement, which reunited Wright with Keira Knightley, and also stars James McAvoy and Saoirse Ronan. It was nominated for seven Golden Globe Awards, more than any other film that year. Though Wright was not nominated for director, the film received seven Academy Award nominations, winning only for Best Original Score. At the BAFTA Awards, it received 14 nominations and won Best Film and Best Production Design.

Wright's next film was The Soloist, starring Jamie Foxx and Robert Downey, Jr. It is about the "true story of musical prodigy Nathaniel Ayers, who developed schizophrenia in his second year at Juilliard and ended up homeless on the streets of downtown L.A. where he performs the violin and cello." It was to be released on 21 November 2008, but was pushed back to 24 April 2009.

Wright reunited with Atonement star Saoirse Ronan for the 2011 action thriller Hanna. The title character is a 15-year-old girl trained since birth to be an assassin by her father (Eric Bana), a rogue CIA asset. It received mostly positive reviews, with Roger Ebert calling it a "first-rate thriller".

Wright directed the 2012 screen adaptation by Sir Tom Stoppard of Leo Tolstoy's classic novel Anna Karenina. The cast included Keira Knightley as Anna, Jude Law as her husband, Aaron Taylor-Johnson as her young love, Irish actor Domhnall Gleeson as Konstantin Levin, as well as Kelly Macdonald, Olivia Williams, Matthew Macfadyen and Michelle Dockery. Saoirse Ronan and Andrea Riseborough were initially cast, but dropped out and were replaced by Alicia Vikander and Ruth Wilson, respectively.

Wright then directed the 2015 prequel to Peter Pan for Warner Bros. The film starred Hugh Jackman, Garrett Hedlund, Rooney Mara, Amanda Seyfried and Levi Miller as Peter. The screenplay by actor-turned-screenwriter Jason Fuchs was from the 2013 Hollywood Black List, a selection of popular unproduced scripts. The film was negatively received by critics and was considered a commercial flop, failing to recoup its budget at the box office. Rooney Mara's casting as Tiger Lily caused a controversy, due to her being of European ancestry, while Tiger Lily is traditionally portrayed as Native American.

Wright's 2017 film Darkest Hour covers a pivotal month in the life of former British Prime Minister Winston Churchill. It stars Gary Oldman as Churchill, along with Ben Mendelsohn, Ronald Pickup, David Schofield, Kristin Scott Thomas, Samuel West and Lily James. Wright said the film was a rebuke to Donald Trump.

In 2021, Wright directed The Woman in the Window, a psychological thriller starring Amy Adams, which received negative reviews. The same year, he also directed Cyrano, a musical based on the Cyrano de Bergerac. The film was well-received and earned multiple Golden Globe and BAFTA nominations.

Wright is also set to direct AI thriller Alignment, written by Nathan Dotan and distributed by Fifth Season.

== Directorial trademarks ==
Wright won a BAFTA Award for best newcomer for Pride & Prejudice and was the youngest director to have a film open the Venice Film Festival with Atonement. According to the director's commentary on Pride & Prejudice, Wright is influenced by the work of British film director David Lean, and possessing a certain knowledge of art history, tries sometimes to compose his shots after classical paintings.

Charles II: The Power and The Passion, Pride & Prejudice, Atonement and Hanna all have long tracking shots in them. Atonement has a continuous five-minute and five second shot of the Dunkirk evacuation. "Basically, I just like showing off", Wright told the audience at the Hay Festival.

== Personal life ==
After meeting on the set of Pride & Prejudice, Wright began a relationship with actress Rosamund Pike. They were engaged from 2007 to 2008.

Wright was married to British-American sitarist Anoushka Shankar from 2010 until 2019. They have two sons born in 2011 and 2015. They separated in December 2017 after Shankar discovered his affair with American actress Haley Bennett. Their divorce was finalized in September 2019 as a judge concluded that Wright had committed adultery and that his wife found living with him "intolerable". Shankar took custody of their two children.

Wright has been in a relationship with Bennett since 2017. Their daughter was born in 2018 in Brooklyn Heights. As of 2019, the family resides in the UK in Somerset.

== Filmography ==
=== Short films ===
- Crocodile Snap (1997)
- The End (1998)
- Princess & Peppernose (2021)

=== Feature films ===
Director

Year	Title	Distribution
2005	Pride & Prejudice	Focus Features / Universal Pictures
2007	Atonement	Universal Pictures
2009	The Soloist	Paramount Pictures / Universal Pictures
2011	Hanna	Focus Features / Sony Pictures Releasing
2012	Anna Karenina	Focus Features
2015	Pan	Warner Bros. Pictures
2017	Darkest Hour	Focus Features / Universal Pictures
2021	The Woman in the Window	Netflix
2021	Cyrano	United Artists Releasing / Universal Pictures

Executive producer only

- Lost Angels: Skid Row Is My Home (2010)
- Hummingbird (2013)
- Locke (2013)
- Swallow (2019)
- Radioactive (2019)

=== Television ===
Year	Title	Notes
2000	Nature Boy	Miniseries
2001	Bob & Rose	4 episodes
2002	Bodily Harm	Miniseries
2003	Charles II: The Power and the Passion	Television film
2016	Black Mirror	Episode "Nosedive"
2024	The Agency	2 episodes
2025	Mussolini: Son of the Century	8 episodes

=== Commercial work ===
- "Chanel No. 5: Wherever I Go" (2012)
- "Chanel No. 5: There You Are" (2012)
- "Coco Mademoiselle: Chanel" (2014)

== Awards and nominations ==
Awards and nominations received for films directed by Wright
Year	Title	Academy Awards		BAFTA Awards		Golden Globe Awards	
Year	Title	Nominations	Wins	Nominations	Wins	Nominations	Wins
2005	Pride & Prejudice	4		6	1	2	
2007	Atonement	7	1	14	2	7	2
2012	Anna Karenina	4	1	6	1	1	
2017	Darkest Hour	6	2	9	2	1	1
2021	Cyrano	1		4		2	
Total		22	4	39	6	13	3

Year	Title	Award	Category	Result
2005	Pride & Prejudice	BAFTA Awards	Outstanding Debut by a British Writer, Director or Producer	Won
2005	Pride & Prejudice	Boston Society of Film Critics	Best New Filmmaker	Won
2005	Pride & Prejudice	Chicago Film Critics Association	Most Promising Filmmaker	Nominated
2005	Pride & Prejudice	Empire Awards	Best Director	Nominated
2005	Pride & Prejudice	London Film Critics' Circle	British Newcomer of the Year	Nominated
2007	Atonement	BAFTA Awards	Best Direction	Nominated
2007	Atonement	Critics' Choice Awards	Best Director	Nominated
2007	Atonement	Golden Globes	Best Director	Nominated
2007	Atonement	London Film Critics' Circle	Best Director	Nominated
2007	Atonement	Southeastern Film Critics Association	Best Director	Nominated
2007	Atonement	Washington D.C. Area Film Critics Association	Best Director	Nominated
2021	The Woman in the Window	Golden Raspberry Awards	Worst Director	Nominated

Directed Academy Award performances

Year	Performer	Film	Result
Academy Award for Best Actor
2018	Gary Oldman	Darkest Hour	Won
Academy Award for Best Actress
2006	Keira Knightley	Pride & Prejudice	Nominated
Academy Award for Best Supporting Actress
2008	Saoirse Ronan	Atonement	Nominated
