= Shadow Cabinet of Italy (1989) =

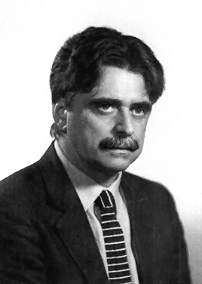
Achille Occhetto

The first Shadow Cabinet of Italy was launched by Achille Occhetto, Secretary of the Italian Communist Party from 1988 to 1991. The shadow cabinet was officially presented on 19 July 1989.

Portfolio	Shadow Minister
Shadow Prime Minister	Achille Occhetto
Shadow Deputy Prime Minister	Gianni Pellicani
Shadow Minister of Foreign Affairs	Giorgio Napolitano
Shadow Minister of the Interior	Aldo Tortorella
Shadow Minister of Economy	Alfredo Reichlin
Shadow Minister of Justice	Stefano Rodotà
Shadow Minister of Defense	Gianni Cervetti
Shadow Minister of European Affairs	Sergio Segre
Shadow Minister of the Treasury	Filippo Cavazzuti
Shadow Minister of Finance	Vincenzo Visco
Shadow Minister of Industry	Gianfranco Borghini
Shadow Minister of Infrastructures and Network Services	Sergio Garavini
Shadow Minister of Territory and Home	Ada Becchi
Shadow Minister of Health	Giovanni Berlinguer
Shadow Minister of Environment	Chicco Testa
Shadow Minister of School	Aureliana Alberici
Shadow Minister of Research	Edoardo Vesentini
Shadow Minister of Culture and Spectacle	Ettore Scola
Shadow Minister of Labour	Adalberto Minucci
Shadow Minister of Agriculture	Carla Barbarella
Shadow Minister without portfolio (Youth)	Grazia Zuffa
Shadow Minister without portfolio (Women)	Romana Bianchi
Shadow Minister without portfolio (Battle against Drugs)	Luigi Cancrini

== See also ==
- Shadow Cabinet of Italy (2008)
