= Italian road to socialism =

Ideology of the Italian Communist Party

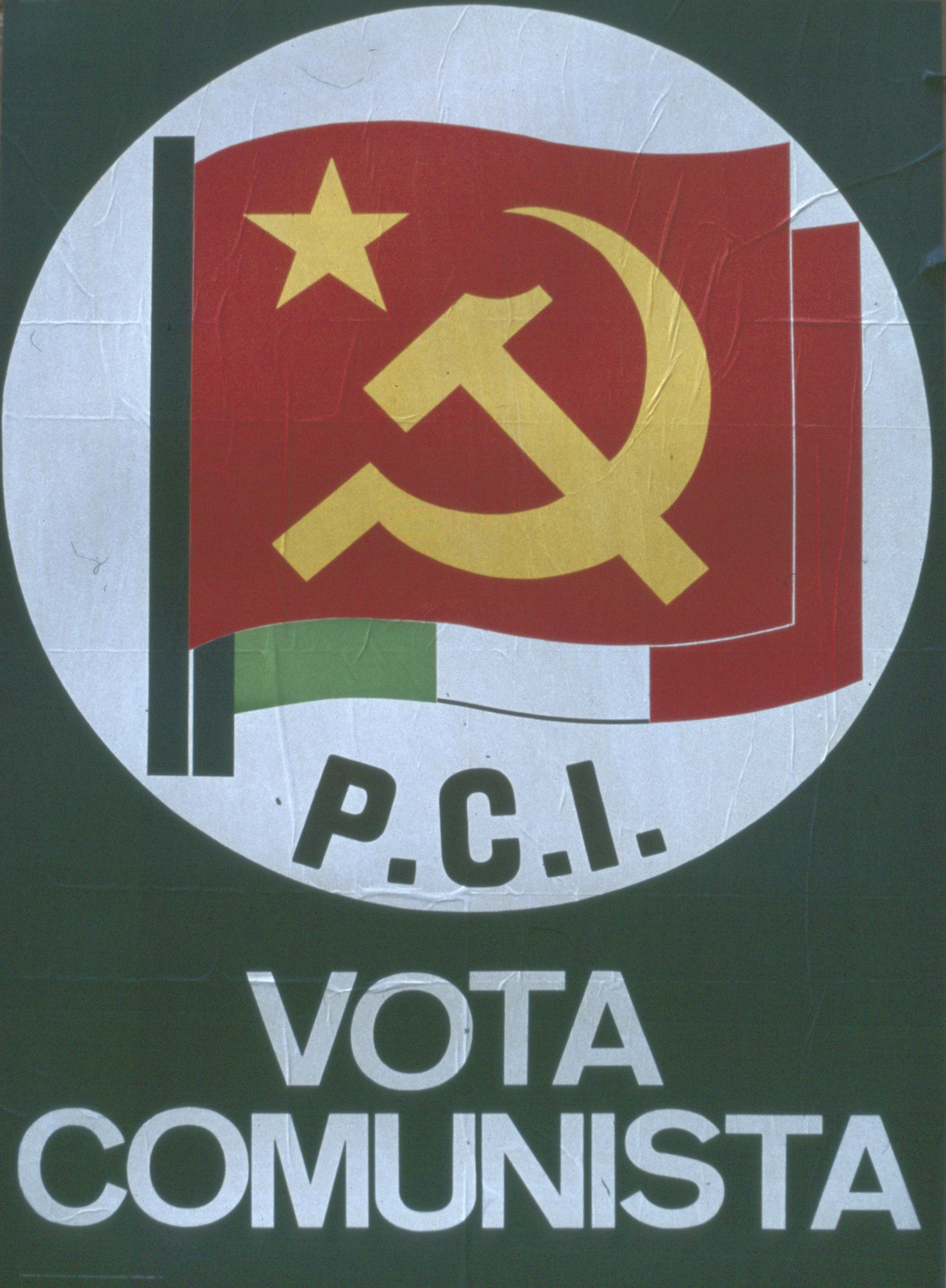
The famous election poster stating "Vote Communist"

The Italian road to socialism (Italian: via italiana al socialismo) was the ideology and political practice of the Italian Communist Party (PCI), whose origin were the ideas of Antonio Gramsci, and was formalized during the VIII Congress in 1956 by General Secretary Palmiro Togliatti.

The Italian road to socialism involved the recognition and defense of the republican Constitution of Italy, which the communists contributed to draft, and the arrival at socialism also through the institutions. It also implied it was right for Italy to act as a bridge between the United States and the Soviet Union, being autonomous from both.

== History ==
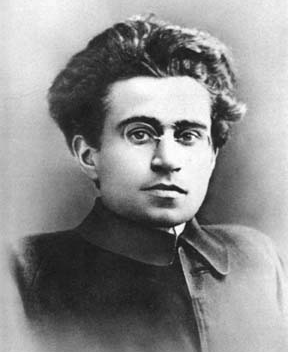
Antonio Gramsci, the secretary of the Communist Party of Italy from 1924 to 1927

The roots of the Italian road to socialism were in Antonio Gramsci's Prison Notebooks, in particular his considerations regarding historical materialism, the Unification of Italy, the role of intellectuals in society and the political party seen as the modern Prince in Machiavelli. Although the ties with the Soviet Union remained very close, a political difference between the PCI and the Communist Party of the Soviet Union (CPSU) began to appear during the Reconstruction phase (1945–1948), in which the party leadership gradually abandoned the prospect of an armed insurrection to establish the "dictatorship of the proletariat" in favor of collaborating in the construction of a "progressive democracy", i.e. a democracy destined to be increasingly open and participated by the masses. For a period the leadership maintained a strategic duplicity between insurrection and parliamentarism.

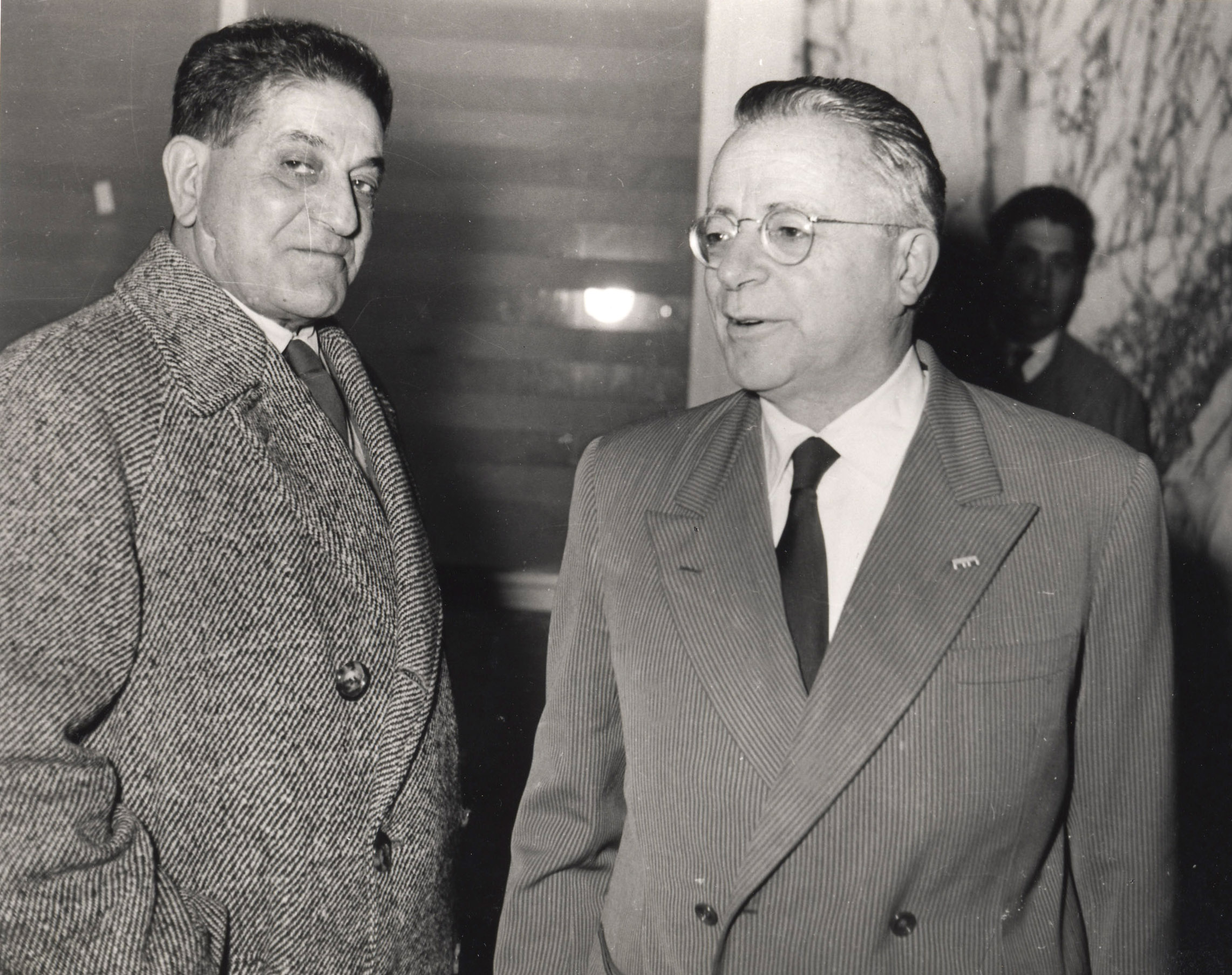
By the left, Giuseppe Di Vittorio, secretary of the union CGIL and Palmiro Togliatti, the secretary of the PCI from 1927 to 1934 and from 1938 to 1964.

In 1948, Togliatti praised the republican Constitution, which the PCI had helped to write, as "democratic", declaring that the PCI recognized would fight for its effective application, which in his opinion was threatened by the non-socialist economical structure of Italy. With the death of Joeph Stalin in 1953 and the "secret report" drawn up by Nikita Khrushchev in 1956, a policy of greater autonomy of the PCI from Moscow was pursued. A significant turning point took place at the VIII Congress of the PCI in December 1956, which opened with Togliatti's report "For an Italian road to socialism, for a democratic government of the working classes", which would become the official ideology of the party.

Togliatti reiterated innovations that were not secondary in Marxist tradition. The structural reforms were "the fabric of the Italian road to socialism", which is democratic not only because of its method but because "the maturation of the working class as a new ruling class proceeds ... on the basis of a progressive extension...of democratic control over production processes and economic development". The PCI would mature with Togliatti in the form of a national-popular party, open to dialogue with the Catholic world and with other democratic forces. Luigi Longo, who succeeded Togliatti in 1964, continued in the Togliatti-like Italian road to socialism in obtaining more advanced laws despite being in the opposition but at the head of social movements. The long struggle of the trade unions that led to the Workers' Statute in 1970 was hailed as a milestone for the Italian road to socialism, despite the PCI having proposed a more advanced one.

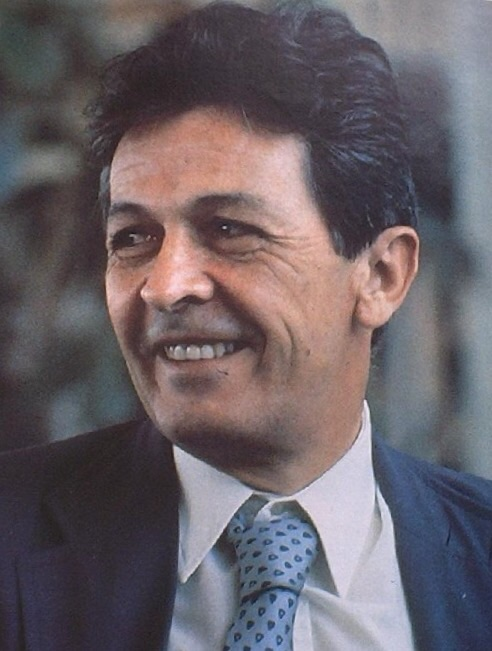
Enrico Berlinguer, the secretary of the PCI from 1972 to 1984

In the field of foreign relations and the international Communist movement, he promoted the Togliattian theme of "polycentrism" (Italian: policentrismo ), developing a dialogue both with the countries of the Soviet bloc and with the progressive forces of the Western bloc and with the emerging forces of the non-aligned countries, which they were born from the great process of decolonization underway. Enrico Berlinguer, who succeeded Longo in 1972, would bring the Italian road to socialism to the maximum of its successes, both in domestic and international politics. In the 1970s, the PCI saw a gradual increase in consensus and prestige, also due to the good results in the administration of cities and regions, which would lead to the historic result in the 1976 Italian general election, where the party obtained 34% of the vote. Berlinguer would continue to maintain that in Italy "we can and must not only advance towards socialism, but also build a socialist society, with the contribution of different political forces, organisations, parties and that the working class can" and that they "must affirm its historical function in a pluralistic and democratic system". Moreover, after years of struggle, the establishment in Italy of the universal and public national health system in 1978 (Enrico's brother, Giovanni Berlinguer, played an important role) was hailed as a step forward on the Italian road to socialism.

On the Italian road to socialism, Berlinguer's PCI looked with great attention to the experiment of Popular Unity in Chile, a coalition of socialists, communists, and Christian democrats led by Salvador Allende, which ended in tragedy with the 1973 Chilean coup d'état. Popular Unity was the inspiration for the policy of the Historic Compromise with Aldo Moro, which should have led to the birth of a Christian Democracy (DC) and PCI-led government, which never happened due to the kidnapping and murder of Moro in 1978. He also posed important innovations on the international level, imagining a Europe being "neither anti-Soviet nor anti-American", deepening the strategy intuited by Togliatti, for a European reconciliation, and to overcome the limited sovereignty that had been imposed on both Western and Eastern Europe, reclaiming the right of Italy and the European nations to decide their own destiny autonomously. This view inspired Eurocommunism, which was the dominant ideology among European Communist parties between the late 1970s and early 1980s. He placed great importance on the phenomenon of decolonization. Aware of the turbulence that it would entail, he posed the defense of peace and the use of diplomacy as a means of resolving conflicts as a fundamental issue for a road towards socialism.

Alessandro Natta, who succeeded Berlinguer upon his death in 1984, declared that he wanted to pursue the Italian road to socialism, even if the PCI was going through a troubled period because of the difficult international situation, the joint attack of the Italian Socialist Party (PSI) led by Bettino Craxi and large sectors of the DC who rallied around Craxi, as well as from the rise of Silvio Berlusconi. The main sign of the PCI's weakening was its defeat in the 1985 Italian wage referendum. Achille Occhetto, who took over from Natta in 1988 after his resignation for health reasons, was promoter of the end of the Italian road to socialism, embracing the Third Way politics of mainstream centre-left parties, concretizing his action in 1989, when he announced the turning point of the Bolognina (Italian: svolta della Bolognina), opening a debate in the party's cadres, in order to dissolve the party and to abandon the socialist perspective (he was supported by the 67% of the party's cadres). During the XX Congress in Rimini in 1991, his position was supported by 86% of the cadres, and was finally formalised the dissolution of the PCI and the foundation of the Democratic Party of the Left (PDS) with Occhetto himself as leader. The dissolution of the PCI was opposed by a group of delegates that would later form the Communist Refoundation Party (PRC) in order to continue the struggle for the Italian road to socialism with other Italian left-wing experiences.

== Domestic politics ==
We want a Socialist society that matches the conditions of our Country, that respects all the freedoms enshrined in our Constitution, founded on a plurality of Parties ... a society that respects all freedoms of human beings except one, the one of exploit the labour of other human beings.

— Enrico Berlinguer

The Italian road to socialism, framed as a long march within democratic institutions and at the head of social movements to obtain greater spaces for political and economic democracy, is characterized by openness to political pluralism. The first important step was dictated by historical contingencies, with the "Turning point of Salerno" (Svolta di Salerno) in 1944, when the Garibaldi Brigades under the political leadership of Togliatti collaborated together with all the forces of the National Liberation Committee to coordinate and optimize the efforts in the struggle for liberation from Nazi-fascism. Despite difficulties, dialogue followed to draft the Constitution.

Another important step was Togliatti's great opening to the Catholic world, with the appeal to Catholics in 1954, in the name of defending peace and the values of Christian solidarity. Since the foundation of the Communist Party in 1921, religion had been used as a propaganda expedient against the PCI, with the reconciliation of Togliatti many italian Catholics joined the PCI. There was great closeness to the Italian General Confederation of Labour (CGIL) led by Di Vittorio, for the defense of workers' rights, while recognizing the importance of the union's autonomy from the party, particularly starting from 1956.

Regarding economic issues, the PCI always defended the importance of state management of the economy, progressive taxation, and the nationalization of strategic sectors both for the economy (gas, electricity, and oil) and for national security (motorways, railways, and telecommunications). It was debated that culture, art and recreational activities should be encouraged by the state and be able to be practiced freely for a fairer and happier development of the personality. Education, healthcare, housing and work were considered fundamental rights, and it should be the state's responsibility to provide them to citizens through money obtained through taxation.

== Foreign politics ==
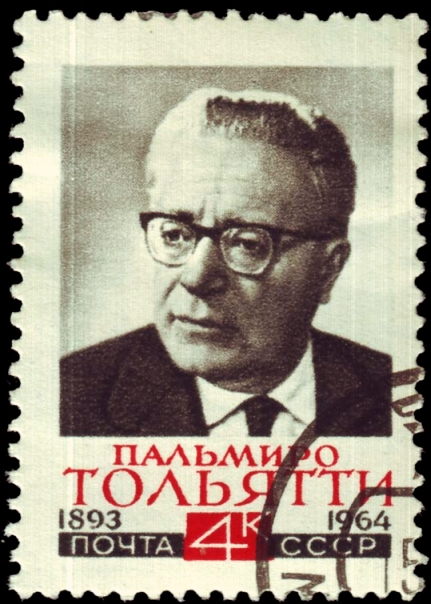
A Soviet stamp celebrating Togliatti

Togliatti was always appreciated in the Communist International (Comintern) for his diplomatic abilities, such that Leon Trotsky nicknamed him "The Comintern jurist". After the rise of fascism in Italy, the party dedicated his agenda in opposing every imperialist and aggressive politics guided by the Italian fascist dictator Benito Mussolini. It formed the Garibaldi Battalion, which served in the Spanish Civil War (1936–1939) defending the Spanish Republic. After the Italian invasion of Ethiopia in 1935, the party sent some delegates, the most famous was Ilio Barontini, to train and lead the Ethiopian resistance movement (Arbegnoch). During the Italian Resistance and the Italian Civil War, the party built a close relationship with the Yugoslav Partisans guided by Josip Broz Tito, which was interrupted after the Tito–Stalin split in 1948; however, the friendship resumed in 1955.

When the Soviet Union invaded Hungary in 1956, the majority of the PCI sustained the position of Khrushchev on the Hungarian Revolution of 1956, even if someone was perplexed or opposed. When Mao Zedong broke the relations with the Soviet Union under Khruschev in 1961, Togliatti wrote a work, the "Yalta Memorandum", where he defended the right of building socialism in an autonomous way pursued by Mao. The party had much attention and good opinion on the Non-Aligned Movement countries. Enrico Mattei's energy politics, abruptly interrupted by his death in 1962, was critically supported by the PCI. When the Soviet Union invaded Czechoslovakia in 1968 to end the Prague Spring, the party condemned the decision of Moscow.

The PCI's foreign policy gradually took on a policy in defense of the national interest, distancing itself from the United States and the Soviet Union, although the Soviets often had closer positions to those of the PCI. The national interest was identified in autonomy from the United States and in the construction of an autonomous Europe with the promotion, together with the French Communist Party (PCF) and the Spanish Communist Party (PCE), of Eurocommunism in the 1970s, in a policy of dialogue towards the countries of the Eastern Bloc and towards the Mediterranean countries.

The Italian road to socialism fully supported the decolonization process and the related national liberation movements, starting from the Cuban Revolution (1953–1959), the Vietnam Resistance during the Vietnam War against the United States (1955–1975), the Algerian War of Independence (1954–1962), and the Palestinian Resistance and Palestine Liberation Organization (PLO), among others. The key of the international politics of the Italian road to socialism, already intuited by Togliatti and Longo and then explored further by Berlinguer, was that of a slow transition towards a "polycentric world" (Italian: mondo policentrico), which would born from the two big crossed phenomena, the decolonization and the end of Cold War. The task of the nations would be to govern this process by avoiding armed conflict and nuclear danger and instead using international law and diplomacy, avoiding hostile policies, both of an economic and war nature, towards any nation.

== Bibliography ==
Main books

- The Italian Road to Socialism, Eric Hobsbawm, Journeyman, 1977.
- (in Italian) La via italiana al socialismo, Palmiro Togliatti, Editori Riuniti, 1972.
- (in Italian) Il 1956 e la via italiana al socialismo, Palmiro Togliatti, Alexander Hoebel, Editori Riuniti, 2016.
- (in Italian) Storia della Repubblica: L'Italia dalla Liberazione ad oggi, Guido Crainz, Donzelli, 2013.
- Gramsci contested: interpretations, debates and polemics 1922–2012, Guido Liguori, BRILL, 2021.
- (in Italian) Da Gramsci a Berlinguer. La via italiana al socialismo attraverso i congressi del partito comunista italiano 1921–1984 Vol. I, II, III, IV, V, D. Pugliese, Marsilio, 1985.
- (in Italian) La pace al primo posto. Scritti e discorsi di politica internazionale 1972–1984, Enrico Berlinguer, Alexander Hoebel, Donzelli, 2023.
- (in Italian) Allende e Berlinguer. Il Cile dell'Unidad Popular e il compromesso storico italiano, Andrea Mulas, Manni, 2005.
- (in Italian) Il 1956: Un bilancio storico e storiografico, Fabrizio Loreto et al., Accademia University Press, 2022.

== See also ==
- Democratic socialism
- Democracy in Marxism
- Politics of Italy
- Socialist democracy
