= List of political magazines =

This is a list of political magazines.

== Currently published ==
Name	Nation	Political orientation	Year founded
Arena	Australia	Leftist	1963
The Monthly	Australia	Progressive	2005
News Weekly	Australia	Conservative	1943
Quadrant	Australia	Conservative	1956
Quillette	Australia	Libertarian	2015
Datum	Austria	Moderate	2004
profil	Austria	Center-left	1970
Dhaka Courier	Bangladesh	Moderate	1984
Forum	Bangladesh	Moderate	1969
The Star	Bangladesh	Liberal/progressive	1991
EUobserver	Belgium	Moderate	2000
Carta Capital	Brazil	Leftist	1994
Época	Brazil	Center	1998
ISTOÉ	Brazil	Center-Left	1976
Veja	Brazil	Center	1968
Alberta Views	Canada	Moderate	1998
Canadian Dimension	Canada	Leftist	1963
The Dorchester Review	Canada	Conservative	2011
The Narwhal	Canada	Leftist	2018
The Walrus	Canada	Liberal	2003
This	Canada	Progressive	1966
The Tyee	Canada	Leftist	2003
Vice	Canada	Liberal	1994
Beijing Review	China	Maoist, Dengist, Xi-ist	1958
Shijie zhishi	China	State media	1934
Al Siyassa Al Dawliya	Egypt	Political	1950s
Suomen Kuvalehti	Finland	Moderate	1873
2512	France (Réunion)	Moderate	1923
Courrier International	France	Center-left/Center	1990
Le Monde diplomatique	France	Left	1954
Marianne	France	Center-left	1997
Politique internationale	France	Moderate	1981
Questions Internationales	France	International relations and foreign affairs	2003
Rivarol	France	Far right	1951
Blick nach Rechts	Germany	Anti-fascist, Social democratic	1984
Cicero	Germany	Liberal-conservative	2004
Jungle World	Germany	Undogmatic Left	1997
konkret	Germany	Far-left	1974
marx21	Germany	Far-left	2007
Internationale Politik	Germany	Moderate	1946 (renamed 1995)
Nation und Europa	Germany	Pan-European nationalism	1951
Neue Gesellschaft/ Frankfurter Hefte	Germany	Social democratic	1985
The European	Germany	Moderate	2009
Cogito	Greece	Moderate	2004
Hot Doc	Greece	Moderate	2012
Economic and Political Weekly	India	Left-leaning	1949
Frontline	India	Left	1991
OPEN	India	Moderate	2009
Organiser	India	Far Right	1947
Outlook	India	Left	1995
Swarajya	India	Right	1956
Tehelka	India	Moderate	2003
The Week	India	Moderate	1982
Nós	(Republic of Ireland) Ireland	Moderate	2008
Village (magazine)	(Republic of Ireland) Ireland	Left	2004
The Phoenix	(Republic of Ireland) Ireland	Left	1983
The Jerusalem Report	Israel	Moderate	1990
L'Espresso	Italy	Left	1955
Il Borghese	Italy	Right	1950
Lotta Comunista	Italy	Marxism–Leninism	1965
Critica marxista	Italy	Marxism	1963
The Diplomat	Japan	Moderate	2002
Assayad	Lebanon	Moderate	1943
NOW Lebanon	Lebanon	March 14 Coalition	2007
Forum	(North Macedonia) Macedonia	Moderate	1997
Gatopardo	Mexico	Moderate	2000
Siempre!	Mexico	Moderate	1953
De Groene Amsterdammer	Netherlands	Left-wing	1877
Elsevier	Netherlands	Right	1945
Expreszo	Netherlands	LGBT Youth	1990
HP/De Tijd	Netherlands	Moderate	1990 (year of merger)
Vrij Nederland	Netherlands	Left-wing	1944
Investigate	New Zealand	Conservative	1999
New Zealand Listener	New Zealand	Moderate	1939
Rodong Sinmun	North Korea	Juche	1945
Herald	Pakistan	Liberal	1969
Newsline	Pakistan	Moderate	1989
Newsbreak	Philippines	Moderate	2001
Do Rzeczy	Poland	Conservative	2013
Gazeta Polska	Poland	Right-wing	1993
Gazeta Wyborcza	Poland	Liberal, democratic	1989
Krytyka Polityczna	Poland	Left/Communist(formerly); Liberal, center-left	2002
Polityka	Poland	Center-left	1957
Przekrój	Poland	Moderate	1945
Uważam Rze	Poland	Conservative liberal	2011
Al Majalla	Saudi Arabia	Moderate	1980
Al Yamamah	Saudi Arabia	Moderate	1952
Amandla!	South Africa	Left	2007
Politica Exterior	Spain	Moderate	1987
Arena	Sweden	Left	1993
Brand	Sweden	Anarchist	1898
Expo	Sweden	Anti-racism	1995
Fokus	Sweden	Moderate	2005
Aksiyon	Turkey	Moderate	1994
Bayan Yani	Turkey	Women's politics	2011
Barn	United Kingdom	Welsh nationalist	1962
BBC Focus on Africa	United Kingdom	Moderate (statutorily impartial)	1990
Forced Migration Review	United Kingdom	Internal displacement, refugee, statelessness issues	1988
Frontline	United Kingdom	Socialist	2000
International Organization	United Kingdom	Moderate	1947
Lobster	United Kingdom	"Parapolitics"	1983
Monocle	United Kingdom	Moderate	2007
New African	United Kingdom	Moderate	1966
New Internationalist	United Kingdom	Green	1973
New Statesman	United Kingdom	Social Democrat	1913
Prospect	United Kingdom	Liberal	1995
Red Pepper	United Kingdom	Green/Democratic Socialist	2007
Standpoint	United Kingdom	Conservative	2008
Socialist Standard	United Kingdom	Socialist	1904
Socialist Worker	United Kingdom	Socialist	1961
The Big Issue	United Kingdom	Left	1991
The Economist	United Kingdom	Classical Liberal	1843
The Middle East	United Kingdom	Moderate	1974
The Salisbury Review	United Kingdom	Conservative	1982
The Spectator	United Kingdom	Conservative	1828
The Week	United Kingdom	Moderate	1995
Tribune	United Kingdom	Left	1937
The American	United States	Conservative/Libertarian	2006
The American Conservative	United States	Conservative	2002
The American Interest	United States	Moderate	2005
The American Prospect	United States	Progressive	1990
The American Spectator	United States	Right-wing/Ultra Conservative	1967
The Atlantic	United States	Moderate	1857
The Baffler	United States	Left	1988
Bay Area Reporter	United States	LGBT politics	1971
TheBlaze	United States	Conservative/Right-wing	2010
Bloomberg Businessweek	United States	Moderate	1929
Cato Journal	United States	Libertarian/Center-Right	1981
City Journal	United States	Conservative	1990
The Chicago Reporter	United States	Left	1972
Chronicles	United States	Paleoconservative/Far Right	1976
Commentary	United States	Liberal (formerly); Neoconservative	1945
Common Dreams	United States	Progressive/Left	1997
Columbus Monthly	United States	Moderate	1975
CounterPunch	United States	Left-wing	1994
Current Affairs	United States	Socialist	2015
DSA	United States	Democratic Socialism	1973
Dissent	United States	Democratic Socialist	1954
El Iberoamericano	United States	Moderate	2004
Foreign Affairs	United States	Moderate	1922
Foreign Policy	United States	Moderate	1970
Harper's Magazine	United States	Liberal	1850
Harvard Political Review	United States	Moderate	1969
The Huffington Post	United States	Liberal/Feminist/LGBTQ Issues	2005
Human Events	United States	Conservative	1944
The Independent Review	United States	Libertarian	1996
In These Times	United States	Progressive/Left	1976
Jacobin	United States	Democratic Socialist	2010
Journal of Politics & Society	United States	Moderate	1989
Mint Press News	United States	Left-leaning	2012
Monthly Review	United States	Socialist/ Marxist	1949
Mother Jones	United States	Social Liberalism	1976
The Nation	United States	Progressive/Left	1865
National Review	United States	Conservative	1955
The National Interest	United States	Realist/Moderate; Neoconservative (formerly)	1985
The New American	United States	Conservative	1958
New Politics	United States	Democratic Socialist	1961
The New Republic	United States	Liberal	1914
The New Yorker	United States	Liberal	1925
Newsmax	United States	Conservative	1998
Newsweek	United States	Moderate	1933
The Progressive	United States	Liberal	1909
Policy Review	United States	Conservative	1989
Politico Magazine	United States	Moderate	2013
Reason	United States	Libertarian	1968
Regulation	United States	Libertarian	1977
Rolling Thunder	United States	Anarchist	2005
Salon	United States	Liberal/Progressive	1995
SLATE	United States	Liberal	1996
StreetWise	United States	Progressive	1992
Time	United States	Moderate	1923
Townhall Magazine	United States	Conservative	2008
Washington Examiner	United States	Conservative	2005
Washington Monthly	United States	Liberal	1969
The Week	United States	Moderate	2001
Wired Magazine	United States	Liberal	1993
Z Magazine	United States	Anarchist/Left-Wing	1986
World	United States	Conservative/Christian	1986
World Affairs	United States	Conservative	1837

== No longer published ==
- The American Mercury, Conservative
- The American Catholic Quarterly Review, Conservative, (1876–1924)
- Arayış, Social Democratic, (1981–1982)
- Dissent (2000–2014)
- Dün ve Bugün (1955–1956)
- Al Fajr Al Jadid, Leftist (1945–1946)
- Forth (2009–2018)
- Fortnight Magazine (1970–2012)
- George (1995–2001)
- Insight, Conservative
- Ken Magazine, Communist
- Khamsin, Anti-Zionist, Socialist (1975–1989)
- National Guardian, Communist/Maoist, (1948–1992)
- Det nye Danmark, Conservative, (1928–1937)
- Partisan Review (1934–2003)
- Profane Existence (1989–2013)
- Rinascita, Communist (1944–1991)
- Sawt al-Bahrain (1950–1954)
- Società, Communist (1941–1961)
- Statsborgeren, (1831–1837)
- Viikkosanomat, Conservative (1922–1975)
- The Weekly Standard, Neoconservative, (1995–2018)
- The World of Tomorrow, Socialist (Pacifist)
- The Yankee (1828–1829)
