= Becchi =

Becchi is an Italian surname. Notable people with the surname include:

- Ada Becchi (1937–2025), Italian politician and economist
- Carlo Becchi (1939–2025), Italian theoretical physicist
- Egle Becchi (1930–2022), Italian pedagogist, historian, and academic
- Gentile de' Becchi (1420/1430–1497), Italian bishop, diplomat, orator and writer

== See also ==
- Palazzo Becchi-Magnani, a palace located in the town of Reggio Emilia in Italy
