= Oliviero Beha =

Italian journalist (1949–2017)

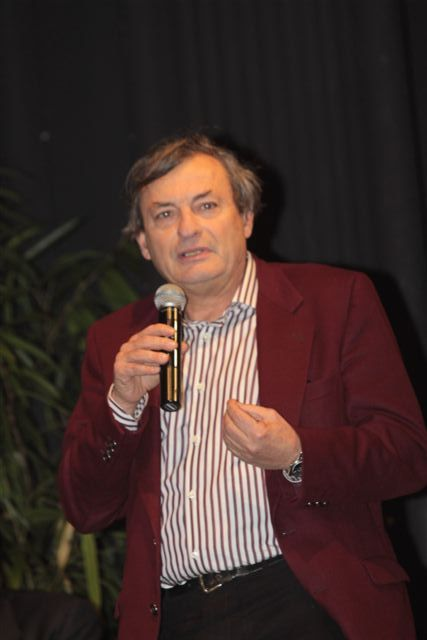
- Beha in 2011
- Born: January 14, 1949; Florence, Italy
- Died: May 13, 2017 (aged 68); Rome, Italy
- Occupation: Journalist
- Notable credit(s): Tuttosport; Paese Sera; Rinascita; Il Messaggero; Il Mattino; La Repubblica

Oliviero Beha (14 January 1949 – 13 May 2017) was an Italian journalist, writer, essayist, TV, and radio host.

== Biography ==
Beha was born in Florence and began work as a journalist in 1973 for the sports newspaper Tuttosport and for Paese Sera. During his stay in Madrid, he graduated and also practised athletics for Real Madrid.

From 1976 to 1985, he worked for the left-oriented newspaper La Repubblica, dealing with sport and social themes, and wrote articles for several editions of the Olympic Games. In 1984, he published a report in which the result of the football match between Italy and Cameroon in the 1982 Football World Cup had been decided between the players before the match. After also working for the newspaper Rinascita, Il Messaggero and Il Mattino (Beha later also worked for the right-wing L'Indipendente), in 1987, he began hosting the TV show Va' pensiero, together with Communist journalist Andrea Barbato. The show was aired on Rai 3 and lasted until 1989.

In the following years, Beha provided TV specials about Italian and international themes for Italian state television, mostly for Rai 3, and hosted the show Un terno al lotto (1991) in which people seeking and offering jobs could meet freely. The following year, Beha launched Radio Zorro, a daily radio show aired on Radio Rai. The show, later rechristened Radio Zorro 3131, was cancelled in 2004, a period in which the right government coalition led by Silvio Berlusconi controlled Rai; the closure was followed by a series of legal suits by Beha against Rai.

Beha also wrote several books, including essays and poetry collections, which won several Italian literary prizes. Among his numerous activities in the 2000s, Beha also wrote for the left newspaper L'Unità (2005–2008), and was a co-founder of Il Fatto Quotidiano in 2009. He died in Rome on 13 May 2017, aged 68.
