= Walter Chielli =

Italian politician and trade unionist (1925–1997)

Member of the Senate of the Republic
- In office 5 July 1976 – 11 June 1983
- Constituency: Grosseto

Personal details
- Born: 9 December 1925 Magliano, Province of Grosseto, Kingdom of Italy
- Died: 26 October 1997 (aged 71) Grosseto, Italy
- Party: Italian Communist Party
- Occupation: Trade unionist

Walter Chielli (9 December 1925 – 26 October 1997) was an Italian trade unionist and politician of the Italian Communist Party. He served as a senator of the Republic from 1976 to 1983.

Chielli was active in the Italian General Confederation of Labour (CGIL) and served as secretary-general of the Chamber of Labour of Grosseto from 1968 to 1974. He was a member of the Grosseto City Council from 1956 to 1969, also serving as an assessor.

He was elected to the Senate in 1976 and re-elected in 1979.
