= Critica marxista =

Italian political magazine

- Categories: Political magazine
- Frequency: Bimonthly
- Publisher: Editori Riuniti
- Founded: 1963; 62 years ago
- Country: Italy
- Based in: Rome
- Language: Italian
- Website: https://criticamarxista.net/
- ISSN: 0011-152X
- OCLC: 476296030

Critica marxista is a political magazine published in Rome, Italy. Founded in 1963 it is one of the earliest political periodicals in the country.

== History and profile ==
Critica marxista was launched in 1963. It was started by Italian Communist Party (PCI) as a theoretical journal. The founding editors were Luigi Longo, Alessandro Natta and Emilio Sereni. Until 1992 the magazine remained as a publication of the PCI. The PCI were planning to close down the publication, but a group of Italian intellectuals led by Aldo Tortorella and Aldo Zanardo bought it. The magazine covers analyses and contributions to rethink the leftist politics. It has been published on a bimonthly basis by Editori Riuniti from its start. The headquarters is in Rome.

Leading contributors of Critica marxista include Louis Althusser, Nicola Badaloni, Franco Cassano, Umberto Cerroni, Biagio De Giovanni, Cesare Luporini, Giacomo Marramao, Giuseppe Prestipino, Silvano Tagliagambe, Edoardo Sanguineti, Luciano Canfora, Mario Tronti and Giuseppe Vacca, Remo Bodei, Massimo Cacciari, Eric Hobsbawm.
