= Giovanni De Gennaro (police officer) =

Italian police officer and business executive (1948–2026)

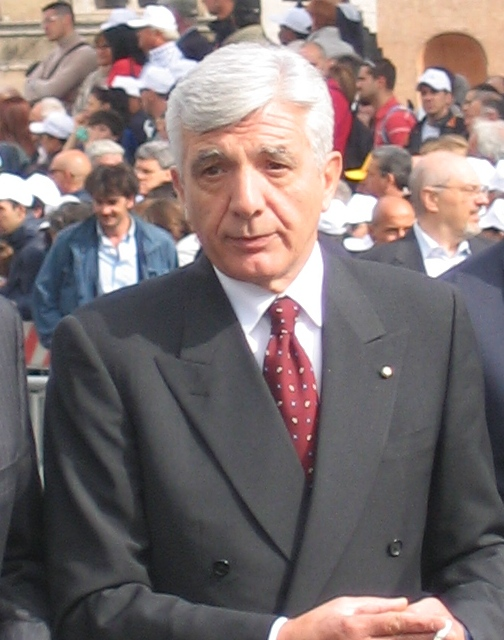

Chief of Polizia di Stato
- In office 1 June 2000 – 2 July 2007
- Preceded by: Fernando Masone
- Succeeded by: Antonio Manganelli

Personal details
- Born: 14 August 1948 Reggio Calabria, Italy
- Died: c. 21 November 2026 (aged 78) Montiano, Italy
- Alma mater: Sapienza University of Rome
- Profession: Prefect

Giovanni De Gennaro (14 August 1948 – c. 21 November 2026) was an Italian police officer, public official, prefect, and business executive who was Italy's police chief during the 2001 G8 summit in Genoa. De Gennaro was chief of the Italian police department and director of the information services and security department from 2000 to 2007. He served as Undersecretary of State to Italian Prime Minister, with responsibility for information services and security, in the Monti government from 11 May 2012 to 28 April 2013. From 2013 to 2020, he was president of Leonardo (formerly Finmeccanica).

== Early life ==
Born on 14 August 1948 in Reggio Calabria, De Gennaro graduated in Law at Sapienza University of Rome, and then joined the Italian Police Department. Afterwards, he was moved to Rome to join the narcotics unit. During his career, he collaborated with Giovanni Falcone, carrying out international investigations against the Sicilian Mafia. In 1984, he was the lead officer during the extradition issues of the informer Tommaso Buscetta from Brazil.

== Career ==
De Gennaio was appointed prefect in 1994 and became Chief of the Italian Police Department – Director General for Public Security on 26 May 2000. He was in charge of the Italian Police during the 2001 G8 summit in Genoa, including the raid on the Diaz school. For such deeds, Italy was later condemned by the European Court of Human Rights in 2015 and 2017 for not having prevented and punished acts of torture by state agents. De Gennaro was prosecuted, convicted, and later cleared by Italy's Supreme Court of Cassation for inducing false testimonies.

In 2007, De Gennaro became Head of Cabinet for the Italian Ministry of Interior, and held the position of Special Commissioner for an emergency crisis related to waste in the Campania region. In June 2008, he became Director General of the Department of Security Information (DIS). In 2012, he became undersecretary to the Italian prime minister with responsibility for information services and security.

In July 2013, De Gennaro was appointed chairman of Finmeccanica (later became Leonardo) by the board of directors, with duties regarding International Relations, Institutional Relations, External Relations and Communication, Group Security and Internal Audit. In May 2014, De Gennaro was confirmed as Chairman by the Finmeccanica Board of Directors, and again in May 2017 when he was appointed to supervise the execution of corporate governance rules related to integrity in corporate behaviours and to fight corruption. Several politicians opposed De Gennaro's chairmanship of Leonardo/Finmeccanica due to his past in Genoa, including the then Democratic Party president Matteo Orfini, who deemed it "shameful", as well as other politicians from the Five Star Movement and Left Ecology Freedom.

== Later life and death ==
In November 2026, it was announced that de Gennaro was being investigated for obstructing the investigation into the 1992 Via D'Amelio bombing.

On 21 November, de Gennaro's body was found at his Montiano home with a self-inflicted gunshot wound. He was 78.

== Honors ==
| Award | Date |
|---|---|
| Knight of the Grand Cross of the Order of Merit of the Italian Republic | 2 June 2000 |
| Grand Officer of the Order of Merit of the Italian Republic | 27 December 1994 |
| Commander of the Order of Merit of the Italian Republic | 9 February 1993 |
| FBI's Medal of Meritorious Achievement | 8 December 2006 |
