= Gabriel Le Bras =

French legal scholar and sociologist

- Born: July 23, 1891; Paimpol, Côtes-d'Armor, Brittany, France
- Died: February 18, 1970 (aged 78); Paris, France
- Occupations: Jurist, sociologist

Gabriel Le Bras (1891-1970) was a French legal scholar and sociologist.

== Early life ==
Gabriel Le Bras was born on July 23, 1891, in Paimpol, France. He received a Doctorate and the Agrégation in Laws in 1922.

== Career ==
Le Bras was a professor of law at the University of Strasbourg from 1923 to 1929. He was director of research in the Sociology of Religion at the École pratique des hautes études from 1945 to 1962. He served as the Dean of the Law School at the University of Paris from 1959 to 1962.

Le Bras became a member of the Académie des Sciences Morales et Politiques in 1962.

== Publications ==
- (with Paul Fournier), Histoire des collections canoniques en occident depuis les Fausses Décrétales jusqu'au Décret de Gratien, 2 vol., Paris, 1931; 1932.
- with Jean Gaudemet (dir.), Histoire du droit et des institutions de l'Église en Occident, Paris, Sirey, 18 vol. (including Prolégomènes, Paris, 1955)
- Introduction à l'histoire de la pratique religieuse en France, 2 vol., Paris, 1942; 1945. (read online).
- Études de sociologie religieuse, 2 vol., Paris, PUF, "Bibliothèque de Sociologie contemporaine", 1955; 1956.
- Institutions ecclésiastiques de la Chrétienté médiévale, 2 vol., Paris, Bloud & Gay, 1959; 1964.
- with Charles Lefebvre and J. Rambaud, L'Âge classique (1140–1378). Sources et théorie du droit, Paris, Sirey, 1965.
- L'Église et le village, Paris, Flammarion, 1976.
- La Police religieuse dans l'ancienne France, Paris, Fayard, 2010. (Read online).

== Bibliography on Le Bras ==
- Études d'histoire du droit canonique dédiées à Gabriel Le Bras, Paris, Sirey, 1965, 2 vol.
- Francine Soubiran-Paillet. "Juristes et sociologues français d'après-guerre : une rencontre sans lendemain", Genèses. Sciences sociales et histoire, 2000, n° 1, p. 125-142.
- Dominique Julia, "Un passeur de frontières : Gabriel Le Bras et l'enquête sur la pratique religieuse en France", RHEF, 92, 2006, p. 381-413.
- Raoul C. Van Caenegem, Legal historians I have known: a personal memoir, in: Rechtsgeschichte, Zeitschrift des Max-Planck Instituts für europäische Rechtsgeschichte, 2010, S.252-299.
