= Ada Becchi =

Italian politician (1937–2025)

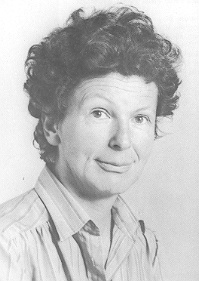

Member of the Italian Chamber of Deputies
- In office 2 July 1987 – 22 April 1992
- Constituency: Legislature X of Italy

Personal details
- Born: Ada Becchi; 30 May 1937 Turin, Italy
- Died: 25 September 2025 (aged 88) Rome, italy
- Party: Italian Communist Party
- Other political affiliations: Independent Left
- Education: University of Genoa

Ada Becchi (30 May 1937 – 25 September 2025) was an Italian politician and economist.

== Biography ==
She grew up in Genoa, where she completed her studies (high school and a degree in economics from the University of Genoa). During her university years, she collaborated with the Institute of Studies directed by Luciano Cavalli.

After graduating, she was hired by Ilva (later Italsider), where she worked on social interventions related to the construction of the Taranto plant. She worked as a volunteer assistant for the Industrial Techniques department at the Faculty of Economics.

In 1963, she moved to the capital city Rome, where she began a collaboration with the research institute ISVET. She contributed to research on income policies and intervention in Southern Italy.

From 1965 to 1968, she also collaborated with the Committee of Ministers for Southern Italy. In the early 1970s, he founded the journal "Archivio di studi urbani e regionali" (Archive of Urban and Regional Studies) with Paolo Ceccarelli, Francesco Indovina, and others.

From 1969 to 1977, she was head of the FIOM-CGIL research office. In 1973, she was appointed professor at the Faculty of Economics at the University of Urbino (Ancona campus), and in 1977, she also became a professor at the University Institute of Architecture in Venice. Her tenure at the IUAV ended with her retirement in 2009. In the 1980s and 1990s, she collaborated with the University of Urbino.

She was elected to the Chamber of Deputies on the PCI list in 1987. She joined the Independent Left parliamentary group, of which she was group leader from 31 March 1991. In 1989, she was part of the shadow government of the Italian Communist Party as head of "Housing and Territory". After her parliamentary experience, she served for a short time (1993-1994) as deputy mayor and councilor in the Municipality of Naples (Bassolino administration).

In the early 1990s, she coordinated training and research on the criminal economy at the Italian Foreign Exchange Office at the Bank of Italy.

In recent years she edited the Italian translation of two books by Ben Steil: The Battle of Bretton Woods (Donzelli editore, 2013) and The Marshall Plan: the Origins of the Cold War (Donzelli editore, 2018).

Ada Becchi died in 2025.

== Main publications ==
- 1965, Il Mezzogiorno verso la programmazione, in Aa.Vv. Meridionalismo in crisi?, Angeli editore.
- 1968, Sviluppo economico e crescita urbana in Italia, Angeli editore.
- 1975, La formazione dei gruppi dirigenti delle imprese pubbliche, in Annali Feltrinelli, Feltrinelli.
- 1978, Sussidi lavoro Mezzogiorno, Angeli editore.
- 1979, Politiche del lavoro e garanzia del reddito in Italia, Il Mulino.
- 1982, L'organizzazione imprenditoriale, in Manuale delle relazioni industriali, Il Mulino.
- 1984, Napoli miliardaria. Economia e lavoro dopo il terremoto, Angeli editore.
- 1986, Transizione industriale e delle relazioni industriali: il caso Fiat, Angeli editore - con S. Negrelli.
- 1990, Opere pubbliche, "Meridiana", n. 9.
- 1993, Proibito? Il mercato mondiale della droga - Donzelli Editore - con M. Turvani
- 1994, L'economia criminale - Editori Laterza - con G. M. Rey
- 1994, Napoli vista dal comune, "Meridiana", n. 21.
- 2000, Criminalità organizzata. Paradigmi e scenari delle organizzazioni mafiose in Italia - Donzelli Editore.
- 2001, Professionisti e mediatori per una riforma delle libere professioni - Donzelli Editore.
- 2016, La città del XXI secolo. Ragionando con Bernardo Secchi, Angeli editore - con altri autori.
- 2019 - L'autunno caldo. Cinquant'anni dopo - Donzelli Editore - con Sangiovanni
