= Giovanni Cervetti =

Italian politician (1933–2026)

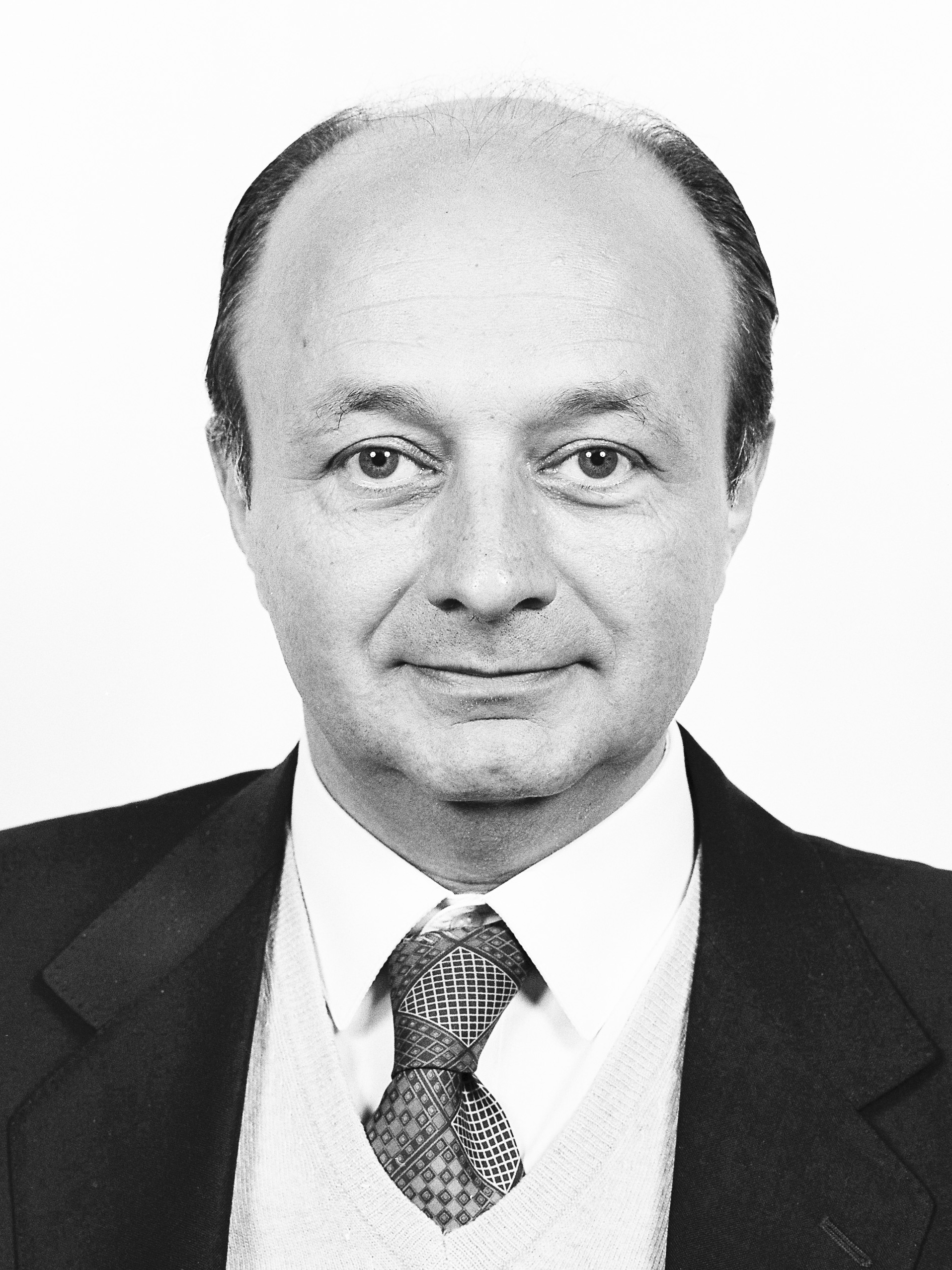
- Cervetti in 1984

Member of the Chamber of Deputies of Italy for Lombardy
- In office 2 July 1987 – 14 April 1994

Member of the European Parliament for Italy
- In office 24 July 1984 – 24 July 1989

Personal details
- Born: 12 September 1933 Milan, Italy
- Died: 7 May 2026 (aged 92) Milan, Italy
- Party: PCI
- Education: Moscow State University
- Occupation: Journalist

Giovanni Cervetti (12 September 1933 – 7 May 2026) was an Italian politician of the Italian Communist Party.

Cervetti served as a member of the European Parliament from 1984 to 1989. He was also a member of the Chamber of Deputies from 1987 to 1994.

Cervetti died in Milan on 7 May 2026, at the age of 92.
