= Magliano in Toscana =

- Comune
- Comune di Magliano in Toscana
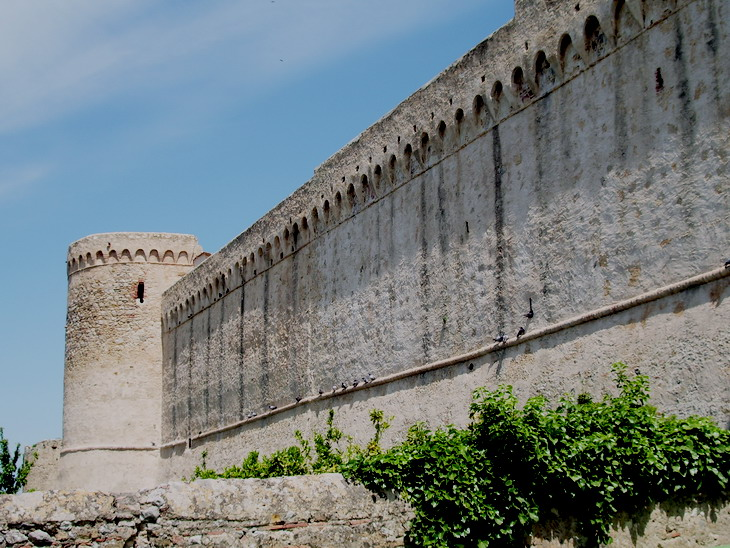
- Town wall in Magliano in Toscana

- Coat of arms

- Location within Italy Location within Tuscany
- Coordinates: 42°35′N 11°17′E
- Country: Italy
- Region: Tuscany
- Province: Grosseto (GR)
- Frazioni: Montiano, Pereta

Government
  - Mayor: Gabriele Fusini

Area
  - Total: 250.78 km^{2} (96.83 sq mi)
- Elevation: 128 m (420 ft)

Population (1 January 2022)
  - Total: 3,324
  - Density: 13.25/km^{2} (34.33/sq mi)
- Demonym: Maglianesi
- Time zone: UTC+1 (CET)
  - Summer (DST): UTC+2 (CEST)
- Postal code: 58051
- Dialing code: 0564
- Website: Official website

Magliano in Toscana is a comune (municipality) in the Province of Grosseto in the Italian region Tuscany, located about 130 kilometres (81 miles) south of Florence and about 25 kilometres (16 miles) southeast of Grosseto.

Magliano in Toscana borders the following municipalities: Grosseto, Manciano, Orbetello, Scansano.

Nearby was found the Lead Plaque of Magliano.

== Frazioni ==
The municipality is formed by the municipal seat of Magliano and the two villages (frazioni) of Montiano and Pereta.

== Notable people ==
- Walter Chielli (1925–1997), trade unionist and politician
- Adalberto Minucci (1932–2012), politician
- Giancarlo Tei (born 1961), politician
