= Aureliana Alberici =

Italian politician

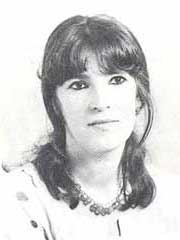

Member of the Senate of the Republic
- In office 24 June 1987 – 8 May 1996

Personal details
- Born: 16 September 1941 (age 83); Bologna, Italy
- Political party: Italian Communist Party; Democratic Party of the Left
- Spouse: Achille Occhetto (divorced)

Aureliana Alberici (born 16 September 1941) is an Italian academic and former politician. She served as a Senator for the Italian Communist Party and the Democratic Party of the Left from 1987 to 1996.

== Early life ==
Alberici was born on 16 September 1941 in Bologna. She attended the University of Bologna, receiving a degree and a lecturing qualification in pedagogics in 1996. She was a lecturer in pedagogics at the same university until 1986 when she began lecturing in adult education at La Sapienza University in Rome.

She served as the assessor for public instruction on the Bologna Council from 1975 to 1983. She was a member of the Italian Communist Party (PCI) and served as the national head of the school and university section of the PCI leadership from 1983 and as a member of the party's central committee.

== Political career ==
She was elected to the Senate of the Republic as a representative for the constituency of Bologna (III)–Imola in the 1987 general election. She was a member of the committee on public education and cultural heritage. She was also a member of the commission for the library and the parliamentary committee for the general direction and supervision of radio and television services. She was re-elected in the 1992 general election, where she remained a member of the committee on public education and cultural heritage. She became a member of the Democratic Party of the Left (PDS) on 27 April 1992 and was a member of the steering committee from 11 May 1992 to 14 April 1994. She was re-elected for a third time in the 1994 general election, where she remained a member of the committee on public education and cultural heritage. She became a member of the Progressive Federative Group on 18 April 1994 and was a member of the steering committee from 27 May 1994 to 8 May 1996. She also served on the parliamentary commission of inquiry into terrorism in Italy and the causes of the failure to identify those responsible for the massacres.

== Personal life ==
She was the third wife of the founder of the PDS, Achille Occhetto.
