= Pereta =

- Frazione
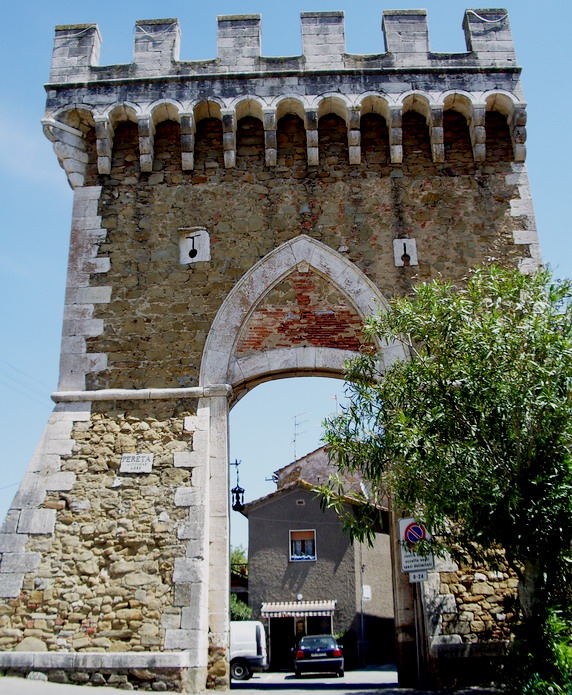
- Porta di Ponente, the main gate of Pereta

- Location of Pereta in Italy
- Coordinates: 42°38′42″N 11°19′19″E
- Country: Italy
- Region: Tuscany
- Province: Grosseto (GR)
- Comune: Magliano in Toscana
- Elevation: 283 m (928 ft)

Population (2011)
  - Total: 157
- Demonym: Peretani
- Time zone: UTC+1 (CET)
  - Summer (DST): UTC+2 (CEST)
- Postal code: 58051
- Dialing code: (+39) 0564

Pereta is a village in Tuscany, central Italy, administratively a frazione of the comune of Magliano in Toscana, province of Grosseto, in the area of Maremma. At the time of the 2001 census its population amounted to 182.

Pereta is about 36 km from Grosseto and 9 km from Magliano in Toscana, and it is situated along the Provincial Road which links Magliano with Scansano.

== Main sights ==
- San Giovanni Battista (13th century), main parish church of the village.
- Pieve di Santa Maria Assunta (15th century), it was restructured in the 19th century.
- Clock tower (15th century), the most ancient building in Pereta, because it is the only one which has never been restructured.
- Walls of Pereta, old fortifications which surround the village since the 13th century.
  - Porta di Ponente, main gate and access to the medieval village.

== Bibliography ==
- Aldo Mazzolai, Guida della Maremma. Percorsi tra arte e natura, Le Lettere, Florence, 1997.

== See also ==
- Magliano in Toscana
- Montiano, Magliano in Toscana
