= Documentation française =

La Documentation française is a French public publishing service of general documentation on major newsworthy problems for French administrations and the French public. It edits academic reports and studies of the French government as well as a publications of administrations and public bodies.

Since 2010, it has been a brand of the Department of Legal and Administrative Information (direction de l’Information légale et administrative, Dila), one of the service directorates of the Prime Minister operating under the authority of the Secretary-General of the Government (SGG). Until 2010, it was a standalone agency under the official name of direction de la Documentation française.

== See also ==
- Government of France
- Questions Internationales
