= Egle Becchi =

Italian pedagogist, historian, and academic (1930–2022)

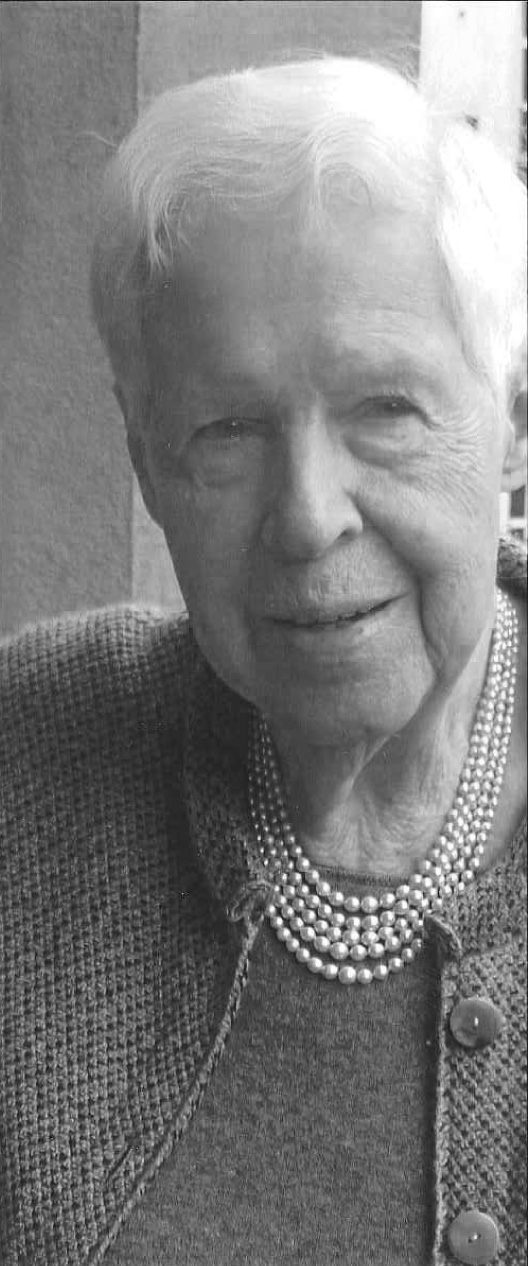
- Born: 21 May 1930; Trieste, Italy
- Died: 3 January 2022 (aged 91); Milan, Italy
- Occupation: pedagogist

Egle Becchi (21 May 1930 – 3 January 2022) was an Italian pedagogist, historian and academic. She was professor emeritus of philosophy at the University of Pavia.

== Life and career ==
After graduating in philosophy at the University of Milan, and after a few years teaching in her alma mater and at the University of Ferrara, she was professor of General Pedagogy and History of Education at the University of Pavia from 1976 to 2005.

Her early interests were towards psychopedagogy and later on experimentalist themes, then from the early seventies she mainly focused her work on the history of infancy, conducting researches on the condition and image of childhood in the past, even through the collection and analysis of childhood diaries. Among her major works there was the book Storia dell'infanzia, that she wrote in collaboration with the French historian Dominique Julia.

Becchi died on 3 January 2022, at the age of 91.

== Publications ==
- La pedagogia della ‘Gestalt’, La Nuova Italia, 1961
- Il bambino sociale. Privatizzazione e deprivatizzazione dell’infanzia, Feltrinelli, 1979
- (with B. Vertecchi, cured by), Manuale critico della sperimentazione e della ricerca educativa, FrancoAngeli, 1983
- Storia dell’educazione, La Nuova Italia, 1987
- I bambini nella storia, Laterza, 1994
- Manuale della scuola del bambino dai tre ai sei anni, FrancoAngeli, 1995
- (with D. Julia, cured by), Storia dell’infanzia, Laterza, 1996)
- Sperimentare nella scuola. Storia, problemi, prospettive, La Nuova Italia, 1997
- (with A. Bondioli, cured by), Valutare e valutarsi nelle scuole dell’infanzia del Comune di Pistoia. Un modello di formazione degli insegnanti, Edizioni Junior, 1997
- (with A. Semeraro, cured by), Archivi d’infanzia. Per una storiografia della prima età, La Nuova Italia, 2001
- Una pedagogia del buon gusto. Esperienze e progetti dei servizi per l’infanzia del comune di Pistoia, FrancoAngeli, 2010
- Maschietti e bambine. Tre storie con figure, ETS, 2011
