= Alessandro Natta =

Italian politician (1918–2001)

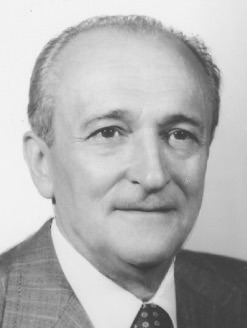

General Secretary of the Italian Communist Party
- In office 24 June 1984 – 10 June 1988
- Preceded by: Enrico Berlinguer
- Succeeded by: Achille Occhetto

President of the Italian Communist Party
- In office 22 March 1989 – 11 March 1990
- Preceded by: Luigi Longo
- Succeeded by: Aldo Tortorella

Member of the European Parliament
- In office 24 July 1984 – 24 July 1989
- Constituency: North-East Italy

Member of the Chamber of Deputies
- In office 8 May 1948 – 22 April 1992
- Constituency: Genoa

Personal details
- Born: 7 January 1918 Oneglia, Italy
- Died: 23 May 2001 (aged 83) Imperia, Italy
- Party: Italian Communist Party

Alessandro Natta (7 January 1918 – 23 May 2001) was an Italian politician and secretary of the Italian Communist Party (PCI) from 1984 to 1988. An illuminist, Jacobin, and communist, as he used to describe himself, Natta represented the political and cultural prototype of a PCI militant and party member for over fifty years of the Italian democratic-republican history. After joining the PCI in 1945, he was deputy from 1948 to 1992, a member of the PCI's central committee starting in 1956, was part of the direction from 1963 and of the secretariat, first from 1962 to 1970 and then from 1979 to 1983, and leader of the PCI parliamentary group from 1972 to 1979; he was also the director of Rinascita from 1970 to 1972. After 1991, he did not join the PCI's successor parties.

Described as a professor, intellectual, and grey, Natta was endowed with oratorical ability and cultural preparation. He was known for his moral rigour, loyalty to institutions, and cultural and political knowledge; he was more a reader of the classics and Benedetto Croce than Mikhail Suslov. His leadership of the PCI was marked by his oratorical ability and a partisan pride that did not fall into factionalism. As with the other PCI leaders, his private life was separated from his public life, with no compromising photos, glitz, worldliness, and in Gian Carlo Pajetta's words, never "words like horns and lover".

== Early life, education, and World War II ==
Natta was born in Oneglia, the sixth child of a family of merchants from the small bourgeoisie. His father, Antonio, was the owner of a small butcher's shop where his mother, Nannuccia, also worked. As a recently industrialised city in the early 20th century, it was bound by social inequalities that the newborn Italian Socialist Party (PSI) tried to answer; the city was a PSI stronghold, with workers, small traders, and small artisans sharing the hope for socialism. Natta's father was a socialist, and he came to share his support for egalitarianism and social justice. During his childhood, he received care from his sister Giuseppina, a teacher by profession, who played an important role in his cultural formation. He concluded his master's studies in 1935 and obtained the classical maturity in 1936.

From 1936 to 1941, Natta completed his humanist studies at the Scuola Normale Superiore di Pisa, where Carlo Azeglio Ciampi, a future president of Italy, Guido Calogero, and Antonio Maccanico, among others, also graduated. In that city, he began taking part in the opposition to Benito Mussolini's Italian fascist regime. During World War II, he was sent to Greece as an artillery lieutenant officer and was wounded in the Aegean, where he served as the station officer. In the chaos following the armistice with Italy with the Allies of World War II in 1943, he took part in the defence of Gaddurà airport in Rhodes from Nazi Germany attacks. Captured, he refused to collaborate with the Germans and the Italian Social Republic, and was consequently interned first in a prison camp on the island, then subsequently sent to a lager in Germany. Marked by this experience, he collected all his memories in an autobiographical volume in which he recalled the tragedy of the Italian Military Internees in the Nazi camps.

== Italian Communist Party ==
=== 1940s–1960s ===
In August 1945, Natta returned to Italy and politics, and joined the PCI in Imperia, dedicating himself to the party full-time. He continued to develop his father's socialist ideas. He was, in turn, a councillor for his native comune, secretary of the local PCI federation, and in time a leading participant in the party's internal life, becoming a member of its main organs along with Luigi Longo. During these years, the PCI was led by Palmiro Togliatti and was not a purely and solely Marxist–Leninist party, as in the twenty months of partisan struggle and resistance to fascism, it tried to combine the secular Risorgimento tradition of the struggle for the unification of Italy with the yearning socialist for social justice. It also started a dialogue with the part of the Catholic movement represented in the left wing of Christian Democracy (DC).

From 1946 to 1960, Natta was a municipal councilor of Imperia. In May 1948, he was elected member of the country's Chamber of Deputies in the Genoa–Imperia–La Spezia–Savona constituency on the lists of the Popular Democratic Front, an alliance of the PCI, PSI, and other left-wing parties to contest the 1948 Italian general election that was won by Alcide De Gasperi's DC. As a member of the PCI, he was re-elected in all subsequent elections, and remained a deputy for ten legislatures; he was the leader of the PCI's parliamentary group until 1979. He also directed the political and cultural magazine Rinascita.

During his political career, Natta was always elected in his native Italian region of Liguria and on the lists of the PCI, which would be the only political party of his career. Within the PCI, he completed the whole cursus honorum. In 1962 and 1963, he entered the party secretariat and directorate, respectively, where he remained until the party dissolution. He took the position of Togliatti but was a centrist, in the sense that he sought dialogue with all the other components of the party and the other democratic forces of the country, including lay people, Catholics, and other socialists. He was in favour of change and innovations but without passionate and irrational accelerations, and preferred prudence. It was in these years that Natta met Enrico Berlinguer, another dolphin of Togliatti who, upon the latter's death, became deputy secretary of the new leader Luigi Longo.

A strong supporter of the "Italian Road to Socialism", Natta was close to Berlinguer and gained a position in the party secretariat. Both Natta and Berlinguer shared the two pillars of Togliatti's "Italian Road to Socialism", namely the international independence of the PCI, which also included independence from the Soviet Union, and renewal in continuity. Like most of the leadership of the PCI, he was cold and hesitant towards the revolutionary flare and the protesters of 1968; the PCI feared its excesses and classified the young protesters as "bourgeois extremists". They were wary of these movements, which the PCI could not control, that openly contest the party. For the first time since the birth of the First Italian Republic, the PCI had competitors to its left. In 1969, he drew up the report proposing the expulsion from the party of the il manifesto group including Luigi Pintor, Aldo Natoli, Rossana Rossanda, and Lucio Magri, among others.

=== 1970s–1980s ===
In 1972, when Berlinguer succeeded Longo as the party leader, Natta became the new group leader of the PCI in the Chamber of Deputies. The assumption of this new position, as well as an increase in responsibilities and the possibility of showing off his oratory and political strategy skills, forced Natta to have to accept, due to safety reasons, a security escort and an official state car. Before that, Natta used public transport to get to the Chamber of Deputies. The 1970s were among the most difficult years in the history of the Italian Republic, and included terrorism (Years of Lead), massacres, and an economic crisis that was caused by the 1973 oil crisis, and affected the country and its democratic institutions. In the 1975–1976 period, the PCI reached its all-time high results, which led the DC to start a dialogue for cooperation. After the 1976 Italian general election, national solidarity governments headed by the DC leader Giulio Andreotti were formed. They were single-party governments that enjoyed the political abstention (third Andreotti government) and then the favourable vote (fourth Andreotti government) of the democratic parties of the political centre and of the political left, namely the PCI, the PSI, the Italian Democratic Socialist Party (PSDI), and the Italian Republican Party (PRI).

The period of national solidarity seemed to be the last step needed for the PCI's entry into government and the culmination of Berlinguer's Historic Compromise project dating back to 1972. The kidnapping and assassination of Aldo Moro by the Red Brigades put an end to this possibility. During the days of Moro's kidnapping, Natta was among the greatest supporters of the firm line (fronte della fermezza), which entailed no negotiations with the Red Brigades on the grounds that the state cannot and must not come to terms with terrorists. In the 1978 Italian presidential election, he was among those who would choose the new president, together with the leaders of the DC and the PRI, Benigno Zaccagnini and Ugo La Malfa, respectively); it was a fellow socialist and Ligurian, Sandro Pertini, who was elected to Italy's highest political office.

After the terrorist emergency and Moro's death, the national solidarity governments were followed by a five-party government formula, known as the Pentapartito, based on the preferential axis between the DC, which was hegemonised by the dorotei faction and centre-right components, and the PSI of Bettino Craxi's new decision-making course, while the other government partners (PSDI, PRI, and the Italian Liberal Party) were in a subordinate position, despite the rule between 1981 and 1982 of the first secular Prime Minister of Italy in the PRI's Giovanni Spadolini; the PCI was relegated to the parliamentary opposition. These were the years in which the struggle between the PCI and the PSI raged on the left and was the clash between the two leaders, Berlinguer and Craxi, as well as their ways of conceiving politics, that in the case of the PCI focused on morality and training as part of Berlinguer's moral question. Age and health issues pushed Natta near retirement before Berlinguer was struck by a stroke during a rally in Padua and died a few days later, just ahead of the 1984 European Parliament election in Italy, in an atmosphere of general mourning. For the first and only time in its history, the PCI was the most-voted party.

On 24 October 1984, months after Berlinguer's death, Natta was elected party secretary. While still following Berlinguer's party line, he tried to improve the party's tense relations with the Communist Party of the Soviet Union. To this end, he supported a trip to the Soviet Union organised by Armando Cossutta, which generated considerable controversy inside the party. In 1986, Natta was confirmed as leader during the party's congress in Florence. In 1988, he was forced to resign due to poor health, caused by a heart attack on the eve of an electoral rally for which he was hospitalised, and was succeeded by Achille Occhetto. This was also caused by political differences. He signed motion No. 2, which proposed to renovate the party's political culture without renouncing Marxism, and strongly opposed Occhetto's proposal in the historic Bolognina split to change the party's name, symbol, and orientation. Along with Pietro Ingrao, Giancarlo Pajetta, Aldo Tortorella, and Cossutta, he led the No Front (il fronte del no), which opposed the dissolution of the PCI.

== Later life and death ==
The dissolution of the PCI after Occhetto's victory was ultimately in 1991 and led to the birth of two different parties; the former PCI majority became the Democratic Party of the Left under Occhetto and the former PCI minority and hardliners joined to the Communist Refoundation Party (PRC) founded by Cossutta, Sergio Garavini, Lucio Libertini, and others. Natta did not join either party and retired from politics. Afterwards, his political commentary was increasingly rare but significant. In 1996, he hailed the victory of Romano Prodi's centre-left coalition that included The Olive Tree and PRC. In 1998, he criticised the decision of the PRC leader Fausto Bertinotti to remove confidence in the first Prodi government. Sick, elderly, and increasingly disappointed by Italian politics, Natta continued to withdraw more and more into his private life and memories. In the spring of 2001, another cardiocirculatory dysfunction led to his death. All major political representatives across the political spectrum remembered Natta as a great protagonist of Italy's democratic history.

== Electoral history ==
Election	House	Constituency	Party	Votes	Result
1948	Chamber of Deputies	Genoa–Imperia–La Spezia–Savona	FDP	51,772	Elected
1953	Chamber of Deputies	Genoa–Imperia–La Spezia–Savona	PCI	13,341	Elected
1958	Chamber of Deputies	Genoa–Imperia–La Spezia–Savona	PCI	22,859	Elected
1963	Chamber of Deputies	Genoa–Imperia–La Spezia–Savona	PCI	29,823	Elected
1968	Chamber of Deputies	Genoa–Imperia–La Spezia–Savona	PCI	29,050	Elected
1972	Chamber of Deputies	Genoa–Imperia–La Spezia–Savona	PCI	60,718	Elected
1976	Chamber of Deputies	Genoa–Imperia–La Spezia–Savona	PCI	103,897	Elected
1979	Chamber of Deputies	Genoa–Imperia–La Spezia–Savona	PCI	85,372	Elected
1983	Chamber of Deputies	Genoa–Imperia–La Spezia–Savona	PCI	80,160	Elected
1984	European Parliament	North-East Italy	PCI	213,247	Elected
1987	Chamber of Deputies	Genoa–Imperia–La Spezia–Savona	PCI	90,432	Elected

== Bibliography ==
- Cavalli, Luciano, ed. (1987). "Per una biografia politica di Alessandro Natta". Leadership e democrazia (in Italian). Padua: Cedam. ISBN 978-8-8131-6230-6.
- Devoto, Giorgio, ed. (2022). Alessandro Natta. Atti della giornata di studio 18 febbraio 2002 (in Italian). Genoa: San Marco dei Giustiniani. ISBN 978-8-8749-4079-0.
- Gandolfo, Andrea (2021). Bibliografia degli scritti di Alessandro Natta (in Italian). Rome: Aracne. ISBN 978-8-8255-4143-4.
- Turi, Paolo (1990). Natta e il Pci. Una biografia sociologica (in Italian). Florence: Interuniversity Center of Political Sociology.
- Turi, Paolo (1996). L'ultimo segretario. Vita e carriera di Alessandro Natta (in Italian). Padua: Cedam. ISBN 978-8-8131-9856-5.
- Speciale, Roberto (2017). Alessandro Natta. Una vita esemplare fra cultura e politica (in Italian). Genoa: De Ferrari. ISBN 978-8-8640-5881-8.
- Giulia, Strippoli (2013). "Alessandro Natta". Dizionario Biografico degli Italiani (in Italian). Vol. 78. Rome: Italian Encyclopedia Institute. ISBN 978-8-8120-0032-6.

Party political offices
Preceded by Enrico Berlinguer	Secretary of the Italian Communist Party; 1984–1988	Succeeded by Achille Occhetto
