= Aldo Tortorella =

Italian journalist, former politician and partisan (1926–2025)

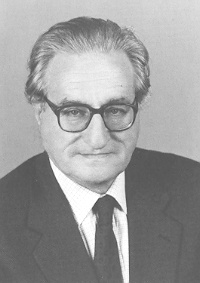

Member of the Chamber of Deputies
- In office 25 May 1972 – 14 April 1994
- Constituency: Milan (1972–1992); Genoa (1992–1994)

Personal details
- Born: 10 July 1926 Naples, Italy
- Died: 5 February 2025 (aged 98) Rome, Italy
- Party: PCI (till 1991); PDS (1991–1998); DS (1998–1999)
- Education: University of Milan
- Occupation: Journalist, politician

Aldo Tortorella (10 July 1926 – 5 February 2025) was an Italian journalist, politician and partisan. He was a historical member of the Italian Communist Party (Partito Comunista Italiano, or PCI).

== Life and career ==
Tortorella was born in Naples, but spent his youth in Genoa and Milan. When he was a university student, he became a member of the Milanese resistance movement against fascism. He was imprisoned, but he was later able to escape to Genoa. After the liberation of Northern Italy, Tortorella became journalist (and eventually vice-director) for the Genoese edition of PCI's newspaper, L'Unità. In 1958–1962 he was vice-director of the Milanese edition and director of the national edition from 1970 to 1975.

Tortorella was elected to the Italian Chamber of Deputies for the first time in 1972, a position he held until 1994. A follower of national secretary Enrico Berlinguer, he was the party's responsible for culture. In the late 1970s he was against Berlinguer's move towards the so-called Historic Compromise (Compromesso storico), which aimed for a government alliance between PCI and the other Italian main party of the period, Democrazia Cristiana.

In 1989, Tortorella was one of the main opponents of the Svolta della Bolognina, the change of PCI's name supported by new secretary Achille Occhetto. However, when PCI became the Democratic Party of the Left (PDS), he remained in the party as member of the left-current led by Giovanni Berlinguer. In 1999, at the outbreak of the Kosovo War, Tortorella abandoned the party in polemics with the then-prime minister and party leader, Massimo D'Alema, who had Italy take an active part in the conflict.

In 2000s, he contributed to a leftist magazine, Critica marxista, and organized cultural activities dealing with Enrico Berlinguer's figure and politics.

Tortorella died in Rome on 5 February 2025, at the age of 98.

== Electoral history ==
Election	House	Constituency	Party	Votes	Result
1972	Chamber of Deputies	Milan–Pavia	PCI	35,353	Elected
1976	Chamber of Deputies	Milan–Pavia	PCI	41,343	Elected
1979	Chamber of Deputies	Milan–Pavia	PCI	30,758	Elected
1983	Chamber of Deputies	Milan–Pavia	PCI	28,748	Elected
1987	Chamber of Deputies	Milan–Pavia	PCI	29,465	Elected
1992	Chamber of Deputies	Genoa–Imperia–La Spezia–Savona	PDS	14,041	Elected

== Sources ==
- Telese, Luca (2009). Qualcuno era comunista. Sperling & Kupfer.
