= Giulio Quercini =

Italian journalist and politician (1941–2023)

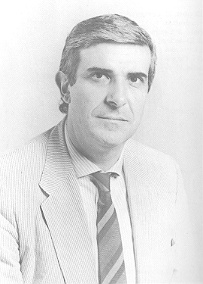
- Quercini, c. 1987–1992

Personal details
- Born: 16 December 1941 Siena, Kingdom of Italy
- Died: 3 October 2023 (aged 81) Florence, Italy
- Party: Italian Communist Party; Democratic Party of the Left
- Profession: Journalist

Giulio Quercini (16 December 1941 – 3 October 2023) was an Italian journalist and politician. He was a member of the Parliament for the Italian Communist Party (PCI) and Democratic Party of the Left (PDS).

== Early life and education ==
Quercini was born in Siena on 16 December 1941. He graduated from a high school in his hometown.

== Career ==
Immediately after his graduation Quercini got involved in politics and served as a member of the national secretariat of the Italian Communist Youth Federation, youth wing of the PCI. He was also the director of the magazine Nuova Generazione in the same period. He was elected as a member of the PCI's central committee in 1969. He was named as the secretary of the PCI's Catania branch in 1972. He became the regional secretary of the PCI in Tuscany in 1978 and was elected as a city councilor in Catania.

Quercini was elected as a city councilor in Catania in May 1985 and resigned from the post on 14 May 1987. Quercini was elected to the Parliament in 1987 from the Florence constituency. He was the group leader of the PCI in the Parliament. He continued to serve in the same post for the PSD which replaced the PCI in 1991. His term at the Parliament ended in April 1992.

Quercini was among the contributors of the Communist magazine Rinascita.

== Death ==
Quercini died in Florence on 3 October 2023 at the age of 81.
