= Montiano, Magliano in Toscana =

Montiano
- Frazione
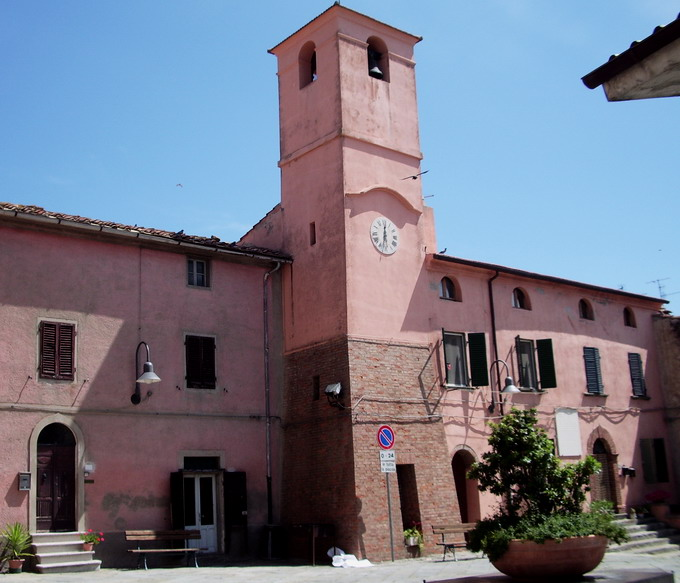
- The clock tower of Montiano

- Location of Montiano in Italy
- Coordinates: 42°38′47″N 11°13′25″E
- Country: Italy
- Region: Tuscany
- Province: Grosseto (GR)
- Comune: Magliano in Toscana
- Elevation: 260 m (850 ft)

Population (2011)
  - Total: 505
- Demonym: Montianesi
- Time zone: UTC+1 (CET)
  - Summer (DST): UTC+2 (CEST)
- Postal code: 58052
- Dialing code: (+39) 0564

Montiano is a village in Tuscany, central Italy, administratively a frazione of the comune of Magliano in Toscana, province of Grosseto, in the area of Maremma. At the time of the 2001 census its population amounted to 465.

Montiano is about 18 km from Grosseto and 9 km from Magliano in Toscana, and it is situated along the Provincial Road which links the two towns.

== Main sights ==
- San Giovanni Battista (13th century), main parish church of the village.
- San Giuseppe (16th century), it was restructured in the 19th century.
- Clock tower (12th century), former seat of Aldobrandeschi family and then town hall, it's now a private house.
- Castle of Montiano Vecchio, ruins of an ancient castle of the 12th century.
- Walls of Montiano, old fortifications which surround the village since the 13th century.

== Bibliography ==
- Aldo Mazzolai, Guida della Maremma. Percorsi tra arte e natura, Le Lettere, Florence, 1997.

== See also ==
- Magliano in Toscana
- Pereta
