= Rinascita =

Political magazine in Italy (1944–1991)

- Categories: Political magazine
- Frequency: Monthly; Weekly (from 1962)
- Founder: Palmiro Togliatti
- Founded: 1944
- Final issue: March 1991
- Country: Italy
- Based in: Rome
- Language: Italian
- OCLC: 222152942

Rinascita (Italian: Rebirth) was a political and cultural magazine published in Rome, Italy, between 1944 and March 1991. It was one of the media outlets of Italian Communist Party (PCI).

== History and profile ==
Rinascita was founded in 1944. The founder was Palmiro Togliatti, the leader of the PCI. He launched the magazine upon his return to Italy from exile in Moscow. He also edited the magazine until his death in 1964. Rinascita, published on a monthly basis, was headquartered in Rome. It was an official organ of the PCI.

Rinascita was established to serve as an ideological guide for militants and to revive the Marxist movement. It argued that the Communist Party had the most comprehensive vision about the nation's interests. The magazine attempted to develop a synthesis between Gramsci and Stalin. Following the death of Stalin in 1953, Rinascita described him as a perfect Marxist.

One of the frequent topics featured in Rinascita was the resistance against Fascists. It also published a special issue about the resistance, and Gisella Floreanini was among its contributors. The other leading contributors included Carlo Bernardini, Giovanni Berlinguer, Fausto Bertinotti and Giulio Quercini.

From 1962 Rinascita was published weekly. In the 1960s the magazine provided detailed analyses on the Sino-Soviet split. During the same period it featured many articles containing discussions about the relationship between socialism and democracy and between state and party. These articles, although written by different authors, commonly concluded that centralized rule, censorship, ideological dogmatism, and administrative coercion should be condemned.

The magazine frequently featured articles on environmental issues in the 1980s. Rinascita temporarily stopped publication due to the low circulation figures in the late 1980s. It was soon relaunched, but again ceased publication in March 1991. Alberto Asor Rosa was the last editor of the magazine.

== Directors ==
- Palmiro Togliatti (1944–1964)
- Gian Carlo Pajetta (14 October 1964 – 14 December 1966)
- Luca Pavolini (15 December 1966 – 1970)
- Alessandro Natta (1970–1972)
- Gerardo Chiaromonte (1972–1975)
- Alfredo Reichlin (1975–1977)
- Adalberto Minucci (1977–1979)
- Luciano Barca (1979–1983)
- Giuseppe Chiarante (1983–1986)
- Romano Ledda (30 April 1986 – 26 March 1987)
- Franco Ottolenghi (29 July 1987 – 30 July 1989)
- Alberto Asor Rosa (31 July 1989 – 24 February 1991)
- Goffredo Bettini (Editorial Director); Federico Lobuono (Editor-in-Chief) (since 22 November 2025)
