= 1985 Italian wage referendum =

9 June 1985
- Freeze the sliding wage scale by 3 points.

Results
Choice	Votes	%
Yes	15,460,855	45.68%
No	18,384,788	54.32%
Valid votes	33,845,643	96.81%
Invalid or blank votes	1,113,761	3.19%
Total votes	34,959,404	100.00%
Registered voters/turnout	44,904,290	77.85%

A referendum to restore the sliding wage scale was held in Italy on 9 June 1985.

It was defeated by margin of 54.3% to 45.7%.

== Background ==
A sliding wage scale, which allowed for the automatic adjustment of the salaries of Italian workers at the same rate as inflation, had been extended to most industries between 1975 and 1977.

This mechanism was blamed for the persistent high inflation environment of the early 1980s, which reached a 20% annual rate and was considered an example of a wage-price spiral. In February 1984 Socialist Prime Minister Bettino Craxi issued the first of a number of decrees that aimed to strongly reduce the indexation.

A referendum to repeal these measures was promoted by the Italian Communist Party. Those voting "yes" wanted to restore the full indexation system, while those voting "no" wanted to retain the recent changes.

== Political party positions ==
In addition to the Communist Party, which was the main promoter, the repeal of the Craxi laws and restoration of the sliding wage scale was supported by the far-left Proletarian Democracy and Federation of the Greens, the Sardinian Action Party, and the neo-fascist Italian Social Movement.

The main opponents of the repeal were the five government parties, the so-called Pentapartito.

Among labour unions the repeal was supported by a majority of the Communist-dominated CGIL, and opposed by the Catholic CISL and secular UIL.

== Results ==
Results of the referendum by province. Blue indicates a major in favour; red indicates a majority against.

Choice	Votes	%
For repealing the law	15,460,855	45.7
Against repealing the law	18,384,788	54.3
Invalid/blank votes	1,113,761	–
Total	34,959,404	100
Registered voters/turnout	44,904,290	77.9
Source: Nohlen & Stöver

The referendum was considered a major victory for Craxi and a mark of declining influence for the Communist Party.

The sliding wage scale would eventually be abolished in all forms in 1992.
