= Adalberto Minucci =

Italian journalist and politician

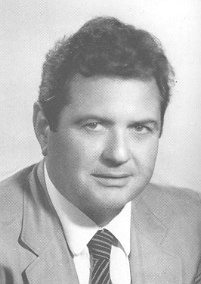

Member of the Chamber of Deputies
- In office 12 July 1983 – 22 April 1992

Member of the Senate
- In office 23 April 1992 – 14 April 1994

Mayor of Orbetello
- In office 6 June 1993 – 27 April 1997
- Preceded by: Fidenzio Belmonti
- Succeeded by: Rolando Di Vincenzo

Personal details
- Born: 4 March 1932; Magliano in Toscana, Province of Grosseto, Kingdom of Italy
- Died: 20 September 2012 (aged 80); Rome, Lazio, Italy
- Political party: PCI (1950-1991); PDS (1991-1998); PdCI (1998-2012)
- Occupation: Journalist

Adalberto Minucci (4 March 1932 – 20 September 2012) was an Italian journalist and politician who served as Deputy (1983–1992), Senator (1992–1994), and mayor of Orbetello (1993–1997).
