= Historic Compromise =

1970s political accommodation in Italy

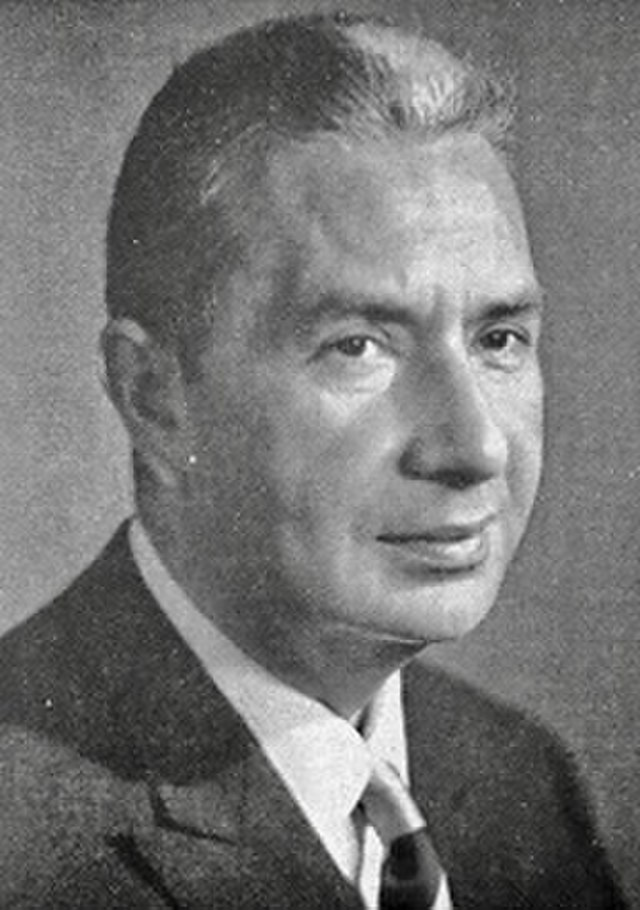
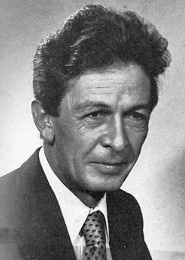
Prominent Christian Democracy member Aldo Moro (pictured left) and Italian Communist Party leader Enrico Berlinguer, the main architects of the Historic Compromise.

The Historic Compromise (Italian: compromesso storico), also known as the Third Phase (Italian: terza fase) or the Democratic Alternative (Italian: alternativa democratica), was a historical political accommodation between Christian Democracy (DC) and the Italian Communist Party (PCI) in the 1970s. The political accommodation was formalised between the two party leaders of the two parties, the PCI general secretary Enrico Berlinguer and the DC secretary Aldo Moro. Berlinguer envisioned it within the context of the 1973 Chilean coup d'état, while Moro wanted Italy to change from a dominant-party system into one of political alternance like the other Western countries.

Both parties saw the Historical Compromise within the context of an emergency period of the chaotic and crisis-afflicted 1970s, and the two governments under the agreement were known as the "government of non no-confidence" and the "government of national solidarity". The agreement also came when the PCI reached its political apex in the 1976 Italian general election and it was thought it was only a matter of time before it overcame the DC and became the largest party in the Italian Parliament.

The kidnapping and murder of Moro and disagreements and dissatisfaction within both parties ultimately led to the demise of the agreement and the PCI would never enter the Italian government. By 1980, the DC's leadership opposed to the agreement won out and Berlinguer announced the end of the Historical Compromise. Within the party system in the history of the Italian Republic, and of the First Italian Republic in particular, it was preceded by the organic centre-left of the 1960s, which saw three governments led by Moro, and was succeeded by the Pentapartito that would dominate the 1980s and early 1990s.

== History ==
=== Background ===
In 1973, Berlinguer launched a three-article proposal in the communist magazine Rinascita calling for a "democratic alliance" with the DC, embraced by Moro. One factor that inspired this proposal was the coup d'état in 1973 that overthrew the democratic-elected Allende government and ended the Presidential Republic era. For Berlinguer, the events in Chile proved that the Marxist left could not aspire to govern in democratic countries without establishing alliances with more moderate forces.

Another major reason for the change in PCI policy was the advent of the 1973 oil crisis that challenged the Western welfare states and would ultimately provide the pretext for neoliberalism. Not only could the crisis endanger welfare spending, but the PCI feared it could even threaten the fragile liberal democracy as a whole, in the same way that the Wall Street crash of 1929 and the Great Depression had given way to Nazism and ultimately to the Second World War. Cultural historian Stephen Gundle remarked that the party had legitimate reasons to fear a resurgence of fascist authoritarianism due to the terrorist strategy of tension employed during the Years of Lead, along with the increasing electoral strength of both the centre-right and far-right. The PCI aimed to participate in government to at least consolidate the gains of the previous decades and structurally entrench the Italian road to socialism. This could even "be seen as orthodoxy" because it was in line with the post-war coalition governments that followed long-time PCI leader Palmiro Togliatti's Salerno Turn in 1944.

=== Cooperation and government of non-no-confidence ===
The cooperation between the PCI and the DC grew into an ambivalent political alliance in 1976, with Prime Minister Moro including Berlinguer in an emergency meeting with Italy's political party leaders on 17 March 1976 to discuss averting the collapse of the economy. This replaced a governing alliance between the DC and the other centre-left parties known as the organic centre-left. Berlinguer's PCI attempted to distance itself from the Soviet Union with the launching of Eurocommunism along with the Communist Party of Spain and the French Communist Party. The compromise was unpopular among the other centre-left groups like the Italian Republican Party (PRI) and Italian Socialist Party (PSI), led respectively by Ugo La Malfa and Bettino Craxi. The right-wing Christian Democrat Giulio Andreotti also had doubts about the accommodation.

Some communist sympathizers or PCI members were estranged by the PCI's "refusal to consider the possibility of the exclusion of the DC from power", which seemed to indicate the PCI had moved beyond mere tactics and had entirely committed itself to collaboration with the DC. Even inside the PCI leadership, there was uncertainty about what the compromise would entail due to its overall vagueness and lack of a clear programme. Former party secretary Luigi Longo criticised it while discussing the 1975 Italian regional elections, stating that the proposed alliance was "enigmatic and ambiguous, and this ambiguity probably contributed to our electoral success, but the proposal remains impracticable and will lead us into passivity." Lucio Magri observed that Berlinguer "enjoyed unlimited trust" in the ranks of his party, and was not rebuked when he moved to the right on such sensitive topics as Italian NATO membership.

In the aftermath of the 1976 Italian general election, the PCI started to provide external support to a DC one-party government led by Andreotti. This minority government (the DC had achieved a score of 38,8%) derived its legitimacy simply from the promise of the PCI and the PSI to refrain from declaring no confidence in it. Despite official PCI support, several radical communists in the PCI boycotted the DC government. There was an increase in far-left terrorism, mainly committed by the Red Brigades (Italian: Brigate Rosse, BR). In response to this, the PCI started supporting repressive police measures. Criminologist Phil Edwards observed that this further damaged its anti-establishment credentials, stating: "Rather than a principled loyalty to the constitution on which the Italian state had been founded, the party now appeared to stand for unconditional loyalty to the state as it was."

=== End of the compromise ===
The BR kidnapped Moro, the then party president of the DC, on 16 March 1978. After several consultations in the Italian Parliament, the government refused the terrorists' conditions, and Moro was killed on 9 May 1978. Nevertheless, the Historic Compromise continued but was in decline, although it resulted in the election of the first left-wing president of Italy in Sandro Pertini of the PSI in August 1978.

At the DC's Fourteenth Congress in 1980, the DC's moderate wing (the Democratic Initiative, Dorothean, and New Force factions) won with an anti-communist programme, obtaining 57.7% of the vote, while the DC's conservative wing and Andreotti's faction Spring obtained 42.3% with a pro-Historic Compromise program. The new DC secretary became Flaminio Piccoli, a Dorothean, and the Historic Compromise was discontinued. It was replaced with the DC's political alliance with the other centre-left parties known as the Pentapartito. The PCI also started distancing itself from the Historic Compromise on its Fifteenth Congress in 1979. On 28 November 1980 in Salerno, Berlinguer officially announced the policy's demise.

== See also ==
- Grand coalition (Germany)
