= Questions Internationales =

Bimonthly French magazine

- Type: Bimonthly
- Publisher: La Documentation française
- Editor-in-chief: Serge Sur
- Founded: 2003; 23 years ago
- Headquarters: Paris
- Circulation: 6,000
- ISSN: 1761-7146
- Website: Questions Internationales

Questions Internationales (French for International Issues) is a bimonthly French magazine founded in 2003 and published by La Documentation française.

It offers didactic analysis on various subjects of international relations and foreign affairs, encompassing global politics, economics, European integration and transnational problems.

Questions Internationales is popular among students, scholars, diplomats and teachers as well as among a large public. Each issue consists of a main dossier dedicated to a major topic of International relations, European affairs, a transnational or a regional matter. Each dossier is illustrated by maps and photographs. In addition to the major articles written by scholars and specialists, each issue includes short articles and photographs.

Each magazine issue includes:

- A file dealing with a theme of international news or a major strategic issue or a geographic area. It is made up of substantive articles written by some of the biggest names in international relations and supplemented by boxes and a dozen cards or graphics;
- A section of "European questions" with contributions on news from European countries or the life of European Union institutions;
- A "Regards sur le Monde" section with the analysis of country or topical subjects;
- Alternating sections "Qi stories" devoted to certain major historical events, "IQ portraits" devoted to personalities who have marked the history of international relations or "Qi on screen" interested in international relations seen through cinema;
- A "Reference Documents" section highlighting one or more unpublished historical documents.

== Some authors ==
- Ezra Suleiman
- Georges Corm
- Charles Cogan
- Alain Dejammet
- Stella Ghervas
- G. John Ikenberry
- Daniel C. Kurtzer
- Yves Lacoste
- Emmanuel Le Roy Ladurie
- Jacques Marseille
- Thierry de Montbrial
- Philippe Moreau-Defarges
- Elias Sanbar
- Saskia Sassen
- Michel Serres
- Jack Snyder
- Georges-Henri Soutou
- Joanna Spear
- Justin Vaisse
- Hubert Védrine
