= Dominique Julia =

French historian

- Born: 1940 (age 85–86)
- Education: École Normale Supérieure
- Occupation: Historian

Dominique Julia (born 1940) is a 20th and 21st-century French historian. He is mainly interested in the periods of the Ancien Régime and the French Revolution, as well as the history of religions and the history of education.

== Biography ==
Dominique Julia is an alumnus of the École normale supérieure (class of 1960 Lettres) and is agrégé d'histoire.

He was director of research at the CNRS and taught at the European University Institute in Florence (1990-1994). He directed the Centre d'anthropologie religieuse européenne (EHESS) from 1994 to 2005, in tandem with Philippe Boutry.

He is one of France's leading specialists in the history of education under the Ancien Régime. His work on the history of French colleges, from monographic studies to the large dictionary of colleges co-edited with his wife Marie-Madeleine Compère, makes him one of the most internationally recognized researchers in the field.

At the same time, he worked on the clergy, then on the religious history of Catholicism before the French Revolution. Two collections of works, one devoted to education, the other to pilgrimages, bring together his principal works, carried out over fifty years of research.

The Académie des Sciences Morales et Politiques awarded her the Madeleine-Laurain-Portemer prize in 2017 for her body of work.

== Parcours ==
Dominique Julia is a former student of the École normale supérieure (class 1960 Lettres) and agrégé d'histoire. He was research director at the CNRS and has taught at the European University Institute at Florence. His work Une institution révolutionnaire et ses élèves was the culmination of twenty years of research.

== Publications (selection) ==
- 1988: L'éducation des ecclésiastiques aux XVIIe et XVIIIe siècles (article) on Persée
- 1991: Enfance et citoyenneté. Bilan historiographique et perspectives de recherches sur l'éducation et l'enseignement pendant la période révolutionnaire. (Deuxième partie) (article) on Persée
- 2000: BOUTRY Philippe, JULIA Dominique (s.d.), Pèlerins et pèlerinages dans l’Europe moderne, École française de Rome, Paris : Éditions de Boccard, 519 p.
- 2016: Le Voyage aux saints. Les pèlerinages dans l'Occident moderne (XVe-XVIIIe siècle), Paris, Éditions du Seuil, 384 p. ISBN 978-2-02-129569-6
