= Achille Occhetto =

Italian politician (born 1936)

Achille Leone Occhetto
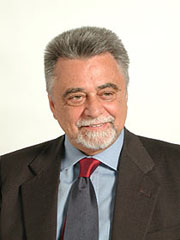
- Occhetto in 2001.

General Secretary of the Italian Communist Party
- In office 21 June 1988 – 3 January 1991
- Preceded by: Alessandro Natta
- Succeeded by: Position abolished

Secretary of the Democratic Party of the Left
- In office 8 February 1991 – 14 June 1994
- Preceded by: Position established
- Succeeded by: Massimo D'Alema

Member of the Senate of the Republic
- In office 30 May 2001 – 27 April 2006
- Constituency: Calabria

Member of the European Parliament
- In office 8 May 2006 – 28 March 2007
- Constituency: Southern Italy
- In office 25 July 1989 – 11 October 1998
- Constituency: North-West Italy

Member of the Chamber of Deputies
- In office 5 July 1976 – 29 May 2001
- Constituency: Palermo (1976–1992); Rome (1992–1994); Bologna (1994–2001)

Personal details
- Born: 3 March 1936 (age 90) Turin, Italy
- Party: PCI (1953–1991); PDS (1991–1998); DS (1998–2007); SD (2007–2009); SEL (2009–2016)
- Spouses: Ines Ravelli (sep. 1968) Elisa Kadigia Bove (divorced) Aureliana Alberici (divorced)
- Children: 2

Achille Leone Occhetto (Italian pronunciation: [aˈkille okˈketto]; born 3 March 1936) is an Italian politician. He served as the last secretary-general of the Italian Communist Party (PCI) between 1988 and 1991, and was the first leader of the Democratic Party of the Left (PDS), the parliamentary socialist successor of the PCI, from 1991 to 1994.

== Early life and career ==
Occhetto was born in Turin. He served as secretary of the Italian Communist Youth Federation, to which he had belonged starting from 1953, from 1963 to 1966. Subsequently, he was the regional secretary of the PCI in Sicily, where he distinguished himself for his war against any kind of mafia.

In 1986, Occhetto was appointed as national coordinator of the PCI and became its secretary in 1988, succeeding Alessandro Natta. Under his leadership, the party witnessed the collapse of both the Berlin Wall and the Soviet Union. He responded by declaring the Communist state experience over, and persuaded the PCI to dissolve and refound itself as a democratic socialist party, the PDS. This political shift, known in Italian politics as the Svolta della Bolognina (the name derives from the celebration of a partisan battle in World War II), during which he announced that the PCI would change its name, logo, and orientation, was accepted by approximately 70% of the members at the 20th National Congress held on 8 February 1991.

In 1994, Occhetto challenged and was defeated by Silvio Berlusconi in the 1994 Italian general election, leading the Alliance of Progressives; because of this loss, he resigned as party secretary. He returned to politics in the 2004 European Parliament election in Italy, being elected to the European Parliament on a joint ticket with anti-corruption campaigner Antonio Di Pietro; he immediately resigned and was replaced by Giulietto Chiesa. After the 2006 Italian general election, he returned to the European Parliament by taking up one of the seats vacated by an elected deputy, and sat as an Independent member of the Party of European Socialists group. In 2009, he joined the new left-wing formation Left Ecology Freedom. He is an atheist.

== Personal life ==
Occhetto was married to the activist and former actress Elisa Kadigia Bove, with whom he had two sons, Malcolm and Massimiliano (both born in Sicily); he was later married to fellow party member Aureliana Alberici.

== Electoral history ==
Election	House	Constituency	Party	Votes	Result
1976	Chamber of Deputies	Palermo–Trapani–Agrigento–Caltanissetta	PCI	67,134	Elected
1979	Chamber of Deputies	Palermo–Trapani–Agrigento–Caltanissetta	PCI	45,563	Elected
1983	Chamber of Deputies	Palermo–Trapani–Agrigento–Caltanissetta	PCI	51,144	Elected
1987	Chamber of Deputies	Palermo–Trapani–Agrigento–Caltanissetta	PCI	76,368	Elected
1989	European Parliament	North-West Italy	PCI	533,077	Elected
1992	Chamber of Deputies	Rome–Viterbo–Latina–Frosinone	PDS	143,905	Elected
1994	Chamber of Deputies	Bologna – Borgo Panigale	PDS	52,997	Elected
1994	European Parliament	North-West Italy	PDS	378,088	Elected
1996	Chamber of Deputies	Bologna – Borgo Panigale	PDS	58,632	Elected
2001	Senate of the Republic	Calabria – Cosenza	DS	49,596	Elected
2004	European Parliament	North-West Italy	IdV	13,857	Not elected

=== First-past-the-post elections ===
1994 general election (C): Bologna – Borgo Panigale
Candidate	Coalition or Party	Votes	%
Achille Occhetto	Progressives (PDS)	52,997	59.8
Pier Ferdinando Casini	Pole of Freedoms (CCD)	17,925	20.2
Anselmo Ruocco	National Alliance	7,388	8.3
Maria Gualandi	Pact for Italy (PPI)	7,133	8.0
Oliviero Toscani	Pannella List	3,225	3.6
Total		88,668	100.0
Turnout		91,571	95.0

1996 general election (C): Bologna – Borgo Panigale
Candidate	Coalition or Party	Votes	%
Achille Occhetto	The Olive Tree (PDS)	58,632	69.9
Gian Luca Galletti	Pole for Freedoms (CCD)	25,293	30.1
Total		83,925	100.0
Turnout		88,380	93.2

Party political offices
Preceded by Alessandro Natta	General Secretary of the Italian Communist Party; 1988–1991	Succeeded by Position abolished
Preceded by Position established	Secretary of the Democratic Party of the Left; 1991–1994	Succeeded by Massimo D'Alema
