= Italian Communist Party =

Political party in Italy (1921–1991)

Italian Communist Party Partito Comunista Italiano
- Abbreviation: PCI
- Secretary: Amadeo Bordiga (first); Achille Occhetto (last)
- President: Luigi Longo (first); Aldo Tortorella (last)
- Founded: 21 January 1921; 105 years ago (Note: The official change of the party's name to the Italian Communist Party was 15 May 1943; 83 years ago.)
- Dissolved: 3 February 1991; 35 years ago
- Split from: Italian Socialist Party
- Succeeded by: Democratic Party of the Left (official successor); Communist Refoundation Party (splinter group)
- Headquarters: Via delle Botteghe Oscure 4, Rome
- Newspaper: l'Unità
- Youth wing: Italian Communist Youth Federation
- Membership (1947): 2,252,446
- Ideology: Communism (Italian); Marxism-Leninism (from 1930s to 1970s); Democratic socialism (since 1970s)
- Political position: Left-wing to far-left
- National affiliation: National Liberation Committee (1943–1947); Popular Democratic Front (1947–1948); PCI–PSIUP (1966–1973)
- Regional affiliation: Progressive Socialist Organizations of the Mediterranean
- European Parliament group: Communist and Allies Group (1973–1989); European United Left (1989–1991)
- International affiliation: Communist International (1921–1943); Cominform (1947–1956)
- Colours: Red
- Anthem: Bandiera Rossa ("Red Flag")"

Party flag

The Italian Communist Party (Italian: Partito Comunista Italiano, PCI) was a communist and later democratic socialist political party in Italy. It was established in Livorno as the Communist Party of Italy (Italian: Partito Comunista d'Italia, PCd'I) on 21 January 1921, when it seceded from the Italian Socialist Party (PSI), under the leadership of Amadeo Bordiga, Antonio Gramsci, and Nicola Bombacci. Outlawed under the fascist regime, the party continued to operate underground and played a major role in the Italian resistance movement before and during World War 2. The party's Italian road to socialism ideology, the planned realisation of the communist project through democracy, repudiated the use of violence and applied the Constitution of Italy in all its parts. This was a strategy inaugurated under Palmiro Togliatti but that some date back to Gramsci, and would become the leitmotif of the party's history from then on.

Having changed its name in 1943, the PCI became the second largest political party of Italy after World War II, attracting the support of about a third of the vote share during the 1970s. At the time, it was the largest communist party in the Western world, with peak support reaching 2.3 million members in 1947, and peak share being 34.4% of the vote (12.6 million votes) in the 1976 Italian general election. The PCI was part of the Constituent Assembly of Italy and the Italian government from 1944 to 1947, when the United States ordered the removal of the PCI and PSI from government. The PCI–PSI alliance lasted until 1956, when the latter critised the former's support for the Soviet intervention in Hungary; the two parties continued to govern together in several local and regional contexts until the 1990s. Apart from the 1944–1947 years and occasional external support to the organic centre-left (1960s–1970s), which included the PSI, the PCI always remained in the opposition in the Italian Parliament, with more accommodation as part of the Historic Compromise of the 1970s, which ended in 1980, until its dissolution in 1991, not without controversy and much debate among its members.

The PCI included Marxist–Leninists and revisionists, with a notable social-democratic faction being the miglioristi. Under the leadership of Enrico Berlinguer and the influence of the miglioristi in the 1970s and 1980s, Marxism–Leninism was removed from the party statute and the PCI adhered to the Eurocommunist trend, seeking independence from the Soviet Union and moving in a democratic-socialist direction. In 1991, it was dissolved and re-launched as the Democratic Party of the Left (PDS), which joined the Socialist International and the Party of European Socialists. More radical members seceded to establish the Communist Refoundation Party (PRC).

== History ==
=== Early years ===
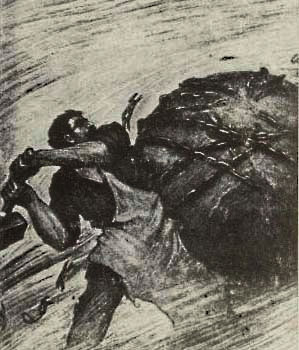
Detail of the first membership card of PCd'I in 1921

The roots of the PCI date back to 1921, when the I Congress of the Communist Party of Italy was held in Livorno on 21 January, following a split in the XVII Congress of the Italian Socialist Party. The split occurred after the Congress of Livorno refused to expel the reformist group as required by the Communist International (Comintern). The main factions of the new party were L'Ordine Nuovo, based in Turin and led by Antonio Gramsci, and the Maximalist faction led by Nicola Bombacci. Amadeo Bordiga was elected secretary of the new party.

The party was officially founded as the Communist Party of Italy – Section of the Communist International (Partito Comunista d'Italia – Sezione dell'Internazionale Comunista), since the Comintern was structured as a single world party according to Vladimir Lenin's vision. In the 1921 Italian general election, the party obtained 4.6% of the vote and 15 seats in the country's Chamber of Deputies. At the time, it was an active yet small faction within the Italian political left, which was strongly led by the PSI, while at the international level it was Soviet-led.

During its 2nd Congress in 1922, the new party registered 43,000 members. This was in part due to the entrance of almost the whole Socialist Youth Federation (Federazione Giovanile Socialista). The party adopted a slim structure headed by a Central Committee of 15 members, five of whom were also in the Executive Committee (EC), namely Ambrogio Belloni, Nicola Bombacci, Amadeo Bordiga (EC), Bruno Fortichiari (EC), Egidio Gennari, Antonio Gramsci, Ruggero Grieco (EC), Anselmo Marabini, Francesco Misiano, Giovanni Parodi, Luigi Polano, Luigi Repossi (EC), Cesare Sessa, Ludovico Tarsia, and Umberto Terracini (EC).

Since its formation, the party strived to organise itself on some bases that were not a mere reproduction of the traditional parties' bases. It then took again some arguments that distinguished the battle within the PSI, namely the idea that it is necessary to form an environment fiercely hostile to bourgeois society and that is an anticipation of the future socialist society. The purpose of this was not considered utopian because already in this society, especially in production, some structures are born on future results. In the first years of the PCd'I, there was no official leader; the accepted leader, first of the faction/tendency and then of the party, was Bordiga (Left) of the communist left current. Leaders of the minority currents were Angelo Tasca (Right) and Gramsci (Centre).

=== Conflict between factions ===
As a territorial section of Comintern, the PCd'I adopted the same program, the same conception of the party and the same tactics adopted by the II Congress in Moscow of 1920. The official program, drawn up in ten points, began with the intrinsically catastrophic nature of the capitalist system and terminated with the extinction of the state. It follows in a synthetic way the model outlined by Lenin for the Russian Communist Party (Bolsheviks). For a while, this identity resisted, but the fast progress of the reaction in Europe produced a change of tactics in a democratic direction within the Bolshevik party and consequently within the Comintern. This happened in particular regarding the possibility, previously opposed, of an alliance with the social democratic and bourgeois parties. This provoked a tension in the party between the majority (Left) and the minority factions (the Right and the Centre) supported by the Comintern. The proposals of the Left were no longer accepted and the conflict between the factions became irremediable.

=== Bolshevisation ===
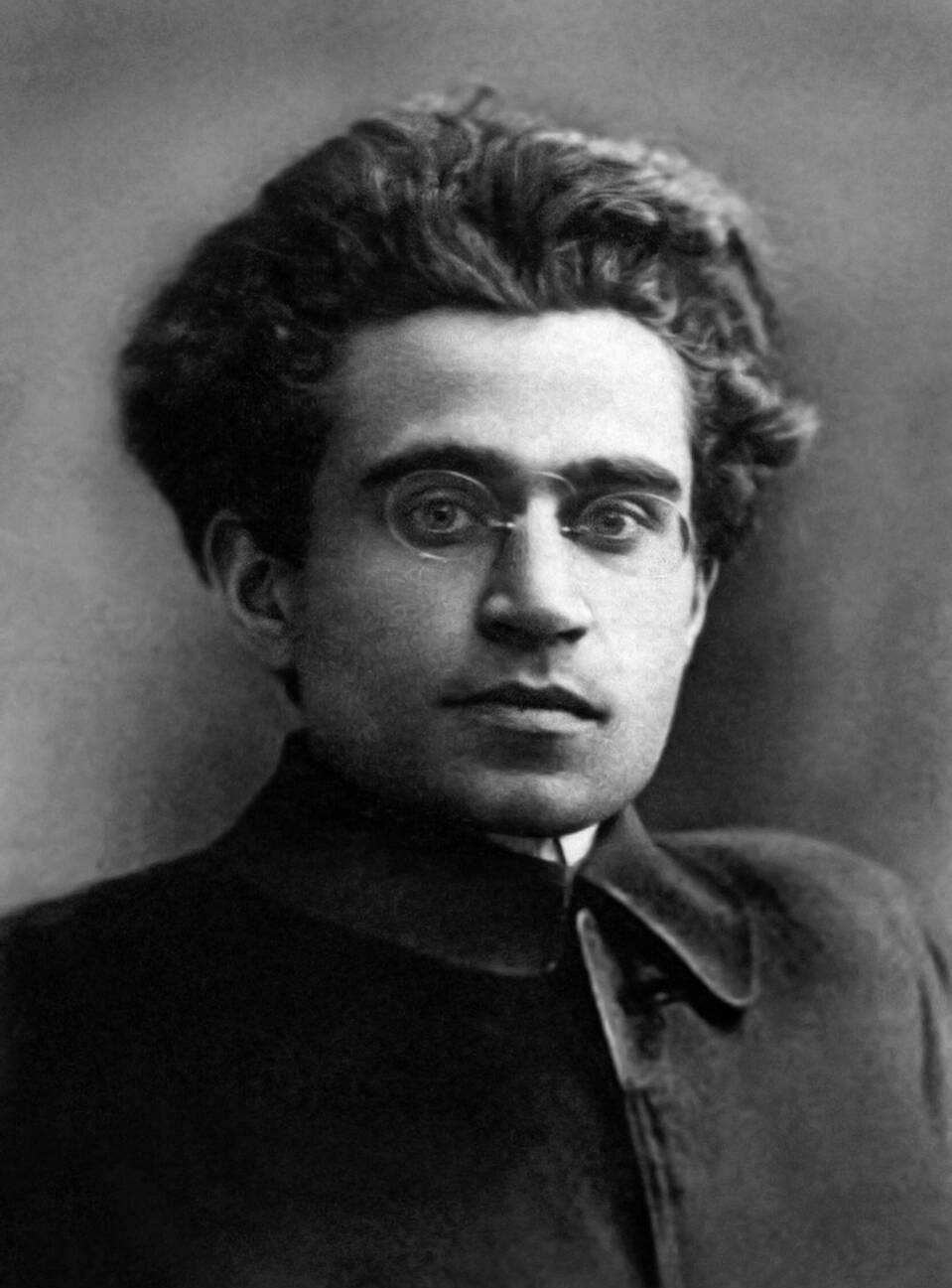
Antonio Gramsci

In 1923, some members of the party were arrested and put on trial for "conspiracy against the State". This allowed the intense activity of the Communist International to deprive the party's left-wing of authority and give control to the minority centre which had aligned with Moscow. In 1924–1925, the Comintern began a campaign of Bolshevisation, which forced each party to conform to the discipline and orders of Moscow. During the clandestine conference held in Como to ratify the party leadership in May 1924, 35 of the 45 federation secretaries, plus the secretary of the youth federation, voted for Bordiga's Left, four for Gramsci's Centre, and five for Tasca's Right.

Before the Lyon Congress in 1926, the Centre won almost all the votes in the absence of much of the Left, who were unable to attend as a result of fascist controls and lack of Comintern support. Recourse to the Comintern against this evident manoeuvre had little effect. The PCd'I as conceived by the Left terminated. The organisation continued with the support of the Comintern and a new structure and leadership. In 1922, the newspaper L'Ordine Nuovo was closed and in 1924 a new Centre newspaper, l'Unità, edited by Gramsci, was founded. The Left continued as a faction, principally functioning in exile. It published the newspaper Bilan, a monthly theoretical bulletin.

In 1926, Bordiga and Gramsci were arrested and imprisoned on the island of Ustica. In 1927, Palmiro Togliatti was elected secretary in place of Gramsci. In 1930, Bordiga was expelled from the Comintern and accused of Trotskyism. After Joseph Stalin dissolved the Communist International in 1943, the exiled members of the PCd'I in Moscow changed the party's name to the PCI on 15 May. Under this name, it reorganised in Italy and became a parliamentary party after the fall of Fascism.

=== Resistance to fascism ===
The party and its militants were actively involved in the resistance to Benito Mussolini's regime through clandestine action. They were well prepared for clandestine activity because of the structure of their organisation, and the fact that they had been victims of systematic repression by the authorities; more than three quarters of the political prisoners between 1926 and 1943 were communists. Throughout the dictatorship, the party was able to maintain and feed a clandestine network, distribute propaganda leaflets and newspapers, and infiltrate fascist unions and youth organisations. In 1935, the party led a campaign against the Second Italo-Ethiopian War. The party and communist partisans, among others, then went on to play a major role in the resistance movement that led to the fall of the Fascist regime in Italy.

The party's underground network played an organising role in the March 1943 strikes in Italy, the first mass strikes under the regime; the extent to which the movement was organised rather than spontaneous has been debated by historians.

On 15 May 1943, the party changed its official name to the Italian Communist Party (Partito Comunista Italiano), often shortened to PCI. This change was not surprising as PCI started being used as the party's acronym around 1924–1925. This name change also reflected a change in the Comintern's role—it increasingly became a federation of national communist parties. This trend accelerated after Lenin's death and its new name emphasised the party's shift from an international focus to an Italian one. At the time, it was a hotly contested issue for the two major factions of the party. On one side, the Leninists preferred the single world party as it was internationalist and strongly centralised, while on the other side the Italians wanted a party more tailored to their nation's peculiarities and more autonomy.

After the fall of Fascist Italy on 25 July 1943, the PCI returned to a formally legal status, playing a major role during the national liberation, known in Italy as Resistenza (Resistance) and forming many partisan groups. In April 1944, after the Svolta di Salerno (Salerno's turning point), Togliatti, who had returned to Italy the month prior after 18 years of exile, agreed to cooperate with King Victor Emmanuel III and his prime minister of Italy, the Marshal Pietro Badoglio. After the turn, the PCI took part in every government during the national liberation and constitutional period from June 1944 to May 1947. Their contribution to the new Italian democratic constitution was decisive. The Gullo decrees of 1944, named after Fausto Gullo, sought to improve social and economic conditions in the countryside. During Badoglio and Ferruccio Parri's cabinets, Togliatti served as the Deputy Prime Minister of Italy. During the Resistance, the PCI became increasingly popular, as the majority of partisans were communists. The Garibaldi Brigades, promoted by the PCI, were among the more numerous partisan forces.

The Garibaldi brigades trained and fought alongside future historical and leadership figures of the party: Giorgio Amendola, Pietro Ingrao, Luigi Longo, Giancarlo Paietta, Armando Cossutta, Aldo Tortorella and Alfredo Reiclin, as well as prominent figures in the CGIL trade union: Luciano Lama and Bruno Trentin. The brigade also included writers Italo Calvino and Gianni Rodari, film directors Carlo Lizzani, Gillo Pontecorvo and Luchino Visconti, educators Anna Maria Princigalli and Dina Rinaldi, and women journalists Rossana Rossanda and Miriam Mafai.

=== Post-war years ===
The PCI took part in the 1946 Italian general election and the 1946 Italian institutional referendum, campaigning for a republic. In the election, the PCI was third, behind Christian Democracy (DC) and the PSI, gaining almost 19% of votes and electing 104 members of the Constituent Assembly of Italy. The popular referendum resulted in the replacement of the monarchy with a republic, after 54% of the votes were in favour and 46% against. Luciano Canfora saw the Salerno Turn and 1944 as a rebirth of the PCI, and said "the PCI had gradually followed a path which required it, as a historical task, to occupy the space of social democracy in the Italian political panorama."

As part of the May 1947 crises, the PCI was excluded from government. Alcide De Gasperi, the DC leader and prime minister of Italy, was losing popularity, and feared that the leftist coalition would take power. While the PCI was growing particularly fast due to its organising efforts supporting sharecroppers in Sicily, Tuscany, and Umbria, movements that were also bolstered by the reforms of Fausto Gullo, the Italian Minister of Agriculture. On 1 May, the nation was thrown into crisis by the Portella della Ginestra massacre, in which eleven leftist peasants (including four children) were murdered at an International Workers' Day parade in Palermo by Salvatore Giuliano and his gang. In the political chaos that ensued, the United States government engineered the expulsion of all left-wing ministers from the cabinet on 31 May. The PCI would not have a national position in government again. De Gasperi did this under pressure from the United States Secretary of State, George Marshall, who had informed him that anti-communism was a pre-condition for receiving American aid, and Ambassador James Clement Dunn, who had directly asked de Gasperi to dissolve the parliament and remove the PCI.

In the 1948 Italian general election, the party joined the PSI in the Popular Democratic Front (FDP) but was defeated by the DC. The United States government provided support to anti-PCI groups in the election, and argued that should the PCI win, the Marshall Plan and other aids could be terminated. It spent $10–20 million on anti-communist propaganda and other covert operations, much of it through the Economic Cooperation Administration of the Marshall Plan, and then laundered through individual banks. Fearful of the possible FDP's electoral victory, the British and American governments also undermined their campaign for legal justice by tolerating the efforts made by Italy's top authorities to prevent any of the alleged Italian war criminals from being extradited and taken to court. The denial of Italian war crimes was backed up by the Italian state, academe, and media, re-inventing Italy as only a victim of Nazism and the post-war Foibe massacres.

The party gained considerable electoral success during the following years and occasionally supplied external support to the Organic centre-left governments, although it never directly joined a government. It successfully lobbied Fiat to set up the AvtoVAZ (Lada) car factory in the Soviet Union (1966). The party did best in Emilia-Romagna, Tuscany, and Umbria, where it regularly won the local administrative elections, and in some of the industrialised cities of Northern Italy. At the city government level during the course of the post-war period, the PCI demonstrated in cities like Bologna and Florence their capacity for uncorrupt, efficient and clean government. After the 1975 Italian local elections, the PCI was the strongest force in nearly all of the municipal councils of the great cities.

=== From the 1950s to the 1960s ===
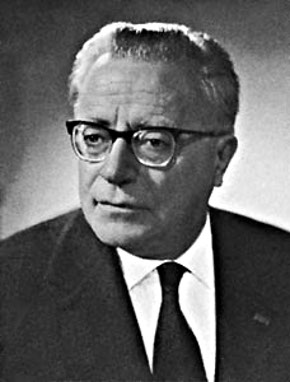
Palmiro Togliatti

The Soviet Union's brutal suppression of the Hungarian Revolution of 1956 created a split within the PCI. The party leadership, including Palmiro Togliatti and Giorgio Napolitano (who in 2006 became President of Italy), regarded the Hungarian insurgents as counter-revolutionaries as reported at the time in l'Unità, the official PCI newspaper. Giuseppe Di Vittorio, chief of the communist trade union Italian General Confederation of Labour (CGIL), repudiated the leadership position, as did prominent party member Antonio Giolitti and Italian Socialist Party national secretary Pietro Nenni, a close ally of the PCI. Napolitano later hinted at doubts over the propriety of his decision. He would eventually write in From the Communist Party to European Socialism. A Political Autobiography (Dal Pci al socialismo europeo. Un'autobiografia politica) that he regretted his justification of the Soviet intervention but quieted his concerns at the time for the sake of party unity and the international leadership of Soviet Communism. Giolitti and Nenni went on to split with the PCI over this issue. Napolitano became a leading member of the miglioristi faction within the PCI that promoted a social-democratic direction in party policy.

In the mid-1960s, the United States Department of State estimated the party membership to be approximately 1,350,000, or 4.2% of the working age population, making it the largest Communist party in per capita terms in the capitalist world at the time and the largest party at all in the whole of Western Europe with the Social Democratic Party of Germany. United States government sources said that the party was receiving $40–50 million per year from the Soviets when their investment in Italy was $5–6 million. Although the PCI relied on Soviet financial assistance more than any other Communist party supported by Moscow, declassified information shows this to be exaggerated.

According to the former KGB archivist Vasili Mitrokhin, Longo and other PCI leaders became alarmed at the possibility of a coup in Italy after the Athens Colonel coup in April 1967 that led to the Greek junta. These fears were not completely unfounded as there had been two attempted coups in Italy, Piano Solo in 1964 and Golpe Borghese in 1970, by military and neo-fascist groups. The PCI's Giorgio Amendola formally requested Soviet assistance to prepare the party in case of such an event. The KGB drew up and implemented a plan to provide the PCI with its own intelligence and clandestine signal corps. From 1967 through 1973, PCI members were sent to East Germany and Moscow to receive training in clandestine warfare and information gathering techniques by both the Stasi and the KGB. Shortly before the 1972 Italian general election, Longo personally wrote to Leonid Brezhnev asking for and receiving an additional $5.7 million in funding. This was on top of the $3.5 million that the Soviet Union gave the PCI in 1971. The Soviets also provided additional funding through the use of front organisations providing generous contracts to PCI members.

=== Leadership of Enrico Berlinguer ===
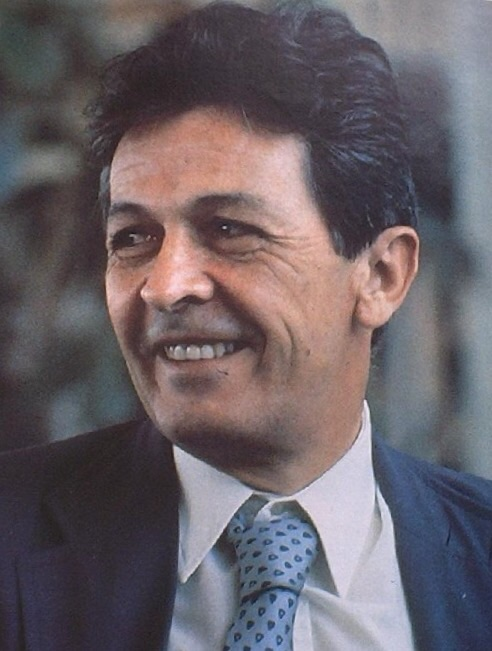
Enrico Berlinguer

In 1969, Enrico Berlinguer, the PCI deputy national secretary and later secretary general, took part in the international conference of the communist parties in Moscow, where his delegation disagreed with the official political line and refused to support the final report. Unexpectedly to his hosts, his speech challenged the communist leadership in Moscow. He refused to excommunicate the Chinese Communist Party and directly told Brezhnev that the Warsaw Pact invasion of Czechoslovakia, which he called "the tragedy in Prague", had made clear the considerable differences within the communist movement on fundamental questions, such as national sovereignty, socialist democracy, and the freedom of culture. At the time, the PCI, which had absorbed the PSI's left-wing, the Italian Socialist Party of Proletarian Unity, so strengthening its leadership over the Italian left, was the largest communist party in a capitalist state, garnering 34.4% of the vote in the 1976 Italian general election.

Relationships between the PCI and the Soviet Union gradually fell apart as the party moved away from Soviet obedience and Marxist–Leninist orthodoxy in the 1970s and 1980s and toward Eurocommunism. The PCI sought a collaboration with the socialist and Christian democracy parties, a policy known as the Historic Compromise. The kidnapping and murder of Aldo Moro, the DC leader, by the Red Brigades in May 1978 put an end to any hopes of such a compromise. The compromise was largely abandoned as a PCI policy in 1981. The Proletarian Unity Party merged into the PCI in 1984.

During the Years of Lead, the PCI strongly opposed the terrorism and the Red Brigades, who in turn murdered or wounded many PCI members or trade unionists close to the PCI. According to Mitrokhin, the party asked the Soviets to pressure the StB, Czechoslovakia's State Security, to withdraw their support to the group, which Moscow was unable or unwilling to do. This, along with the Soviet invasion of Afghanistan, led to a complete break with Moscow in 1979. In 1980, the PCI refused to participate in the international conference of Communist parties in Paris; cash payments to the PCI continued until 1984.

=== Dissolution ===
Achille Occhetto became general secretary of the PCI in 1988. At a 1989 conference in a working-class section of Bologna, Occhetto stunned the party faithful with a speech heralding the Revolutions of 1989, a move now referred to in Italian politics as the svolta della Bolognina (Bolognina turning point). The collapse of the Communist governments in the Eastern Europe led Occhetto to conclude that the era of Eurocommunism was over. Under his leadership, the PCI dissolved and refounded itself as the Democratic Party of the Left, which branded itself as a progressive left-wing and democratic-socialist party. A third of the PCI membership, led by Armando Cossutta, refused to join the PDS, and instead seceded to form the Communist Refoundation Party. The Democratic Party of the Left includes both those who were in favor of dissolving the Communist Party and those Ingraiani who, despite being opposed to it, preferred to remain in the party. The latter would go on to form the internal left wing of the Democratic Party of the Left: Fausto Bertinotti and Luciana Castellina (who would later join Rifondazione Comunista), Aldo Tortorella, Gavino Angius, Fulvia Bandoli, Gloria Buffo, Vincenzo Vita and Giacomo Princigalli.

== Ideology and policies ==
At its origin, the PCd'I was born as a alternative to the "pseudo-revolutionary tradition" of the PSI, that, even under Nicola Bombacci and Giacinto Menotti Serrati's pro-election maximalist leadership (in contrast to Bordiga’s “abstentionist communist” wing, but still revolutionary), which awaited the revolution rather than preparing for it, did not exploit the Biennio Rosso appropriately, in order to achieve socialism.

When he was arrested, Gramsci's leadership was replaced by that of Togliatti, that, despite an initial closeness to Bordiga's left-communism and later (1926-1929) to Bukharin, was closer to Stalinist positions (accepting the doctrine of "social fascism" and the adoption of the Soviet model as a universal standard for all communist parties), shifting the party's positions toward loyalty to the USSR and subsequently adopting Marxism-Leninism, whose study and in-depth understanding were considered a duty for party members under every statute after 1921 (1946, 1949, 1951, 1957, 1962, 1966, 1969, 1972, 1975), disappearing only with that of 1979, following a decision by Berlinguer, who rejected it.

In the late 70s/early 80s, with the leadership of Berlinguer, the party took an Eurocommunist position, rooted in Gramsci's cultural hegemony and war of position, and democratic road to socialism, in particular Togliatti's post-WW2 Italian road to socialism, in turn highly influenced by Gramsci's thought, who supported strategic and decision-making autonomy of each communist party within its own national context.

=== Domestic Policies ===
==== Economy ====
In 1984, the PCI, together with the communist majority of the CGIL, opposed the reduction of the automatic adjustment of wages to inflation (Scala Mobile), proposed by the Craxi government (and subsequently approved with the "San Valentine Decree") due to the inflation crisis caused by the 1973 and 1979 oil crises, and proposed an abrogative referendum for these measures.

==== Social issues ====
The PCI and the DC (represented by Togliatti and De Gasperi) were the primary advocates for women's suffrage in the elections following the Second World War, a proposal also supported by the PSI. Like the Action Party, the Italian Republican Party, and the Italian Liberal Party, also within PCI, DC and PSI there was some opposition to women's vote: in particular, the Communists feared that the Catholic Church’s strong influence over women in Southern Italy and in rural areas would have benefited the DC.

Initially, the PCI viewed divorce as a secondary issue compared to economic rights; however, in 1968, along with the PSU, PRI, and PSIUP, it introduced a bill to legalize divorce (a matter first raised in 1965 by the Socialist deputy Fortuna). The law was passed in 1970, and the PCI subsequently aligned itself with the "No" camp in the referendum that wanted to repeal it.

The party supported the legalization of abortion since 1976, and over the following two years contributed to the parliamentary debate that led to the passing of the "Legge 194", which allowed and regulated it, and he sided with the "no" front on the referendum that wanted to eliminate abortion.

It also supported the elimination of life-imprisonment.

On gay rights, the PCI initially had a repressive attitude towards its homosexual members, but the situation improved significantly in the late 70s/early 80s, with the gay movement coming closer to communist and socialist parties. In 1984 several homosexual activists (some of whom were already members of the PDUP) announced that they were joining the party, defining sexual liberation as a key component of the PCI’s alternative and of the construction of a socialist society. This move was supported by the Circle of Homosexual Culture Mario Mieli, as well as by Carlo Leoni and Giulia Rodano, provincial secretaries of the PCI’s Rome federation. Leoni, specifically, confirmed that the relationship between the PCI and the homosexual movement had become positive. In the following years, some openly gay PCI candidates, such as Nichi Vendola and Franco Grillini, would also run in elections.

=== Foreign Policy ===
==== European Economic Community ====
Initially, the PCI held an Eurosceptic position, opposing the creation of the European Common Market and Euratom, and there was skepticism regarding the concept of "Europe" that was being proposed, a federation linked to the US that would have excluded the East, with a preference instead for a demilitarized pan-European project; in 1957, the criticisms became more moderate, while still remaining in economic, military, and anti-colonial terms. Subsequently, during its Eurocommunist period, the PCI supported the strengthening of the European Parliament's powers (unlike the PCF), as well as the construction of a socialist Europe, and the party’s pro-European vision also led to the candidacy of individuals such as the European federalist Altiero Spinelli.

==== USSR and Pact of Warsaw Pact ====
From 1947, the USSR provided substantial funding to the PCI, amounting to approximately 889 billion lire (in year 2000 value), out of a total of 989 billion lire in funding provided to Italy; this, in turn, represented about 25% of the USSR’s total global funding (3,900 billion lire) for leftist parties and workers' organizations. Funding arrived both through the "red cooperatives", linked to the PCI, and Soviet ambassadors in Rome; in the 1971–1976 period alone, the USSR gave the party the equivalent of 23.3 million dollars (32-33 million dollars between 1973-1979, through the International Trade Union Fund for the Support of Left-Wing Workers' Organizations, financed mainly by the CPSU). Even though the decision to stop funding from Moscow took place at the end of 1975 (thanks to Berlinguer, Cervetti and Chiaromonte), official payments took place until 1979 (in particular, in this year, the PCI obtained in two separate occasions 711.15 and 829.95 million lire), and continued to flow to pro-Soviet factions until the end of the USSR, despite the party having become economically independent from the 1980s onwards, thanks in part to the 1974 law on the public financing of political parties.

Under the leadership of Togliatti, the party was loyal to the USSR, first accepting social fascism and then the strategy of the popular fronts, and also supporting the repression of the Hungarian Revolution.

After having assumed a more independent position from Moscow, the party condemned the repression of the Prague Spring (which it supported, as well as Czechoslovakia's leader, Alexander Dubček) and as the Soviet invasion of Afghanistan, even though a part of the party did not agree with this last position.

==== Spain ====
Under the order of the USSR, PCd'I delegates went to fought in Spanish Civil War alogside the Republican Faction, such as Luigi Longo and Togliatti. In particular, the latter had an enormous influence on the PCE, becoming the "virtual head of the party" when he replaced Codovila, and, while considering the uncertainty and contradictions about the dates, it is likely that he was present in the country as early as 1936, and took part in the repression of the anarchists and the POUM.

== Factions ==
Although the party was opposed to autonomous factions within itself, both in the 1920s and on its return to parliament after the Second World War, depending on the period it has had various factions and currents, including social democrats, Bukharinists, Marxist-Leninists, Eurocommunists, Trotskyists, workerists and left-communists, as well as others linked to specific groups, such as Azione Comunista; it was also divided into its right (Angelo Tasca, Amendola, Giorgio Napolitano), center (Antonio Gramsci, Luigi Longo, Enrico Berlinguer, and subsequently Ingrao), and left (Bordiga, Damen, NOI, GCR, Azione Comunista, initially Ingrao, Armando Cossuta) wings. The party even had anarchists, such as Gino Paoli, elected from its lists.

=== Trotskyists (Nuova Opposizione Italiana and Gruppi Comunisti Rivoluzionari) ===
Members of the PCI who later gravitated toward Trotskyism were present from the party’s founding, such as Alfonso Leonetti, Paolo Ravazzoli, Pietro Tresso, Mario Bavassano and Gaetana Teresa Recchia, who, in 1930, established the "New Italian Opposition" (NOI) as an internal opposition faction within the PCd'I. They did not believe that the social context in Italy was pre-revolutionary, did not share the view that social democracy and other anti-fascist groups had become weak (though they were not clear about the "social-fascist" nature of social democracy, as it was characterized by the Comintern), and did not consider a "democratic prelude" to a socialist revolution to be the most likely scenario in Italy, insisting "on the need to employ democratic slogans of a transitional nature." That same year, all five of them faced disciplinary sanctions and/or were subsequently expelled from the party, with the NOI becoming an independent organization, part of the International Left Opposition.

On 1 and 2 January 1949, some Italian Trotskyists, including both long-standing members and younger people from the PCI, the Socialist Youth Federation, and the Action Party, came together to form the Revolutionary Communist Groups. In 1952, many members of the GCR adopted the practice of entryism, joining the PCI while remaining in the GCR at the same time. These members tended to see primarily the negative effects of the mass party, in particular the large number of registered members with low levels of political participation and preparation, and they viewed it as corresponding "to the needs of the bureaucratic leaderships, which wanted to transform communist parties not into revolutionary vanguard organizations […] but rather into gigantic electoral machines, whose individual members would engage in limited, day-to-day propaganda within their own respective spheres on the eve of elections, all while lacking that continuous, mutual contact which fosters the exchange of opinions and experiences, develops a critical sense, and heightens the desire to participate in shaping the party’s political line". According to them, this reduced party cells and sections to merely carrying out directives from above, and limited internal democracy.

When Khrushchev delivered his secret speech and began de-Stalinization, the GCR argued that "a ruling class cannot make mistakes for twenty years", criticizing the partial self-acquittal, in particular due to the admission of guilt regarding "the elimination of a whole series of communist militants and leaders, the abandonment of Leninism, and the violation of internal party democracy". The GCR also supported the Hungarian revolutionaries in 1956. Also during the mid-1950s, the entrists had managed to integrate themselves effectively into the party. The 20th Congress of the CPSU brought an end to the political isolation of the GCR, leading to a relative increase in their influence as they took on a role of "bearing witness": "The disoriented communist militant […] who, especially if young, barely knew of the existence of a Trotskyist 'sect,' would realize, upon reading the newspaper […], that this 'sect' was not really a 'sect' at all, given that it could grasp the fundamental problems faced by comrades in crisis and speak their language", up until the point when a dialogue with them was acknowledged, which occurred during the conference on Gramsci studies in January 1958, to which Livio Maitan was invited, and his contribution regarding the relationship between Gramsci and Trotsky was accepted, with the explicit support of Togliatti.

The Trotskyists criticized Amendola’s idea of a single party that would bring together communists, socialists, and liberal socialists, but they agreed on the possibility of organizing into internal tendencies within the party. At the 11th party congress (1966), criticisms and demands regarding internal democracy were also supported by Pietro Ingrao, of the PCI’s left wing, with whom the GCR tried to collaborate, but then a distancing occurred, following the passive stance taken by members close to Ingrao after the defeat of the left-wing faction at the congress, despite the reprisals from the party’s right wing, involving reassignments and expulsions. In 1968, following the failure of the attempt to move closer to Ingrao, and with the emergence of new social forces on the left, outside of the traditional parties, the GCR decided, at its 12th Congress, to bring an end to its entryist experience within the PCI.

=== Azione Comunista ===
Azione Comunista ("Communist Action"), an informal name for the Movement for the Communist Left (MSC) derived from the group's newspaper, was a left-wing faction within the PCI between 1954 and 1956, which subsequently broke away due to both voluntary departures by dissidents and expulsions, in particular after the publication of the newspaper’s first article, the expression of solidarity with the Hungarian revolutionaries (a move that also alienated a Stalinist base that had previously sympathized with the group), and the eighth party congress.

The movement took shape following a meeting in October 1953, which was attended by the Anarchist Groups for Proletarian Action (GAAP) (which for some years had adopted a "frontist" stance regarding anarchist-revolutionary organizations), Onorato Damen and other militants of the Internationalist Communist Party, and some Trotskyists of the Gruppi Comunisti Rivoluzionari (Revolutionary Communist Groups); subsequently, in 1954, the group was also joined by dissidents from the PCI who held workerist and revolutionary views and were associated with Giulio Seniga. However, between 1956 and 1957, Trotskyists, Damenists and communists loyal to Pietro Secchia did not finally join Azione Comunista, which formed the MSC together with the Federazione Comunista Libertaria (formerly the GAAP).

== Popular support ==
In all its history, the PCI was particularly strong in Central Italy, in the Red Regions of Emilia-Romagna, Marche, Tuscany, and Umbria, as well as in the industrialised cities of Northern Italy. The party's municipal showcase was Bologna, which was held continuously by the PCI from 1945 onwards. Amongst other measures, the local PCI administration tackled urban problems with successful programmes of health for the elderly, nursery education and traffic reform, while also undertaking initiatives in housing and school meal provisions.

Communist administrations at a local level helped to aid new businesses while also introducing innovative social reforms. From 1946 to 1956, the Communist city council built 31 nursery schools, 896 flats, and 9 schools. Health care improved substantially, street lighting was installed, new drains and municipal launderettes were built and 8,000 children received subsidised school meals. In 1972, the then-mayor of Bologna, Renato Zangheri, introduced a new and innovative traffic plan with strict limitations for private vehicles and a renewed concentration on cheap public transport. Bologna's social services continued to expand throughout the early and mid-1970s. The city centre was restored, centres for the mentally sick were instituted to help those who had been released from recently closed psychiatric hospitals, handicapped persons were offered training and found suitable jobs, afternoon activities for schoolchildren were made less mindless than the traditional doposcuola (after-school activities), and school programming for the whole day helped working parents.

View source data.

The electoral results of the PCI in the general (Chamber of Deputies) elections since 1946 are shown in the chart above.

== Election results ==
=== Italian Parliament ===
Election	Leader	Chamber of Deputies					Senate of the Republic				
Election	Leader	Votes	%	Seats	+/–	Position	Votes	%	Seats	+/–	Position
1921	Amadeo Bordiga	304,719	4.6	15 / 535	▲15	▲7th	No election				
1924	Antonio Gramsci	268,191	3.6	19 / 535	▲4	▲6th	No election				
1929	Antonio Gramsci	Banned		0 / 400	▼19	–	No election				
1934	Palmiro Togliatti	Banned		0 / 400	0	–	No election				
1946	Palmiro Togliatti	4,356,686	18.9	104 / 556	▲104	▲3rd	No election				
1948	Palmiro Togliatti	8,136,637 (Note: Into the Popular Democratic Front)	31.0	130 / 574	▲26	▲2nd	6,969,122	30.8	50 / 237	▲19	▲2nd
1953	Palmiro Togliatti	6,120,809	22.6	143 / 590	▲13	2nd	6,120,809	22.6	56 / 237	▲6	2nd
1958	Palmiro Togliatti	6,704,454	22.7	140 / 596	▼3	2nd	6,704,454	22.2	60 / 246	▲4	2nd
1963	Palmiro Togliatti	7,767,601	25.3	166 / 630	▲26	2nd	6,933,842	25.2	84 / 315	▲24	2nd
1968	Luigi Longo	8,557,404	26.9	177 / 630	▲11	2nd	8,583,285	30.0	101 / 315	▲17	2nd
1972	Enrico Berlinguer	9,072,454	27.1	179 / 630	▲2	2nd	8,475,141	28.1	94 / 315	▼7	2nd
1976	Enrico Berlinguer	12,622,728	34.4	228 / 630	▲49	2nd	10,640,471	33.8	116 / 315	▲22	2nd
1979	Enrico Berlinguer	11,139,231	30.4	201 / 630	▼27	2nd	9,859,004	31.5	109 / 315	▼7	2nd
1983	Enrico Berlinguer	11,032,318	29.9	198 / 630	▼3	2nd	9,579,699	30.8	107 / 315	▼2	2nd
1987	Alessandro Natta	10,254,591	26.6	177 / 630	▼24	2nd	9,181,579	28.3	101 / 315	▼6	2nd

=== European Parliament ===
Election	Leader	Votes	%	Seats	+/–	Position	EP Group
1979	Enrico Berlinguer	10,361,344	29.6	24 / 81	▲24	▲2nd	COM
1984	Alessandro Natta	11,714,428	33.3	27 / 81	▲3	▲1st	COM
1989	Achille Occhetto	9,598,369	27.6	22 / 81	▼5	▼2nd	COM

=== Regional elections ===
Regions of Italy
Election year	Votes	%	Seats	+/−	Leader
1970	7,586,983 (2nd)	27.9	200 / 720	–	Luigi Longo
1975	10,148,723 (2nd)	33.4	247 / 720	▲47	Enrico Berlinguer
1980	9,555,767 (2nd)	31.5	233 / 720	▼14	Enrico Berlinguer
1985	9,686,140 (2nd)	30.2	225 / 720	▼8	Alessandro Natta
1990	7,660,553 (2nd)	24.0	182 / 720	▼43	Achille Occhetto

== Leadership ==
- Secretary: Antonio Gramsci (1926), Camilla Ravera (1927–1930), Palmiro Togliatti (1930–1934), Ruggero Grieco (1934–1938), Palmiro Togliatti (1938–1964), Luigi Longo (1964–1972), Enrico Berlinguer (1972–1984), Alessandro Natta (1984–1988), Achille Occhetto (1988–1991)
- President: Luigi Longo (1972–1980), Alessandro Natta (1989–1990), Aldo Tortorella (1990–1991)
- Leader in the Chamber of Deputies: Luigi Longo (1946–1947), Palmiro Togliatti (1947–1964), Pietro Ingrao (1964–1972), Alessandro Natta (1972–1979), Fernando Di Giulio (1979–1981), Giorgio Napolitano (1981–1986), Renato Zangheri (1986–1990), Giulio Quercini (1990–1991)
- Leader in the Senate: Mauro Scoccimarro (1948–1958), Umberto Terracini (1958–1973), Edoardo Perna (1973–1986), Gerardo Chiaromonte (1983–1986), Ugo Pecchioli (1986–1991)
- Leader in the European Parliament: Giorgio Amendola (1979–1980), Guido Fanti (1980–1984), Giovanni Cervetti (1984–1989), Luigi Alberto Colajanni (1989–1991)

== Symbols ==
1921–1945

1945–1951

1951–1991
