= Giuseppe Berti =

Italian politician and journalist (1901–1979)

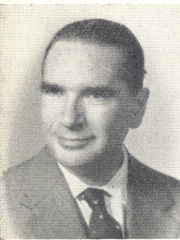

Member of the Chamber of Deputies
- In office 8 May 1948 – 11 June 1958

Senator of the Republic
- In office 12 June 1958 – 15 May 1963

Personal details
- Born: 21 July 1901 Naples, Kingdom of Italy
- Died: 16 March 1979 (aged 77) Rome, Italy
- Party: PCI
- Occupation: Historian, journalist

Giuseppe Berti (22 July 1901 – 16 March 1979) was an Italian communist politician, journalist and historian.

== Biography ==
Berti was born in to a middle-class Waldenisan family active in the socialist movement. He began his political activism at the age of 17 in Palermo, where he studied law. As a young socialist he founded the revolutionary magazine Clartè and also wrote in the newspaper Il Soviet.

In January 1921 he was among the delegates at the socialist congress in Livorno who founded the Communist Party of Italy. A month later, Berti became the secretary of the Italian Communist Youth Federation as well as director of the related weekly L'Avanguardia. During this period he was close to the faction of Angelo Tasca.

He was arrested in May 1923 in Milan with the entire leadership of the Fgcd'I, but was soon acquitted. In 1926, he was appointed editor of l'Unita. In 1927 he was arrested again and this time sentenced to three years of confinement which he served in Ustica, Ponza and Pantelleria. In 1922 he had met Maria Baroncini, whom he married in May 1927: in March of the same year their daughter Vinca was born.

Having returned relatively free in 1930, Berti joined what remained of his party in Moscow, where he had already been a delegate to the Fifth Congress of the Comintern and as a member of the secretariat of the Communist Youth International.

Between 1930 and 1931 he represented the Pcd'I at the Comintern, then divided his time between Moscow and Paris, where he directed the émigré newspaper. He also worked as a teacher in the schools where the new communist leaders were being trained. Sent from Moscow to Paris, he replaced Ruggero Grieco as secretary of the PCd'I in April 1938.

After the end of his relationship with Maria Baroncini, he married Baldina Di Vittorio, Giuseppe Di Vittorio's daughter, with whom he had his daughter Silvia. He worked in Lo Stato operaio and at the end of the 1930s he was in fact the head of the foreign center of the Pcd'I. With the Nazi invasion of France in 1940, he fled to the United States where he remained for the entire war period organizing the Italian anti-fascist forces in America. He returned to Italy after the Liberation.

Between 1948 and 1963 he was elected as a member of parliament in Sicily. Berti's passion for historical and philosophical studies led him to gradually abandon political activities in favour of academic works.

He was the first national secretary of the Associazione Italia Urss and the director of the magazine Società. He edited the critical edition of the papers of the Tasca archive for the Annali Feltrinelli.

Berti died of a stroke on March 16, 1979.

== Works ==
- Contro la guerra imperialista innalziamo la bandiera della guerra civile, Fgcd'I, 1932
- Giù le mani dalla Cina, Edizioni del Pcd'I, 1932
- A new Italy arises, New York, Workers Library, 1943
- L'antisovietismo contro l'Italia, Roma, U.E.S.I.S.A., s. d.
- La via della pace. Discorso di apertura al I Congresso nazionale Italia-URSS. Torino, Teatro Alfieri, 25 ottobre 1949, Roma, U.E.S.I.S.A., 1949
- Il pensiero democratico russo del XIX secolo, Firenze, Sansoni, 1950
- Per uno studio della vita e del pensiero di Antonio Labriola, Roma, 1954
- I democratici e l'iniziativa meridionale nel Risorgimento, Feltrinelli, Milano, 1962
- I primi dieci anni di vita del P.C.I. Documenti inediti dell'archivio Angelo Tasca, Milano, Feltrinelli, 1967
