= Luigi Longo =

Former leader of the Italian Communist Party (1900–1980)

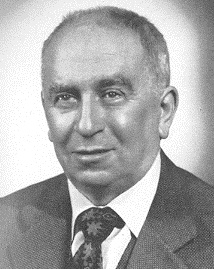

General Secretary of the Italian Communist Party
- In office 22 August 1964 – 16 March 1972
- Preceded by: Palmiro Togliatti
- Succeeded by: Enrico Berlinguer

Member of the Chamber of Deputies
- In office 8 May 1948 – 16 October 1980
- Constituency: Milan

Member of the Constituent Assembly
- In office 25 June 1946 – 31 January 1948
- Constituency: Milan

Personal details
- Born: 15 March 1900 Fubine, Kingdom of Italy
- Died: 16 October 1980 (aged 80) Rome, Italy
- Party: PCI (1921–1980); PSI (before 1921)
- Spouse: Teresa Noce (m. 1926; died 1980)

Luigi Longo (15 March 1900 – 16 October 1980), also known as Gallo, was an Italian communist politician and general secretary of the Italian Communist Party from 1964 to 1972.

== Early life ==
Longo was born in Fubine, in the province of Alessandria, Piedmont. As a student at the Politecnico di Torino, he became active in the youth wing of the Italian Socialist Party (PSI), and engaged in political propaganda from a Marxist perspective. He was a regular visitor to the offices of L'Ordine Nuovo, the newspaper founded by Antonio Gramsci, and became acquainted with Gramsci and Palmiro Togliatti. In 1921, at the Livorno Congress of the PSI, he was one of the instigators of the split in the party, when supporters of Vladimir Lenin's Bolshevik line left to form the Italian Communist Party (PCI). He became a leading figure in the new PCI along with Togliatti, Gramsci and others.

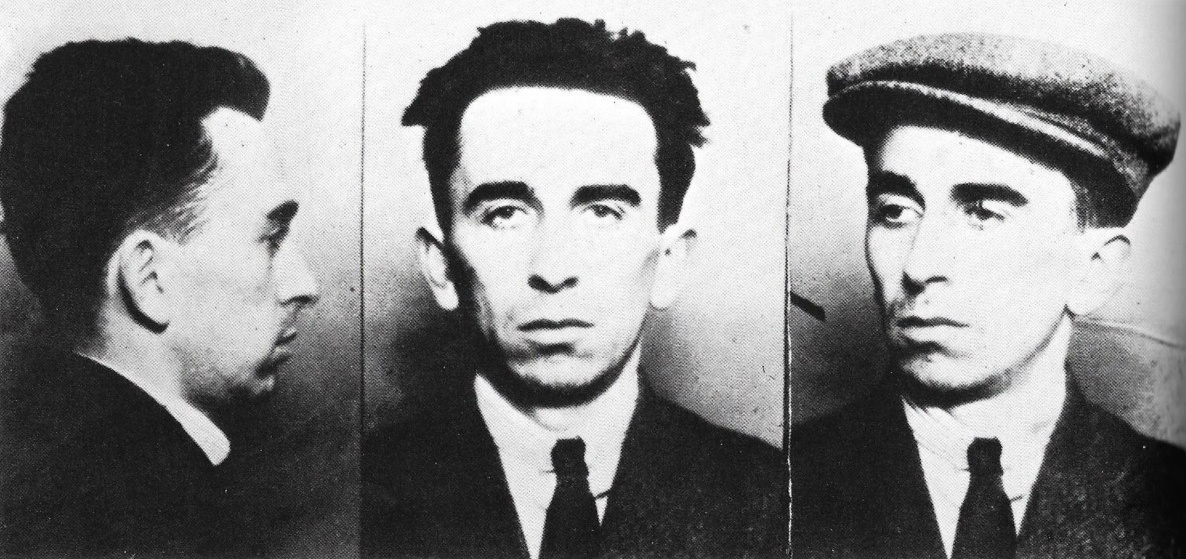
Photo of Longo after his arrest in 1930

Longo was a fervent anti-fascist, and, when Benito Mussolini established his Fascist regime in Italy in 1922, he emigrated to France where he became one of the principal leaders of the PCI. In the same year, he was a member of a delegation to the Comintern Congress in Moscow, where he met Lenin. He would return to Moscow several times in the years to come, with a specific expertise in political ideology, and was to meet Joseph Stalin and other members of the Soviet Union leadership. In 1933, he became a member of the Comintern's political commission. In 1934, he signed a joint action agreement between the PCI and the PSI.

== Spanish Civil War and Resistance ==
Longo took part in the Spanish Civil War as an inspector of the Republican troops in the International Brigades under the leadership of Randolfo Pacciardi, and took the nom de guerre Gallo. After the defeat of the Second Spanish Republic by General Franco, he returned to France.

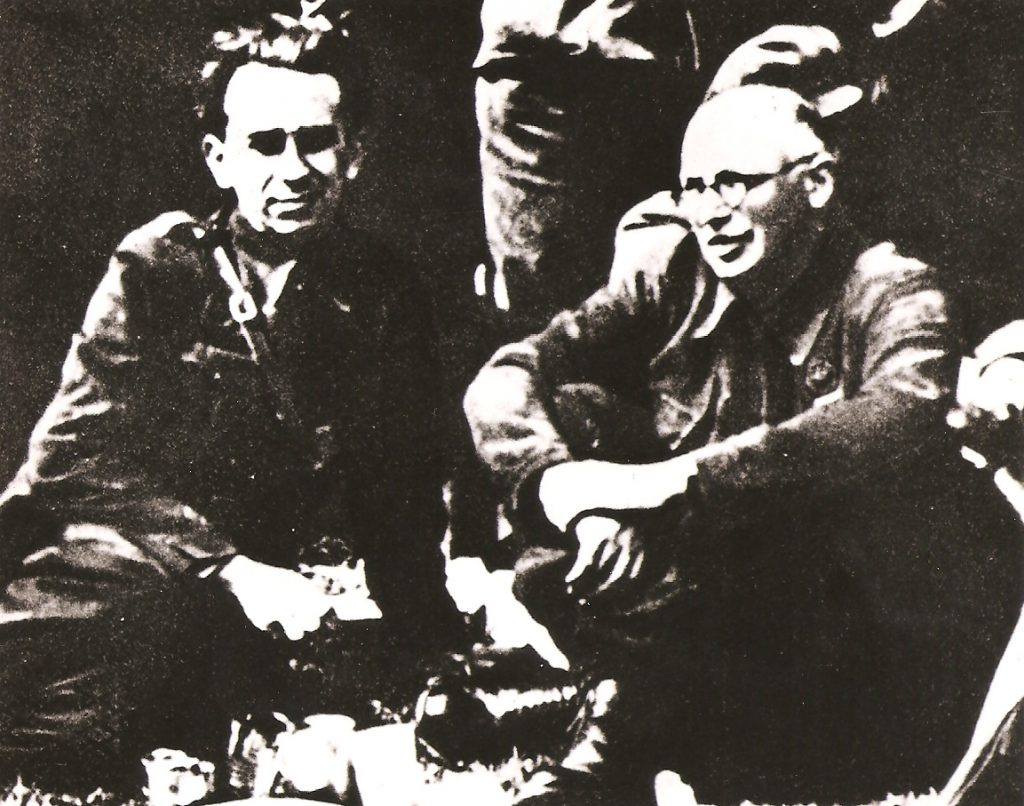
Longo and Pietro Nenni during the Spanish Civil War

Following the 1940 invasion of France, the Vichy-based collaborationist government was established under Philippe Pétain. Longo was arrested and detained in an internment camp at Vernet from 1939 to 1941. There he made the acquaintance of Leo Valiani, among other left-wing radicals. In 1941 he was handed over to the Italian fascist authorities and interned at Ventotene. When Mussolini fell from power on 25 July 1943, Longo was released. After Mussolini regained control of Northern Italy (which he led as the Italian Social Republic), Longo took command of the Garibaldi Brigades, the communist forces in the Italian partisan resistance. Longo became deputy commander of the Gruppo volontari per la liberta ("Group of Volunteers for Freedom"), and a close collaborator of Ferruccio Parri; in April 1945, Longo was one of the leading figures of the uprising in northern Italy. It was at Dongo on Lake Como on 28 April 1945, and whilst being escorted by the Garibaldi Brigade partisans, that Mussolini and his mistress Claretta Petacci were executed; the extent to which Longo took part in the killings has been the subject of dispute by historians.

== Post-war ==
After the war, he was a member of the National Congress and in 1946 was elected to the Constituent Assembly. Also in 1946, Teresa Mattei chose the mimosa as the symbol of International Women's Day at the request of Longo. He was subsequently elected, and repeatedly re-elected, to the Italian Chamber of Deputies on the PCI list and was a member of the party leadership. In 1964, after the death of Palmiro Togliatti, he became secretary of the PCI, declaring that he was "a secretary, not a boss". In this role, he continued Togliatti's line, known as the "Italian road to Socialism", playing down the alliance between the Italian Communist Party and the Soviet Union. He reacted without hostility to the new left movements that sprang up in 1968 and, among the leaders of the PCI, was one of those most disposed to engage with the new activists, although he did not condone their excesses.

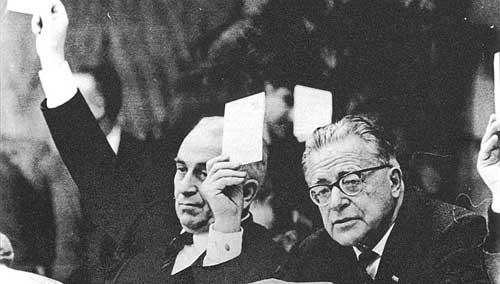
Longo and Togliatti during the VIII Congress of the PCI, 1956

In late 1968, Longo suffered a stroke; although he partially recovered in the subsequent months, from February 1969 he was assisted in most decisions by Enrico Berlinguer acting as vice-secretary. In 1972, Longo resigned from the position of party secretary, supporting the choice of Berlinguer as his successor. From that year until his death, eight years later in Rome, he was honorary president of the PCI. In that capacity, he expressed his opposition to the "national solidarity" line the PCI was later to espouse.

Longo was also a prolific writer. He was the founder of Vie Nuove, a popular magazine of the Communist Party.

== Electoral history ==
Election	House	Constituency	Party	Votes	Result
1946	Constituent Assembly	Milan–Pavia	PCI	46,298	Elected
1948	Chamber of Deputies	Milan–Pavia	FDP	76,725	Elected
1953	Chamber of Deputies	Milan–Pavia	PCI	58,384	Elected
1958	Chamber of Deputies	Milan–Pavia	PCI	40,480	Elected
1963	Chamber of Deputies	Milan–Pavia	PCI	65,779	Elected
1968	Chamber of Deputies	Milan–Pavia	PCI	80,080	Elected
1972	Chamber of Deputies	Milan–Pavia	PCI	75,429	Elected
1976	Chamber of Deputies	Milan–Pavia	PCI	110,569	Elected
1979	Chamber of Deputies	Milan–Pavia	PCI	83,913	Elected

== Sources ==
- Aldo Agosti, ed. (1992). Luigi Longo: la politica e l'azione. Rome: Editori Riuniti. ISBN 88-359-3603-9.
- Aldo Agosti (1999). Storia del Partito comunista italiano: 1921-1991. Rome - Bari: Laterza. ISBN 88-420-5965-X.

Party political offices
Preceded by Palmiro Togliatti	Secretary of the Italian Communist Party; 1964–1972	Succeeded by Enrico Berlinguer
