= List of secretaries of the Italian Communist Party =

This is a list of national secretaries of the Italian Communist Party (PCI). Until 1926 though the office of secretary did not exist. Amadeo Bordiga and Antonio Gramsci were members of the executive committee and Central Committee in the Communist Party of Italy (PCd'I).

No.	Portrait	Name (Birth–Death)	Term of office		Ref.
1		Amadeo Bordiga (1889–1970)	21 January 1921	March 1923	
2		Antonio Gramsci (1891–1937)	14 August 1924	8 November 1926 (Note: Gramsci's leadership ended with his arrest in Rome on 8 November 1926 by Fascist authorities.)	
–		Palmiro Togliatti (1893–1964)	November 1926	January 1934	
3		Ruggero Grieco (1893–1955)	January 1934	May 1938	
4		Palmiro Togliatti (1893–1964)	May 1938	August 1964	
5		Luigi Longo (1900–1980)	22 August 1964	16 March 1972	
6		Enrico Berlinguer (1922–1984)	17 March 1972	11 June 1984	
7		Alessandro Natta (1918–2001)	26 June 1984	10 June 1988	
8		Achille Occhetto (1936–)	21 June 1988	3 February 1991 (Note: The PCI ceased to exist on 3 February 1991, when its 20th Congress in Rimini voted to transform it into the Democratic Party of the Left (PDS).)	
