= Baldina Di Vittorio =

Italian politician (1920–2015)

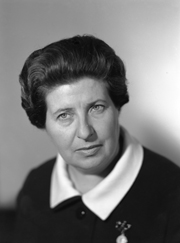
Official portrait for the Italian Senate, 1968

Balda "Baldina" Di Vittorio (16 October 1920 – 2 January 2015) was an Italian politician.

== Biography ==
Balda Di Vittorio was born in Cerignola, Apulia. The daughter of the syndicalist trade unionist Giuseppe, Di Vittorio was registered in the Communist Party since 1938, at a time when the party had been outlawed by the Fascist regime. At the outbreak of the Second World War she was interned in the Rieucros Camp in the Lozère department, and after the collapse of France she took refuge in the United States with her husband Giuseppe Berti. In New York Di Vittorio enrolled the courses of Jefferson School of Social Science and joined several anti-fascist groups.

Returned to Italy after the war, she became a member of the national presidency of the feminist association Unione Donne in Italia (Union of Women in Italy, also known as UDI). In April 1963 Di Vittorio was elected deputy for the Communist Party, and in 1968 she became a senator.
