= Palmiro Togliatti =

Italian politician and statesman (1893–1964)

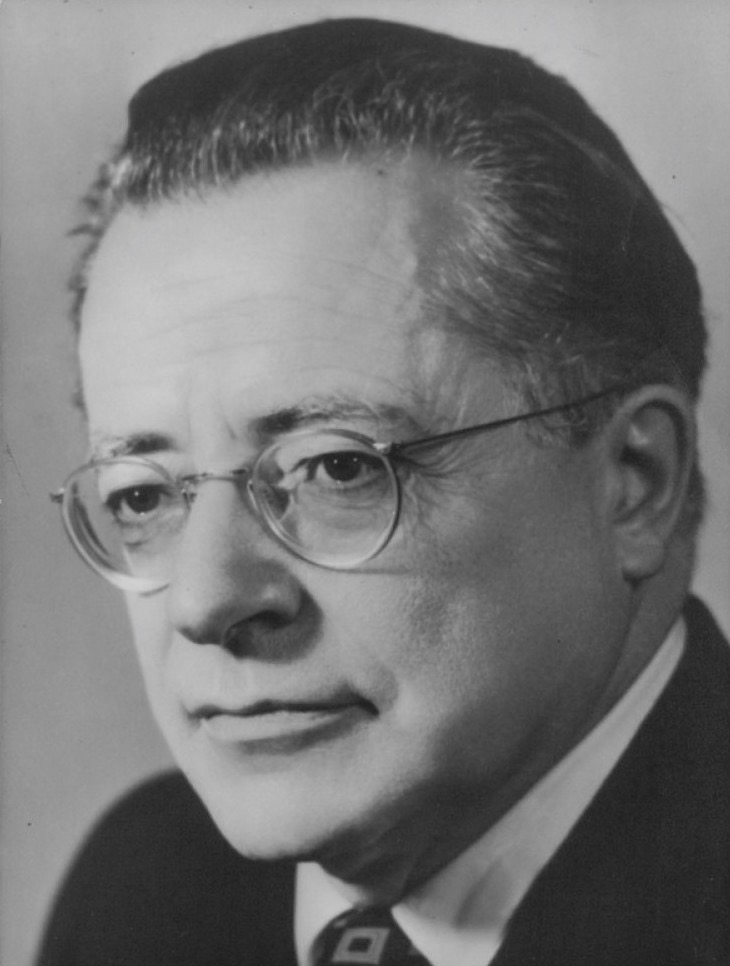

General Secretary of the Italian Communist Party
- In office May 1938 – August 1964
- Preceded by: Ruggero Grieco
- Succeeded by: Luigi Longo
- In office November 1926 – January 1934
- Preceded by: Antonio Gramsci
- Succeeded by: Ruggero Grieco

Minister of Grace and Justice
- In office 21 June 1945 – 1 July 1946
- Prime Minister: Alcide De Gasperi
- Preceded by: Umberto Tupini
- Succeeded by: Fausto Gullo

Deputy Prime Minister of Italy
- In office 12 December 1944 – 21 June 1945
- Prime Minister: Ivanoe Bonomi
- Preceded by: Himself (June 1944)
- Succeeded by: Manlio Brosio; Pietro Nenni
- In office 24 April 1944 – 18 June 1944
- Prime Minister: Pietro Badoglio
- Preceded by: Office established
- Succeeded by: Himself; Giulio Rodinò (December 1944)

Minister without portfolio
- In office 24 April 1944 – 12 June 1945
- Prime Minister: Pietro Badoglio; Ivanoe Bonomi

Member of the Chamber of Deputies
- In office 8 May 1948 – 21 August 1964
- Constituency: Rome (1948–1953; 1958–1964); Italy at-large (1953–1958)

Member of the Constituent Assembly
- In office 25 June 1946 – 31 January 1948
- Constituency: Italy at-large

Personal details
- Born: Palmiro Michele Nicola Togliatti; 26 March 1893 Genoa, Kingdom of Italy
- Died: 21 August 1964 (aged 71) Yalta, Soviet Union
- Party: PSI (1914–1921); PCd'I (1921–1943); PCI (1943–1964)
- Spouse: Rita Montagnana (m. 1924; sep. 1948)
- Domestic partner: Nilde Iotti (1948–1964; his death)
- Children: 2
- Education: University of Turin
- Profession: Journalist; politician
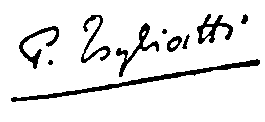
- Signature

Palmiro Michele Nicola Togliatti (Italian: [palˈmiːro toʎˈʎatti]; 26 March 1893 – 21 August 1964) was an Italian politician and statesman who led the Italian Communist Party (Partito Comunista Italiano, PCI) for nearly forty years, from 1927 until his death. Born into a middle-class family, Togliatti received an education in law at the University of Turin, later served as an officer and was wounded in World War I, and became a tutor. Described as "severe in approach but extremely popular among the Communist base" and "a hero of his time, capable of courageous personal feats", his supporters gave him the nickname il Migliore ("The Best"). In 1930, Togliatti renounced Italian citizenship, and he became a citizen of the Soviet Union; upon his death, a Soviet city was named after him. Considered one of the founding fathers of the Italian Republic, he led Italy's Communist party from a few thousand members in 1943 to two million members in 1946.

Born in Genoa but culturally formed in Turin during the 1900s and 1910s, when the first Fiat workshops were built and the Italian labour movement began its battles, Togliatti's history is linked to that of Lingotto. He helped launch the left-wing weekly L'Ordine Nuovo in 1919, and he was the editor of Il Comunista starting in 1922. He was a founding member of the Communist Party of Italy (Partito Comunista d'Italia, PCd'I), which was founded as the result of a split from the Italian Socialist Party (Partito Socialista Italiano, PSI) in 1921. In 1926, the PCd'I was made illegal, alongside the other parties, by Benito Mussolini's government. Togliatti was able to avoid the destiny of many of his fellow party members who were arrested only because he was in Moscow at the time.

From 1927 until his death, Togliatti was the secretary of Italy's Communist party, except for the period from 1934 to 1938, during which he served as Italian representative to the Communist International, earning the nickname il giurista del Comintern ("The Jurist of Comintern") from Leon Trotsky. After the dissolution of the Comintern in 1943 and the formation of the Cominform in 1947, Togliatti turned down the post of secretary-general offered to him by Joseph Stalin in 1951, preferring to remain at the head of the PCI, by then the largest Communist party in Western Europe. His relations to Moscow were a continuing subject of scholarly and political debate after his death.

From 1944 to 1945, Togliatti held the post of Deputy Prime Minister of Italy, and he was appointed Minister of Justice from 1945 to 1946 in the provisional governments that ruled Italy after the fall of Fascism. He was also a member of the Constituent Assembly of Italy. Togliatti inaugurated the PCI's peaceful and national road to socialism, or the "Italian Road to Socialism", the realisation of the communist project through democracy, repudiating the use of violence and applying the Italian Constitution in all its parts (a Communist government would operate under parliamentary democracy), a strategy that some date back to Antonio Gramsci, and that would since be the leitmotiv of the party's history; after his death, it helped to further the trend of Eurocommunism in Western Communist parties. He was the first Italian Communist to appear in television debates. Togliatti survived an assassination attempt in 1948, a car accident in 1950, and he died in 1964 during a holiday in Crimea on the Black Sea.

== Early life ==
=== Family ===
Togliatti was born on 26 March 1893 in Genoa, the capital city of the Italian region of Liguria, in the Kingdom of Italy, into a middle-class family, the third son of two school teachers. His father Antonio was also an accountant in the public administration, while his mother Teresa Vitale was an elementary school teacher. Togliatti later described his mother as "the central figure of the family". His father's job forced the family to move frequently to different cities. Before his birth, they moved from Turin to Genoa. He was named Palmiro because he was born on Palm Sunday; Togliatti's parents were observant Roman Catholics. Togliatti had one sister (Maria Cristina) and two brothers (Enrico and Eugenio Giuseppe). Eugenio Giuseppe Togliatti became a mathematician and discovered Togliatti surfaces.

=== Education and military service ===
In 1908, Togliatti studied at the Azuni classics high school (classical lyceum) in Sassari, where he was recognised as the best student in the school. After a series of studies concluded with an average of 30, the highest vote, Togliatti graduated in November 1915 with the thesis Il regime doganale delle colonie ("The colonial customs regime"), which was discussed with Luigi Einaudi. He also enrolled in the faculty of letters and philosophy. When his father died on 21 January 1911 of cancer, his family ended up in poverty; it was only thanks to a scholarship that Togliatti was able to graduate from the University of Turin with a degree in law in 1917. In 1914, Togliatti had entered politics by joining the Italian Socialist Party (PSI) prior to the First World War; however, he focused on his studies rather than activism. The war and his political activity prevented him from obtaining a second degree, and he fullt dedicated himself to politics starting in 1923.

At the outbreak of the First World War, Togliatti declared himself in favour Italy's intervention on the side of the Entente powers, a minority view among socialists who distinguished, in the words of Battista Santhià, "between the imperialist war and the just national claims against the old imperialisms; they did not consider it right that some Italian provinces should remain under the dominion of a foreign state [referring to Austria-Hungary's control of regions in northeastern Italy], moreover a reactionary one." According to Togliatti's brother Eugenio Giuseppe, Togliatti and Antonio Gramsci were "both hypercritical of the government's neutralist attitude and harshly anti-Giolittians".

The precise intellectual path of the young Togliatti is not clear. In the cultural climate of those years, the neo-idealistic and Hegelian currents were prevailing, and they ranged from the teaching of Benedetto Croce to the most exasperated expressions of nationalism and spiritualism. Togliatti would always declare that he remained a stranger to the latter; it is certain that Croce in particular, then La Voce of Giuseppe Prezzolini and Giovanni Papini, and Gaetano Salvemini and Romain Rolland had no small part in his youthful formation. The first approach to Marxism would have occurred all through the writings of Antonio Labriola; the decisive elements that led Togliatti to Marxist socialism were his friendship with Gramsci and the concrete social reality of Turin, which saw the development of a strong and organised workers' movement.

Initially permanently discharged from military service due to physical incapacity (a severe short-sightedness), Togliatti served as a volunteer army officer during the war, and he was later wounded in action and sent home to recuperate. In 1915, he had volunteered for the Red Cross, serving in various hospitals, including at the front. Meanwhile, wartime needs led the military commands to review the enlistment criteria, so he was declared able and enlisted in 1916; he was assigned to the 54th Infantry Regiment and then moved, at his request, to the 2nd Alpini Regiment. In 1917, Togliatti was admitted to the official cadet course in Caserta; he passed it but did not obtain the appointment as an officer due to a serious pleurisy that had occurred in the meantime. He gained the rank of caporale maggiore (major corporal) in health care, and he was discharged in December 1918 at the end of a long leave.

=== L'Ordine Nuovo ===
Returning at the end of the conflict, Togliatti was a part of the group around Gramsci's L'Ordine Nuovo paper in Turin, while working as a tutor. Like the other founders of L'Ordine Nuovo, Togliatti was an admirer of the Russian Revolution of 1917 and strongly supported the immediate creation of soviets in Italy. He believed that existing factory councils of workers could be strengthened so that they could become the basis of a communist revolution. Initially, the newspaper, which was founded with union backing, focused on cultural politics. In June 1919, the month following its founding, Gramsci and Togliatti pushed out Angelo Tasca and re-focused as a revolutionary voice. The newspaper reached a circulation of 6,000 by the end of the year and its reputation was heightened by its support of the April 1920 general strike, while the PSI and the affiliated General Confederation of Labour did not support it. On 1 January 1921, the paper began to be published daily.

Like Gramsci, Togliatti took an interest in association football, which was becoming a sport with massive following, and was said to have been a supporter of Juventus, as were other notable communist and left-wing leaders. Allegedly, Togliatti used to ask Pietro Secchia every Monday morning (according to others, the interlocutor was Luigi Longo) what Juventus had done the day before; if the interlocutor did not have an answer, Togliatti was said to reply: "And you, do you expect to make the revolution without knowing the results of Juventus?" Some alleged that "What did Juventus do?" was the first question Togliatti had asked upon awakening after his assassination attempt on 14 July 1948. That same year, he had been pictured at the stadium with Gianni Agnelli.

== Communist Party of Italy ==
=== Founding and Bolshevisation ===
Togliatti was a member of the communist faction within the PSI, which was part of the Communist International, commonly known as the Comintern. On 21 January 1921, following a split in the PSI on their 17th Congress in Livorno, he was one of the founders of the Communist Party of Italy (PCd'I). The PCd'I was formed by L'Ordine Nuovo group led by Gramsci and the culturalist faction led by Angelo Tasca. At the founding of the party, Togliatti held Bordigist positions, while between 1926 and 1929 he was closer to Bukharinism.

In the 1921 Italian general election held on 15 May, the PSI suffered losses but remained the largest party, while the PCd'I achieved 4.6% of the votes and 15 seats. In 1923, some members of the party were arrested and put on trial for alleged conspiracy against the state. This allowed the intense activity of the Comintern to deprive the party's left-wing of authority and give control to the minority centre, which had aligned with Moscow. In 1924 and 1925, the Comintern began a campaign of Bolshevisation that forced each party to conform to the discipline and orders of Moscow.

The policy of Bolshevisation moved Gramsci to write a letter in 1926 to the Comintern in which he deplored the opposition led by Leon Trotsky but also underlined some presumed faults of Joseph Stalin. Togliatti, who was in Moscow as a representative of the party, received the letter, opened it, read it, and decided not to deliver it. This caused a difficult conflict between Gramsci and Togliatti, one that they never completely resolved. According to the journalists Mario Pendinelli and Marcello Sorgi, Togliatti did this because he was aware that Gramsci's hegemony and war of maneuver theories contrasted with Stalin's Marxist–Leninist orthodoxy; he kept the letter along with Gramsci's Prison Notebooks and gave them to a journalist.

=== Fascist regime ===
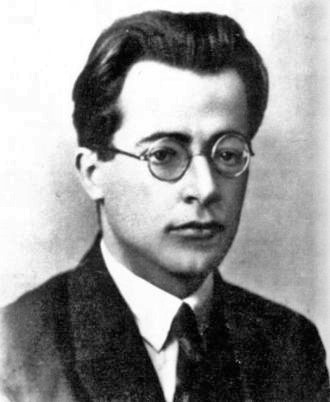
Togliatti in the 1920s

In October 1922, Benito Mussolini, leader of the National Fascist Party (PNF), took advantage of a general strike by workers and announced his demands to the government to give the PNF political power or face a coup d'état. With no immediate response, a small number of Italian fascists began a long trek across Italy to Rome that was called the March on Rome, and told Italians that they were intending to restore law and order. Mussolini himself did not participate until the very end of the march, with Gabriele d'Annunzio being hailed as leader of the march, until it was revealed that he had been pushed out of a window and severely wounded in a failed assassination attempt. This deprived d'Annunzio of the possibility of leading the coup orchestrated by an organisation he himself had founded. Under the leadership of Mussolini, the Fascists demanded Luigi Facta's resignation as prime minister of Italy and that Mussolini be named prime minister. Although the Italian army was far better armed than the Fascist paramilitaries, the Italian government under Victor Emmanuel III faced a political crisis. The King was forced to choose which of the two rival movements in Italy would form the government: Mussolini's Fascists, or the anti-monarchist PSI. He selected the Fascists and appointed Mussolini as the new prime minister.

Initially, Togliatti minimised the dictatorial aspects of the new Fascist government. In the same year, he said: "The fascist government, which is the dictatorship of the bourgeoisie, will have no interest in getting rid of any of the traditional democratic prejudices." Upon taking power, attacks by the Blackshirts on communist militants increased, as did their arrests. In August 1923, Mussolini pushed through the Italian Parliament a new electoral law named after its drafter Giacomo Acerbo, the Acerbo Law, which assigned two-thirds of the seats to the list that had exceeded 25% of the votes. Togliatti wrote that "fascism gained power by dispersing the proletarians aggregates, preventing their unification on any terrain, and cause a unification around it in favour of the bourgeois political groups."

In the 1924 Italian general election, the National List of Mussolini (an alliance with liberals and conservatives) used intimidation tactics, resulting in a landslide victory and a subsequent two-thirds majority, while the PCd'I gained 3.7% of votes and 19 seats. In January 1926, Togliatti co-authored with Gramsci the thesis of the third congress of the PCd'I. Later that same year, the party was banned by the Fascist government, and Amadeo Bordiga and Gramsci were arrested and imprisoned on the island of Ustica. Togliatti was one of few leaders not to be arrested, as he was attending a meeting of the Comintern in Moscow. After Gramsci's arrest, Togliatti became the leader of the party, which moved to Paris.

In the 1930s, Togliatti was able to survive in the Soviet Union, having renounced Italian citizenship for a Soviet one, despite the Great Purge. While in Moscow, he made an analysis on fascism, including its rise in Italy, and he began to construct a strategy that was based on broad alliances of middle-class categories. His partito nuovo (English: New Party), that would come into reality in 1943, had an interclassist dimension and was open to "the demands and mental structures of the middle classes". During World War II, he broadcast messages of resistance to Italy, and he also tried to appeal to fascist rank and file in order for them to join forces with liberal and left-wing anti-fascist elements.

=== Exile ===
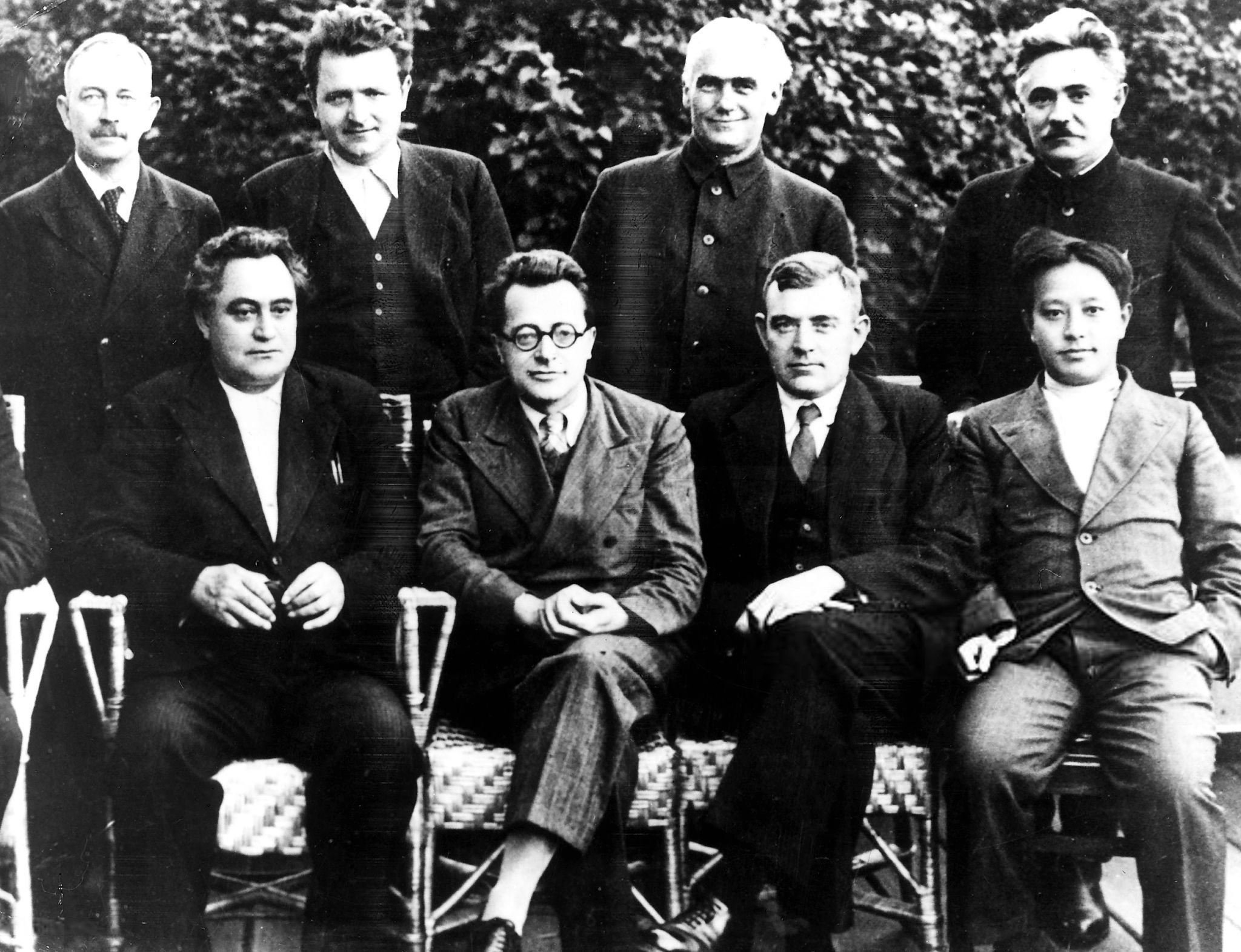
Members of the Executive Committee of the Comintern at the 7th World Congress, 1935 Seated (from left to right): Georgi Dimitrov, Togliatti, Wilhelm Florin, Wang Ming. Standing (from left to right): Otto Kuusinen, Dmitry Manuilsky, Klement Gottwald, and Wilhelm Pieck

In 1927, Togliatti was elected as the party's general-secretary in place of Gramsci. In exile during the late 1920s and the 1930s, he organised clandestine meetings of the party at Lyon (1926) and Cologne (1931). In 1927, he took the position of secretary of the party. In 1935, under the nom de guerre Ercole Ercoli, he was named member of the secretariat of the Comintern, and he was later involved in the Spanish Civil War. In 1939, he was arrested in France; upon being released, he moved to the Soviet Union and remained there during World War II, broadcasting radio messages on Radio Milano-Libertà to Italy, in which he called for resistance to Nazi Germany and the Italian Social Republic. While in Moscow, he was accused by critics of not doing enough to help fellow communists and others in Fascist Italy. He was aware that the party's clandestine organisation and resistance to fascism would not have been possible without Soviet support, and it was for this reason that he flattened to Stalinist positions.

In August 1936, the Comintern published a manifesto, titled "For the Salvation of Italy and the Reconciliation of the Italian People", which was allegedly written by Togliatti. It was addressed to "the blackshirt brothers" and appealed for unity between Communists and Fascists. It read: "We Communists have made ours the Fascist programme of 1919, which is a programme of peace, liberty and defence of the interests of the workers. ... The Fascist programme of 1919 has not been realised! Let's struggle united for the realisation of this programme." In March 1941, Togliatti told the Comintern that the strength of Fascism lay not only in violence. He said: "This dictatorship has done something – not just by means of violence. It has done something even for the workers and the young. We cannot deny that the introduction of social security is a fact."

Those appeals to fascists were not limited to Togliatti. Giuseppe Di Vittorio wrote a letter to a Fascist union leader and asked him: "Between communists and fascists in good faith, are there any possibilities of working together, for the well-being of the Italian people and for the progressive march of our country?" The context for those appeals dates back to an August 1936 party meeting in Paris, where Togliatti's brother-in-law Mario Montagnana said: "We must have the courage to say that we do not intend to overthrow fascism... we want to improve fascism today because we can't do more." The aforementioned appeal to the Blackshirts was written by Ruggero Grieco, Togliatti's successor as party leader during his time at the Comintern, and was published in Lo Stato Operaio in August 1936 with the apocryphal signature of Togliatti and all the main Communist leaders. In later years, Togliatti described the manifesto as "a coglioneria".

At the same time, the party and its militants were actively involved in the resistance to Mussolini's regime through clandestine action. They were well prepared for clandestine activity because of the structure of their organisation, and the fact that they had been victims of systematic repression by the authorities; more than three quarters of the political prisoners between 1926 and 1943 were communists. Throughout the dictatorship, the party was able to maintain and feed a clandestine network, distribute propaganda leaflets and newspapers, and infiltrate fascist unions and youth organisations. In 1935, the party led a campaign against the Second Italo-Ethiopian War. The party and communist partisans, among others, then went on to play a major role in the Italian resistance movement that led to the fall of the Fascist regime in Italy, and Togliatti became a revolutionary constituent and constitutionalist of the Italian Republic, of which he is considered a founding father. In this role, he helped shaping a constitutional anti-fascism, which was significant because it called for societal transformations.

On 15 May 1943, the party changed its official name to Partito Comunista Italiano (Italian Communist Party). This change was not surprising as PCI started being used as the party's acronym around 1924 and 1925. This name change also reflected a change in the Comintern's role, as it increasingly became a federation of national Communist parties. This trend accelerated after Vladimir Lenin's death and its new name emphasised the party's shift from an international focus to an Italian one. At the time, it was a hotly contested issue for the two major factions of the party. On one side, the Soviets preferred the single world party as it was internationalist and strongly centralised, while on the other side the Italians wanted a party more tailored to their nation's peculiarities and more autonomy. Togliatti returned to Italy in March 1944, after 18 years of exile in Switzerland, France, Soviet Union, and Spain where, with the cover name of Alfredo, he represented the Comintern in the Garibaldi Battalion during the Spanish Civil War.

== Secretary of the Italian Communist Party ==
=== Salerno Turn and national unity governments ===
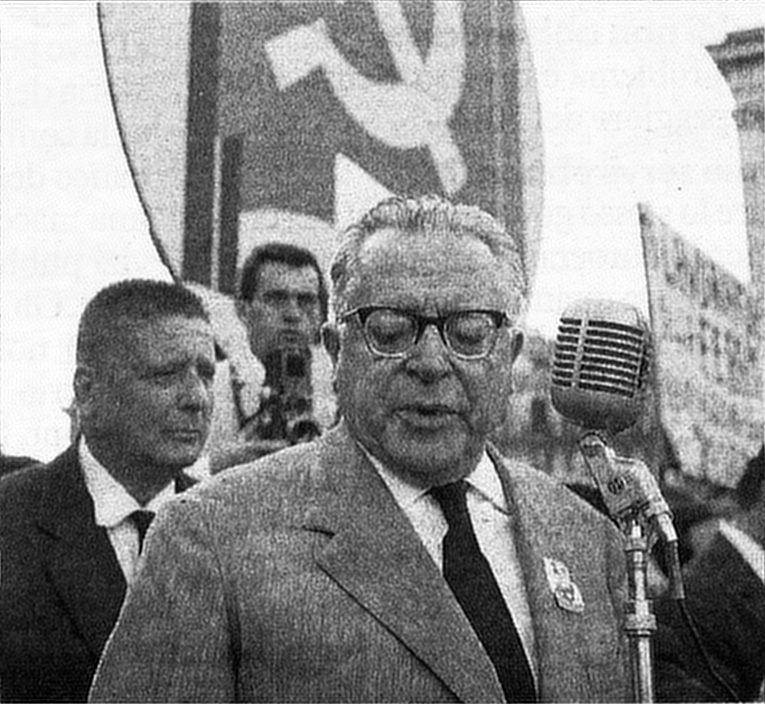
Togliatti during a rally

On 2 April 1944, Togliatti returned from Moscow to Italy, and led the renamed Italian Communist Party (PCI) and other political forces to the svolta di Salerno, variously referred to in English as the Salerno Turn, the Salerno Turning Point, and the U-turn at Salerno, the city where this took place. This was a compromise between anti-fascist parties, the monarchy of Italy, and the then prime minister Pietro Badoglio to set up a government of national unity and to postpone institutional questions. In doing so, he resolved the stall resulted from the Bari's congress back in January 1944. Togliatti also founded a political journal, Rinascita, following his return to Italy in 1944, which he edited until his death.

With the Salerno Turn, the PCI committed to supporting democracy and to abandon the armed struggle for the cause of socialism. In doing so, the U-turn had the effect to have moved the party to the right, in contrast with many demands from within; it also meant the disarmament of those members of the Italian resistance movement that had been organised by the PCI. During the resistance to fascism, the PCI became increasingly popular, as the majority of partisans were communists. The Garibaldi Brigades, promoted by the PCI, were among the more numerous partisan forces.

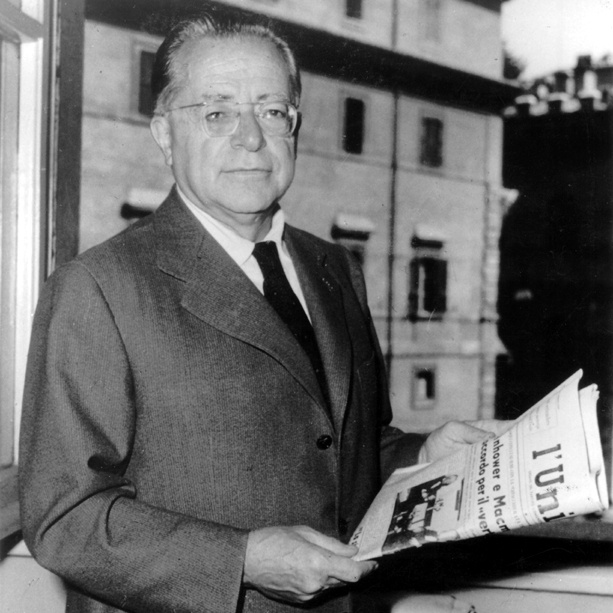
Togliatti with a copy of l'Unità newspaper in the 1950s

Starting with the second Badoglio government, the national unity government including the PCI, Togliatti held several positions in the Italian government. From April 1944 to June 1945, he was both a minister without portfolio and Deputy Prime Minister of Italy under Badoglio (April–December 1944) and Ivanoe Bonomi (December 1944–June 1945). From June 1945 to July 1946, he also served as the Italian Minister of Justice under Ferruccio Parri and Alcide De Gasperi. Adversaries not only on an ideological level, Togliatti and De Gasperi proved skilled mediators in a difficult moment for Italy. As the Italian Minister of Justice, Togliatti's pragmatism was put to the test when he approved, not without internal disapproval within the PCI, an amnesty.

The amnesty bearing Togliatti's name was controversial because, in addition to partisans, who were in less numbers compared to the fascists and their collaborators in terms of crimes, pardoned and reduced sentences for Italian fascists, excluding the most grave crimes, as well as those committed by high-ranking officials and crimes committed for material gain or carried out with excessive cruelty but did not include rape or sexual torture, which were still pardonable. The amnesty was considered necessary both for the unity of the country and for the rebuilding of the Italian nation after the war.

The result of the final draft for the amnesty law-decree was a compromise between the PCI, which wanted to keep the fascists imprisoned, and the DC, which wanted the fascists pardoned and accepted an amnesty for partisans as the compromise. In practice, the amnesty, which was supported by Allied Force Headquarters in Italy, led to an increase in prosecution of partisan crimes, while fascist crimes were treated more leniently; fascists and their collaborators benefited far more from the amnesty than imprisoned partisans, who were treated as common criminals. Later less publicised pardons and releases on parole between 1947 and 1953, when Togliatti was no longer the Italian Minister of Justice, further reduced sentences for political crimes committed during the war and turned Italy's amnesty into an amnesia.

=== Constituent Assembly and 1947 May crisis ===
At the 1946 Italian general election, which was held at the same time (2 June) as the 1946 Italian institutional referendum won by republican supporters, the PCI was the third political force behind the DC and the PSI, and obtained 19% of the votes and 104 seats in the new Constituent Assembly of Italy, where Togliatti was elected as a member. In 2015, historian Giuseppe Vacca recounted the significant role that Togliatti played in the work of the Constituent Assembly. Togliatti was the only Communist leader to participate in the foundation of a democratic republic according to the canons of a European constitutionalism. In the work of defining the republican Constitution of Italy, Togliatti collaborated with the jurist Giuseppe Dossetti.

On 24 September 1946, Togliatti gave a speech at the municipal theater of Reggio Emilia. In this speech, he argued the historical-political reasons that required the construction of a solid relationship with the middle classes. In doing so, Togliatti placed himself in many respects in the tradition of the Italian socialist movement, whose legacy he openly claimed, while at the same time he defined the originality and modernity of the new party with respect to the old reformism in the capacity to go beyond that particularist and classist system that had pushed the PSI to privilege the reasons of the labourers to the detriment of those of the sharecroppers and small owners, which helped to determine a social fracture in which fascism would have entered. According to Togliatti, the relationship with the middle classes was essential, both for the rooting of the PCI and for the realisation of that pact between producers that was at the heart of the economic policy proposal he launched in August 1946 in l'Unità with an explicit reference to Franklin D. Roosevelt's New Deal. This new course and its realisation were considered necessary to permanently overcome the social tensions that had crossed the country and for the success of the Salerno turning point.

In January 1947, Togliatti acknowledged De Gasperi as "the main exponent of the strongest among the popular and democratic parties on which the government will have to be based". In March 1947, in opposition to the dominant line in his own party, Togliatti voted for the inclusion of the Lateran Pacts in the Constitution of Italy, where it became its Article 7. Togliatti said the vote in favour of his party was more due to political responsibility than personal conviction. Communist ministers were evicted during the May 1947 crisis in both Italy and France after United States involvement. The same month also saw the Portella della Ginestra massacre of communist Sicilian peasants on 1 May. As in Italy, the French Communist Party (PCF) was a major party, taking part in the three-parties alliance known as Tripartisme, and became the largest party after scoring 28.3% at the November 1946 French legislative election. As was done by the United States in Italy, Maurice Thorez, head of the PCF, was forced to quit Paul Ramadier's government along with the four other party ministers. The crisis contributed to the start of the Cold War in Western Europe. Under Togliatti, the PCI became the largest Communist party in Western Europe.

=== Popular Democratic Front and assassination attempt ===
In his 26 September 1947 speech at the Constituent Assembly calling for his vote of no confidence in the fourth De Gasperi government, Togliatti said: "Our goal is the creation in our country of a free and equal society, in which there is no exploitation by men of other men." In 1948, Togliatti led the PCI in the first democratic election after World War II. The 1948 Italian general election resulted in a win for Christian Democracy (Democrazia Cristiana, DC) while the Popular Democratic Front (Fronte Democratico Popolare, FDP), the left-wing coalition of the PCI and the PSI respectively led by Togliatti and Pietro Nenni, achieved 31% of the votes, and the PCI returned 131 deputies to Parliament. Despite the loss, Togliatti himself was elected to Italy's Chamber of Deputies.

As it was held at the dawn of the Cold War, after the exclusion of left-wing parties from several European government at the request of the United States, the 1948 election was "potentially even more explosive than it had been in 1945", and was thus significantly affected by this. It was marred by foreign electoral interventions, in particular by the United States through heavy funding, propaganda, and covert operations, a practice that continued in the subsequent decades, with the CIA in turn accusing the Soviets of having responded by sending exorbitant funds to the FDP, a claim disputed by the PCI, which voiced its frustration at the Soviets' lack of support for the FDP's campaign to counteract that of the United States and its allies. Italian historian Alessandro Brogi dismissed the CIA's claims as "overexaggerated" and observed that the Soviets only undertook "ad hoc last minute diplomatic [and] financial action" because it feared that inaction in Italy would set a precedent for American intervention in Eastern Europe. Despite amicable meetings in the post-war years between Secchia and Stalin, the Soviets were apprehensive about committing to Italy financially, and only provided "occasional and modest" funds to the PCI. Togliatti himself, who was taunted with banners stating "Togliatti—do you understand? Go back to Russia!", argued that the election had not been free, citing interferences by both the United States and the Vatican. On 22 April, four days after the defeat of the FDP in the election, Togliatti said: "The elections were not free ... Brutal foreign intervention was used consisting of a threat to starve the country by withholding ERP [Marshall Plan] aid if it voted for the Democratic Front ... The menace to use the atom bomb against [pro-FDP] towns or regions."

On 14 July 1948, at about 11:40 am, Togliatti was shot three times, being severely wounded by Antonio Pallante, a neo-fascist student, who had strong anti-communist views and was a militant of the Common Man's Front. Togliatti's life hung in the balance for days and news about his condition was uncertain, causing an acute political crisis in Italy, with civil war and insurrection implications, which included a general strike called by the Italian General Confederation of Labour, as well as portraits of Togliatti being brought in during the celebration of the storming of the Bastille and a telegram from Stalin. Upon regaining consciousness, Togliatti himself was instrumental in calling for calm and a return to normalcy; from his hospital bed, he reassured his comrades and tried to pacify spirits, averting the danger of an armed insurrection. He preferred the "Italian Road to Socialism" over a violent revolution, and rejected the concept of an internationally directed movement in favour of one that was both democratically and nationally oriented. Historian Sergio Turone described it as "the most complete and most extensive general strike ever in the history of Italy". In January 2023, it was publicly revealed that Pallante had died on 6 July 2022, aged 98, and that he never regretted the shooting.

=== 1950s and 1960s ===
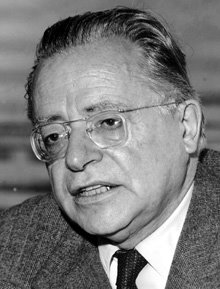
A portrait of Togliatti in the 1950s

On 22 August 1950, a car accident caused Togliatti to crack the frontal bone and fracture a vertebra. As with the 1948 assassination attempt, the event caused an international sensation, and was followed by an investigation, which blamed the accident on "the unacceptable levity of fellow driver Aldo Zaia". At the time, no one was aware that in October 1950 he had lost consciousness and went into a coma; his doctor suspected that Togliatti had been poisoned. Togliatti was saved by brain surgery. During his period of convalescence in a Piedmontese clinic, it was reported that Togliatti had played chess with the Italian senator and fellow party member Cino Moscatelli. In December 1951, within the context of the birth of the Gladio anti-communist organisation, spy microphones were set up in Togliatti's house by the head of the Supervisory Commission, and were intended to also monitor his partner, Nilde Iotti, who was suspected of being in contact with Vatican circles.

Under Togliatti's leadership, the PCI became the second largest party in Italy and the largest non-ruling Communist party in Europe. Although permanently in the opposition at the national level during his lifetime, the party ran many municipalities and held great power at the local and regional level in certain areas. In 1953, Togliatti fought against the Scam Law, an electoral legislation passed by the DC-led majority of the time, which aimed at using first-past-the-post to augment its power. Ultimately, the law was to prove of no use for the government in the elections of that year, where the PCI won 22.6% of the vote and confirmed itself as the first party within the parliamentary opposition and the second biggest party after the DC. It was repealed in July 1954.

Togliatti was re-elected to the Chamber of Deputies, and he remained a member of Parliament until his death in 1964. Despite his close relationship with the Soviet Union, Togliatti's leadership remained unscathed after the 1956 Hungarian Revolution, which was in most countries a cause for major conflicts within the political left. He developed a theory of unity in diversity within the Communist parties in all countries, which he outlined in a Rinascita article in December 1961, and named polycentrism.

=== "Italian Road to Socialism" ===
After the Khrushchev Thaw in the Soviet Union, Togliatti was inspired by the new set of reforms and launched the party program of the "Italian Road to Socialism". He said: "We are democrats in that we are not only anti-fascists, but socialists and communists. There is no contradiction between democracy and socialism." The new policy proposed by Togliatti was opposed to any revolutionary means of gaining power and aimed at accompanying institutional action with the extension of social and trade union struggles, and supported the concept of peaceful coexistence. During this period, the PCI purged revolutionary and extremist factions opposed to the new openly reformist line. On 15 February 1956, Il Nuovo Corriere della Sera published on the front page a correspondence by Piero Ottone on the five-hour speech with which Khrushchev the previous day explained to the 1,400 Soviet delegates and the leaders of international Communism, including Togliatti and Mauro Scoccimarro, the new strategies of communism. The main points of Khrushchev's speech were the peaceful coexistence between the blocs, the prevention of war, and the forms of transition of the various countries to socialism that, in the words of Ottone, means "the forces of socialism can assert themselves without revolutions, without civil wars, through parliamentary processes", akin to Togliatti's "Italian Way to Socialism" that was first inaugurated with the Salerno turning point and that he reiterated in his speech of response.

In the 1958 Italian general election, the number of votes for the PCI was still on the rise. In the 1963 Italian general election, the PCI gained 25.2% of the votes but again failed to reach a relative majority. Nonetheless, the 1963 election ended centrism as party system and resulted in the first centre-left government in the history of the Italian Republic, with the PSI giving its first external support, a system of government known as the organic centre-left. In 1961, Togliatti said: "We are a party that is on the side of those who fight in defense of their freedom." During the early 1960s, Togliatti appealed to the Catholic world. In a 1963 speech in Bergamo, titled "The Destiny of Man", he called for a common front between the religious and communists against consumerism and the commodification of life, and that this opposition must act as a bridge between them. In August 1964, Togliatti went to the Soviet Union and wrote the Yalta Memorandum. Published after his death, Togliatti's memorandum that outlined his political doctrine strengthened the trend toward liberalisation within the international Communist movement and Communist governments. Additionally, he made various criticisms of the Soviet leadership, including the perceived slowness with which it was leaving behind the Stalinist legacy. The historian Giuseppe Vacca saw the memorandum as a generalised critique of the Soviet system.

== Personal life ==
From 1924 to 1948, Togliatti was married to fellow party member and politician Rita Montagnana. Until his death, he was in a relationship with Nilde Iotti, also a fellow party member and politician. This relationship was controversial due to the fact that he was already married and the moralistic austerity that distinguished the PCI at the time. Iotti would become the first woman in the history of the Italian Republic to hold by the end of the 1970s one of the three highest offices of the state, namely the presidency of the Chamber of Deputies. Togliatti was a supporter of women's rights, with the Noi donne feminist magazine describing him at his death as "a great supporter of women's emancipation".

== Death and funeral ==
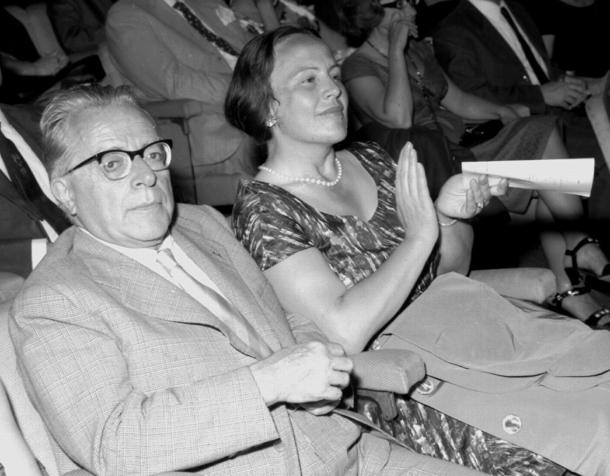
Togliatti and Nilde Iotti before 1964

On 21 August 1964, Togliatti died as a result of a cerebral haemorrhage, while vacationing with his companion Nilde Iotti in Yalta, in the Crimean Oblast of the Ukrainian SSR, then part of the Soviet Union. The day before, he had been urgently hospitalised as a result of a stroke, for which he underwent surgery; he was 71. According to some of his collaborators, Togliatti was traveling to the Soviet Union to give his support to Leonid Brezhnev's election as Nikita Khrushchev's successor at the head of Communist Party of the Soviet Union. His favourite pupil, Enrico Berlinguer, was later elected as his successor to the National Secretary of the PCI position; Berlinguer's time in office saw the Historic Compromise and the moral question. The news of Togliatti's death was first given by Italy's leading agency ANSA. The party's newspaper l'Unità described him as "a great son of the Italian people, a brilliant leader of international communism, a fighter who spent his whole life in a hard and tireless struggle for socialism, for democracy, for peace."

The Soviet Russian city of Stavropol-on-Volga, where Togliatti had been instrumental in establishing the AutoVAZ (Russian: Lada) automobile manufacturing plant in collaboration with Fiat, was renamed after him (in Russian: Tolyatti, as transliterated from Тольятти, the Russian spelling of his name) in his honor in 1964, after his death. One of the main town squares in the Croatian city of Rijeka was named after Togliatti while Croatia was part of SFR Yugoslavia, until it was renamed to Jadranski trg (Adriatic Plaza) in 1994. There is still a street in Belgrade named after him (Serbian: ulica Palmira Toljatija, Улица Палмира Тољатија). Togliatti's funeral, held on 24 August 1964, was attended by a million and saw much popular participation, comparable to that of Berlinguer years later; about 500,000 people followed Togliatti's coffin making its way in Rome.

A 1972 painting by Renato Guttuso, titled I funerali di Togliatti, was made to recreate the event. The painting includes, in addition to Iotti, Brezhnev, and Berlinguer, notable global Communist movement figures and others whom Guttuso imagines being present at the funeral, such as Vladimir Lenin, Joseph Stalin, Pablo Picasso, Pablo Neruda, Elio Vittorini, Angela Davis, Antonio Gramsci, Dolores Ibárruri, Anna Kuliscioff, and Jean-Paul Sartre. Curzio Malaparte described Togliatti as the thinking head of Italian Communism.

== Legacy ==
The Salerno Turn anticipated the "Italian Way to Socialism" and the Eurocommunist trend. While its motives have been widely discussed and argued about by scholars, the national peculiarity of the PCI is not limited to Togliatti and is well-founded by the fact that it was a co-founder of the Italian Republic and its constitution, as well as its significant contribution to the resistance against Nazi–fascism and its mass base. The PCI under Togliatti and their attitude towards the Marshall Plan is placed within the context of the Cold War and anti-communism. After orchestrating the fall of the PCI and PSI from government, amid a crisis within the DC and fears that a left-wing coalition would take power, the United States and George Marshall had informed the Italian government that anti-communism was a pre-condition for receiving American aid, and James Clement Dunn had directly asked Alcide de Gasperi to dissolve the parliament and remove the PCI. Additionally, the United States provided support to anti-PCI groups in 1948, and reiterated that should the PCI win, the Marshall Plan and other aids could be terminated. (Note: This was further corroborated by Luigi Einaudi, who wrote in his diary of a dinner at the home of Pietro Quaroni, the Italian Ambassador to the Soviet Union, that it was agreed the United States would not grant real aid with the PCI still in government. Stazi, Guido (30 October 2021). "Sessanta anni senza Einaudi, il governatore che da Chigi salì al Colle". MF Milano Finanza (in Italian). "Einaudi annotava nel suo Diario di una cena a casa dell'Ambasciatore d'Italia in Unione Sovietica Quaroni, in cui si conveniva che gli Stati Uniti gli aiuti veri non li avrebbero concessi con i comunisti ancora al governo." [Einaudi noted in his Diary of a dinner at the home of the Italian Ambassador to the Soviet Union Quaroni, in which it was agreed that the United States would not grant real aid with the Communists still in government.]) According to one estimate, the United States spent about $10–20 million on anti-communist propaganda and other covert operations, much of it through the Economic Cooperation Administration of the Marshall Plan, and then laundered through individual banks. Fearful of a possible electoral victory for a left-wing coalition, the British and American governments also undermined their campaign for legal justice by tolerating the efforts made by Italy's top authorities to prevent any of the alleged Italian war criminals from being extradited and taken to court. For their part, the Soviets would fund the PCI until 1984, and the party relied on Soviet financial assistance more than any other Communist party supported by Moscow. United States and Soviet interference and funding led to criticism of the other and accusing each other of going too far. United States government sources said that the PCI was receiving $40–50 million per year from the Soviets when their investment in Italy was stated to be $5–6 million; declassified information showed this to be exaggerated.

Liberal and left-wing critics saw Togliatti's policy of the Salerno Turn as an example of frontism, or common front, that was orchestrated by Stalin to conform to his deals with Franklin D. Roosevelt and Winston Churchill. In contrast to the mainstream and long-time held historiography of the PCI, Elena Aga Rossi and Victor Zaslavsky argued in a historical revisionist account that Togliatti and the other leaders of the PCI were fundamentally subservient to Stalin, and did their best to promote Soviet interests. They argued that Togliatti was above all a Stalinist, and that he remained one for years after Stalin died in 1953 and the Soviet Union had repudiated much of his legacy. They further argued that it was Stalin who ordered Togliatti to play a moderating role in Italian politics because the time was not yet ripe for a showdown with capitalism. Aga Rossi and Zaslavsky relied not only on Togliatti's papers but those of the Kremlin, especially the highly detailed reports sent in by the Soviet ambassador in Rome. Stalin forced the PCI to reject and work against the Marshall Plan, despite the loss of much support from Italian voters who wanted the American aid. First published in 1997, this view was criticised by Luciano Canfora. (Note: Canfora described the book by Elena Aga Rossi and Victor Zaslavsky as "a vibrant pamphlet that exploits some documents, rhapsodically selected and mostly already known, with the very firm intention of demonstrating a single assumption: that the PCI's policy was always and totally subordinate to Stalin's directives." According to Canfora, what he described as the prejudicial anti-communism of the book reached, in his own words, an "exhilarating aspect" when the two authors accused the PCI of an insurrectionist drift. He stated that the party considered the possibility of reacting with arms only if the United States "had intervened to prevent the imminent political elections" of April 1948. Since he said the thesis of Aga Rossi and Zaslavsky was that "communism is evil", a PCI that would have tried to defend itself and not to be overwhelmed did nothing but practiced evil, and critically wrote: "Rarely had one fallen so low in a self-styled book of history." Regarding the Salerno Turn, Aga Rossi and Zaslavsky argued that the occupying Allied powers would have supported the National Liberation Committee (CLN) government, which would have removed Badoglio from power, ignoring, according to Canfora, "how tenaciously the English government supported the King and Badoglio". By reconstructing the story and downsizing Togliatti's role, Canfora argued that Aga Rossi and Zaslavsky arrived at a result that they did not intend, the one for which Stalin was "gigantic in diplomatic ability, farsightedness, and moderation". Canfora's conclusion was that if the authors "had really intended to do the noble job of scholars of history", they would have tried to understand the reasons for Togliatti's oscillations on such a tormented political choice, writing that "if they hadn't chosen to reduce the characters of that affair, either to mere tools or to evil geniuses, they would perhaps have had the result that a historian should care most about: understanding.") Canfora saw the Salerno Turn and 1944 as a rebirth of Italy's Communist party, and said that "the PCI had gradually followed a path which required it, as a historical task, to occupy the space of social democracy in the Italian political panorama." In the words of Franco Lo Piparo, Togliatti's "Italian Road to Socialism" entailed "social democracy using communist rhetoric".

In February 1992, during the electoral campaign for the imminent general election, the historian Franco Andreucci published an incomplete and manipulated version in the weekly news magazine Panorama, the excerpt of a holographic letter from Togliatti (then known as Ercoli, a Soviet citizen since 1930, member of the military commission of the executive committee of the Comintern) from the Moscow archives, in a correspondence sent from Ufa on 15 February 1943 and written in response to a letter from the PCI leader Vincenzo Bianco who asked Togliatti to intercede with the Soviet authorities to avoid death of prisoners of the Italian Army in Russia. The manipulation of some words and phrases of the text in the letter reported in the weekly was discovered only ten days later, and it negatively affected the electoral campaign of the PCI's legal successor party, the Democratic Party of the Left (PDS). Andreucci had corrected a photocopy that came badly and in part incomplete given to him by the historian Friedrich Firsov, dictating it via telephone to the director of Panorama from home of the journalist Francesco Bigazzi, correspondent in Moscow for the newspaper il Giorno, as a result of which he had to resign from the position of consultant held at the publishing house Il Ponte alle Grazie, which soon suffered a collapse in sales due to the loss of credibility and was absorbed in 1993 by Edizioni Salani. The political result of the operation was partially achieved, as the attack on Togliatti, in addition to influencing the result of the 1992 Italian general election, also served to put Iotti out of the running from a possible election to the presidency of the Italian Republic.

== Electoral history ==
Election	House	Constituency	Party	Votes	Result
1946	Constituent Assembly	Italy at-large	PCI	75,146	Elected
1948	Chamber of Deputies	Rome–Viterbo–Latina–Frosinone	FDP	97,328	Elected
1953	Chamber of Deputies	Italy at-large	PCI	155,372	Elected
1958	Chamber of Deputies	Rome–Viterbo–Latina–Frosinone	PCI	166,952	Elected
1963	Chamber of Deputies	Rome–Viterbo–Latina–Frosinone	PCI	168,923	Elected

== Bibliography ==
Togliatti's Italian-language eight-volume collection of works was published by the Rome-publishing house Editori Riuniti. From 1964 to 2019, Togliatti's bibliography included 134 volumes in the most common bibliographic repertoires. Additionally, new biographies of Togliatti continues to be published.

- Palmiro Togliatti Opere Vol. I, 1917–1926. Edited by Ernesto Ragionieri. 1967.
- Palmiro Togliatti Opere Vol. II, 1926–1929. Edited by Ernesto Ragionieri.
- Palmiro Togliatti Opere Vol. III, 1, 1929–1935. Edited by Ernesto Ragionieri. 1973.
- Palmiro Togliatti Opere Vol. III, 2, 1929–1935. Edited by Ernesto Ragionieri. 1973.
- Palmiro Togliatti Opere Vol. IV, 1, 1935–1944. Edited by Franco Andreucci and Paolo Spriano. 1979.
- Palmiro Togliatti Opere Vol. IV, 2, 1935–1944. Edited by Franco Andreucci and Paolo Spriano. 1979.
- Palmiro Togliatti Opere Vol. V, 1944–1955. Edited by Luciano Gruppi. 1984. ISBN 88-359-2736-6.
- Palmiro Togliatti Opere Vol. VI, 1956–1964. Edited by Luciano Gruppi. 1984. ISBN 88-359-2778-1.

== See also ==
- Eugenio Garin
- Galvano Della Volpe
- History of the Italian Republic
- Togliatti amnesty
- Tolyatti, a Russian city named after him

== Notes ==
Party political offices
Preceded by Antonio Gramsci	Secretary of the Italian Communist Party; 1927–1964	Succeeded by Luigi Longo
Political offices
Preceded by Giuseppe Spataro	Deputy Prime Minister of Italy; 1944–1945	Succeeded by Pietro Nenni
Preceded by Umberto Tupini	Minister of Grace and Justice; 1945–1946	Succeeded by Fausto Gullo
