= Antonio Gramsci =

Italian Marxist philosopher, writer, and politician (1891–1937)

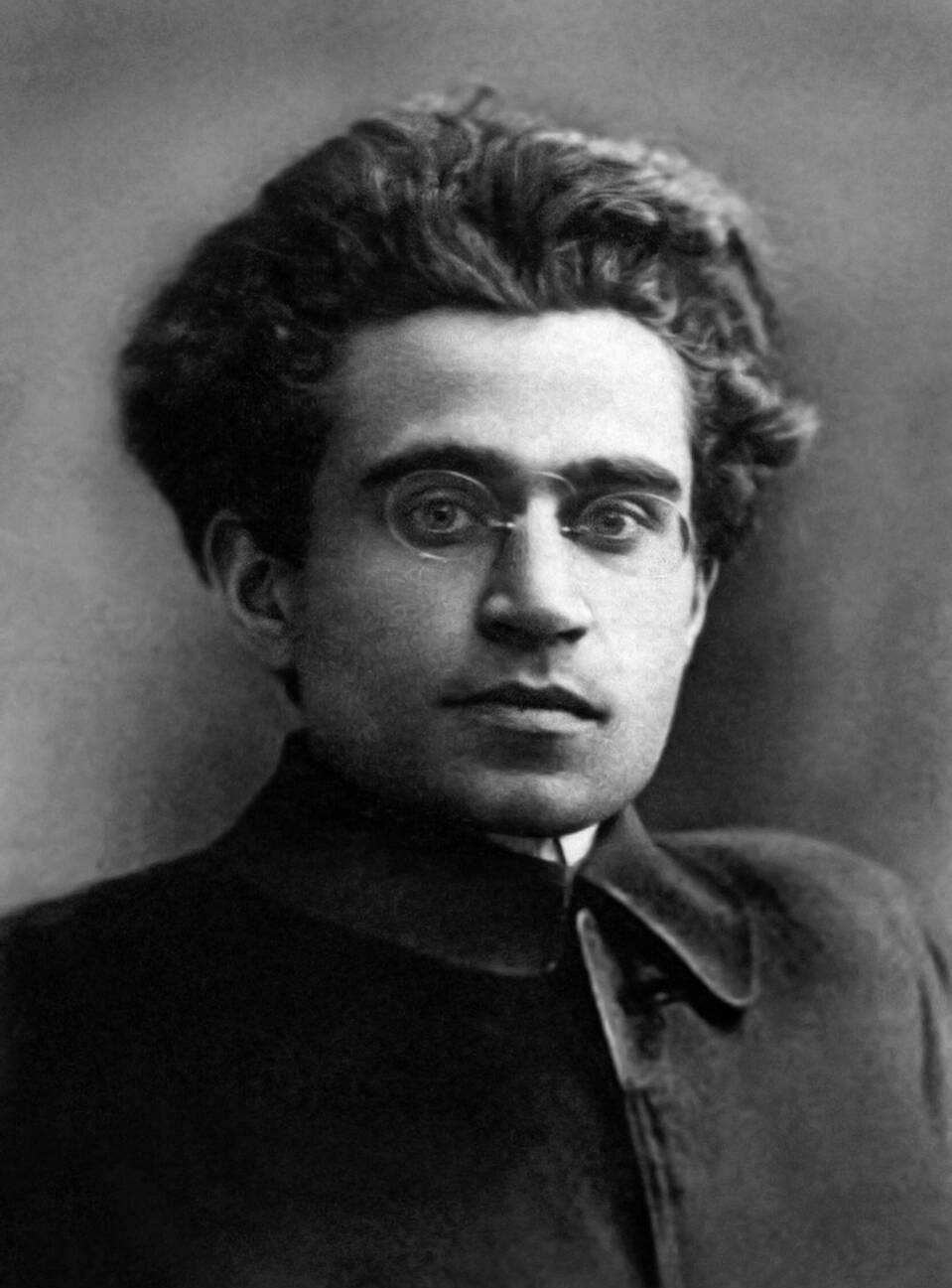
- Gramsci in 1916
- Born: Antonio Francesco Gramsci; 22 January 1891; Ales, Sardinia, Kingdom of Italy
- Died: 27 April 1937 (aged 46); Rome, Kingdom of Italy
- Resting place: Cimitero Acattolico
- Spouse: Julia Schucht (m. 1923)
- Children: 2

Education
- Education: University of Turin (withdrew)
- Academic advisors: Umberto Cosmo; Annibale Pastore

Philosophical work
- Era: 20th-century philosophy
- Region: Western philosophy
- School: Continental philosophy; Western Marxism; neo-Marxism; Marxist humanism
- Main interests: Politics; economics; ideology; culture
- Notable works: Prison Notebooks
- Notable ideas: Cultural hegemony; Americanism as Fordist; bourgeoisie as the hegemonic group; organic crisis; passive revolution; the subaltern; building a counter-hegemony to challenge capitalist power; articulation; war of position vs. war of manoeuvre; historic bloc; the distinction between traditional and organic intellectuals; State and civil society

Secretary of the Communist Party of Italy
- In office 14 August 1924 – 8 November 1926
- Preceded by: Amadeo Bordiga
- Succeeded by: Palmiro Togliatti

Member of the Chamber of Deputies
- In office 24 May 1924 – 9 November 1926
- Constituency: Venice

Personal details
- Party: PSI (1913–1921); PCd'I (1921–1937)

Antonio Francesco Gramsci (UK: /ˈɡræmʃi/ GRAM-shee, US: /ˈɡrɑːmʃi/ GRAHM-shee; Italian: [anˈtɔːnjo franˈtʃesko ˈɡramʃi]; 22 January 1891 – 27 April 1937) was an Italian Marxist philosopher, journalist and politician. He was a founding member and one-time leader of the Italian Communist Party. A vocal critic of Benito Mussolini and fascism, he was imprisoned in 1926, and remained in prison until shortly before his death in 1937.

During his imprisonment, Gramsci wrote more than 30 notebooks and 3,000 pages of history and analysis. His Prison Notebooks are considered a highly original contribution to 20th-century political theory. Gramsci drew insights from varying sources—not only other Marxists but also thinkers such as Niccolò Machiavelli, Vilfredo Pareto, Charles Darwin, Sigmund Freud, Friedrich Nietzsche, Georg Hegel, Pierre Joseph Proudhon, Georges Sorel, and Benedetto Croce. The notebooks cover a wide range of topics, including the history of Italy and Italian nationalism, the French Revolution, fascism, Taylorism and Fordism, civil society, the state, historical materialism, folklore, religion, and high and popular culture.

Gramsci is best known for his theory of cultural hegemony, which describes how the state and ruling capitalist class—the bourgeoisie—use cultural institutions to maintain wealth and power in capitalist societies. In Gramsci's view, the bourgeoisie develops a hegemonic culture using ideology rather than violence, economic force, or coercion. He also attempted to break from the economic determinism of orthodox Marxist thought, and so is sometimes described as a neo-Marxist. He held a humanistic understanding of Marxism, seeing it as a philosophy of praxis and an absolute historicism that transcends traditional materialism and traditional idealism.

== Life ==
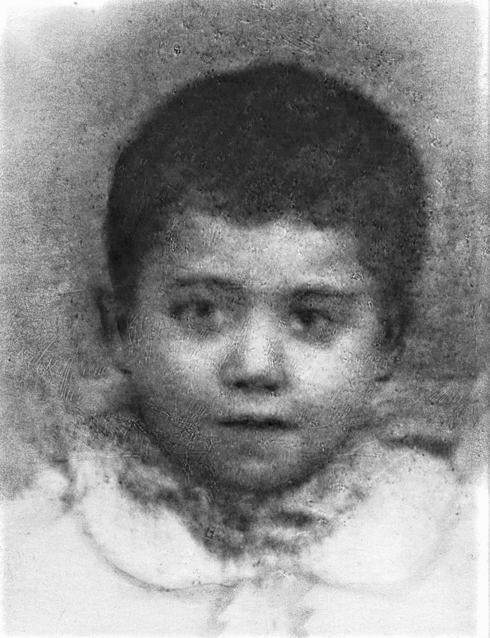
Gramsci as a child, c. 1897

=== Early life ===
Gramsci was born in Ales, in the province of Oristano, on the island of Sardinia, the fourth of seven sons of Francesco Gramsci (1860–1937) and Giuseppina Marcias (1861–1932). Francesco Gramsci was born in the small town of Gaeta, now in the province of Latina, Lazio (but historically part of the Terra di Lavoro in Campania, Southern Italy), to a well-off family from the Southern Italian regions of Campania and Calabria, and of Arbëreshë (Italo-Albanian) descent. Gramsci himself believed that his father's family had left Albania as recently as 1821. The Albanian origin of his father's family is attested in the surname Gramsci, an Italianised form of Gramshi, which stems from the definite noun of the placename Gramsh, a small town in south-central Albania.

Gramsci's mother Giuseppina belonged to a Sardinian landowning family from Sorgono, in the province of Nuoro. His father Francesco worked as a low-level official, and his financial difficulties and troubles with the police forced the family to move about through several villages in Sardinia until they finally settled in Ghilarza. In 1898, Francesco Gramsci was convicted of embezzlement and imprisoned, reducing his family to destitution. The young Gramsci had to abandon schooling and work at various casual jobs until his father's release in 1904.

As a boy, Gramsci suffered from health problems, particularly a malformation of the spine that stunted his growth, as his adult height was less than 5 feet, and left him seriously hunchbacked. For decades, it was reported that his condition had been due to a childhood accident—specifically, having been dropped by a nanny—though in 2011 it was suggested that it was due to Pott's disease, a form of tuberculosis that can cause spinal deformity of the spine. Gramsci was also plagued by various internal disorders throughout his life.

During his youth in Sardinia Antonio Gramsci cultivated a deep appreciation for literature and theater—reading works by Italian and European authors. Gramsci started secondary school in Santu Lussurgiu and completed it in Cagliari, where he lodged with his elder brother Gennaro, a former soldier whose time on the mainland had made him a militant socialist. At the time, Gramsci's sympathies did not yet lie with socialism but rather with Sardinian autonomism, as well as the grievances of impoverished Sardinian peasants and miners, whose mistreatment by the mainlanders would later deeply contribute to his intellectual growth. They perceived their neglect as a result of privileges enjoyed by the rapidly industrialising Northern Italy, and they tended to turn to a growing Sardinian nationalism, brutally repressed by troops from the Italian mainland, as a response.

=== Turin ===
In 1911, Gramsci won a scholarship to study at the University of Turin, sitting the exam at the same time as Palmiro Togliatti. At Turin, he read literature and took a keen interest in linguistics, which he studied under Matteo Bartoli. Gramsci was in Turin while it was going through industrialization, with the Fiat and Lancia factories recruiting workers from poorer regions. Trade unions became established, and the first industrial social conflicts started to emerge. Gramsci frequented socialist circles as well as associating with Sardinian emigrants on the Italian mainland. Both his earlier experiences in Sardinia and his environment on the mainland shaped his worldview. Gramsci joined the Italian Socialist Party (PSI) in late 1913, where he would later occupy a key position and observe from Turin the Russian Revolution.

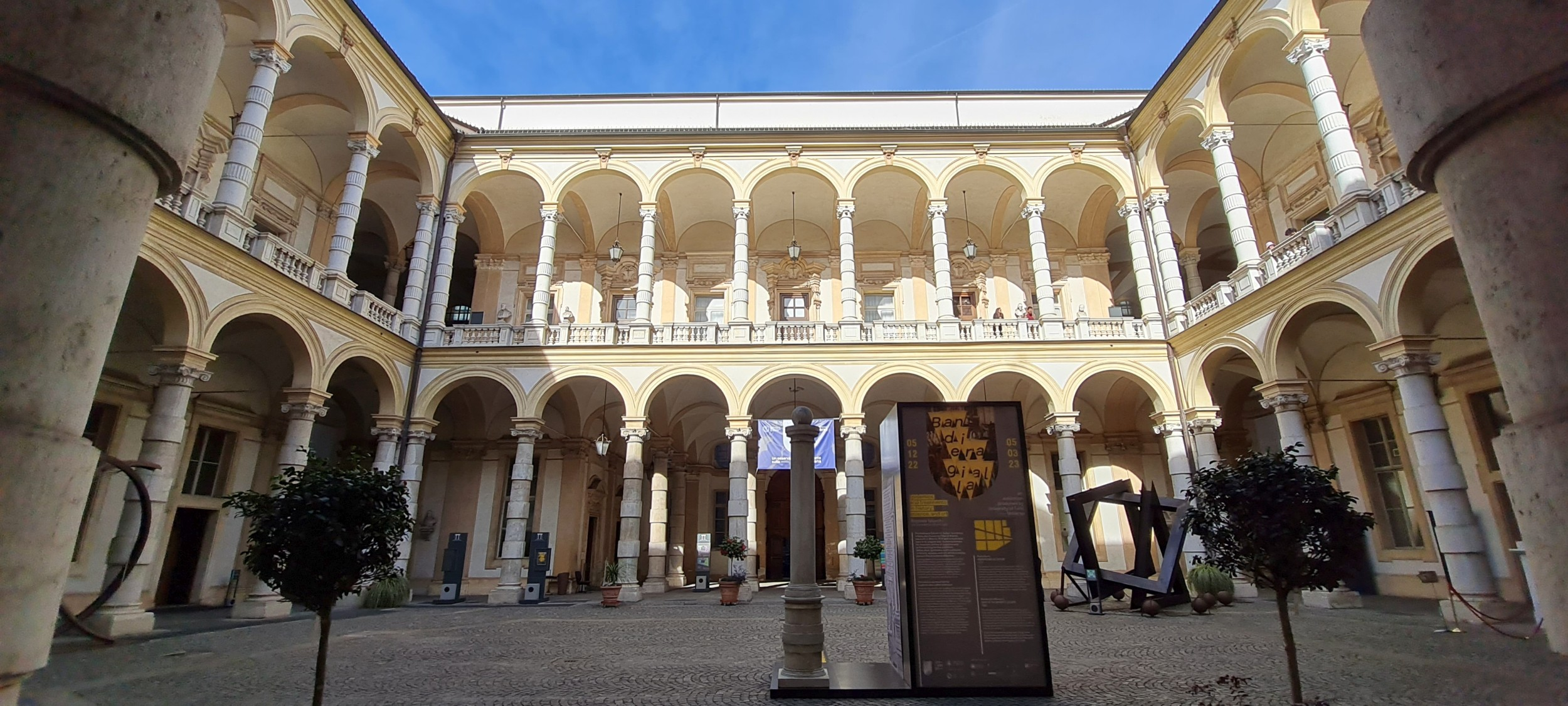
The Rectorate at the University of Turin, where Gramsci studied

Although showing a talent for his studies, Gramsci had financial problems and poor health. Together with his growing political commitment, these led to him abandoning his education in early 1915, at age 24. By this time he had acquired an extensive knowledge of history and philosophy. At university, he had come into contact with the thought of Antonio Labriola, Rodolfo Mondolfo, Giovanni Gentile, and most importantly, Benedetto Croce, possibly the most widely respected Italian intellectual of his day. Labriola especially propounded a brand of Hegelian Marxism that he labelled "philosophy of praxis". Although Gramsci later used this phrase to escape the prison censors, his relationship with this current of thought was ambiguous throughout his life.

From 1914 onward, Gramsci's writings for socialist newspapers such as Il Grido del Popolo (The Cry of the People) earned him a reputation as a notable journalist. In 1916 he became co-editor of the Piedmont edition of Avanti!, the Socialist Party official organ. An articulate and prolific writer of political theory, Gramsci proved a formidable commentator, writing on all aspects of Turin's social and political events. Gramsci was at this time also involved in the education and organisation of Turin workers; he spoke in public for the first time in 1916 and gave talks on topics such as Romain Rolland, the French Revolution, the Paris Commune, and the emancipation of women. In the wake of the arrest of Socialist Party leaders that followed the revolutionary riots in August 1917, Gramsci became one of Turin's leading socialists; he was elected to the party's provisional committee and also made editor of Il Grido del Popolo.

In April 1919, with Togliatti, Angelo Tasca and Umberto Terracini, Gramsci set up the weekly newspaper L'Ordine Nuovo (The New Order). In October of the same year, despite being divided into various hostile factions, the PSI moved by a large majority to join the Third International. Vladimir Lenin saw the L'Ordine Nuovo group as closest in orientation to the Bolsheviks, and it received his backing against the anti-parliamentary programme of a left communist, Amadeo Bordiga.

In the course of tactical debates within the party, Gramsci's group mainly stood out due to its advocacy of workers' councils, which had come into existence in Turin spontaneously during the large strikes of 1919 and 1920. For Gramsci, these councils were the proper means of enabling workers to take control of the task of organising production, and saw them as preparing "the whole class for the aims of conquest and government". Although he believed his position at this time to be in keeping with Lenin's policy of "All Power to the Soviets", his stance that these Italian councils were communist rather than just one organ of political struggle against the bourgeoisie, was attacked by Bordiga for betraying a syndicalist tendency influenced by the thought of Georges Sorel and Daniel De Leon. By the time of the defeat of the Turin workers in spring 1920, Gramsci was almost alone in his defence of the councils.

=== Communist Party of Italy ===
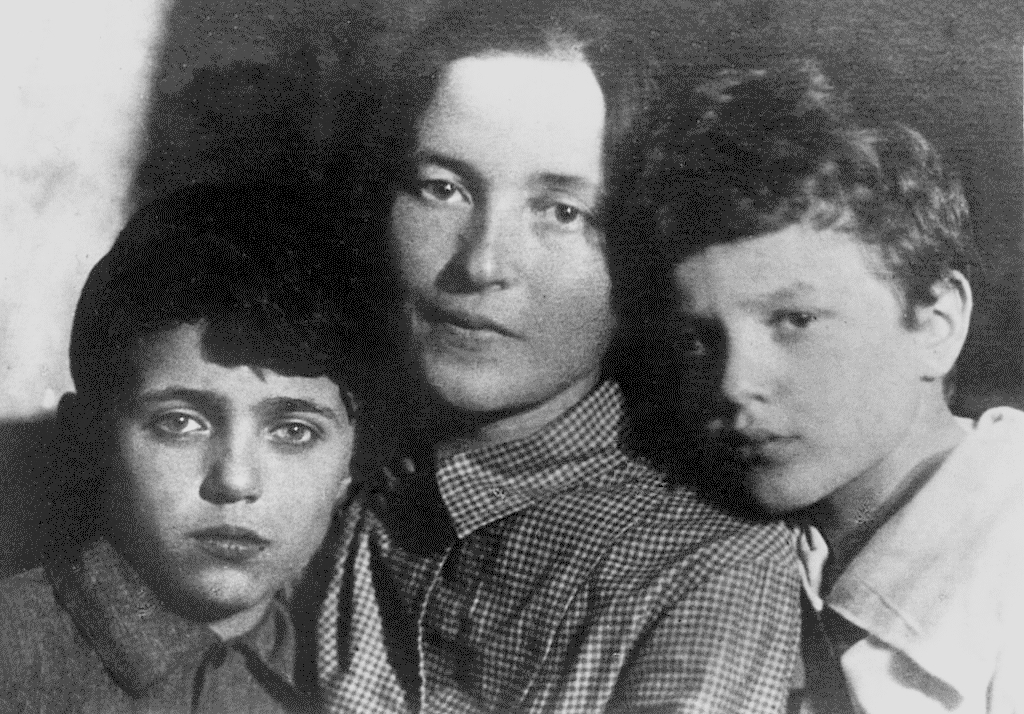
Julia Schucht with sons

The failure of the workers' councils to develop into a national movement convinced Gramsci that a Communist party in the Leninist sense was needed. The group around L'Ordine Nuovo declaimed incessantly against the PSI's centrist leadership and ultimately allied with Bordiga's far larger abstentionist faction. On 21 January 1921, in the town of Livorno (Leghorn), the Communist Party of Italy (Partito Comunista d'Italia, PCd'I) was founded. In opposition to Bordiga, Gramsci supported the Arditi del Popolo, a militant anti-fascist group which struggled against the Blackshirts. Gramsci would be a leader of the party from its inception but was subordinate to Bordiga, whose emphasis on discipline, centralism and purity of principles dominated the party's programme until the latter lost the leadership in 1924. In 1922, Gramsci travelled to Russia as a representative of the new party. Here, he met Julia Schucht (Yulia Apollonovna Schucht, 1896–1980), a young Jewish violinist whom he married in 1923 and with whom he had two sons, Delio (1924–1982) and Giuliano (1926–2007). Gramsci never saw his second son.

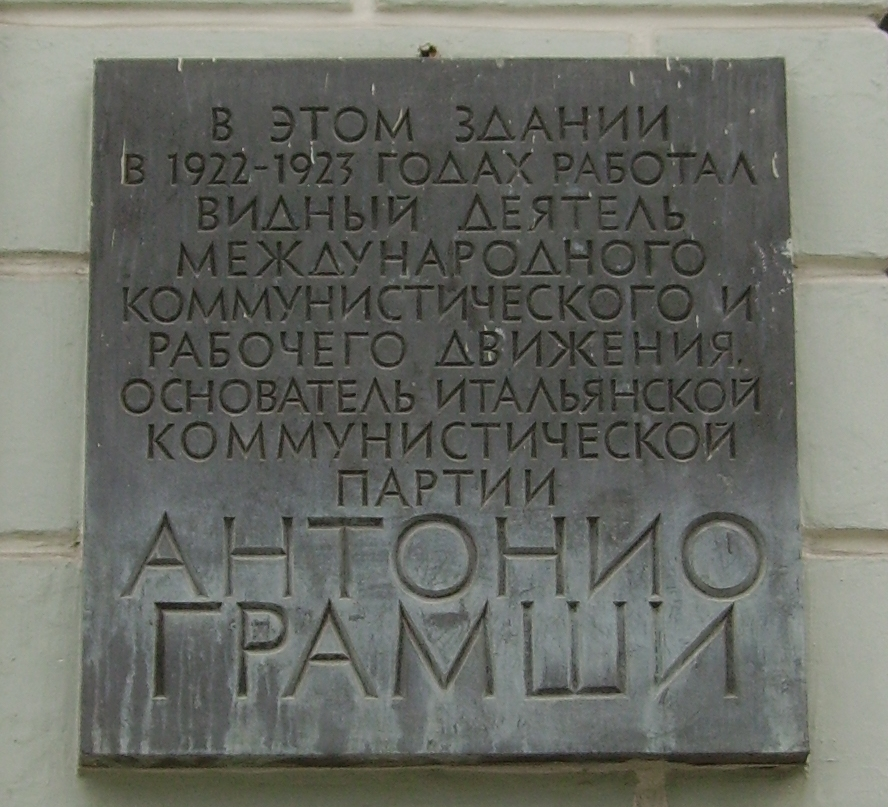
A commemorative plaque for Gramsci in Mokhovaya Street 16, Moscow. Translated, the inscription reads: "In this building in 1922–1923 worked the eminent figure of international communism and the labour movement and founder of the Italian Communist Party, Antonio Gramsci."

The Russian mission coincided with the advent of fascism in Italy, and Gramsci returned with instructions to foster, against the wishes of the PCd'I leadership, a united front of leftist parties against fascism. Such a front would ideally have had the PCd'I at its centre, through which Moscow would have controlled all the leftist forces, but others disputed this potential supremacy. Many believed that an eventual coalition led by communists would have functioned too remotely from political debate, and thus would have run the risk of isolation.

In late 1922 and early 1923, Benito Mussolini's government embarked on a campaign of repression against the opposition parties, arresting most of the PCd'I leadership, including Bordiga. At the end of 1923, Gramsci travelled from Moscow to Vienna, where he tried to revive a party torn by factional strife. In 1924, Gramsci, now recognised as head of the PCd'I, gained election as a deputy for the Veneto. He started organizing the launch of the official newspaper of the party, called L'Unità (Unity), living in Rome while his family stayed in Moscow. At its Lyon Congress in January 1926, Gramsci's theses calling for a united front to restore democracy to Italy were adopted by the party.

In 1926, Joseph Stalin's manoeuvres inside the Bolshevik party moved Gramsci to write a letter to the Comintern in which he deplored the opposition led by Leon Trotsky but also underlined some presumed faults of the leader. Togliatti, in Moscow as a representative of the party, received the letter, opened it, read it, and decided not to deliver it. This caused a difficult conflict between Gramsci and Togliatti which they never completely resolved.

=== Imprisonment and death ===
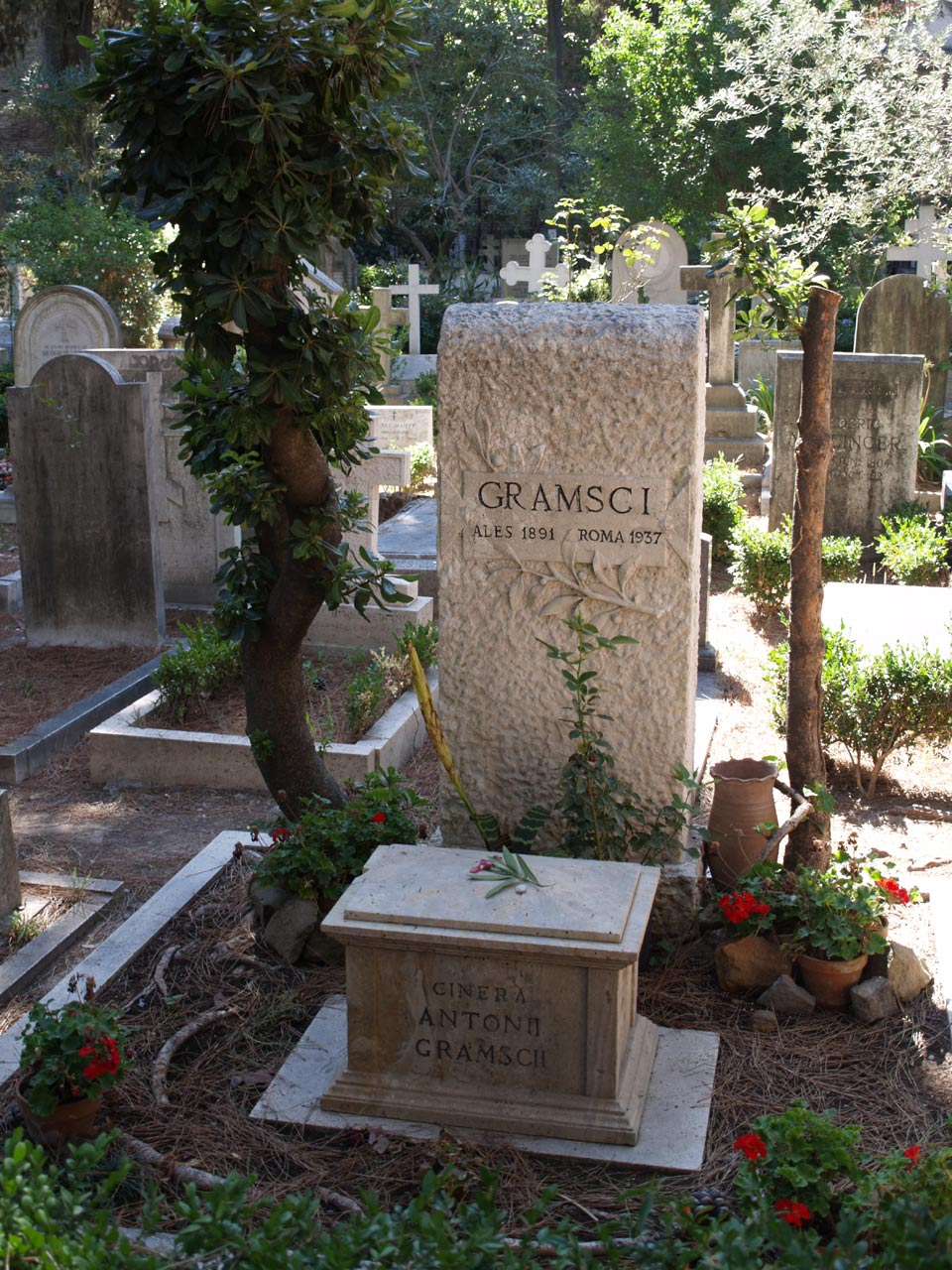
Gramsci's grave at the Cimitero Acattolico in Rome

On 9 November 1926, the Fascist government enacted a new wave of emergency laws following an alleged attempt on Mussolini's life several days earlier. The Fascist police arrested Gramsci, despite his parliamentary immunity, and brought him to the Roman prison Regina Coeli. At his trial, Gramsci's prosecutor stated: "For twenty years we must stop this brain from functioning." He received an immediate sentence of five years in confinement on the island of Ustica, and the following year he received a sentence of 20 years' imprisonment in Turi, Apulia, near Bari.

Over 11 years in prison, his health deteriorated. Over this period, "his teeth fell out, his digestive system collapsed so that he could not eat solid food ... he had convulsions when he vomited blood and suffered headaches so violent that he beat his head against the walls of his cell." An international campaign, organised by Piero Sraffa at Cambridge University and Gramsci's sister-in-law Tatiana, was mounted to demand Gramsci's release. In 1933, he was moved from the prison at Turi to a clinic at Formia; he was still being denied adequate medical attention. Two years later, he was moved to the Quisisana clinic in Rome. He was due for release on 21 April 1937 and planned to retire to Sardinia for convalescence, but a combination of arteriosclerosis, pulmonary tuberculosis, high blood pressure, angina, gout, and acute gastric disorders meant that he was too ill to move.

Gramsci died on 27 April 1937, at the age of 46. His ashes are buried in the Cimitero Acattolico in Rome. By moving Gramsci from prison to hospital when he became very ill, the Mussolini regime was attempting to avoid the accusation that it was his incarceration that caused his death. Nevertheless, his death was linked directly to prison conditions. Gramsci's grandson, Antonio Jr., speculated that Gramsci had been working with the Soviet government to facilitate a move to Moscow, but changed course as the political climate in Russia intensified in 1936.

== Philosophical work ==
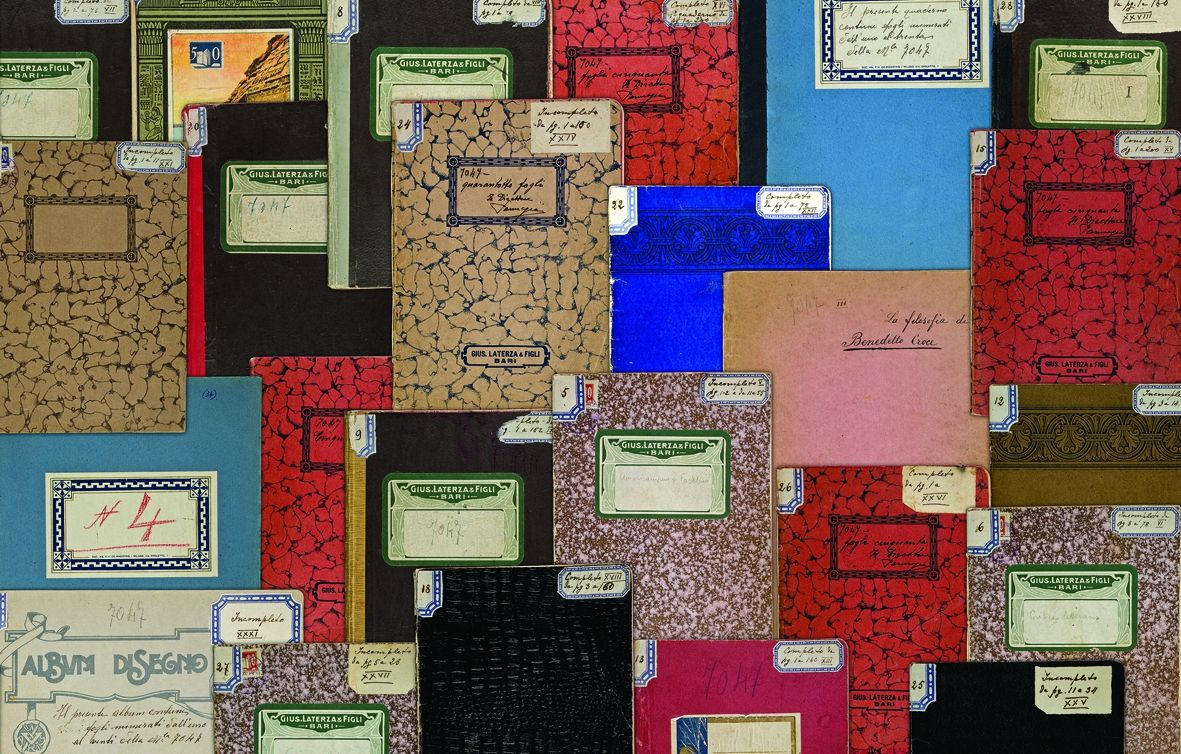
Gramsci's prison notebooks

Gramsci was one of the most influential Marxist thinkers of the 20th century, and a particularly key thinker in the development of Western Marxism. He wrote more than 30 notebooks and 3,000 pages of history and analysis during his imprisonment. These writings, known as the Prison Notebooks, contain Gramsci's tracing of Italian history and nationalism, as well as some ideas in Marxist theory, critical theory, and educational theory associated with his name, such as:

- Cultural hegemony as a means of maintaining and legitimising the capitalist state
- The need for popular workers' education to encourage the development of intellectuals from the working class
- An analysis of the modern capitalist state that distinguishes between political society, which dominates directly and coercively, and civil society, where leadership is constituted through consent
- Absolute historicism
- A critique of economic determinism that opposes fatalistic interpretations of Marxism
- A critique of philosophical materialism

=== Hegemony ===
Hegemony was a term previously used by Marxists such as Vladimir Lenin to denote the political leadership of the working class in a democratic revolution. Gramsci greatly expanded this concept, developing an acute analysis of how the ruling capitalist class—the bourgeoisie—establishes and maintains its control.

Classical Marxism had predicted that socialist revolution was inevitable in capitalist societies. By the early 20th century, no such revolution had occurred in the most advanced nations, and those revolutions of 1917–1923, such as in Germany or the Biennio Rosso in Italy, had failed. As capitalism seemed more entrenched than ever, Gramsci suggested that it maintained control not just through violence and political and economic coercion but also through ideology. The bourgeoisie developed a hegemonic culture, which propagated its own values and norms so that they became the common sense values of all. People in the working class and other classes identified their own good with the good of the bourgeoisie and helped to maintain the status quo rather than revolting.

To counter the notion that bourgeois values represented natural or normal values for society, the working class needed to develop a culture of its own. While Lenin held that culture was ancillary to political objectives, Gramsci saw it as fundamental to the attainment of power that cultural hegemony be achieved first. In Gramsci's view, a class cannot dominate in modern conditions by merely advancing its own narrow economic interests, and neither can it dominate purely through force and coercion. Rather, it must exert intellectual and moral leadership, and make alliances and compromises with a variety of forces. Gramsci calls this union of social forces a historic bloc, taking a term from Georges Sorel. This bloc forms the basis of consent to a certain social order, which produces and re-produces the hegemony of the dominant class through a nexus of institutions, social relations, and ideas.

=== Intellectuals and education ===
Gramsci gave much thought to the role of intellectuals in society. He stated that all men are intellectuals, in that all have intellectual and rational faculties, but not all men have the social function of intellectuals. He saw modern intellectuals not as talkers but as practical-minded directors and organisers who produced hegemony through ideological apparatuses such as education and the media. Furthermore, he distinguished between a traditional intelligentsia, which sees itself (in his view, wrongly) as a class apart from society, and the thinking groups that every class produces from its own ranks organically. Such "organic intellectuals" do not simply describe social life in accordance with scientific rules but instead articulate, through the language of culture, the feelings and experiences which the masses could not express for themselves. To Gramsci, it was the duty of "organic intellectuals" to speak to the obscured precepts of folk wisdom, or common sense (senso comune), of their respective political spheres. These intellectuals would represent excluded social groups of a society, or what Gramsci referred to as the subaltern.

In line with Gramsci's theories of cultural hegemony, he argued that capitalist power needed to be challenged by building a counter-hegemony. By this, he meant that, as part of the war of position, the "organic intellectuals" and others within the working-class, need to develop alternative values and an alternative ideology in contrast to bourgeois ideology. He argued that the reason this had not needed to happen in Russia was because the Russian ruling class did not have genuine cultural hegemony. So the Bolsheviks were able to carry out a war of manoeuvre (the Russian Revolution of 1917) relatively easily because ruling-class hegemony had never been fully achieved. He believed that a final war of manoeuvre was only possible, in the developed and advanced capitalist societies, when the war of position had been won by the "organic intellectuals" and the working class building a counter-hegemony.

The need to create a working-class culture and a counter-hegemony relates to Gramsci's call for a kind of education that could develop working-class intellectuals, whose task was not to introduce Marxist ideology into the consciousness of the proletariat as a set of foreign notions but to renovate the existing intellectual activity of the masses and make it natively critical of the status quo. His ideas about an education system for this purpose correspond with the notion of critical pedagogy and popular education as theorized and practised in later decades by Paulo Freire in Brazil, and have much in common with the thought of Frantz Fanon. For this reason, partisans of adult and popular education consider Gramsci's writings and ideas important to this day.

=== State and civil society ===
Gramsci's theory of hegemony is tied to his conception of the capitalist state. Gramsci does not understand the state in the narrow sense of the government. Instead, he divides it between political society (the police, the army, legal system, etc.)—the arena of political institutions and legal constitutional control—and civil society (the family, the education system, trade unions, etc.)—commonly seen as the private or non-state sphere, which mediates between the state and the economy. He stresses that the division is purely conceptual and that the two often overlap in reality.

Gramsci posits that the capitalist state rules through force plus consent: political society is the realm of force and civil society is the realm of consent. He argues that under modern capitalism the bourgeoisie can maintain its economic control by allowing certain demands made by trade unions and mass political parties within civil society to be met by the political sphere. Thus, the bourgeoisie engages in passive revolution by going beyond its immediate economic interests and allowing the forms of its hegemony to change. Gramsci posits that movements such as reformism and fascism, as well as the scientific management and assembly line methods of Frederick Winslow Taylor and Henry Ford respectively, are examples of this.

Drawing from Niccolò Machiavelli, Gramsci argues that the modern Prince—the revolutionary party—is the force that will allow the working class to develop organic intellectuals and an alternative hegemony within civil society. For Gramsci, the complex nature of modern civil society means that a war of position, carried out by revolutionaries through political agitation, the trade unions, advancement of proletarian culture, and other ways to create an opposing civil society was necessary alongside a war of manoeuvre—a direct revolution—in order to have a successful revolution without danger of a counter-revolution or degeneration.

Despite his claim that the lines between the two may be blurred, Gramsci rejects the state worship that results from equating political society with civil society, as was done by the Jacobins and fascists. He believes the proletariat's historical task is to create a regulated society, where political society is diminished and civil society is expanded. He defines the withering away of the state as the full development of civil society's ability to regulate itself.

=== Historicism ===
Like the young Marx, Gramsci was an emphatic proponent of historicism. In Gramsci's view, all meaning derives from the relation between human practical activity (or praxis) and the objective historical and social processes of which it is a part. Ideas cannot be understood outside their social and historical context, apart from their function and origin. The concepts by which we organise our knowledge of the world do not derive primarily from our relation to objects, but rather from the social relations between the users of those concepts. As a result, there is no such thing as an unchanging human nature but only historically variable social relationships. Furthermore, philosophy and science do not reflect a reality independent of man. Rather, a theory can be said to be true when, in any given historical situation, it expresses the real developmental trend of that situation.

For the majority of Marxists, truth was truth no matter when and where it was known, and scientific knowledge, which included Marxism, accumulated historically as the advance of truth in this everyday sense. In this view, Marxism (or the Marxist theory of history and economics) did not belong to the illusory realm of the superstructure because it is a science. In contrast, Gramsci believed Marxism was true in a socially pragmatic sense: by articulating the class consciousness of the proletariat, Marxism expressed the truth of its times better than any other theory. This anti-scientistic and anti-positivist stance was indebted to the influence of Benedetto Croce. At the same time, it should be underlined that Gramsci's absolute historicism broke with Croce's tendency to secure a metaphysical synthesis of historical destiny. Although Gramsci repudiates the charge, his historical account of truth has been criticised as a form of relativism.

=== Critique of economism ===
In a pre-prison article titled "The Revolution against Das Kapital", Gramsci wrote that the October Revolution in Russia had invalidated the idea that socialist revolution had to await the full development of capitalist forces of production. This reflected his view that Marxism was not a determinist philosophy. The principle of the causal primacy of the forces of production was a misconception of Marxism. Both economic changes and cultural changes are expressions of a basic historical process, and it is difficult to say which sphere has primacy over the other.

The belief from the earliest years of the workers' movement that it would inevitably triumph due to historical laws was a product of the historical circumstances of an oppressed class restricted mainly to defensive action. This fatalistic doctrine must be abandoned as a hindrance once the working class becomes able to take the initiative. Because Marxism is a philosophy of praxis, it cannot rely on unseen historical laws as the agents of social change. History is defined by human praxis and therefore includes human will. Nonetheless, willpower cannot achieve anything it likes in any given situation: when the consciousness of the working class reaches the stage of development necessary for action, it will encounter historical circumstances that cannot be arbitrarily altered. It is not predetermined by historical inevitability as to which of several possible developments will take place as a result.

His critique of economic determinism extended to that practised by the syndicalists of the Italian trade unions. He believed that many trade unionists had settled for a reformist, gradualist approach in that they had refused to struggle on the political front in addition to the economic front. For Gramsci, much as the ruling class can look beyond its own immediate economic interests to reorganise the forms of its own hegemony, so must the working class present its own interests as congruous with the universal advancement of society. While Gramsci envisioned the trade unions as one organ of a counter-hegemonic force in a capitalist society, the trade union leaders simply saw these organizations as a means to improve conditions within the existing structure. Gramsci referred to the views of these trade unionists as vulgar economism, which he equated to covert reformism and liberalism.

=== Critique of materialism ===
By virtue of his belief that human history and collective praxis determine whether any philosophical question is meaningful or not, Gramsci's views run contrary to the metaphysical materialism and copy theory of perception advanced by Friedrich Engels, and Lenin, although he does not explicitly state this. For Gramsci, Marxism does not deal with a reality that exists in and for itself, independent of humanity. The concept of an objective universe outside of human history and human praxis was analogous to belief in God. Gramsci defined objectivity in terms of a universal intersubjectivity to be established in a future communist society. Natural history was thus only meaningful in relation to human history.

In Gramsci's view philosophical materialism resulted from a lack of critical thought, and could not be said to oppose religious dogma and superstition. Despite this, Gramsci resigned himself to the existence of this arguably cruder form of Marxism. Marxism was a philosophy for the proletariat, a subaltern class, and thus could often only be expressed in the form of popular superstition and common sense. Nonetheless, it was necessary to effectively challenge the ideologies of the educated classes and to do so Marxists must present their philosophy in a more sophisticated guise and attempt to genuinely understand their opponents' views.

== Legacy ==
According to the American socialist magazine Jacobin, Gramsci "is one of the most cited Italian authors—certainly the most cited Italian Marxist ever—and one of the most celebrated Marxist philosophers of the twentieth century", adding that the Prison Notebooks "allowed his unorthodox Marxism to spread worldwide."

Gramsci's thought emanates from the organised political left but has also become an important figure in current academic discussions within cultural studies and critical theory. Political theorists from the political centre and the political right have also found insight into his concepts; for instance, his idea of hegemony has become widely cited. His influence is particularly strong in contemporary political science, such as neo-Gramscianism. His critics charge him with fostering a notion of power struggle through ideas. They find the Gramscian approach to philosophical analysis, reflected in current academic controversies, to conflict with open-ended, liberal inquiry grounded in apolitical readings of the classics of Western culture. Some critics have argued that Gramsci's attempt to reconcile Marxism with intellectualism creates an ideological elitism that can be seen as at odds with individual liberty.

His theory of hegemony has drawn criticism from those who believe that the promotion of state intervention in cultural affairs risks undermining the free exchange of ideas, which is essential for a truly open society.

As a socialist, Gramsci's legacy has been met with a mixed reception. Togliatti, who led the party (renamed in 1943 as the Italian Communist Party, PCI) after World War II and whose gradualist approach was a forerunner to Eurocommunism, stated that the PCI's practices during this period were congruent with Gramscian thought. It is speculated that he would likely have been expelled from his party if his true views had been known, particularly his growing hostility towards Joseph Stalin. While in prison, Gramsci himself argued, contrary to the position held by the PCd'I at the time, that it was unrealistic to expect a revolution to follow the collapse of fascism, and that, instead, it would have been necessary to proceed through the intermediate stage of a "Constituent phase", to be carried out together with non-communist groups (something he defined as "a punch in an eye" to those who followed Stalinist doctrines), while nonetheless considering "the creation of a military-style organization" linked to the party to be essential. Unlike Togliatti, who was more closely aligned with Stalinist positions, Gramsci refused to view the Soviet experience as a universal model (asserting instead the strategic and decision-making autonomy of each communist party within its own national context), and did not approve of the "social fascism" doctrine adopted by the Sixth Congress of the Communist International, preferring instead a tactical approach developed by the Comintern in 1921, which called for the unity of all working-class parties in the struggle against capitalism (a position that he himself had not previously supported).

One issue for Gramsci related to his speaking on topics of violence and when it might be justified or not. When the socialist Giacomo Matteotti was murdered, Gramsci did not condemn the murder. Matteotti had already called for the rule of law and had been murdered by the fascists for that stance. The murder produced a crisis for the Italian fascist regime that Gramsci could have exploited. The historian Jean-Yves Frétigné argues that Gramsci and the socialists more generally were naïve in their assessment of the fascists and as a result underestimated the brutality of which the regime was capable.

In Thailand, Piyabutr Saengkanokkul, an academic, democratic activist, and former Secretary-General of the Future Forward Party, cited Gramsci's idea as the main key to establishing a party.

== Football ==
Like fellow Turinese and communist Palmiro Togliatti, Gramsci took an interest in football, which was becoming a sport with massive following and was elected by the fascist regime in Italy as a national sport, and was said to have been a supporter of Juventus, as were other notable communist and left-wing leaders. On 16 December 1988, the PCI's newspaper l'Unità published an article on the front page titled "Gramsci Was Rooting for Juve". Signed by Giorgio Fabre, it contained some letters in which Gramsci asked Piero Sraffa for "news from our Juventus".

Even though those letters later turned out to be false, the article remains part of the Gramscian bibliography and triggered numerous reactions, including from Giampiero Boniperti, who on behalf of the club the following day told at La Stampa: "We are pleased to know that among our fans there have been personalities who have marked an era from the political, economic, and intellectual point of view. This shows that Juventus truly have something special, a charm that has never lost strength over the years." Gramsci's interest in football dates back to a 16 August 1918 article for the PSI's newspaper Avanti!, titled "Football and Scopone". Fifteen years later, he pointed at the degeneration of stadium cheering, which emerged with the advent of fascism and the consequent nationalisation of the sport that he said extinguished political and trade union commitment.

== Bibliography ==
=== Collections ===
- Pre-Prison Writings (Cambridge University Press)
- The Prison Notebooks (three volumes) (Columbia University Press)
- Selections from the Prison Notebooks (International Publishers)

=== Essays ===
- Newspapers and the Workers (1916)
- Men or machines? (1916)
- One Year of History (1918)

== See also ==
- Articulation (sociology)
- Liberation theology
- Organic crisis
- Praxis School
- Subaltern (postcolonialism)
- Subaltern Studies
- Unification of Italy

== Cited sources ==
- Althusser, Louis (1971), Lenin and Philosophy, London: Monthly Review Press, ISBN 978-1583670392, archived from the original on 18 June 2020.
- Anderson, Perry (November–December 1976). "The Antinomies of Antonio Gramsci". New Left Review. I (100) 68. New Left Review: 5–78. doi:10.64590/lrz.
- Ebner, Michael (2011). Ordinary Violence in Mussolini's Italy. Cambridge: Cambridge University Press. pp. 76, 105, 144, 150.
- Frétigné, Jean-Yves (2021). To Live is To Resist: The Life of Antonio Gramsci. Chicago: University of Chicago Press. pp. 156–159, 182–183.
- Gramsci, Antonio (1971). Selections from the Prison Notebooks. International Publishers. ISBN 0-7178-0397-X.
- Gramsci, Antonio (1971). Selections from the Prison Notebooks. International Publishers. ISBN 978-0-7178-0397-2.
- Haralambos, Michael; Holborn, Martin (2013), Sociology Themes and Perspectives (8th ed.), New York: HarperCollins, ISBN 978-0-00-749882-6
- Hoare, Quintin; Smith, Geoffrey Nowell (1971), Introduction, Selections from the Prison Notebooks, by Gramsci, Antonio, Hoare, Quintin; Smith, Geoffrey Nowell (eds.), New York: International Publishers, pp. xvii–xcvi, ISBN 0-7178-0397-X
- Jones, Steven (2006), Antonio Gramsci, Routledge Critical Thinkers, Routledge, ISBN 0-415-31947-1.
- Kiernan, V. G. (1991). "Intellectuals". In Bottomore, Tom; Harris, Laurence; Kiernan, V.G; Miliband, Ralph (eds.). The Dictionary of Marxist Thought (2nd ed.). Blackwell Publishers Ltd. p. 259. ISBN 0-631-16481-2.
- Kołakowski, Leszek (2005). Main Currents of Marxism. London: W. W. Norton & Company. ISBN 978-0-393-32943-8.
- Santangelo, Federico (2021). "Between Caesarism and Cosmopolitanism: Julius Caesar as an Historical Problem in Gramsci". In Zucchetti, Emilio; Cimino, Anna Maria (eds.). Antonio Gramsci and the Ancient World. Taylor & Francis. pp. 201–221. ISBN 978-0429510359.
- Sassoon, Anne Showstack (1991a). "Antonio Gramsci". In Bottomore, Tom; Harris, Laurence; Kiernan, V.G; Miliband, Ralph (eds.). The Dictionary of Marxist Thought (2nd ed.). Blackwell Publishers Ltd. pp. 221–223. ISBN 0-631-16481-2.
- Sassoon, Anne Showstack (1991b). "Civil Society". In Bottomore, Tom; Harris, Laurence; Kiernan, V.G; Miliband, Ralph (eds.). The Dictionary of Marxist Thought (2nd ed.). Blackwell Publishers Ltd. pp. 83–85. ISBN 0-631-16481-2.
- Sassoon, Anne Showstack (1991c). "Hegemony". In Bottomore, Tom; Harris, Laurence; Kiernan, V.G.; Miliband, Ralph (eds.). The Dictionary of Marxist Thought (2nd ed.). Blackwell Publishers Ltd. pp. 229–231. ISBN 0-631-16481-2.
- Sassoon, Anne Showstack (1991d), "Prison Notebooks", in Bottomore, Tom; Harris, Laurence; Kiernan, V.G.; Miliband, Ralph (eds.), The Dictionary of Marxist Thought (2nd ed.), Blackwell Publishers Ltd., pp. 446–447, ISBN 0-631-16481-2
