= L'Ordine Nuovo =

Italian weekly newspaper, 1919–1925

- First issue of L'Ordine Nuovo on 1 May 1919
- Editor: Antonio Gramsci and Palmiro Togliatti
- Categories: Socialist magazine
- Frequency: Weekly
- Circulation: 6,000 by the end of 1919
- Founded: 1 May 1919
- Final issue: March 1925
- Country: Italy
- Based in: Turin
- Language: Italian

L'Ordine Nuovo (Italian for "The New Order") was a weekly newspaper established on 1 May 1919, in Turin, Italy, by a group, including Antonio Gramsci, Angelo Tasca and Palmiro Togliatti, within the Italian Socialist Party. The paper was the successor of La Città futura, a broadsheet newspaper. The founders of L'Ordine Nuovo were admirers of the Russian Revolution and strongly supported the immediate creation of soviets in Italy. They believed that existing factory councils of workers could be strengthened so that they could become the basis of a communist revolution. However, Amadeo Bordiga, who would become the founder of the Communist Party of Italy, criticised the plan as syndicalism, saying that soviets should only be created after Italy had come under communist control.

Initially the newspaper, which was founded with union backing, focused on cultural politics, but in June 1919, the month following its founding, Gramsci and Togliatti pushed Tasca out and re-focused as a revolutionary voice. The newspaper reached a circulation of 6,000 by the end of the year and its reputation was heightened by its support of the April 1920 general strike, which the Socialist Party and the affiliated General Confederation of Labour did not support. On 1 January 1921, the paper began to be published on a daily basis. In January 1921, Bordiga and the supporters of L'Ordine Nuovo left the Socialist Party in order to establish the new Communist Party of Italy. The paper went defunct in 1922, to resume in March 1924 by publishing intermittently the last eight numbers until March 1925.
