= Nilde Iotti =

Italian politician (1920–1999)

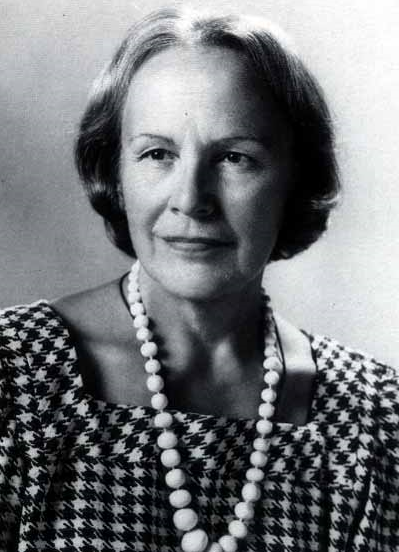
- Official portrait, c. 1979

President of the Chamber of Deputies
- In office 20 June 1979 – 22 April 1992
- Preceded by: Pietro Ingrao
- Succeeded by: Oscar Luigi Scalfaro

Member of the Chamber of Deputies
- In office 8 May 1948 – 18 November 1999
- Constituency: Parma (1948–1958); Bologna (1958–1968); Parma (1968–1994); Marche (1994–1999)

Member of the Constituent Assembly
- In office 25 June 1946 – 31 January 1948
- Constituency: Parma

Personal details
- Born: Leonilde Iotti; 10 April 1920 Reggio Emilia, Kingdom of Italy
- Died: 4 December 1999 (aged 79) Poli, Italy
- Party: PCI (1943–1991); PDS (1991–1998); DS (1998–1999)
- Domestic partner: Palmiro Togliatti (1946–1964; his death)
- Children: 1
- Education: Università Cattolica del Sacro Cuore
- Profession: Politician, teacher
- Website: Nilde Iotti Foundation

Leonilde "Nilde" Iotti (Italian pronunciation: [(leo)ˈnilde ˈjɔtti]; 10 April 1920 – 4 December 1999) was an Italian politician, member of the Italian Communist Party (PCI). Towards the end of World War Two, she fought as a partisan for the Italian resistance. She was the first and only woman member of the PCI to become the president of the Chamber of Deputies, an office she held for three consecutive legislatures from 1979 to 1992, becoming the longest-serving post-war president of the Chamber.

== Early life ==
Leonilde Iotti was born in Reggio Emilia in 1920. Her father Egidio was a railroader and a socialist trade unionist, fired by the railway company on account of his political commitment. Her father died in 1934, but, thanks to a scholarship, she attended the Catholic University of Milan, graduating in literature in 1942. Amongst her professors at the university was Amintore Fanfani, the future Christian Democratic leader and Prime Minister. On 5 October 1942, Iotti became a member of the National Fascist Party (PNF) within the Federation of Female Fascists of Reggio Emilia. Membership was required in order to become a teacher.

After Benito Mussolini's downfall in July 1943 and Pietro Badoglio's proclamation on September 8, which caused the beginning of the Italian Civil War, Iotti became interested in communist ideals and took part in the resistance movement against the Nazi German invaders during World War II.

== Political career ==
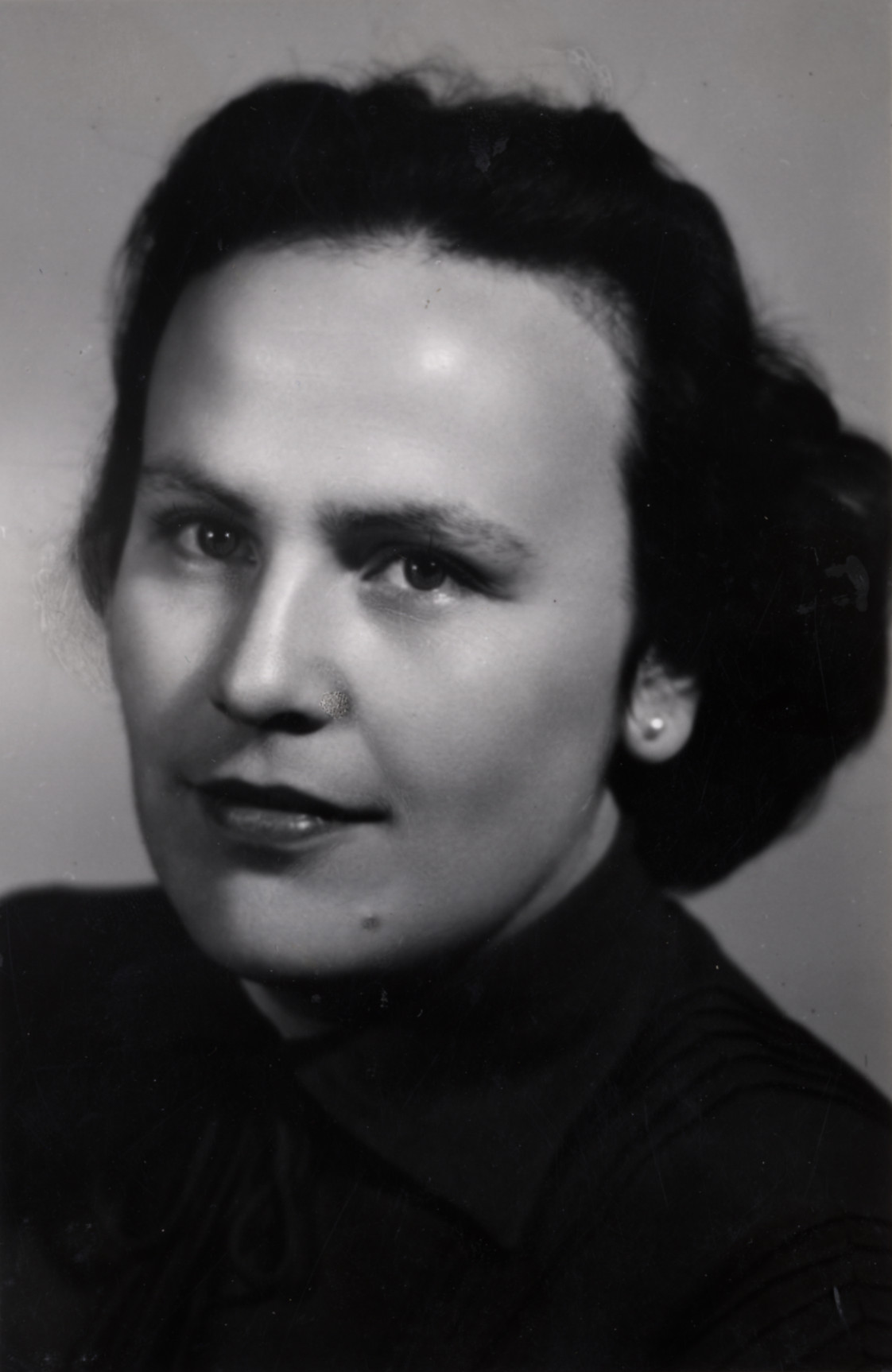
Official portrait of Iotti from 1948

After the end of the war and the referendum against the Savoy Monarchy, in 1946, Iotti was elected member of the Constituent Assembly, within the Italian Communist Party (PCI). She was also one of the 75 members of the Committee entrusted with the drafting of the Italian Republican Constitution.

In April 1948, Iotti was re-elected with the PCI to the Chamber of Deputies, of which she was a member without interruption until 1999. In 1956, she became a member of the Central Committee of the Party and in 1962 of the National Direction. Re-elected to the Chamber in 1963, she was appointed to the Constitutional Affairs Commission, focusing her activity on the relevance of the female role in the world of work and family relationships. In the following years, her main commitment became the reform of civil rights, notably the right to divorce. She was particularly involved in the campaign for the 1974 divorce referendum.

After the 1979 Italian general election, thanks to the support of PCI's historic rival, Christian Democracy (DC), Iotti became President of the Chamber of Deputies, with 443 votes out of 615. She succeeded another communist, Pietro Ingrao. Iotti focused her first speech in front of the House on women's role in society as well as the fight against terrorism.

Iotti was popular and respected as a president, and was confirmed in the office for two more legislatures. In 1987, she was entrusted by President Francesco Cossiga with a mandate of potentially forming a government. She became the first communist and the first woman to have ever received an exploratory mandate to become Prime Minister of Italy; however, Iotti was not able to form a coalition.

In 1992, Iotti's name was put forward for the election for President of the Italian Republic.

== Personal life ==
Leonilde was an atheist.

In 1946, she began her relationship with the communist leader Palmiro Togliatti, who was 27 years older than her. This lasted until his death in 1964. Their relationship, which was kept secret in the early years, became public knowledge in 1948 after an attempt on Togliatti's life a few days after the general election. Their relationship was opposed by Italy's public opinion, including many communists, because Togliatti was already married to Rita Montagnana at the time. However, Togliatti forced his wife Rita and their son Aldo, who was mentally ill, to live in Moscow, so he could continue his relationship with Iotti. Together they asked for and obtained the adoption of an orphan girl, Marisa Malagoli. Marisa was the younger sister of one of the six workers killed by Carabinieri on 9 January 1950 in Modena, during a workers' demonstration.

== Death ==
Iotti died in Rome on 4 December 1999, and is buried in the Cimitero del Verano.

== Electoral history ==
Election	House	Constituency	Party	Votes	Result
1946	Constituent Assembly	Parma–Modena–Piacenza–Reggio Emilia	PCI	15,936	Elected
1948	Chamber of Deputies	Parma–Modena–Piacenza–Reggio Emilia	PCI	51,340	Elected
1953	Chamber of Deputies	Parma–Modena–Piacenza–Reggio Emilia	PCI	33,480	Elected
1958	Chamber of Deputies	Bologna–Ferrara–Ravenna–Forlì	PCI	48,937	Elected
1963	Chamber of Deputies	Bologna–Ferrara–Ravenna–Forlì	PCI	19,969	Elected
1968	Chamber of Deputies	Parma–Modena–Piacenza–Reggio Emilia	PCI	47,406	Elected
1972	Chamber of Deputies	Parma–Modena–Piacenza–Reggio Emilia	PCI	51,203	Elected
1976	Chamber of Deputies	Parma–Modena–Piacenza–Reggio Emilia	PCI	55,282	Elected
1979	Chamber of Deputies	Parma–Modena–Piacenza–Reggio Emilia	PCI	52,949	Elected
1983	Chamber of Deputies	Parma–Modena–Piacenza–Reggio Emilia	PCI	69,632	Elected
1987	Chamber of Deputies	Parma–Modena–Piacenza–Reggio Emilia	PCI	74,273	Elected
1992	Chamber of Deputies	Parma–Modena–Piacenza–Reggio Emilia	PDS	32,077	Elected
1994	Chamber of Deputies	Marche	PDS	– (Note: Elected in a closed list proportional representation system.)	Elected
1996	Chamber of Deputies	Marche	PDS	–	Elected

Political offices
Preceded by Pietro Ingrao	President of the Italian Chamber of Deputies; 1979–1992	Succeeded by Oscar Luigi Scalfaro
