= Rita Montagnana =

Italian politician (1895–1979)

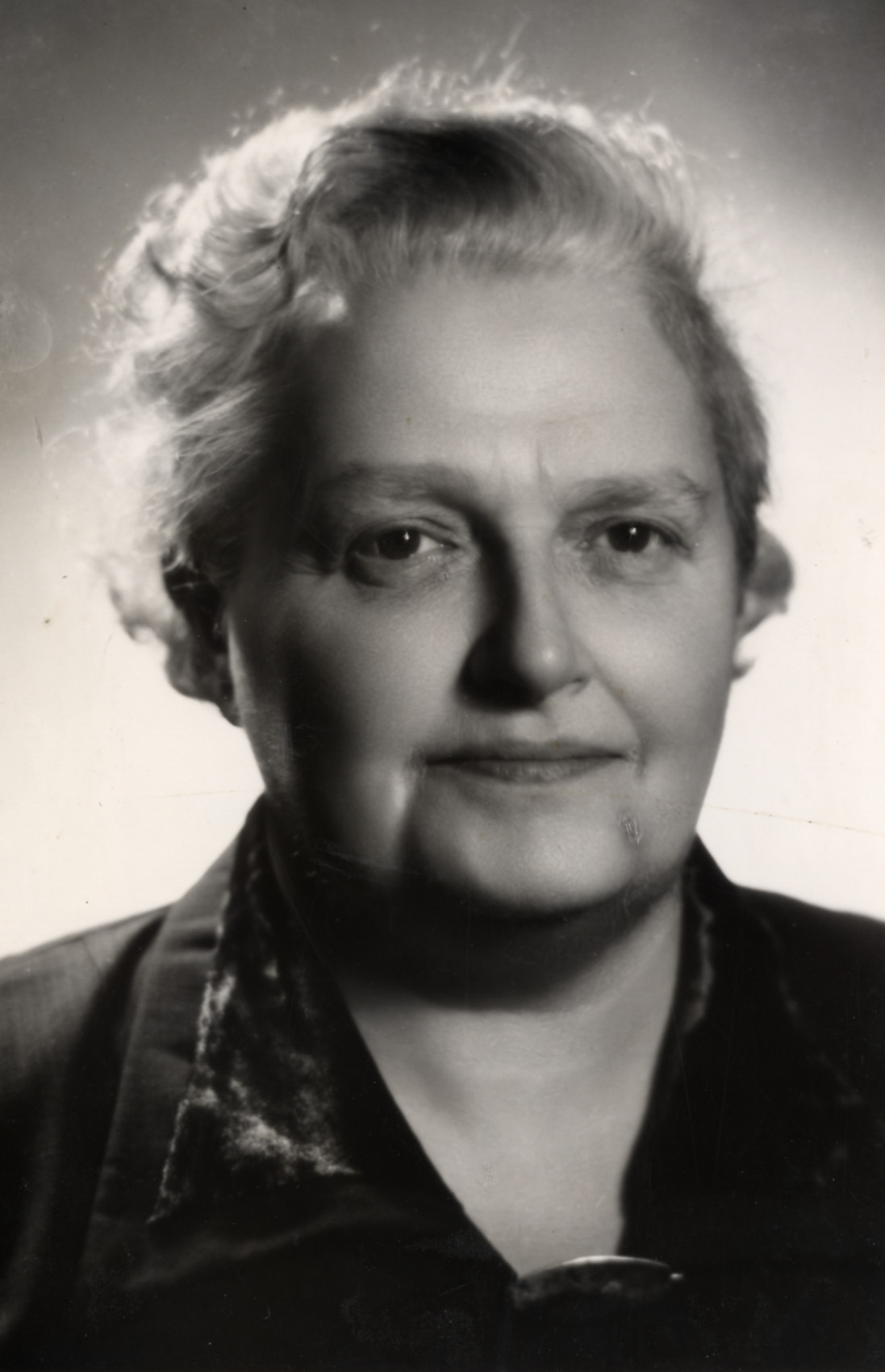
- Montagnana in 1948

Member of the Senate
- In office 1948–1953
- Constituency: Bologna

Member of the Constituent Assembly
- In office 1946–1948
- Constituency: Bologna

Personal details
- Born: 6 January 1895 Turin, Piedmont, Kingdom of Italy
- Died: 18 July 1979 (aged 84) Rome, Lazio, Italy
- Party: PSI (–1921); PCI (1921–1978)
- Spouse: Palmiro Togliatti (m. 1924; sep. 1948)
- Children: 1

Rita Montagnana (6 January 1895 – 18 July 1979) was an Italian politician of the Communist Party (PCI). She was elected to the Constituent Assembly in 1946 as one of the first group of women parliamentarians in Italy.

== Biography ==
Montagnana was born into a Jewish family in Turin in 1895, the daughter of Moise Montagnana, from Fossano, and Consolina Segre, from Saluzzo. She began working as a seamstress and joined the youth movement of the Italian Socialist Party (PSI), becoming a provincial and regional leader. In 1917 she was involved with the Revolt of Turin, and two years later participated in the occupation of factories. Alongside her younger brother Mario, she was a founding member of the Italian Communist Party in 1921. The following year she established La Compagna, the newspaper of the women's section of the Communist party. She married Palmiro Togliatti in 1924, with whom she had a son, Aldo, born in 1925. The couple left Italy, subsequently living in France, the Soviet Union, Spain and Switzerland.

She returned to Italy in 1944 and became director of the women's section of the Communist Party, as well as founding the Union of Italian Women (UDI). She was a Communist Party candidate in Bologna in the 1946 elections and was one of 21 women elected. She was subsequently elected to the Senate in the 1948 elections. Her relationship with Togliatti ended around the same time after he had been having an affair with Nilde Iotti. After losing her seat in the 1958 elections, she returned to Turin to care for her son, who had been diagnosed with autistic schizophrenia.

She died in Rome in 1979 and was buried in the Turin Park Cemetery.
