= Unione Donne in Italia =

Italian feminist association

The Unione Donne in Italia (UDI) (Union of Women in Italy) is an Italian feminist association founded in 1944 in Rome at the end of World War II. Its original name was Unione Donne Italiane (Union of Italian Women).

== History ==
In 1943, resistance groups called Gruppi di Diffesa della Donna e per l'assistenza ai combattenti della Libertà (Groups for Women's Defense and Assistance to Freedom Fighters), abbreviated as GDD, were created. These groups were an offshoot of the Italian Communist Party, but from 1944 onward, they accepted all anti-fascist women. In 1944, in the liberated zones, GDD members were integrated into the newly created association UDI (Union of Italian Women), founded by Rita Montagnana. The UDI took over the GDD's mission of fighting for women's rights, adapting it to a situation of peace and nascent democracy. Political tensions quickly led to the departure of women who were not communists. Gradually, the Communist Party's control increased, and all the leaders came from the party or the Italian Socialist Party. Membership grew significantly, from 50,000 in 1945 to 1 million in 1950, but after this peak, it declined, reducing to 220,000 in 1964. During the 1950s, the UDI followed the Communist Party line and focused less on women's rights than on the party's political decisions. Thus, it relayed pacifist messages and assisted the party during elections.

From 1945 to the 1990s the UDI's official magazine was Noi donne (literally "We women").

== Governance ==
From 1947 to 1956, Maria Maddalena Rossi was its president, succeeded by Maria Lisa Cinciari Rodano until 1960. The parliamentarian Carmen Zanti was also a member.

The UDI holds frequent national congresses.

It is affiliated with the Women's International Democratic Federation (WIDF).

== See also ==
- Unione femminile nazionale (founded 1899)
