= Thomas Bottomore =

British sociologist

Thomas Burton Bottomore
- Born: 8 April 1920; England
- Died: 9 December 1992 (aged 72); Sussex
- Occupation: sociologist

Thomas Burton Bottomore (8 April 1920, England – 9 December 1992, Sussex, England) was a British Marxist sociologist.

Bottomore was Secretary of the International Sociological Association from 1953 to 1959. He was the eighth president of ISA (1974-1978).

He was a prolific editor and translator of Marxist works, notably his collections published in 1963: Marx's Early Writings and Selected Writings in Sociology and Social Philosophy.

He was Reader in Sociology at the London School of Economics from 1952 to 1964. He was head of the Department of Political Science, Sociology and Anthropology at Simon Fraser University, Vancouver from 1965 to 1967, leaving after a dispute over academic freedom. He was Professor of Sociology at the University of Sussex from 1968 to 1985.

Bottomore edited and contributed to numerous journals of sociology and political science, and edited A Dictionary of Marxist Thought in 1983 and co-edited (with William Outhwaite) The Blackwell Dictionary of Twentieth century Social Thought published posthumously in 1993.

Bottomore was a member of the British Labour Party.

== Works ==
- Classes in Modern Society (London: Ampersand, 1955; London: George Allen & Unwin, 1965) ISBN 9780043230015
- Marx: Selected Writings in Sociology & Social Philosophy (London: Watts, 1956; Harmondsworth: Penguin, 1963) editor with Maximilien Rubel ISBN 9780140205633
- Sociology: A Guide to Problems & Literature (London: George Allen & Unwin, 1962) ISBN 9780415578936
- Early Writings of Karl Marx (London: Watts, 1963) editor and translator OCLC 35082145
- Elites and Society (London: Watts, 1964; Harmondsworth: Penguin, 1966; Harmondsworth: Penguin. 1967; New York: Penguin, 1970; London: Routledge, 1993) ISBN 9780415082716
- Critics of Society: Radical Thought in North America (London: George Allen & Unwin, 1967) ISBN 9780043230190
- Karl Marx (Oxford : Basil Blackwell, 1956) ISBN 9780631110613
- Karl Marx (Englewood Cliffs, N.J.: Prentice-Hall, 1973) editor ISBN 9780135597088
- Sociology as Social Criticism (London: Allen & Unwin, 1975) ISBN 0-04-301068-7 : £4.25, 0-04-301069-5 (Pbk) : £2.10
- Marxist Sociology (London: Macmillan, 1975) ISBN 0-333-18754-7 : £2.95, 0-333-13774-4 (pbk) : £1.25
- A History of Sociological Analysis editor with Robert Nisbet (New York: Basic Books, 1979) ISBN 0-465-03023-8 : $29.50, 0-465-03024-6 (pbk)
- Modern Interpretations of Marx (1981) editor, ISBN 0-631-18040-0
- Georg Simmel – The Philosophy of Money (1982, 2004, 2011)) translator with David Frisby ISBN 978-0-415-61011-7
- A Dictionary of Marxist Thought editor (Oxford: Blackwell, 1983) ISBN 0-631-12852-2
- Sociology and Socialism (Brighton: Wheatsheaf, 1984) ISBN 0-7108-0230-7 : £15.95, 0-7108-0235-8 (pbk) : £4.95
- Theories of Modern Capitalism (London: Allen & Unwin, 1985) ISBN 0-04-301186-1 (pbk.)
- Interpretations of Marx editor (Oxford: Blackwell, 1988) ISBN 0-631-15256-3
- The Capitalist Class: An International Study with Robert J. Brym (New York : Harvester Wheatsheaf, 1989) ISBN 0-7450-0296-X
- The Socialist Economy-Theory and Practice (New York: Harvester Wheatsheaf, 1990) ISBN 0-7450-0118-1, 0-7450-0119-X (pbk)
- Between Marginalism and Marxism: The Economic Sociology of J A Schumpeter (New York: St Martin's Press, 1992) ISBN 0-312-09105-2
- The Frankfurt School (London: Tavistock, 1984, 1995) ISBN 0-85312-458-2 (Libr. ed.), 0-85312-468-X (Stud. ed.)

Academic offices
Preceded by T.H. Marshall	President of the British Sociological Association; 1969–1971	Succeeded by Peter Worsley
