= Ruggero Grieco =

Italian politician

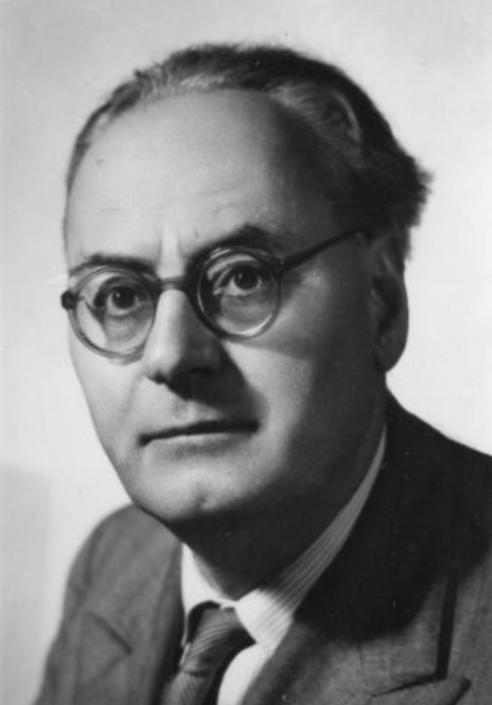
Ruggero Grieco

Ruggero Grieco (19 August 1893 – 23 July 1955) was an Italian politician, antifascist, and member of the Italian Communist Party (Italian: Partito Comunista Italiano, PCI).

== Biography ==
=== Early life ===
Born in Foggia, Apulia, Grieco completed high school studies at the institute of agronomy. Aged 18 he came into contact with socialist circles and met Amadeo Bordiga. In 1912 he joined the Socialist Party. After Italy's entry in the First World War in 1915, Grieco served as a second lieutenant in the army.

=== Political career ===
In 1921 he took part in the founding of the Italian Communist Party. From 1921 he was a member of the party's central committee and executive committee, siding with Bordiga during the Livorno schism. In 1927 he became a member first of the party's politburo and then of its leadership. From 1924 to 1926 he was a parliamentary deputy.

=== Exile ===
Between 1926 and 1944 he was in exile in Switzerland. He became a member of the Foreign Center of the Italian Communist Party under the pseudonym "Garlandi." In 1928 he became a candidate member and in 1935 a member of the Executive Committee of the Communist International. During the Second World War he worked on radio system in Moscow, where he was in charge of broadcasts for Italy.

=== Return to Italy ===
In 1944 he returned to Italy and took over the propaganda section of the Communist Party and headed the agrarian committee of the Party's central committee. He was editor of the magazine La riforma agraria (Agrarian Reform). In 1946 he was elected to the Constituent Assembly and in 1948 became a senator.

=== Death ===
He died of a heart attack at Massa Lombarda, during a political meeting to mark the launch of the National Farmworkers' Alliance (Alleanza nazionale dei contadini)

== See also ==
- Italian Communist Party
- Amadeo Bordiga
- Palmiro Togliatti
- Antonio Gramsci
- Antifascism
