= Angelo Tasca =

Italian politician, writer, and historian (1892–1960)

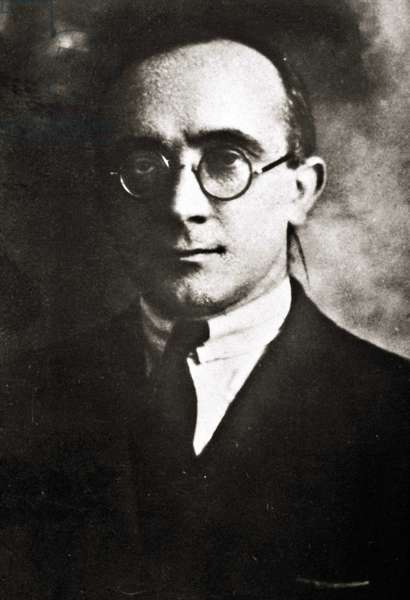
Angelo Tasca

Angelo Tasca (19 November 1892 – 3 March 1960) was an Italian politician, writer and historian. Born in Moretta, in the Piedmont region of Italy, he was a founding member of the Communist Party of Italy but was expelled in 1929 for his opposition to Stalinism and supporting the Right Opposition of Nikolai Bukharin. Having experienced persecution by the Fascist regime in Italy, he took refuge in France in 1926 and gained citizenship in 1936. After joining the French Section of the Workers' International in 1934, he worked as a writer for the newspaper Le Populaire.

Tasca joined the exiled Italian Socialist Party (PSI) and supported the POUM during the Spanish Civil War. After the signing of the Molotov–Ribbentrop Pact in August 1939 and the consequent resignation of Pietro Nenni, he became one of three joint leaders of the PSI. After the Fall of France, he aligned himself with the pro-German Vichy Government. He held an official position under Paul Marion in the Ministry of Information. He was arrested in September 1944 after the Liberation of France and was charged with collaborationism but was released only a month later after it emerged that he had secretly worked with a Belgian anti-fascist network since 1941. After the war, Tasca worked for various newspapers, was a consultant for NATO, and maintained an anti-communist/anti-Stalinist position during the Cold War. In 1960, Tasca died in Paris. His daughter, Catherine Tasca, was France's Minister of Culture from 2000 to 2002 and a senator from 2004 to 2017 for the French Socialist Party.

== Works ==
Tasca wrote in both Italian and French. There have been numerous posthumous collections of his shorter writings, published and unpublished, mainly in Italian.

- I valori politici e sindacali dei Consigli di fabbrica (Torino: Libreria editrice dell'Alleanza coop. torinese, 1920)
- I Consigli di fabbrica e la rivoluzione mondiale. Relazione letta all'assemblea della Sezione socialista torinese le sera del 13 aprile 1920 (Torino: Libreria editrice dell'Alleanza coop. torinese, 1921)
- L'unità socialista (Nancy: Imprimerie ouvrière, 1937)
- La Naissance du fascisme : l'Italie de 1918 à 1922 (Paris: Gallimard, 1938)
  - English: The Birth of Italian Fascism (London: Methuen, 1938)
  - Italian: Nascita e avvento del fascismo. L'Italia dal 1918 al 1922 (Firenze: La Nuova Italia, 1950)
- La Physiologie du Parti communiste français (Paris: Self, 1948)
  - English: A Communist Party in Action: An Account of the Organization and Operations in France (New Haven: Yale University Press, 1949)
- Deux ans d'alliance germano-soviétique : août 1939–juin 1941 (Paris: Fayard, 1949)
  - English: The Russo-German Alliance, August 1939–June 1941 (London: Chapman and Hall, 1950)
  - Italian: Due anni di alleanza germano-sovietica. Agosto 1939–giugno 1941 (Firenze: La Nuova Italia, 1951)
  - German: Zwei Jahre deutsche-sowjetisches Bündnis (Köln: Politik und Wirtschaft, 1954)
- Une page d'histoire : les communistes français pendant la drôle de guerre (Paris: Plon / Les Îles d'or, 1951)
- In Francia nella bufera (Modena: Guanda, 1951)
- La Guerre des papillons : quatre ans de politique communiste, 1940–1944 (Paris: Les Îles d'or, 1954)
- Le Pacte germano-soviétique : l'histoire et le mythe (Paris: Liberté de la Culture, 1954)
  - Italian: Il patto germano-sovietico. La storia e la leggenda (Macerata: Università di Macerata, 2009)
- Autopsie du stalinisme : avec le texte intégral du rapport Khrouchtchev (Paris: Horay, 1957)
  - Italian: Autopsia dello stalinismo (Milano: Edizioni di Comunità, 1958)
