= Edoardo Perna =

Italian politician (1918–1988)

Edoardo Romano Perna
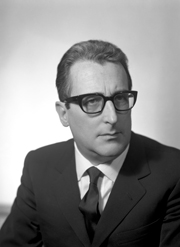

President of the Province of Rome
- In office 27 November 1954 – 28 June 1956
- Preceded by: Giuseppe Sotgiu
- Succeeded by: Giorgio Andreoli

Senator
- In office 16 May 1963 – 1 July 1987
- Constituency: Lazio

Leader of the Communist Party group in the Italian Senate
- In office 15 February 1973 – 11 March 1983

Personal details
- Party: Italian Communist Party
- Profession: lawyer

Edoardo Romano Perna (Rome, 29 December 1918 – Rome, 5 October 1988) was an Italian lawyer, partisan and politician. He was a Senator of the Republic for 6 legislatures and group leader of the Italian Communist Party (PCI) in the Senate from 15 February 1973 to 11 July 1983. He was also president of the Province of Rome from 27 November 1954 to 28 June 1956.

== Biography ==
Permanent was active in the Roman student anti-fascist movement while he was in high school. In 1942 he joined the Italian Socialist Party and then in 1943, he joined the Communist Party. Trained as a lawyer, he fought as a partisan in the Brigate Garibaldi during the Second World War, fighting as commander of the IV Zone of Rome when the capital was occupied by the Nazis. After the liberation of Rome, Perna enlisted in the combat groups and continued to fight, alongside the Allies and the partisans, against the Nazis until their defeat.

In the post-war period Perna was one of the leaders of the PCI in Rome, being elected provincial councillor of Rome from 1952 to 1963, and president of the Province itself from 27 November 1954 to 28 June 1956.

In the 1963 political elections he was a candidate for the Senate of the Republic, among the PCI lists in the Lazio constituency. He was elected senator and re-elected five times from the 1968 to 1983. During three legislatures, from 15 February 1973 to 11 July 1983, he served as leader of the PCI group in the Senate, taking the place that, for over twenty-five years, had been held by Umberto Terracini before handing it over to Gerardo Chiaromonte.

From 1972 to 1986 he was also a member of the National Directorate of the PCI and from 1986 until his death he was part of the Central Committee of the party. in the 1960s he was politically close to Giorgio Amendola and his revisionists. In the 1980s he was politically close to Giorgio Napolitano, along with Gerardo Chiaromonte, Gian Carlo Pajetta and Emanuele Macaluso. One of the leading right wingers on the Executive Committee, Perna argued that the party lacked both a general project of social change and a credible system of political alliances. Together with Napolitano, he urged the party to behave more like a 'party of government' and not just as a 'party of opposition'.

He died in Rome on the morning of 5 October 1988 in a Roman clinic. The news of his death, according to his own wishes, was made public only on 8 October, after his funeral had been held in Teolo in the province of Padua.

== See also ==
- Migliorismo
