= Capocotta =

Landform in Italy

Beach of Capocotta Spiaggia di Capocotta
- Beach
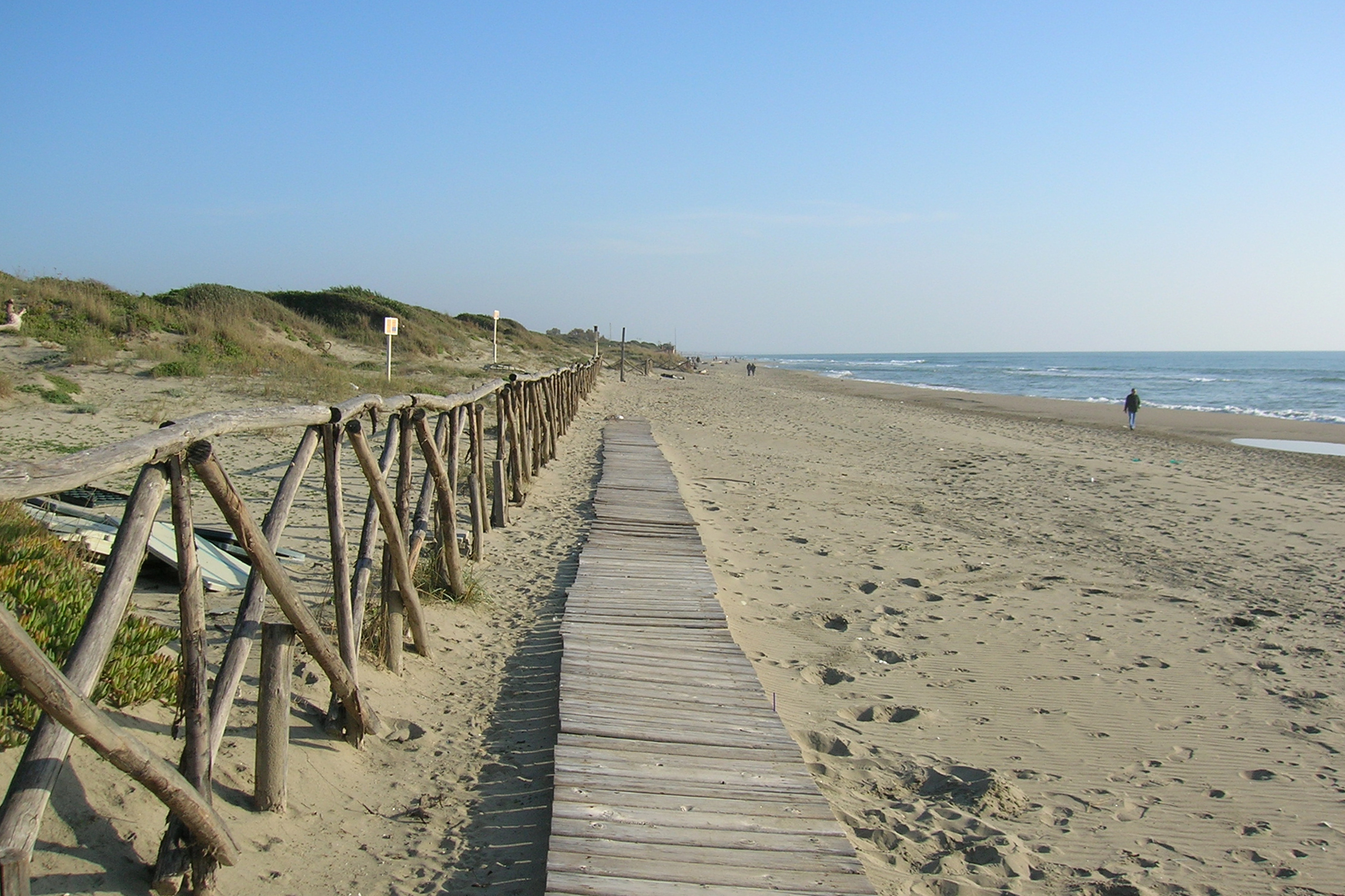
- Interactive map of Beach of Capocotta
- Coordinates: 41.66458°N 12.40297°E
- Location: Metropolitan City of Rome Capital, Lazio (Italy)
- Part of: Litorale Romano State Nature Reserve
- Offshore water bodies: Tyrrhenian Sea

Area
  - Total: 45 hectares (110 acres)

The beach of Capocotta is the area of the Roman coast between Castel Porziano (near Ostia) and Torvaianica (from km 7,600 to km 10,100 of the 601 State Highway), one of the best preserved stretches of dunes in Italy.
With an extension of 45 hectares (110 acres), since 1996 it is part of the Litorale Romano State Nature Reserve.

== History ==
The Capocotta estate, whose former name probably was Capocorso, is attested for the first time as an autonomous entity in the 15th century, when it belonged to Camillo Capranica.

It then passed to the Borghese during the 17th century; according to the 1803 Land Register, it covered a surface of about 760 hectares (1,900 acres).

At the beginning of the 20th century, it became the private property of the Royal House, which thus intended to enlarge the adjacent Castelporziano Estate, loaned to the ruling family but owned by the Italian state.

After the end of the monarchy, the estate followed the fate of the private possessions of the House of Savoy and three-quarters of it became a property of the heirs of Victor Emmanuel III.

The planned construction of a residential district in the area was averted in 1985, when, on the initiative of environmental movements and the then President Sandro Pertini, 1,000 hectares (2,500 acres) of it were annexed to the Castelporziano estate – whose use had been granted to the President of the Republic after the war, thus restoring the historical unity of the ancient territory of Laurentum.

What today is referred as the beach of Capocotta is therefore, in a narrow sense, the coastal strip of the old latifundium not included in the presidential estate; this justifies the name of former Capocotta Estate for the locality.

== Environment ==
=== Capocotta naturist oasis ===
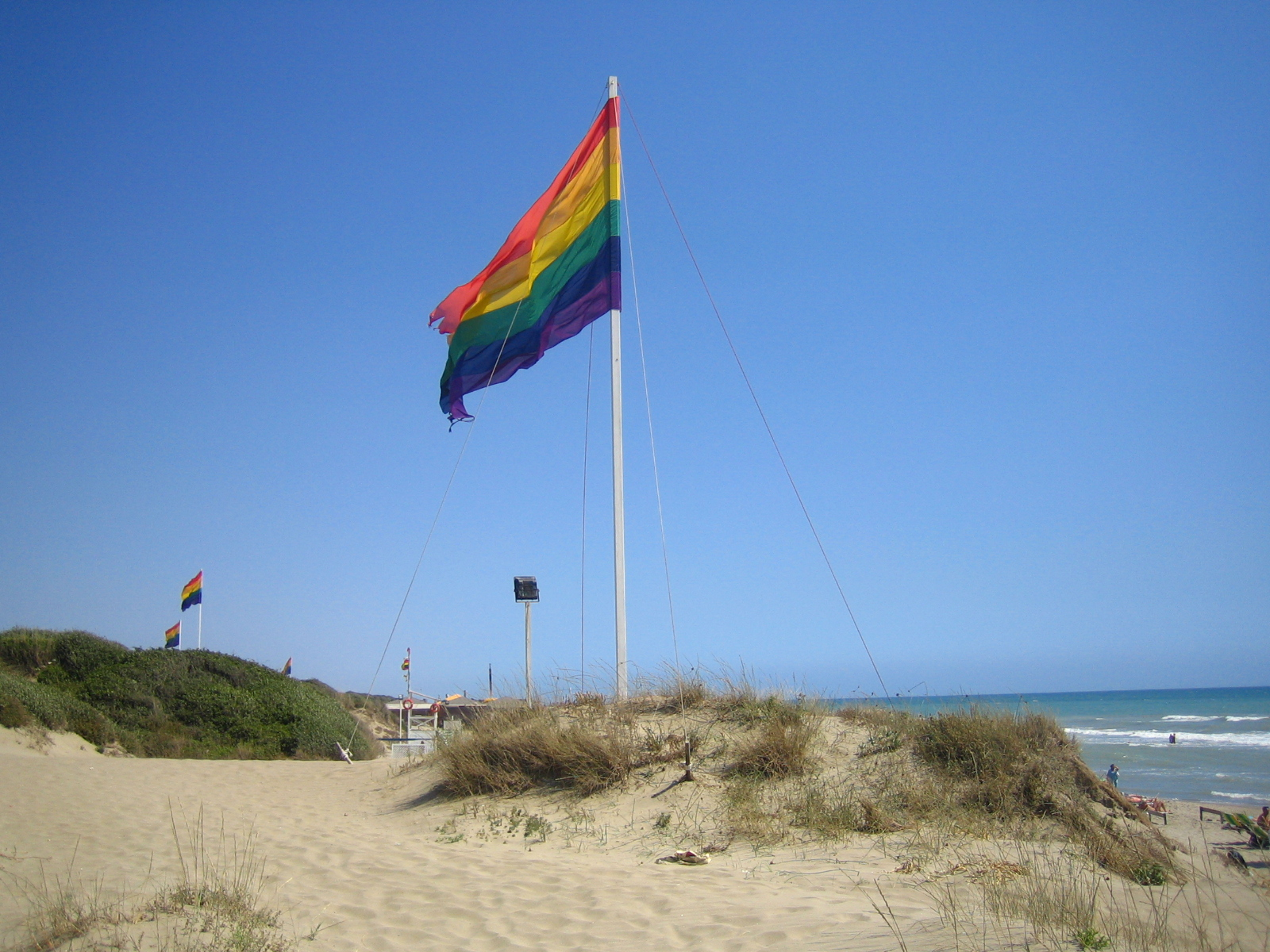
The beach of Capocotta is an LGBT tourist landmark.

The dune area of Capocotta is of considerable environmental, but also anthropological and social interest: the beach is in fact recognized by the international naturist movement and is a meeting point for the Roman LGBT community.

=== Environmental disputes ===
In recent years, the different interests that revolve around Capocotta have given rise to some controversies. The Control Commission of the Litorale Romano State Natural Reserve of the Ministry of the Environment, on the invitation of the Italian Naturists Union ("Lazio" section), sent a request for clarification to the Municipality of Rome and the State Forestry Corps on the fact that some demolitions of illegal settlements on government land, already ordered since 1999, had not been carried out yet.

The attention of environmentalists for this area of the coast is high as well: the problems deriving from anthropogenic pressure are added to those due to the erosion of the beach caused by swells, such as the ones of 2001, with 50 meters of "eaten" coastline and collapsed dunes, and 2008, following which the Lazio Region allocated 24 million euros in 2009.

== In popular culture ==
- The legend associated with Capocotta was narrated by the Romanesco poet Augusto Sindici at the end 19th century.
- The name of the beach became known to the Italian public for a very famous murder case, the Montesi case, which would have inspired Federico Fellini's film La Dolce Vita.
- With reference to the same case, the song Nuntereggae più (1978) by the singer-songwriter Rino Gaetano mentions the name of the beach.
- More recently, Alberto Arbasino makes reference to it in several passages of his novel Fratelli d'Italia.
- The hip-hop group Flaminio Maphia mentions it in the text of their reinterpretation (2010) of Vamos a la playa, a well-known song by Righeira.
- In June 2017, director Raffaele Passerini screened the world premiere of the film Il Principe di Ostia Bronx (Kiné) at the Biografilm Festival in Bologna. The film and the archive material are almost entirely shot on the beach of Capocotta.

In the 1970s, Pier Paolo Pasolini used the beach as the location of one of its "corsair" interviews.

== See also ==
- Naturism
- Litorale Romano State Nature Reserve
- Castelporziano Nature Reserve

== Bibliography ==
=== Environment ===
- Alexandra Bernitsas (curated by), Capocotta ultima spiaggia: proposta per il parco naturalistico-archeologico del litorale romano, catalog of the exhibition by the Municipality of Rome – Department of Culture and Italia Nostra – Rome, Quasar, 1985 ISBN 88-85020-62-3.
- Various authors, Stato delle dune del litorale laziale compreso fra Castel Fusano e Capocotta, edited by AIAS (Associazione Italiana amatori delle piante succulente), s.l., s.n., 2004.
- Massimo Biondi, Loris Pietrelli, Birdwatching sul litorale romano: elenco preliminare degli uccelli che frequentano il litorale da Maccarese a Capocotta (stesura aggiornata al novembre 1987), LIPU – Delegation of Ostia Lido, Municipality of Rome – XIII District, Municipality of Rome – Department of Culture, Rome, Arti grafiche San Marcello, 1987.

=== Montesi case ===
- Karen Pinkus, The Montesi Scandal: The Death of Wilma Montesi and the Birth of the Paparazzi in Fellini's Rome, University of Chicago Press, 2003.
- Francesco Floris, L'ultimo re di Capocotta, Florence, Edizioni Leonardo, 1954.

=== Literature ===
- Augusto Sindici, La Capocotta: 12. leggenda della campagna romana, in Nuova Antologia, nr. 34, file 664, August 16, 1899.
- Alberto Arbasino, Fratelli d'Italia, Adelphi, 1990. ISBN 88-06-25106-6.
