= Giuseppe Sotgiu =

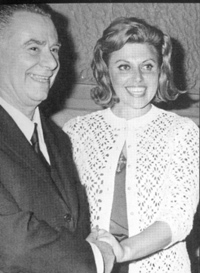
- Giuseppe Sotgiu with Claire Bebawi

Mayor of Olbia
- In office 1970–1973
- Preceded by: Tore Mibelli
- Succeeded by: Giuseppe Carzedda

President of the Province of Rome
- In office 23 June 1952 – 27 November 1954
- Preceded by: Emanuele Finocchiaro Aprile
- Succeeded by: Edoardo Perna

Personal details
- Born: 9 April 1902 Olbia, Province of Sassari, Kingdom of Italy
- Died: 18 May 1980 (aged 78) Rome, Italy

Giuseppe Sotgiu (9 April 1902 – 18 May 1980) was an Italian lawyer, jurist and politician.

== Early life and career ==
Giuseppe was the son of Antonio Sotgiu, who was the socialist mayor of Olbia between 1906 and 1910. Giuseppe was the older brother of Girolamo Sotgiu, a prominent Sardinian regional representative of the Italian Communist Party and Dante Sotgiu, mayor of Terni.

In December 1922 Giuseppe moved to Rome to attend high school, and he stayed there for the rest of his life. Also in December 1922, in Olbia, his father was beaten and forced to drink castor oil to “purge” him by fascist squads who had come specially from Civitavecchia. During the fascist period, Giuseppe dedicated himself to the legal profession and to the publication of legal texts.

In 1945 he was appointed to the National Council; he later stood unsuccessfully for election to the Constituent Assembly as a candidate on the Labour Democratic Party. In the same year, together with Mario Berlinguer, he was one of the founders of the magazine Sardegna. Between 1947 and 1950 he was President of the Legal Commission of the Automobile Club d'Italia. In 1949 Sotgiu was initiated into the Roman Masonic lodge Lira e spada, affiliated to the Grand Orient of Italy, and became a master mason in 1952.

== Early professional and political successes ==
A criminal lawyer, Giuseppe Sotgiu first hit the headlines in 1949, at the trial brought by the communist deputy it:Edoardo D'Onofrio against the authors of a pamphlet in which the plaintiff was portrayed as a torturer of Italian prisoners in the Soviet Union. Although the trial ended with the acquittal of the accused, Sotgiu’s advocacy and arguments were particularly noteworthy. He delivered a closing speech in favour of the plaintiff which lasted two entire sessions.

In 1952, Sotgiu stood in the first post-war elections for the province of Rome, on the Communist Party lists. After being elected provincial councillor on 23 June 1952, he was also elected President of the Province of Rome by the new Council. Two years later (1954), he was elected national president of the Italian Sport for All Union.

== The Montesi case ==
Giuseppe Sotgiurose rose to prominence in the so-called "Montesi case." Wilma Montesi was a tall, attractive twenty-one-year-old woman found dead on the beach between Capocotta and Torvaianica on April 11, 1953 in circumstances that have never been fully clarified. Her case immediately made headlines. Sotgiu became involved in the affair as lawyer for journalist Marco Cesarini Sforza, who, in the pages of the communist newspaper Vie Nuove, had identified Piero Piccioni, son of the then deputy secretary of the Christian Democrats, Attilio Piccioni, as one of the individuals involved. Following a complaint filed by Piccioni, Sotgiu reached an agreement with the opposing party and convinced his client to recant, in exchange for a simple fine.

Piero Piccioni was also later implicated by Silvano Muto, editor of the periodical Attualità, with much more serious and detailed accusations. Sotgiu entered the fray to defend Muto in the defamation trial brought against him in March 1954, but this time he took a much less accommodating approach; with furious speeches, a champion of morality, he invented a term that would become popular in the legal chronicles: "capocottari," to refer to those who frequented the shady circles of the Capocotta estate, where – according to his client – the Montesi crime had been committed.

While Sotgiu was thundering against vice, the Roman police headquarters was investigating another mysterious death, on March 23, 1954, of a certain "Pupa" Montorsi, an entertainer in a Roman brothel. The investigations established that among the frequenters of this brothel was Sotgiu himself, in the company of his wife. It also emerged that the lawyer's wife was in the habit of entertaining herself with a handsome underage young man, who on other occasions "performed" with Montorsi herself, while Sotgiu watched. It was a scandal within the scandal. Subsequently, the gigolo gave an interview to a popular weekly, in which he confessed to having taken part in numerous meetings of this type, accepted in exchange for a promise of work.

The couple were reported for "incitement to prostitution and aiding and abetting". Sotgiu was obliged to resign from all the offices he held, including his position as president of the province of Rome. He was also suspended by the Communist Party. Despite his acquittal two years later, to also interrupt his professional career for some years.

== The Bebawi case ==
If the Montesi case filled the newspaper columns in the 1950s, in the following decade it was the Bebawi case that occupied the Roman news.

On January 18, 1964, the body of Farouk Chourbagi was discovered in an apartment on Via Lazio in Rome, shot and then poured a bottle of vitriol over his face. After two days of investigation, Interpol arrested two Egyptians, Claire Ghobrial and Yussef Bebawi, who fled to Athens immediately after the crime. From the moment of their arrest, the couple admitted Claire and Farouk's romantic relationship and their presence in Rome on the day of the crime. However, their confessions were irreconcilable, as the couple accused each other of the crime. After they had been extradited back to Italy, the trial began.

Sotgiu was part of the defense team, replacing Giovanni Leone, who had soon resigned, and alongside Giuliano Vassalli. The two defendants continued to play a game of mutual accusations, juggling them with skill, suggestion, and dexterity, to make it impossible to establish truth or falsehood, without ever betraying themselves or experiencing moments of confusion; in doing so, they raised constant doubts in the Court about the consistency of the evidence against them.

This approach was successful: after two years of trial and about thirty hours of deliberation, the defendants were acquitted in the first instance due to insufficient evidence (a formula now removed from the criminal procedure code), the judges being unable to establish with certainty which of the two had committed the crime, or whether the two had acted in concert. Even the public present in the courtroom applauded the verdict. It is impossible to objectively determine whether the successful defense was the brainchild of the couple or their defense attorneys; however, public opinion attributed the credit almost exclusively to Giuseppe Sotgiu, who, after the acquittal, immediately appeared on the front pages of newspapers, smiling alongside the defendant, who warmly shook his hand.

It should also be noted that, two years later—Sotgiu then being absent—the Court of Appeal sentenced both defendants, in absentia, to twenty-two years each. The Olbia criminal lawyer emerged from the case with the aura of "Prince of the Bar."

== Returning to Politics: Mayor of Olbia ==
In 1970, Giuseppe Sotgiu ran in the municipal elections of his hometown, Olbia, for the Italian Socialist Party. It was another success: after several decades, the left returned to power and Sotgiu was elected mayor, just like his father sixty-four years earlier. Given the narrow majority, however, the difficulties of governing were notable. Furthermore, within the Socialist Party there was strong pressure aimed at replacing the administration with a centrist coalition with the Christian Democrats, similar to the one existing at the time at regional and national level. After just one year of work, in August 1971, the administration resigned. Subsequently, an agreement was reached with the Christian Democrats and in 1972 Sotgiu was re-elected mayor, supported by a center-left majority. The alliance, however, proved tenuous again, and the second Sotgiu administration was forced to resign in January 1973.

== The acquittal of Lorenzo Bozano ==
The 1970s brought Sotgiu another great professional success. On May 6, 1971, a rich and attractive young girl, not yet fourteen, disappeared from Genoa - Milena Sutter, daughter of a Swiss wax industrialist. Two witnesses claimed to have seen a certain Lorenzo Bozano, a wealthy young man with a criminal record, in front of the girl's private school. Others had also spotted Bozano in front of the Sutters' villa in his red convertible sports car. The young man ended up in prison, charged on the basis of witness statements and some notes interpreted as memos for a possible kidnapping found in his rented room, but without any direct evidence. Bozano was initially released by investigators, who hoped he would make an incriminating mistake after his release. Fourteen days later, the sea yielded the poor girl's body, weighed down by a lead diving belt. The autopsy determined that the girl had been killed by strangulation no later than an hour after her kidnapping. Bozano, a scuba diving enthusiast, was sent to trial.

At the trial, which took place two years later, Bozano appeared with a defence team led by Giuseppe Sotgiu, who presented a defence aimed at portraying the accused as a model prisoner and a victim of family problems and, thanks to a very effective speech, instilled pity for Bozano who, after more than twenty hours of deliberation, was acquitted due to insufficient evidence. In the appeal trial, held in May 1976, Bozano committed a decisive error: he removed Sotgiu from his defence team, and was sentenced to life imprisonment.

Sotgiu died in Rome, at the age of 78, in 1980.

== See also ==
- Death of Wilma Montesi
- The Bebawi case (in Italian)
- The murder of Milena Sutter (in Italian)
