= Girolamo Sotgiu =

Girolamo Sotgiu (La Maddalena, 22 August 1915 – Cagliari, 5 March 1996 ) was an Italian historian, trade unionist and politician. Son of Antonio Sotgiu, socialist mayor of Olbia between 1906 and 1910 and brother of the lawyer Giuseppe Sotgiu and of Dante Sotgiu, mayor of Terni, Girolamo was professor of modern history in the Faculty of Political Science at the University of Cagliari.

== Early life ==
Having lived in Rome since the age of two, he enrolled at the University, paying for his studies by giving private lessons and publishing poems and reviews. He graduated in literature in 1938. He soon became close to anti-fascist ideas and formed a group of intellectuals called the “pedantic friends”, with Antonello Trombadori, Mario Alicata, Pietro Ingrao, Antonio Amendola, Renato Guttuso, Basilio and Nino Franchina, Mario Socrate, Giuliano Briganti, Paolo Manacorda and Domenico Purificato. In 1939 he published a collection of verses, entitled Sosta al mattino.

At the end of 1939, economic needs pushed him to emigrate to Symi, in the Dodecanese, where he was reported as an anti-fascist and transferred, first to Leros and then to Rhodes, where he was briefly imprisoned. In June 1943 he was called up as an army officer and, after the armistice of Cassibile, the Germans interned him in a concentration camp and then locked him up in the prison of Calato on Rhodes. Once out of prison, he managed to get in touch with British commandos and fled to Turkey with his wife Bianca Ripepi.

Having finally returned to Rhodes after the liberation, he became part of the local National Liberation Committee and founded and directed an Italian-language newspaper, giving it a strong left-wing orientation, until the British took it under their control.

== Political career ==
After the war, he returned to Italy, joined the Italian Communist Party and the Italian General Confederation of Labour of which he was regional secretary and a member of the national committee. Secretary of the Communist Federation of Sassari, in 1949 he was elected regional councillor for the first legislature and subsequently reconfirmed for another four until 1968, when he resigned to stand for election to the Senate. He held the positions of quaestore (police commissioner) and vice-president of the Regional Council of Sardinia.

Elected senator in the 5th legislature of the Italian Parliament, on the joint list of the Communist Party and the Italian Socialist Party of Proletarian Unity.

== Academic career ==
He was professor of modern history in the faculty of political sciences at the University of Cagliari, and dean for some years. He founded and directed the magazine "Archivio sardo del movimento operaio contadino e antonomastico", a proving ground for subsequent generations of Sardinian historians. After his parliamentary experience he devoted himself mainly to the editing of a series of volumes on the modern and contemporary history of Sardinia. He is buried in the small cemetery on the island of Tavolara.

In 2015, his name and that of his wife Bianca were registered among the Righteous Among the Nations at Yad Vashem for having saved the Jewish girl Lina Kantor Amato from deportation in Rhodes in 1944 by falsifying her documents and passing her off as their daughter.
