= List of presidents of the Province of Rome =

President of the Province of Rome
- Presidente della Provincia di Roma
- Inaugural holder: Filippo Berardi
- Formation: 1889
- Final holder: Nicola Zingaretti
- Abolished: 2014
- Superseded by: Metropolitan mayor of Rome Capital

The president of the Province of Rome was the head of the provincial administration of Rome, a local government authority in Lazio, Italy.

== History ==
The office of president of the Province of Rome was established in 1889, initially within the Provincial Deputation. Before that date, the Deputation was headed by the prefect. During the Fascist period (1923–1943), the province was governed by appointed officials, including Royal Commissioners and presidents of reorganised provincial structures under central control.

After World War II, the office was restored and gradually redefined within the Italian Republic, first with indirect election by the Provincial Council and, from 1995, with direct popular election. The Province of Rome was eventually replaced in 2015 by the Metropolitan City of Rome Capital, which assumed its administrative functions.

== List ==
=== Presidents of the Provincial Deputation (1889–1923) ===
No.	Portrait	Name	Term of office		Party
No.	Portrait	Name	Start	End	Party
1		Filippo Berardi	1889	1895	?
2		Felice Borghese	1895	December 1905	?
3		Alberto Cencelli	December 1905	1913	?
4		Pietro Lante della Rovere	1914	1920	?
(3)		Alberto Cencelli	November 1920	February 1921	?
5		Pietro Baccelli	February 1921	May 1923	?

=== Presidents of the Royal Commission (1923–1930) ===
No.	Portrait	Name	Term of office		Party
No.	Portrait	Name	Start	End	Party
1		Pietro Baccelli	May 1923	December 1925	National Fascist Party
2		Giuseppe Ceccarelli	December 1925	January 1927	National Fascist Party
3		Giovanni Vaselli	January 1927	1930	National Fascist Party

=== Presidents of the Provincial Rectorate (1930–1944) ===
No.	Portrait	Name	Term of office		Party
No.	Portrait	Name	Start	End	Party
1		Piero Colonna	1930	1934	National Fascist Party
—		Gualtiero Fraschetti (acting)	March 1934	March 1936	National Fascist Party
2		Giangiacomo Borghese	March 1936	1939	National Fascist Party
3		Gualtiero Fraschetti	1939	1943	National Fascist Party
—		Giovanni Battista Angius	August 1943	June 1944	Prefectural commissioner

=== Presidents of the Provincial Deputation (1944–1951) ===
No.	Portrait	Name	Term of office		Party
No.	Portrait	Name	Start	End	Party
—		Salvatore Lo Voi	June 1944	1944	Prefectural commissioner
—		Giuseppe Porcelli	1944	September 1944	Prefectural commissioner
1		Emanuele Finocchiaro Aprile	11 September 1944	23 June 1952	Labour Democratic Party

=== Presidents of the Province (1952–2014) ===
No.	Portrait	Name	Term of office		Party
No.	Portrait	Name	Start	End	Party
1		Giuseppe Sotgiu	23 June 1952	27 November 1954	Italian Socialist Party
2		Edoardo Perna	27 November 1954	28 June 1956	Italian Communist Party
3		Giorgio Andreoli	12 July 1956	13 August 1956	?
4		Giuseppe Bruno	24 October 1956	16 December 1960	Italian Socialist Party
5		Paolo Pulci	16 December 1960	23 December 1960	Italian Democratic Socialist Party
6		Nicola Signorello	19 January 1961	9 July 1965	Christian Democracy
7		Ettore Ponti	9 July 1965	2 August 1966	Christian Democracy
8		Girolamo Mechelli	2 August 1966	1 August 1970	Christian Democracy
9		Violenzio Ziantoni	1 August 1970	9 August 1971	Christian Democracy
10		Francesco Maggi	9 August 1971	18 October 1971	Christian Democracy
11		Giorgio La Morgia	9 March 1972	12 August 1976	Christian Democracy
12		Lamberto Mancini	12 August 1976	13 October 1981	Italian Democratic Socialist Party
13		Gianroberto Lovari	13 October 1981	30 September 1985	Italian Socialist Party
14		Evaristo Ciarla	30 September 1985	4 August 1987	Italian Republican Party
15		Maria Antonietta Sartori	5 August 1987	6 August 1990	Italian Communist Party
16		Salvatore Canzoneri	7 August 1990	21 December 1992	Italian Republican Party
17		Gino Settimi	21 December 1992	31 July 1993	Democratic Party of the Left
18		Achille Ricci	31 July 1993	29 November 1994	Italian Liberal Party
19		Giorgio Fregosi	29 November 1994	7 June 1998	Democratic Party of the Left
—		Francesco Merloni (acting)	7 June 1998	17 December 1998	Democrats of the Left
20		Silvano Moffa	17 December 1998	17 June 2003	National Alliance
21		Enrico Gasbarra	17 June 2003	26 February 2008	The Daisy / Democratic Party
—		Marisa Troise Zotta	26 February 2008	30 April 2008	Prefectural commissioner
22		Nicola Zingaretti	30 April 2008	28 December 2012	Democratic Party
—		Umberto Postiglione	28 December 2012	1 October 2013	Prefectural commissioner
—		Riccardo Carpino	1 October 2013	31 December 2014	Prefectural commissioner

== See also ==
- Mayor of Rome
- Metropolitan City of Rome Capital

== Sources ==
- Del Signore, Roberto, ed. (2005). La Provincia Capitale. Storia di una istituzione e dei suoi presidenti. Rome: Provincia di Roma.
- Menichini, Piera (2005). "I presidenti delle Province dall'Unità alla Grande guerra: repertorio analitico". Storia Amministrazione Costituzione (13): 284–285.
