= Gerardo Chiaromonte =

Italian politician and journalist (1924–1993)

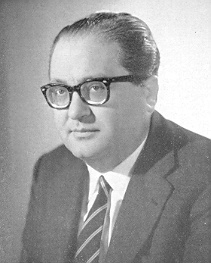

Member of the Senate of the Republic
- In office June 5, 1968 – April 7, 1993
- Constituency: Campania

Member of the Chamber of Deputies
- In office May 16, 1963 – June 4, 1968
- Constituency: Naples

Personal details
- Born: November 29, 1924 Naples, Italy
- Died: April 7, 1993 (aged 68) Vico Equense, Italy
- Party: PDS (1991–1993)
- Other political affiliations: PCI (1945–1991)

Gerardo Chiaromonte (November 29, 1924 – April 7, 1993) was an Italian communist politician, engineer, journalist, and writer.

== Biography ==
He was born in Naples on November 29, 1924, into a poor family from Roccanova, a small village in the province of Potenza. After obtaining a degree in engineering he moved to Milan in 1943 and became involved in the Italian resistance movement, a partisan force against the German occupation and remaining Italian Fascist forces of the Italian Social Republic (RSI) during World War II.

In 1943 he became a member of the Italian Communist Party (Partito Comunista Italiano, PCI). Chiaromonte's political ideas were somewhat moderate in the context of the PCI. He belonged to the wing of the party called Migliorismo, whose members notably included Giorgio Napolitano, Giorgio Amendola, Nilde Iotti and Emanuele Macaluso. The term migliorista (from migliore, Italian for "better") was coined with a slightly mocking intent. In 1991 he supported the transformation of the PCI in the Democratic Party of the Left (Partito democratico della Sinistra, PDS).

In 1963 he was elected in the Italian Chamber of Deputies and in 1968 for the Italian Senate. He remained a senator until his death in 1993, heading the Communist group in the Senate from 1983 to 1986. From 1986 to 1988 he was the director of the party's newspaper l'Unità.

In March 1988, Chiaromonte became the president of the Antimafia Commission. The Commission studied the connections between the four Mafia-type organizations and the links between the Mafia and secret Masonic lodges. It lobbied for the introduction of new legislation such as the reform of the Rognoni-La Torre law whereby asset seizure and confiscation provisions were applicable to other forms of criminal association including drug trafficking, extortion and usury among others. During his time on the Commission he would break with his party's position on Giovanni Falcone, siding with the magistrate.

He died at Vico Equense on April 7, 1993.
