= Migliorismo =

More moderate Italian Communist Party faction

Migliorismo was a tendency within the Italian Communist Party (PCI). Its founder and first leader was Giorgio Amendola, and it counted among its members the likes of Gerardo Chiaromonte, Emanuele Macaluso, and Giorgio Napolitano. Napolitano went on to become the second longest-serving and longest-lived president in the history of the Italian Republic, as well as the first president of Italy to have been a former PCI member. Due to the relatively moderate and reformist views of its adherents, it was referred to as the right wing of the PCI. Apart from Amendola, Chiaromonte, Macaluso, and Napolitano, other notable miglioristi included Nilde Iotti, Giancarlo Pajetta, and Luciano Lama. After the death of Amendola in 1980, Napolitano became its main leader.

== Overview ==
Migliorismo, roughly translated as betterism or meliorism in English, has been described as the reformist, moderate, and modernizing faction on the right wing of the PCI, which was inspired by the values of democratic socialism, looked favourably to social democracy, and was interested in revisionist Marxism. It is identified with Napolitano as one of its main leaders. Their aim was to reform and improve, hence the miglioristi name or improvers in English, capitalism by gradualist means.

Riformista (reformist in English) lays its origins in the history of the Marxist labour movement, having been described as the political-ideological movement, formed within the socialist tradition, in opposition to revolutionism. For those revolutionaries, migliorismo was a disparaging term. Pietro Ingrao coined the term, to which the philosopher Salvatore Veca then gave this definition: "It is utopian to think of different models of society, let's rather improve the one we have."

== Origins within the PCI ==
The name migliorismo, which was coined with a slightly mocking intent, derives from the Italian verb migliorare ("to improve", which is the root of the English word ameliorate) because its main goal was to improve the Italian capitalist system from the inside, by means of gradual reforms, according to a social-democratic programme rather than full-scale revolution. Its origins lay in the ideas of Amendola, a prominent PCI leader during the post-World War II period, who discussed gradually abandoning orthodox Marxism–Leninism in favour of social-democratic and reformist theories. They also looked favourably towards the Nordic model. They argued that their reformist means, rather than revolution, were the party's better path to its ultimate socialist goals.

These ideas were suited for making alliances with more moderate centre-left parties, such as the Italian Socialist Party (PSI) and the Italian Democratic Socialist Party (PSDI); both the PSI and PSDI were member parties of the Organic centre-left (the first centre-left government in the history of the Italian Republic) led by Aldo Moro and Christian Democracy (DC) in the 1960s, to which the PCI at times gave external support. Consequently, migliorismo received extensive derogatory treatment from the revolutionary left-wing of the PCI, which was led by Ingrao. The miglioristi received some modest support from the pro-Soviet wing of the party in the days when it was headed by Armando Cossutta. They were at times in contrast with the positions of the likes of Ingrao, Enrico Berlinguer, and Luigi Longo.

During the early 1980s, there were frequent conflicts between Berlinguer, the PCI secretary, and the exponents of migliorismo, who criticized Berlinguer's renunciation of the Historic Compromise with Moro and the DC and his ongoing hostility to Bettino Craxi, the then leader of the PSI. The miglioristi believed that the party had allowed Craxi to monopolize the concept of modernization in politics through craxismo, thereby leaving it unable to properly interpret the social and economic changes that had occurred in Italy. According to some critics, Craxi used the miglioristi as a tool to hamper Berlinguer. During the mid-1980s, the miglioristi were also concerned about the PCI's electoral prospects, fearing long-term declines like the French Communist Party and the Communist Party of Spain. The PCI peaked in 1976 with 34% of the vote but by 1978 and 1979, after the kidnapping and murder of Moro, a decline had begun; by 1991, the year of the PCI's dissolution, the party was reduced to 22% of the vote.

== After the PCI ==
Despite the new course taken with the Bolognina turn of 1989, when the miglioristi became for the first time the party's majority, which led to the transformation of the PCI into the Democratic Party of the Left (PDS) and a social-democratic party as the miglioristi had wanted, electoral fortunes did not improve in 1992, when the PDS was 3% of the vote ahead of the PSI, which also suffered a seatback at 13.5%. When counting the PDS, the PSI, and the Communist Refoundation Party, which was founded in 1991 by those who were opposed to the PCI's new course with the PDS, they still represented a fifth of the Italian electorate. Among the then party secretary Achille Occhetto's opponents within the PDS, which was founded in 1991 from the ashes of the PCI and still lacked a clear identity, the miglioristi strongly favoured an alliance with Craxi's PSI and a consolidation of relations with the United States and NATO. For their part, the DC and the PSI continued to fight over the Cold War; they sought to electorally undermine the PDS by linking it to its Communist past. Napolitano was one of the supporters of a Craxi-led united left and warned the PSI that their pact with the DC would have harmed them at the polls.

Several representatives of the migliorista wing of the PDS criticized Occhetto's decision to support the prosecutors investigating the numerous corruption scandals that arose during the Tangentopoli crisis, which they attacked as giustizialista (judicialist); these miglioristi critics included Chiaromonte, Napolitano, and Umberto Ranieri. Most of the PDS members charged of corrupution came from the miglioristi current. Several of the Milanese exponents of migliorismo, who were often close to the PSI, with the PSI and Craxi suffering the most as a result of the scandal and investigations by the Italian magistrates, were later arrested for corruption; most of them were released without charge, and others were acquitted.

Most former miglioristi, including Napolitano, joined the Democrats of the Left (DS), where they became associated with the positions of Piero Fassino, who blurred the Communist identity by rooting its foundations not so much in the October Revolution but in the rationality of the Age of the Enlightenment and the values of freedom and equality of the French Revolution and the Risorgimento, and Enrico Morando within the Democratic Party (PD). Some former miglioristi members, such as Macaluso, were always critical of the PD, accusing it of lacking a strong identity. In his articles from the 2000s, Macaluso always supported the anchoring of a modern secular force of the Italian left to the values of European socialism. The main criticism he addressed to the PD, which was founded in 2007 as part of a merger between the DS and the DC's left-wing successors like The Daisy, is related to the lack of socialist inspiration in the party's identity profile. In the 2010s, he was also critical of the PD's party leaders.

Upon its foundation in 1994, some ex-PCI miglioristi joined or were close to Silvio Berlusconi's party Forza Italia (FI), including Sandro Bondi, Massimo Ferlini, Lodovico Festa, and Sergio Soave. Festa is a journalist, also the author of the thriller book La provvidenza rossa about the PCI in the 1970s, who said that he voted for FI as a former PCI member. Festa rejected the migliorista label to describe himself and Giuliano Ferrara (another former PCI and PSI member who shifted rightward and became supportive of Berlusconi), with whom he only disagreed about Craxi (he was opposed, while Ferrara was supportive); he also rejected the reformist label because it was considered a heresy. He said that they called themselves "Amendolians [amendoliani, supporters of Giorgio Amendola], but a true Amendolian would have said that Amendolians didn't exist". Soave is another ex-PCI migliorista who became an editor for newspapers like Avvenire and Ferrara's Il Foglio.

== Notable members ==
- Mario Alicata
- Giorgio Amendola
- Sandro Bondi
- Gianfranco Borghini
- Paolo Bufalini
- Pasquale Cascella
- Carlo Castellano
- Gianni Cervetti
- Gerardo Chiaromonte
- Napoleone Colajanni
- Pancrazio De Pasquale
- Guido Fanti
- Massimo Ferlini
- Lodovico Festa
- Nilde Iotti
- Luciano Lama
- Girolamo Li Causi
- Emanuele Macaluso
- Enrico Morando
- Giorgio Napolitano
- Andrea Orlando
- Giancarlo Pajetta
- Edoardo Perna
- Giovanni Pellegrino
- Giovanni Pellicani
- Umberto Ranieri
- Michelangelo Russo
- Sergio Soave
- Antonello Trombadori
- Lanfranco Turci
- Rosario Villari

== See also ==
- Centrist Marxism
- History of social democracy
- Left Opposition
- Post-communism
- Revolutionary socialism
- Right Opposition
- Il Riformista, an Italian newspaper whose ideas are close to those of migliorismo and of which Macaluso was its editor-in-chief from 2011 to 2012

== Bibliography ==
- Morando, Enrico (2010). Riformisti e comunisti?: dal Pci al Pd : i "miglioristi" nella politica italiana nella politica italiana (in Italian). Rome: Donzelli Editore. ISBN 978-88-6036-482-1 – via Google Books.
- "Migliorismo nell'Enciclopedia Treccani". Treccani (in Italian). Italian Encyclopedia Institute.
