= LIPU =

Italian wildlife protection organization

- Italian League for Bird Protection
- Lega Italiana Protezione Uccelli

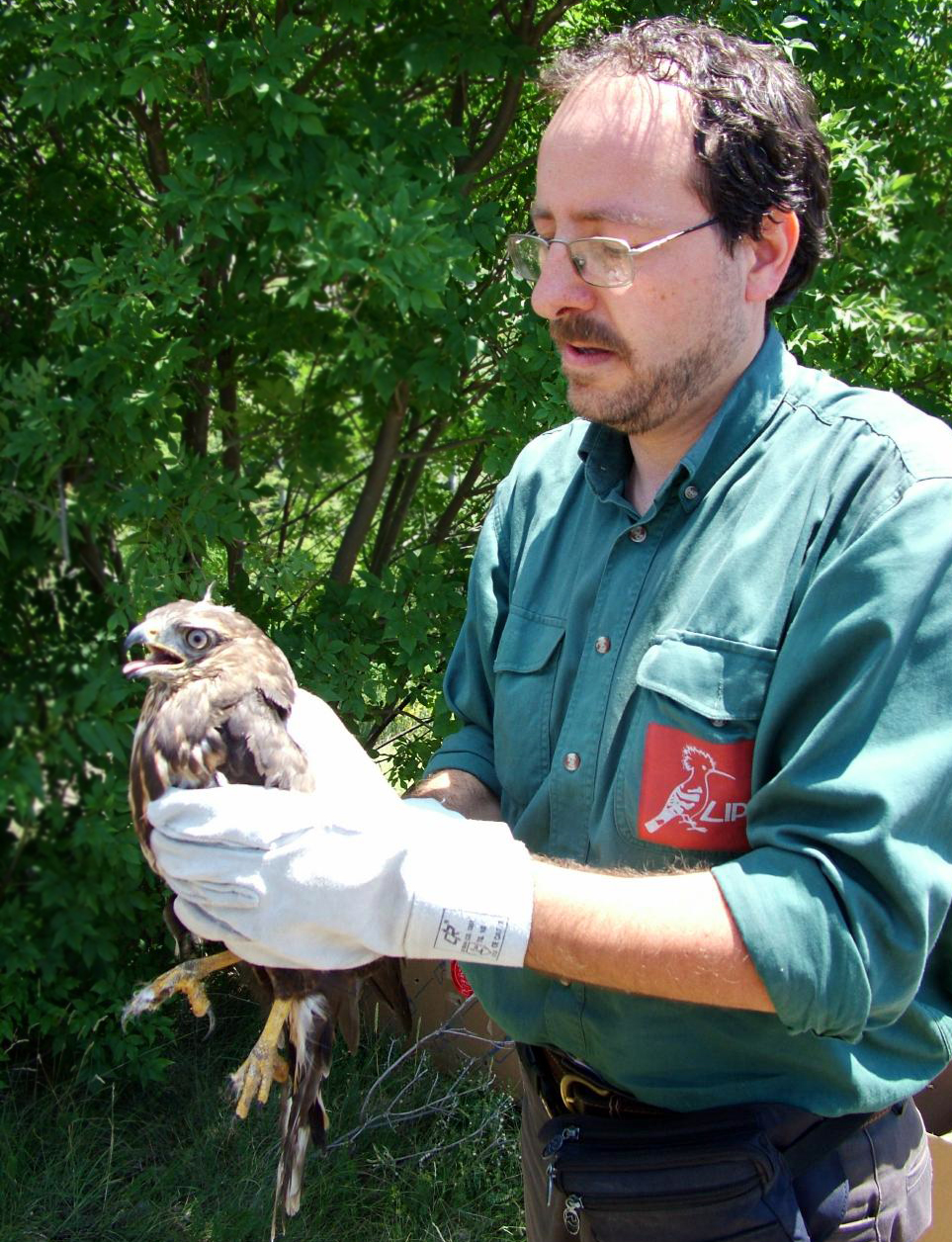
- A LIPU operator with a buzzard
- Abbreviation: LIPU
- Formation: 1965; 61 years ago
- Founder: Giorgio Punzo
- Founded at: Rome
- Type: Nonprofit
- Headquarters: Parma, Italy
- Region served: Italy
- Fields: Bird conservation, wildlife protection, environmental education
- Members: 26,511 (2024)
- Key people: Danilo Selvaggi (General manager)
- Affiliations: BirdLife International, IUCN
- Funding: Membership fees, Italy's 5×1000 tax designation, bequests and individual donations
- Staff: 77 (2024)
- Volunteers: 1,441 (2024)
- Website: www.lipu.it
- Formerly called: Lega Nazionale Contro la Distruzione degli Uccelli (Lenacdu)

LIPU, the Lega italiana protezione uccelli (En. "Italian League for Bird Protection"), is an Italian charitable organisation, founded in 1965 and devoted to the protection of the country's wildlife with a particular focus on birds. As of 2024, it has a membership of over 26,000 and is the Italian partner of BirdLife International. Moreover, it is one of the most important Italian environmentalist organizations with WWF Italia, Legambiente and Greenpeace Italia.

== Operations ==
Its activities fall broadly within four main areas:

- Species protection, including action against illegal shooting and trapping of birds.
- The conservation and development of habitats important for species conservation.
- Environmental education and the raising of public awareness over wildlife and conservation issues.
- Lobbying for changes in Italian and EU law—or for the more rigorous application of existing law—related to wildlife protection.
