= Death of Wilma Montesi =

Italian woman found dead

Wilma Montesi
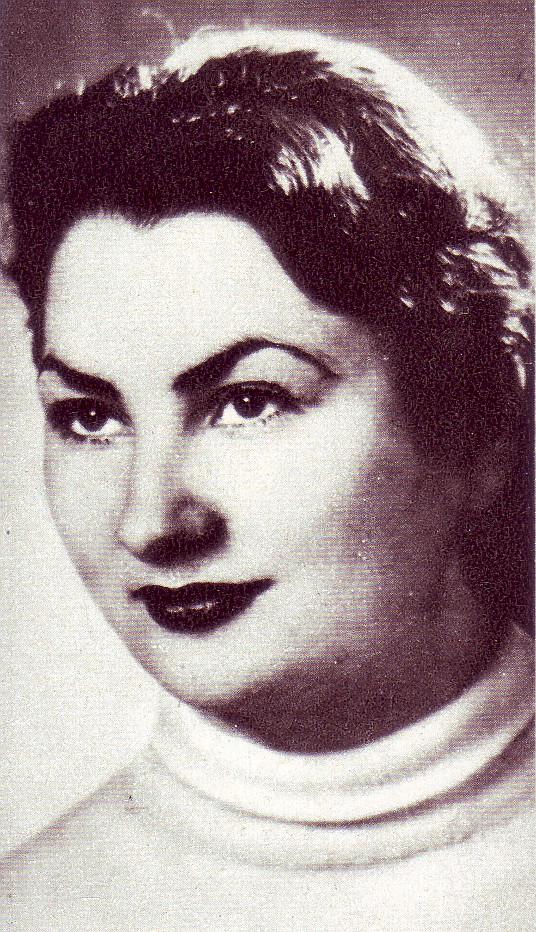
- Born: 3 February 1932; Rome, Italy
- Died: 9 April 1953 (aged 21)
- Body discovered: 11 April 1953; Torvaianica, Rome, Italy
- Known for: Victim of an unsolved murder

Wilma Montesi (3 February 1932 – 9 April 1953) was a murdered Italian woman whose body was discovered near Rome. The finding of her lifeless body on a public beach near Torvajanica, on Rome's littoral, led to prolonged investigations involving sensational allegations of drug and sex orgies in Roman society.

The alleged involvement of Ugo Montagna and Piero Piccioni (son of deputy prime minister, Attilio Piccioni and lover of actress Alida Valli) caused a scandal. Subsequently, they were absolved of all charges. The case remains unsolved, including the cause of death.

== Discovery of the body and murder investigation ==
=== The discovery ===
On Saturday, 11 April 1953, the day before Easter, the body of 21-year-old Wilma Montesi was discovered on the beach at Torvaianica, near Rome. She had been missing since 9 April.

Wilma Montesi was born in 1932 in Rome, where she lived in via Tagliamento 76. At the time of her disappearance, she was engaged to a policeman from Potenza whom she was about to marry. She was considered to be very beautiful and longed to enter the world of cinema and show business at Rome's Cinecittà film studios (she made an uncredited appearance in Prison, Ergastolo, 1952). Everyone described her as reserved and noble, intent on finishing the trousseau for her forthcoming wedding, planned for the next Christmas.

The body was found by a labourer, Fortunato Bettini, who was having breakfast at the beach. The body was lying on its back on the shore, the head immersed in water. The young woman was partially dressed and the clothes were soaked with water: she was no longer wearing her shoes, skirt, stockings, and garter belt, and her handbag was missing.

=== Initial evidence ===
When the news of the discovery was disclosed, newspapers came out with extensive articles, although the investigators had banned the press access to the mortuary where the body of the victim was kept. However, a reporter of Rome's Il Messaggero, Fabrizio Menghini, managed to gain access and to see the body. The description he provided appeared in the paper the next day and it allowed her father, Rodolfo Montesi, to show up to identify the body.

From a reconstruction of Montesi's final hours, it emerged that the young woman had not returned home for dinner on the evening of 9 April, contrary to her habits. Her mother, along with her other daughter, Wanda, had spent the afternoon at the cinema watching Renoir's The Golden Coach and stated that Wilma had declined to join them because she was not keen on films featuring Anna Magnani, adding that she would probably go out for a walk. After returning home, the two women noticed that Wilma was not there; strangely she had left home without her identification and some jewellery, gifts from her boyfriend she usually wore when she went out.

The caretaker of the building in which the Montesis lived claimed to have seen her going out at around 5:30, and not to have seen her again.

Some witnesses claimed to have seen Montesi on the train from Rome to Ostia: Ostia is around 20 km from Torvaianica, too far to travel on foot, especially by someone not familiar with the area. The owner of a kiosk selling postcards located near the beach at Ostia claimed to have spoken with a young woman apparently resembling Montesi, who had bought an illustrated postcard and intended to send it to her boyfriend in Potenza.

=== The exclusion of the suicide option and the closure of the case ===
The body was brought to the Institute of Forensic Medicine in Rome, where an autopsy was conducted: the doctors claimed that the probable cause of death was a "syncope due to a foot bath," claiming that, most likely, Montesi took the chance of the trip to the beach to eat ice cream (remains were found in her stomach) and made a foot bath in the sea to relieve a nagging irritation at the heels of which she suffered for some time. To do so, Montesi would take off her shoes and socks and, most likely, also skirt and suspenders, and then she dived into the water where she fainted and finally drowned. The coroner reconnected her sudden illness to the fact that the woman was menstruating.

The distance between Ostia (the presumed last sighting of Montesi) and the point of the discovery was justified by saying that the body had been moved by complex combinations of sea currents. An autopsy revealed that the young woman was a virgin and that she had not experienced violence (as evidenced by the fact that make-up was still on her face and nail varnish on her fingernails intact); later, however, another doctor, Professor Pellegrini, said that the presence of sand in her intimate parts could be explained only as a consequence of violence. No traces of drugs or alcohol were found in her body.

== The scandal ==
=== The press involvement ===
The accident theory was considered reliable by the police, who closed the case. However, newspapers were sceptical.

On 4 May, the Naples monarchist newspaper Roma, suggested the hypothesis of a plot to cover up the real killers, probably some powerful personalities from politics; the hypothesis was presented in the article "Why are the police silent on the death of Wilma Montesi?", by journalist Riccardo Giannini, who had a large following.

This hypothesis was shared by prestigious national newspapers such as Corriere della Sera and Paese Sera, and by small gossip magazines such as Attualità, but the main actor was the Messaggero reporter Fabrizio Menghini, who had followed the case from the outset. The idea, however, was echoed by almost all local and national newspapers.

On 24 May 1953, an article by Marco Cesarini Sforza, published in the communist magazine Vie Nuove, had much resonance: one of the characters appearing in the investigation and allegedly linked to politics, so far known as "the blond", was identified as Piero Piccioni. Piccioni was a film score composer, the lover of Alida Valli and the son of Attilio Piccioni, Deputy Prime Minister, Foreign Minister and a major exponent of the Christian Democrats.

The name of "blond" had been attributed to the young Piccioni by Paese Sera: an article published on 5 May told how the young man had brought to the police station the missing garments of the murdered girl. Identification with Piero Piccioni was a fact known to all journalists, but no one had ever revealed the identity to the general public. In early May, Il merlo giallo published a cartoon satire in which a garter belt, held in the beak of a pigeon ("Piccione" in Italian), was brought to the police station, a clear reference to the politician and crime. The news caused uproar because it was published shortly before the 1953 general election.

=== Piero Piccioni and political scandal ===
Piero Piccioni sued the journalist and the editor of Vie Nuove, Fidia Gambetti for defamation. Sforza was subjected to a harsh interrogation. The Italian Communist Party (PCI), the owner of the newspaper and sole "political" beneficiary of the scandal, refused to recognize the work of the journalist, who was accused of "sensationalism" and threatened with dismissal.

Even under interrogation, Cesarini Sforza never directly quoted the name of the source from which officially the news came, saying only that it came from "the faithful environments of De Gasperi."

Even the journalist's father, a professor of philosophy at Sapienza University of Rome, suggested to his son to recant, as well as the lawyer Francesco Carnelutti, who had taken the side of the plaintiff on behalf of Piccioni.

The lawyer of Marco Cesarini Sforza, Giuseppe Sotgiu (former president of the provincial administration of Rome and member of the PCI) made an agreement with his colleague, and on May 31 Cesarini Sforza recanted his statements. He poured 50,000 Lire to charity to "House of fraternal friendship for freed from prison," and in exchange, Piccioni dropped the charge.

Although, for the moment, the scandal for the Christian Democrats was excluded, the Piccioni name had been mentioned and later would return to prominence.

Meanwhile, during the summer, the case disappeared from the news pages.

== In film ==
At the end of the 1960 Federico Fellini's film La dolce vita, fishermen retrieve a dead ray-like monster from the sea. It is an allusion to the Montesi affair.

The 1972 film Pulp and the 2023 film Finally Dawn took inspiration by the Montesi affair.

== See also ==
- List of solved missing person cases: 1950–1999
- List of unsolved murders (1900–1979)
