= Emanuele Macaluso =

Italian trade unionist, politician, and journalist (1924–2021)

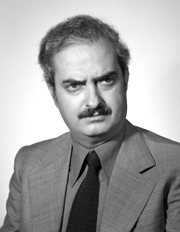

Member of the Senate of the Republic
- In office 4 July 1976 – 22 April 1992

Member of the Chamber of Deputies
- In office 16 May 1963 – 4 July 1976

Personal details
- Born: 21 March 1924 Caltanissetta, Kingdom of Italy
- Died: 19 January 2021 (aged 96) Rome, Italy
- Party: PCdI (1941–1943); PCI (1943–1991); PDS (1991–1998); DS (1998–2007)
- Occupation: Trade unionist, politician

Emanuele Macaluso (21 March 1924 – 19 January 2021) was an Italian trade unionist, politician, and journalist.

== Biography ==
In 1941, Macaluso joined the clandestine Communist Party of Italy (PCdI), which became known as the Italian Communist Party (PCI) in 1943, and took part in the Sicilian trade union movement. From 1947 to 1956, he was regional secretary of the Italian General Confederation of Labour.

In 1958, once elected to the Sicilian Regional Assembly, Macaluso was one of the creators of milazzismo, named after Silvio Milazzo, elected president of Sicily, which led to the birth of a regional government supported by the PCI, the Italian Socialist Party, the National Monarchist Party, and the Italian Social Movement. Macaluso's work was applauded by Palmiro Togliatti himself.

In the party, Macaluso was a member of the wing called migliorismo, together with the future Italian president Giorgio Napolitano. In 1963, he was elected to the Chamber of Deputies, holding the seat until 1976, when he was elected to the Senate of the Republic; he left the Italian Parliament in 1992. In those years, he was a member of the PCI's political secretariat under Togliatti, Luigi Longo, and Enrico Berlinguer.

From 1982 to 1986, Macaluso was editor-in-chief of L'Unità. Macaluso was always critical of the centre-left Democratic Party (PD), which was formed in 2007 as part of a merger between the PCI's legal successor parties (Democratic Party of the Left and Democrats of the Left, PDS and DS, respectively) and Christian Democracy's left-wing successors like The Daisy, accusing it of lacking a strong identity. In his articles from the 2000s, Macaluso always supported the anchoring of a modern secular force of the Italian left to the values of European socialism. The main criticism he addressed to the PD, is related to the lack of socialist inspiration in the party's identity profile. In the 2010s, he was also critical of the PD's party leaders. He died on 19 January 2021 at the age of 96.
