= Berlinguer =

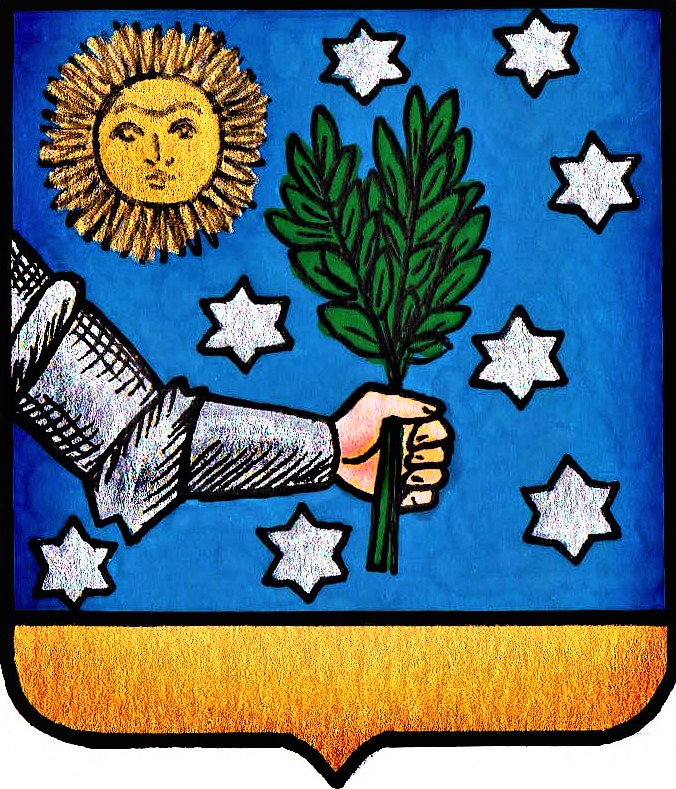
- Coat of arms of Berlinguer family
- Pronunciation: Italian: [berliŋˈɡwɛr] Catalan: [bəɾliŋˈɡe], Algherese: [baɾliŋˈɡe]
- Languages: Italian, Catalan (Algherese), French

Origin
- Languages: Frankish, Lombardic
- Meaning: *beran + *gaira, 'bear with a spear'
- Region of origin: Catalonia

Other names
- Variant forms: Beringhieri, Beringheri, Beringheli, Beringeli, Beringari, Beringario, Belinghieri, Belingheri, Bellinghieri, Bellingheri, Belingeri, Belingerio, Bellingieri, Berlinghieri, Berlingheri
- Related names: Bérangier, Béranger, Bérenger, Bérenguier, Beringuel, Berengar

Berlinguer is a surname originating in Catalan language (while the name itself has Frankish and Lombardic origins) but found mainly in Italy, especially in Sardinia and in Sassarese territory. Notable people with the name include:

- Bianca Berlinguer (born 1959), Italian journalist, daughter of Enrico
- Enrico Berlinguer (1922–1984), Italian politician, son of Mario and brother of Giovanni
- Giovanni Berlinguer (1924–2015), Italian politician, son of Mario and brother of Enrico
- Giuliana Berlinguer (1933–2014), Italian film director, wife of Giovanni
- Luigi Berlinguer (1932–2023), Italian politician, brother of Sergio and cousin of Enrico and Giovanni
- Mario Berlinguer (1891–1969), Italian lawyer and politician, father of Enrico and Giovanni
- Sergio Berlinguer (1934–2021), Italian diplomat, brother of Luigi and cousin of Enrico and Giovanni
