= Berlinghieri =

Berlinghieri is an Italian surname. Notable people with the surname include:

- Barone Berlinghieri, Italian painter, Berlinghiero's son
- Berlinghiero also known as Berlinghiero Berlinghieri, Italian painter of the early thirteenth century
- Bonaventura Berlinghieri, Italian painter, Berlinghiero's son
- Camillo Berlinghieri (died 1635), Baroque painter
- Francesco Berlinghieri (1440–1501), Italian humanist
- Marco Berlinghieri, Italian painter, Berlinghiero's son
