= Enrico Berlinguer =

Italian communist politician (1922–1984)

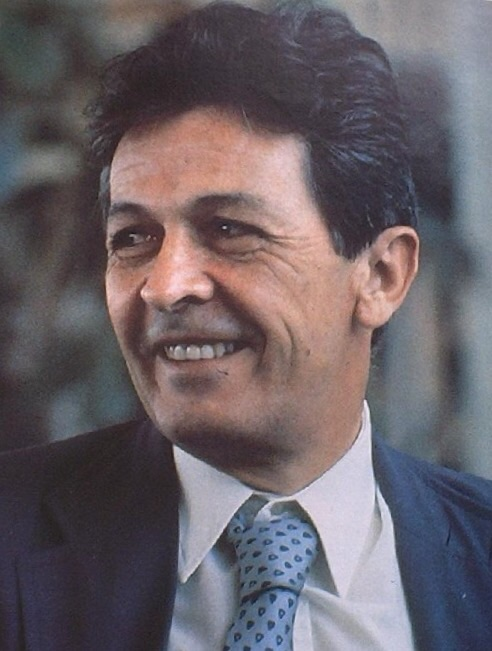

General Secretary of the Italian Communist Party
- In office 17 March 1972 – 11 June 1984
- President: Luigi Longo
- Preceded by: Luigi Longo
- Succeeded by: Alessandro Natta

Member of the Chamber of Deputies
- In office 5 June 1968 – 11 June 1984
- Constituency: Rome

Member of the European Parliament
- In office 17 July 1979 – 20 January 1982
- Constituency: Central Italy

Secretary of the Italian Communist Youth Federation
- In office 12 April 1949 – 14 March 1956
- Preceded by: Agostino Novella
- Succeeded by: Renzo Trivelli

Personal details
- Born: 25 May 1922 Sassari, Kingdom of Italy
- Died: 11 June 1984 (aged 62) Padua, Italy
- Party: Italian Communist Party
- Other political affiliations: Communist and Allies Group
- Spouse: Letizia Laurenti (m. 1957)
- Children: 4, including Bianca
- Parent: Mario Berlinguer (father)
- Relatives: Giovanni Berlinguer (brother); Luigi Berlinguer (cousin); Sergio Berlinguer (cousin); Giuliana Berlinguer (sister-in-law)
- Website: enricoberlinguer.it

Enrico Berlinguer (Italian: [enˈriːko berliŋˈɡwɛr]; 25 May 1922 – 11 June 1984) was an Italian politician and statesman who was the most popular leader of the Italian Communist Party (PCI). He led the PCI as the national secretary from 1972 until his death during a tense period of Italian history, which was marked by the Years of Lead and social conflicts, such as the Hot Autumn of 1969–1970. Berlinguer was born into an upper-class family; his father was a socialist who became a deputy and later senator. After leading the PCI's youth wing in his hometown, he led the Italian Communist Youth Federation (FGCI) at the national level from 1949 to 1956. In 1968, he was elected to Italy's Chamber of Deputies, and he became the leader of the PCI in 1972; he remained a deputy until his death in 1984. Under his leadership, the number of votes for the PCI peaked. The PCI's results in 1976 remain the highest for any Italian left-wing or centre-left party both in terms of votes and vote share, and the party's results in 1984, just after his death, remain the best result for an Italian left-wing party in European elections, and were toppled, in terms of vote share in a lower-turnout election, in the 2014 European Parliament election in Italy.

During his leadership, Berlinguer distanced the party from the influence of the Communist Party of the Soviet Union and pursued a moderate line, repositioning the party within Italian politics and advocating accommodation and national unity. This strategy came to be termed Eurocommunism, and he was seen as its main spokesperson. It came to be adopted by Western Europe's other significant like-minded parties, such as the Communist Party of Spain and later the French Communist Party; its significance as a political force was cemented by a 1977 meeting in Madrid between Berlinguer, Georges Marchais, and Santiago Carrillo. Berlinguer described his alternative model of socialism, distinct from both the Soviet bloc and the capitalism practised by the Western bloc during the Cold War, as terza via (third way, with no relation to the centrist liberal Third Way movement and the politics practised by subsequent prime ministers Romano Prodi and Matteo Renzi), or terza fase (third phase), after the legacy of the Second International and the Comintern had been exhausted.

Under Berlinguer, the PCI reached the height of its success, winning significant victories in the regional and local elections in 1975, and 34% of the vote in the 1976 Italian general election, its highest share of the vote and number of seats. With these gains, he negotiated the Historic Compromise with the DC, lending support to their government in exchange for consultation on policy decisions, as well as social reforms. He took a firm stand against terrorism after the kidnapping and murder of Aldo Moro, and used the PCI's influence to steer Italian labour unions towards moderating wage demands to cope with the country's severe inflation rate after the 1973 oil crisis. These stands were not reciprocated with sufficient concessions from Giulio Andreotti's government, leading the PCI to leave the coalition in 1979. The combination of austerity advocacy, hard line against the Red Brigades, and attempts at an accommodation with the DC affected the PCI's vote at the 1979 Italian general election and the compromise was ultimately ended in 1980. The PCI remained in national opposition for the rest of Berlinguer's tenure, retaining a solid core of support at the 1983 Italian general election; its main strength from that point would remain at the regional and local level. Also a member of the European Parliament from 1979 to 1982, the PCI became the largest party for the first and only time in the 1984 European Parliament election in Italy, which was held a week after his premature death.

One of the most important figures of the First Italian Republic, Berlinguer had an austere and modest but charismatic personality, and despite the difficulties that confronted the PCI during the Historic Compromise, he remained a popular politician, respected for his principles, conviction, and bold stands. He characterised the PCI as an honest party in Italy's corruption-ravaged politics, an image that preserved the party's reputation during the Mani pulite corruption scandals in the 1990s. He was characterised by Patrick McCarthy as "the last great communist leader in Western Europe", and remains identified with the causes of Eurocommunism, opposition to Soviet repression in Eastern Europe, and democratic change in Italy.

== Family ==
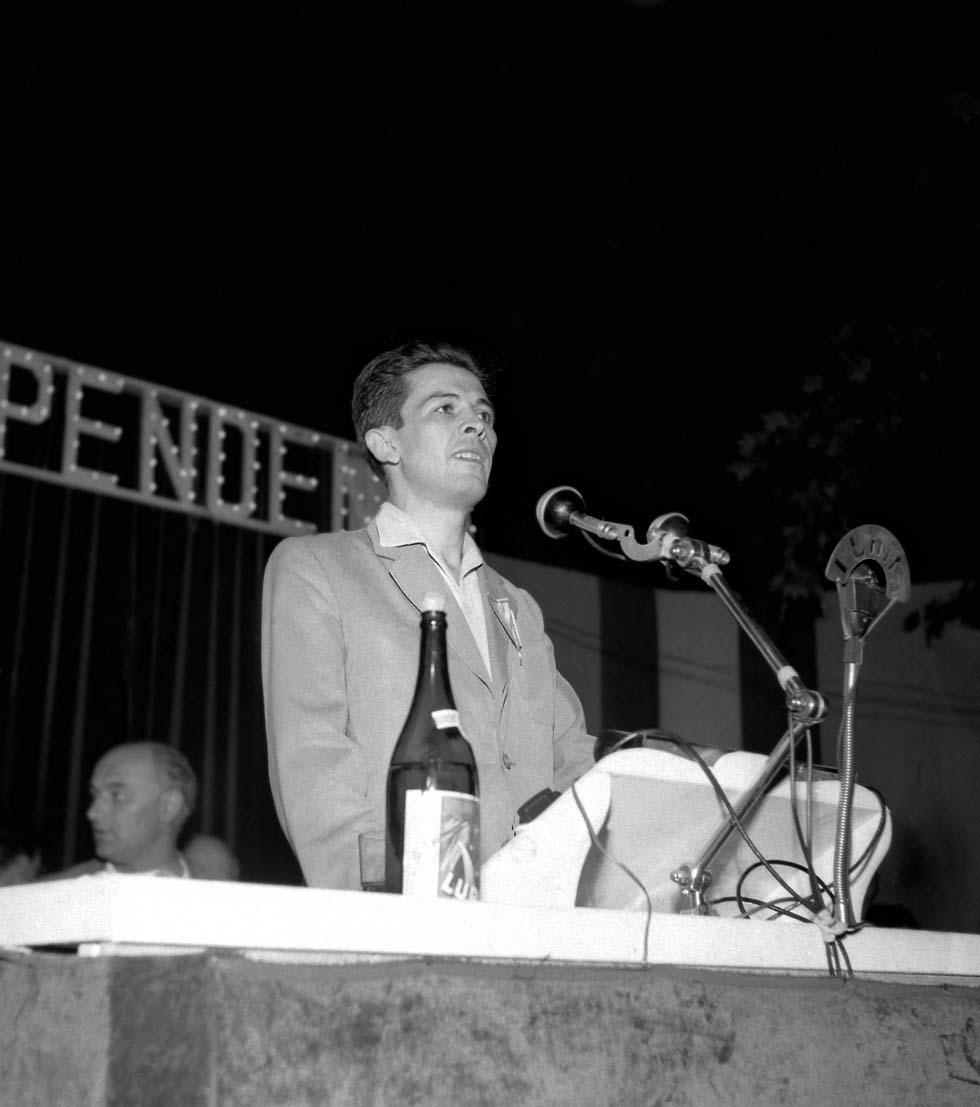
A young Berlinguer during an Italian Communist Party rally

The son of Mario Berlinguer and Maria "Mariuccia" Loriga, Enrico Berlinguer was born in Sassari on 25 May 1922, five months before the March on Rome orchestrated by Benito Mussolini and Italian fascists, to a noble Sardinian family in a notable cultural context, with family ties and political contacts that would heavily influence his life and career. On 29 March 1777, the family had obtained from Vittorio Amedeo III, the then King of Sardinia, the concession to Giovanni and Angelo Ignazio of the noble titles of Cavaliere and Nobile with the honorific of Don and Donna; it was also registered in the Stamenti nobiliari della Sardegna, Sardinia's Italian nobility register, and was linked by a dense network of relatives to other families of the Sardinian aristocracy and bourgeoisie.

Berlinguer's father was a socialist and anti-fascist; as many of his ancestors, he belonged to the Italian Freemasonry and was Great Master (33rd Scottish Rite Mason) of the regular lodge of Sassari. His cousin, Luigi Berlinguer, followed this tradition of left-wing members of Freemasonry. Another cousin of his was Sergio Berlinguer, who was a diplomat. His brother, Giovanni Berlinguer, was a medician and politician who died in 2015. His surname is of Catalan language origin, a reminder of the period when Sardinia was part of the dominions of the Crown of Aragon. He was a second cousin of Francesco Cossiga, who was a leader of Christian Democracy (DC) and later became president of Italy, and both were relatives of Antonio Segni, another DC leader and president of Italy.

Giovanni Loriga and Cossiga's maternal grandfather, Antonio Zanfarino, were half-brothers on their mother side; Loriga was Berlinguer's maternal grandfather. His paternal grandfather, Enrico Berlinguer Sr., was a co-founder of the Sardinian newspaper La Nuova Sardegna and a personal friend of Giuseppe Garibaldi and Giuseppe Mazzini, whom he had helped in his attempts, through his parliamentary work, to improve the sad conditions on the island. Berlinguer's grandmother, Giuseppina Satta Branca, had a brother, Pietro Satta Branca, who was an Italian Republican Party (PRI) member and progressive mayor of Sassari during an era marked by Giovanni Giolitti's rule; Berlinguer Sr. also took part in Satta Branca's administration. Pietro Sanna, one of Berlinguer's childhood friends, recalled: "The Berlinguers, we called them Piringhieri because for us ordinary people a difficult name like theirs was difficult to pronounce. Giovanni, very open and carefree, played boccette, carambola, and sometimes cards, Enrico instead preferred to read."

== Early political career ==
About his adolescence, Berlinguer recalled the feeling of rebellion that was in him. He was against everything: the state, religion, clichés, and social customs. Politically, he felt anarchist when in the library of one of his uncles, a humanitarian socialist, he found a book of Mikhail Bakunin. As a member of the bourgeoisie, he was attracted to the world of the workers and craftsmen, who were followers of Amadeo Bordiga and kept their ideals even under Fascist Italy. He said: "They exerted a strong attraction on me ... there was, in their stories, a lot of suggestion." When meeting Palmiro Togliatti, leader of the Communist Party of Italy (PCd'I), Berlinguer revoked the importance of Sardians to the PCd'I, citing Antonio Gramsci, Velio Spano, and Togliatti, the latter having moved to the Sardianian island.

In 1937, Berlinguer had his first contacts with Sardinian anti-fascists and formally entered the renamed Italian Communist Party (PCI) in 1943, soon becoming the secretary of the Sassari section. The following year, a riot exploded in the town, and he was involved in the disorders and arrested but was discharged after three months of prison. Immediately after his detention ended, his father brought him to Salerno, the town in which the House of Savoy, Italy's royal family, and the government had taken refuge after the armistice of Cassibile between Italy and the Allies of World War II. In Salerno, his father introduced him to Togliatti, the most important leader of the PCI. Togliatti sent Berlinguer back to Sardinia to prepare for his political career; he also met Benedetto Croce, and said that for a period he was a follower of his.

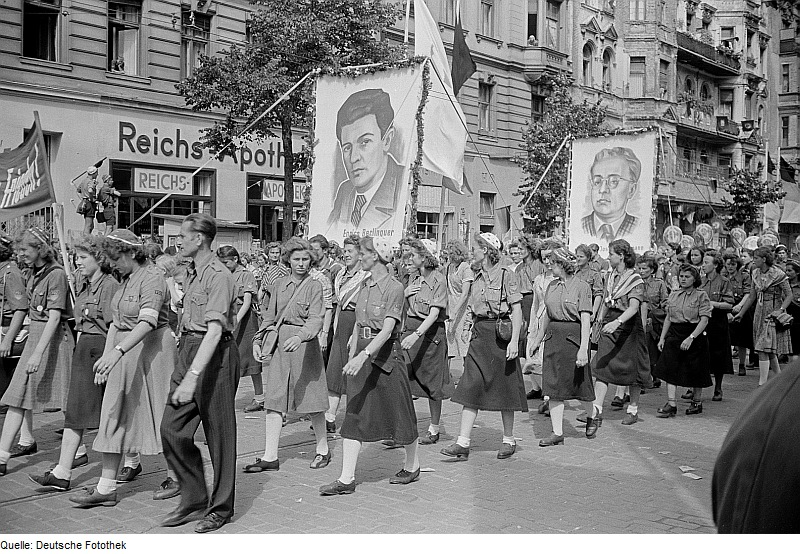
Free German Youth parade with Berlinguer's portrait in 1951

At the end of 1944, Berlinguer was appointed by Togliatti to the national secretariat of the Italian Communist Youth Federation (FGCI). As a secretary of the FGCI, Berlinguer at one point presented Maria Goretti as an example for activists. Berlinguer was soon sent to Milan, and he was appointed to the central committee as a member in 1945. In 1946, Togliatti became the national secretary (the highest political position) of the PCI and called Berlinguer to Rome, where his talents let him enter the national leadership two years later in 1948; at the age of 26, he was one of the youngest members to be admitted. In 1949, he was named national secretary of the FGCI, a post he held until 1956. In 1950, he became president of the World Federation of Democratic Youth, an international anti-fascist youth organisation.

In the post-war years, the PCI respected Joseph Stalin and the Soviet Union for their anti-fascist role in World War II and the Italian resistance movement, and thus avoided criticism; the PCI accepted the 1956 Soviet thesis that denounced Stalin's crimes and at the same time opened up the different national roads to communism. In 1957, as a member of the central school of the PCI, he abolished the obligatory visit to the Soviet Union, including political training there, which had been necessary for admission to the highest positions in the PCI. At the party's twelfth congress in 1969, Berlinguer reiterated the need to "deepen the knowledge of the reality of the socialist countries ... through a historical, critical, objective judgement", which would capture both the positive and negative elements, and "their interweaving and contradictions that derive from it". About the October Revolution and what ensued, he said that it remained "the fundamental discriminant of the contemporary world", and that the PCI would fight for socialism "not looking at an abstract model, nor at the Soviet model ... but along an original path ... that is profoundly new", which entailed full autonomy of elaboration and judgement. In this sense, Berlinguer concluded that "our way of placing ourselves in the face of this reality of socialist countries is therefore, today, new at least in part, and different from the past."

== Secretary of the Italian Communist Party ==
Berlinguer's career was carrying him towards the highest positions in the party. After having held many responsible posts, he was elected in the 1968 Italian general election for the first time a member of the Chamber of Deputies in the electoral district of Rome. The following year, he was elected deputy national secretary of the party, the secretary being Luigi Longo. In this role, he took part in the 1969 International Meeting of Communist and Workers Parties in Moscow, where his delegation disagreed with the official political line and refused to support the final report. Berlinguer's unexpected stance made waves, as he gave the strongest speech by a major Communist leader ever heard in Moscow. He refused to excommunicate the Chinese Communists and directly told Leonid Brezhnev that the Warsaw Pact invasion of Czechoslovakia, which he termed "the tragedy in Prague", had made clear the considerable differences within the international Communist movement on fundamental questions, such as national sovereignty, socialist democracy, and the freedom of culture. This dissent, which was termed "the new course", was followed by further condemnations in the 1980s.

Already a prominent leader in the party, Berlinguer was elected to the position of national secretary in 1972, when Longo resigned on grounds of ill health. At the party's thirteenth congress that elected him, Berlinguer said that he would be neither Togliatti nor Longo. In 1973, having been hospitalised after a car accident during a visit to the People's Republic of Bulgaria, later claimed to have been an attempted assassination orchestrated by Moscow, Berlinguer wrote three famous articles ("Reflections on Italy", "After the Facts of Chile", and "After the Coup [in Chile]") for the party's intellectual weekly magazine Rinascita. In these, he presented the strategy of the Historic Compromise, a proposed coalition between the PCI and the DC to grant Italy a period of political stability, at a time of severe economic crisis, and in a context in which, after Piano Solo and Golpe Borghese had been revealed, some forces were allegedly manoeuvering for a coup d'état in Italy.

In "Reflections of Italy", Berlinguer explicitly cited the historic compromise and wrote: "The seriousness of the country's problems, the ever looming threats of reactionary adventures, and the need to finally open up to the nation a sure path of economic development, social renewal, and democratic progress make it ever more urgent and mature that we reach what can be defined as the great new 'historic compromise' between the forces that gather and represent the great majority of the Italian people." By this, Berlinguer meant that it was illusory to believe that, even if left-wing parties had managed to reach 51 per cent of the votes and parliamentary representation, this would have guaranteed the life of a government that was the expression of that 51 per cent as opposed to the oppositional front at 49 per cent. Within this context, over a left-wing alternative, he proposed a democratic alternative that would have resulted in a collaboration between communists, socialists, and Christian democrats. This policy was not popular among the party and its base. It was not well received by Longo, who became the party's president in August 1972 and did not like the compromise phrasing. Among the working-class base, Berlinguer was asked in some meetings with workers whether there was no "risk of yielding to the bosses" or whether this policy did not "weaken the spirit of the Communists".

=== International relations ===
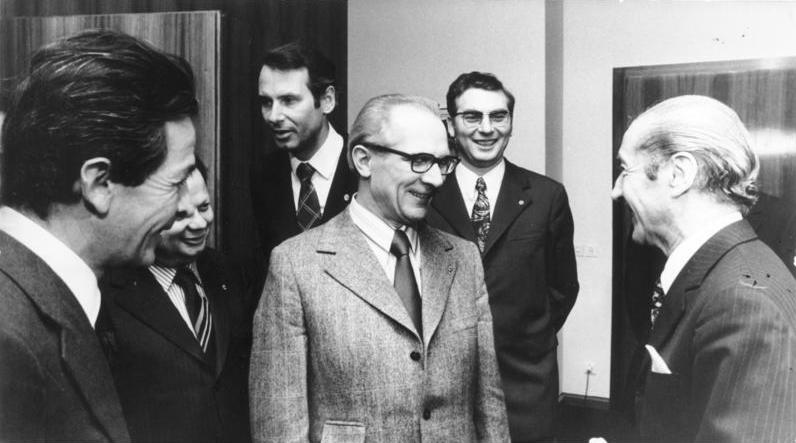
Berlinguer (left) with the East German leader Erich Honecker in 1973

In 1973, Berlinguer went to Belgrade, the capital of the Socialist Federal Republic of Yugoslavia, to meet with Yugoslav president Josip Broz Tito, with a view to further developing his relationships with the major Communist parties of Europe, Asia, and Africa. In 1976, Berlinguer confirmed the autonomous position of the PCI vis-à-vis the Communist Party of the Soviet Union (CPSU). Before 5,000 Communist delegates in Moscow, he spoke of pluralistic system, which was translated by the interpreter as multiform, and referred to the PCI's intentions to build "a socialism that we believe necessary and possible only in Italy". In one of his speeches in Moscow, Igor Ponomariov, Leonid Brezhnev's closest collaborator, left the room visibly annoyed. In September 1976, during the Festa dell'Unità in Turin, Mikhail Gorbachev, the then secretary of the Russian district of Stavropol, having learned about his speeches in Moscow, asked to meet Berlinguer. In November 1977, upon the celebration of the 60th anniversary of the October Revolution, Berlinguer held another speech in Moscow titled "Democracy is a Universal Value".

When Berlinguer secured the PCI's condemnation of any kind of interference, the rupture with the Soviets was effectively complete, although the party still for some years received money from Moscow. The Soviets said it seemed that the only interference that the Italian Communists could not suffer was the Soviet one. In an interview held on 10 June 1976 with Corriere della Sera, Berlinguer declared that he felt "safer under NATO's umbrella". Berlinguer's acceptance of NATO did not dent American suspicion of him; appearing on the cover of Time on 14 June 1976, he was named "The Red Threat". In a 1975 speech to Italy's Chamber of Deputies, Berlinguer had said that the Italian Communists had sympathy for the American people and wanted to cultivate a friendship with the United States but that the "respect for alliances does not mean that Italy has to keep its head down". At the same time, he ruled out Italy leaving NATO on the grounds that unilateral exits of individual countries from the NATO or the Warsaw Pact would have disturbed the process of international détente.

=== Eurocommunism ===
In a 1975 speech for Dolores Ibárruri, Berlinguer stated: "It is necessary that with audacity and intelligence we know how to free ourselves from any scholastic application of our doctrine understood as dogma, or from orientations that are no longer adequate to current experience and historical conditions, to walk towards new ways of advancing towards socialism." That same year also saw the joint statement of Berlinguer and Santiago Carrillo of the Spanish Communist Party, which said: "The Italian and Spanish Communists solemnly declare that — in their conception of a democratic advance towards socialism in peace and freedom — what is expressed is not a tactical attitude but a strategic conviction." Berlinguer reiterated this feeling in a 1976 meeting in Moscow, where he said: "We are fighting for a socialist society which is the highest point in the development of all democratic achievements and guarantees respect for all individual and collective freedoms, religious freedoms and freedom of culture, art and science. We think that in Italy we can and must ... build a socialist society with the contribution of political forces, organisations, different parties, and that the working class can and must affirm its historical function in a pluralistic and democratic system."

In 1977, at a meeting in Madrid between Berlinguer, Carrillo, and Georges Marchais of the French Communist Party, the fundamental lines of Eurocommunism were laid out. A few months later, Berlinguer was again in Moscow, where he gave another speech that was poorly received by his hosts and published by Pravda, the PCSU's official newspaper, in a censored version. About democracy, Berlinguer said: "The experience gained has led us to the conclusion that democracy today is not only the ground on which the class adversary is forced to retreat, but it is also the historically universal value on which to found an original socialist society." The years after the Communists first joined the European Parliament in 1969 saw a process towards pro-Europeanism that culminated in the 1976 Italian general election with the candidacy within the PCI's electoral list of Altiero Spinelli, the Italian father of European federalism and one of the founding fathers of the European Union. In the words of historian Antonio Varsori, the PCI interpreted the pro-European option as "an opportunity to overcome the division of the old continent and for the birth of a socialist, neutralist, and tendentially pro-Third World Europe".

=== Historic Compromise ===
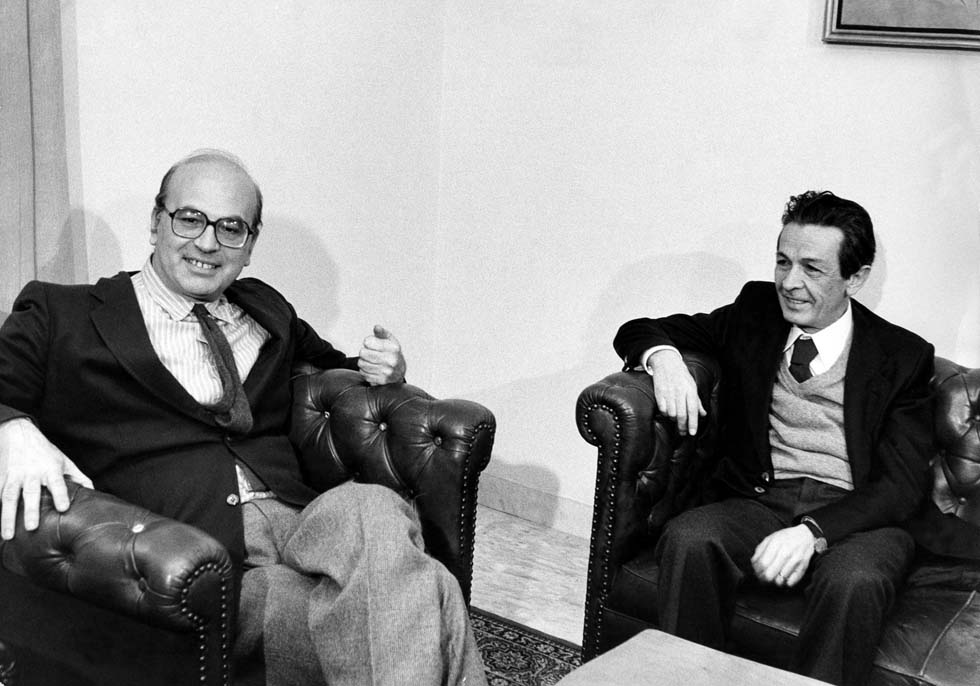
Berlinguer with the Italian Socialist Party leader Bettino Craxi

Moving step by step, Berlinguer was building a consensus in the PCI towards a rapprochement with other components of society. After the surprising opening of 1970 toward conservatives and the still discussed proposal of the Historic Compromise, he published a correspondence with Monsignor Luigi Bettazzi, the Bishop of Ivrea; it was an astonishing event since Pope Pius XII had excommunicated the communists soon after World War II and the possibility of any relationship between communists and Catholics seemed very unlikely. This act also served to counteract the allegation, commonly and popularly expressed, that the PCI was protecting leftist terrorists in the harshest years of terrorism in Italy. In this context, the PCI opened its doors to many Catholics and a debate started about the possibility of contact. Notably, Berlinguer's Catholic family was not brought in out of its strictly respected privacy. In the 1975 Italian regional elections, the left-wing coalition led by the PCI added to Emilia-Romagna, Tuscany, and Umbria the regions of Piedmont, Liguria, Marche, and Lazio. As a party, the PCI confirmed itself in the 1975 Italian local elections, which were held on the same day on 15–16 June, where it won 33.4% of the votes compared to the 35.3% of the votes of the DC. In June 1976, the PCI obtained what would be its best result in the party's history and gained 34.4% of the vote.

In Italy, while a government of national solidarity was ruling, Berlinguer said that in an emergency government a strong and powerful cabinet to solve a crisis of exceptional gravity was needed. On 16 March 1978, Aldo Moro, president of the DC, was kidnapped by the Red Brigades, a Marxist–Leninist terrorist group, on the day that the new government was going to be sworn in before the Italian Parliament. During this crisis, Berlinguer adhered to the fronte della fermezza (front of firmness), refusing to negotiate with terrorists, who had proposed to liberate Moro in exchange for the release of some imprisoned terrorists. Despite the PCI's firm stand against terrorism, the Moro incident left the party more isolated. In June 1978, the PCI gave its approval and ultimately active support to a campaign against Giovanni Leone, the then president of Italy who was accused of being involved in the Lockheed bribery scandal, which resulted in his resignation. Berlinguer supported the election of the veteran socialist Sandro Pertini as president of Italy; his presidency did not produce the effects that the PCI had hoped for. In Italy, after a new president is elected, the government resigns. The PCI expected Pertini to use his influence in its favour but was instead influenced by other political leaders like Giovanni Spadolini of the PRI and Bettino Craxi of the Italian Socialist Party (PSI), and thus the PCI remained out of the government. About Craxi, Berlinguer said: "The thing that worries me about Craxi is that sometimes it seems to me that he thinks only of power for power's sake."

The Historic Compromise ended in 1979 when the PCI exited from the parliamentary majority, amid negative electoral trends. The policy was unpopular among its base and was criticised for its contradictions, such as how to start a path towards socialism through a compromise with the DC, which was not economically socialist and from 1947 onwards had always been considered by the PCI as its historical enemy, what would have been the most urgent socialist-leaning measures, and the fact that on those points Berlinguer remained vague. Another contradiction was that, in the winter of 1976–1977, severe deflationary economic maneuvers were implemented and mostly hit the working class; before the Historic Compromise, the PCI would have defined those maneuvers as a sting to be fought firmly but now accepted it as part of a two-stage policy (first the recovery measures, then the reforms), which was similar to that adopted by the PSI in the Organic centre-left governments that the PCI had criticised. At the same time, the policy is praised for its uncompromising support of democracy and civil rights.

Berlinguer continued with the policy on the grounds that the process of legitimising communists would be long (the United States were bitterly opposed even under Jimmy Carter), and that choosing the election route, in the middle of serious economic and terrorist crises, would favour the political right. In early 1978, the Historic Compromise led to the "contracted, recognised, and explicit" participation of the PCI in the majority government that would support Giulio Andreotti's new cabinet that was defined as one of national solidarity. The beginnings of this government were negative for the PCI because Moro had introduced personalities deeply disliked by Communists, in order to bring the whole DC to this agreement with the PCI, including the currents that opposed it, and Berlinguer thought of voting negative in a motion of confidence. Before this could happen, Moro was kidnapped and killed, and the PCI suffered losses in the 1979 Italian general election held in June.

=== Domestic policies and views ===
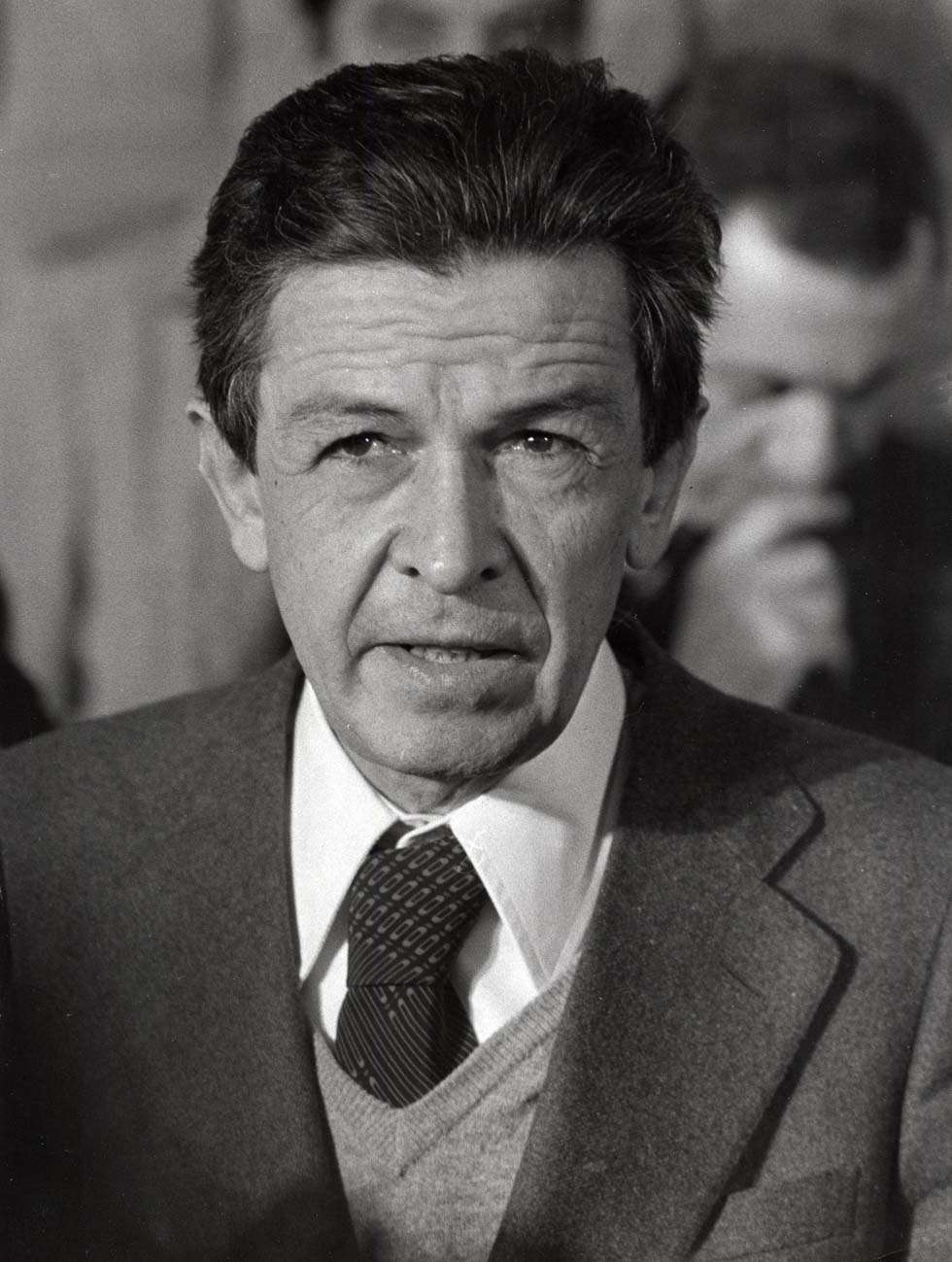
Berlinguer in the 1970s

During the 1970s, the PCI governed many Italian regions, sometimes more than half of them. Notably, the regional governments of Emilia-Romagna and Tuscany were concrete proof of PCI's governmental capabilities. In this period, Berlinguer turned his attention to the exercise of local power to show that "the trains could run on time" under the PCI. He personally took part in electoral campaigns in the provinces and local councils. While other parties sent only local leaders, this helped the party to win many elections at these levels. In the June 1975 regional elections, the PCI's gap from the DC, which had been 10% points in the 1970 Italian regional elections, narrowed to less than two per cent at 1.8%, the PCI having jumped to 33.4% after a surge of 6.2%, while the DC fell to 35.2%, with a loss of 3.6%. In the June 1976 national elections, the PCI continued to grow at 34.4%; while the DC recovered and achieved 38.7%, the minor parties had dropped, and there were no longer the numbers for centrist governments. About the future, in an interview in June 1981 to Moby Dick, the monthly of the Sicilian FGCI, Berlinguer said: "We save ourselves and move forward if we act together and not just one by one."

In a 1980 interview with Oriana Fallaci, Berlinguer said: "We are communists. We are communists with originality and peculiarity, distinguishing ourselves from all the other communist parties: but we are communists, we remain communists." About fanaticism, he told Fallaci: "I don't throw rants at anyone, I don't like to hurl curses, curses are expressions of fanaticism and there is too much fanaticism in the world." That same year, he stated on Tribuna politica that communism is "the just transformation of society". In an interview in 1981 with Eugenio Scalfari of la Repubblica, Berlinguer outlined the questione morale, or moral question. He said: "Today's parties are above all machines of power and clientela." About the moral question, he added: "The moral question has existed for some time, but it has now become the first and essential political question because the recovery of trust in the institutions, the effective governance of the country, and the stability of the democratic regime depend on its solution." About capitalism, he said: "We think that the capitalist type of economic and social development is the cause of serious distortions, of immense costs and social inequalities, of enormous waste of wealth."

In a 1981 interview to Critica marxista, Berlinguer outlined the difference from other parties. He said: "Our main difference from the others is that we Communists do not give up working and fighting for a radical transformation of society and the construction of a society of free and equal people. They would like left-wing parties that would limit themselves to correcting some flaws in the current system: we are not that type of party and we never will be." In the same interview, he reiterated: "We do not give up building a 'society of free and equal', we do not give up leading the struggle of men and women for the production of the conditions of their lives." He stated that this was the main difference from social democrats and other socialists, and said that "they put the commitment to change the given structure between parents, leading them to the obfuscation and loss of their own ideal and political autonomy. Our difference from social democracy lies in the fact that we communists will never give up that transforming commitment. About other Communist parties, he said: "Our main 'anomaly' compared to several other communist and workers' parties is that we are convinced that in the process towards this goal we must remain — and we will remain — faithful to the method of democracy. The 'assault on heaven' — this beautiful image of Marx — is not for us Italian communists a project of irrationalistic climbing to the absolute." In a speech delivered by Berlinguer at the FGCI congress held in Milan in 1982, he said: "If young people organise themselves, take over every branch of knowledge, and fight with the workers and the oppressed, there is no escape for an old order founded on privilege and injustice."

In an article written for Rinascita on 6 December 1982, titled "Party and Society in the Reality of the 1980s", Berlinguer said: "There can be no inventiveness, imagination, creation of the new if you start by burying yourself, your history and reality." In an interview in 1983 with Ferdinando Adornato, he said about communism that "scientists are discussing more about the sole dell'avvenire [the establishment of socialism] today than the communists." That same year, in an interview with Giovanni Minoli about the labour movement, he stated: "We refuse to let the usual ones pay, the workers, the popular masses. And we believe that if there must be sacrifices, and everyone must contribute proportionately, they must contribute to achieving certain goals, not to make the country go backwards." In his last rally, held on 7 June 1984, before his death, Berlinguer said: "We are convinced that the world, even this terrible, intricate world of today, can be known, interpreted, transformed, and put at the service of man, his well-being, his happiness. The test for this goal is a test that can worthily fill a life." During his final rally, held just days later in Padua, he stated: "Everyone work, house by house, company by company, street by street, in dialogue with the citizens, with trust for the battles we have waged, for the proposals we are presenting, for what we were and are. It is possible to win new and wider support for our lists, for our cause, which is the cause of peace, freedom, work, the progress of our civilisation!"

=== Break with the Soviet Union and the Democratic Alternative ===
In 1980, the PCI publicly condemned the Soviet invasion of Afghanistan, and Moscow then immediately sent Georges Marchais to Rome to try to bring Berlinguer into line; he was received with perceptible coldness. The break with the Soviets and other Communist parties became clear when the PCI did not participate in the 1980 International Conference of Communist Parties held in Paris. Instead, Berlinguer made an official visit to China. In November 1980, Berlinguer declared in Salerno that the idea of a possible Historic Compromise had been put aside, and it would be replaced with the idea of the Democratic Alternative to both the real socialism of the East and the then social democracy of the West.

In 1981, Berlinguer said that, in his personal opinion, the progressive force of the October Revolution had been exhausted. The PCI criticised the martial law in Poland and soon the PCI's split with the CPSU became definitive and official, followed by a long polemic between Pravda and l'Unità (the official newspaper of PCI), not made any milder after an October meeting with Cuban leader Fidel Castro in Havana; the PCI joked that they succeeded where the CIA failed when Berlinguer closed the hand of Castro's security chief in the door of a GAZ Chaika who let out a single stoic moan (l'Unità's Havana correspondent recalled that "a sinister noise of broken bones" was heard) before being hospitalised but the episode did not spoil Berlinguer's visit. Nonetheless, his last years were marked by attempts for unity among the national and international political left. He also continued to underline the necessary link between democracy and socialism, which was followed by a strong commitment on the issues of nuclear disarmament and détente.

== Death and funeral ==
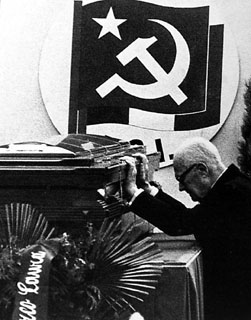
Sandro Pertini, the then Italian president, at Berlinguer's funeral in 1984

Berlinguer's last major statement was a call for the solidarity among the leftist parties. On 7 June 1984, he suffered a brain haemorrhage while giving a speech at a public meeting in Padua. He entered a coma on the same day and died on 11 June, four days later. During this time, Sandro Pertini, the then Italian president, remained at the hospital with Berlinguer's family. More than a million people attended his funeral in the Archbasilica of St. John Lateran at Piazza San Giovanni, the largest funeral in Italy's history at the time. Reflecting his stature in Italian politics, the leaders of all parties paid tribute to his career and the Vatican expressed condolences.

Apart from all the major politicians across the political spectrum, many international figures, such as the Soviet deputy leader Mikhail Gorbachev and Chinese prime minister Zhao Ziyang, attended his funeral. From Gorbachev and Zhao to Georges Marchais, Santiago Carrillo, Yasser Arafat, and the Communists of the Philippines, Israel, Yugoslavia, and North Korea, to Giancarlo Pajetta and Pietro Ingrao, who said that the party would not deny him and that Communists would try to carry his name, they respended him and recognised him as an international leader. At his funeral, Tomaso Albinoni's "Adagio in G minor" and Johann Sebastian Bach and Franz Schubert's music were played. Much discussed, including from other parties like the DC and PSI and their representatives, such as Ciriaco De Mita, who praised the Historic Compromise, and Rino Formica, who said that the PCI had to decide between the left-wing alternative and the Historic Compromise, was the future of the PCI.

After his funeral, Berlinguer was interred in Rome's Cimitero di Prima Porta. His death took place six days before the 1984 European Parliament election in Italy. The PCI gained a significant sympathy vote as a result, winning the most votes for the only time. His death remains controversial due to the fact he was taken back to the hotel to rest and an ambulance was called only two hours after he first fell ill. According to sociologist and journalist Rocco Turi, Berlinguer died not as a result of a cerebral stroke but for the direct responsibilities that he links to a series of delays in the same first aid operations. He said that "we are now able to deny the theses of those years. They waited too long to take Berlinguer to the hospital; after the first illness, Berlinguer was in fact transported slowly first to the hotel, and then after more than two hours an ambulance was finally called. A completely crazy choice." Additionally, Turi said that Berlinguer was not operated on as soon as he arrived at the hospital, as is commonly understood, but that he was only taken to the operating room at 1:00 pm, after about two hours spent in the hotel, and two and a half hours later from his illness in Piazza della Frutta. He tied his death to that of Aldo Moro.

== Personal life ==
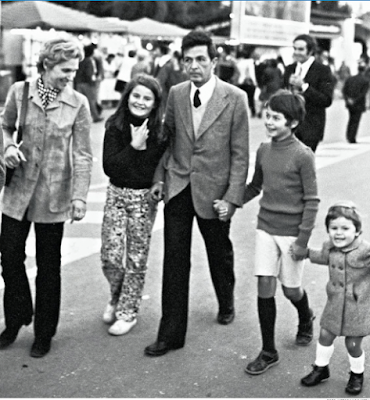
Berlinguer with his family in Rome, 1972. From left to right, the children are Bianca, Marco, and Laura.

A non-believer, Berlinguer married in a civil ceremony the religious Letizia Laurenti (1928–2017), whom he met during a holiday in the Aosta Valley, on 26 September 1957 in the Capitoline Hill; they had been engaged for ten years, and both the PCI and her family were against it. While seemingly cold in public and in front of their children, their relationship has been described as "a love from Romeo and Juliet". Together, they had four children: former TG3 journalist Bianca Maria (born 1959), RAI journalist Maria Stella (born 1961), Communist Refoundation Party politician Marco (born 1963), and Mediaset journalist Laura (born 1970). He often used to give his children tutoring lessons, including after a political meeting was concluded, on topics like Georg Wilhelm Friedrich Hegel and pre-Socratic philosophers but never in a forceful way; he did not expect them to follow his path in politics. Berlinguer said that they "must be able to make their choices freely, without any prejudice".

As a Sardinian, Berlinguer said that he was a supporter of Cagliari Calcio; like many other communist and left-wing leaders, including Palmiro Togliatti and allegedly Antonio Gramsci, he was said to have been a supporter of Juventus. As many of his security escorts were supporters of SS Lazio, Berlinguer was forced to watch the club's matches. He once left in the middle of a lunch with party members to watch a Juventus match. Another time, near the government building of the Palazzo della Farnesina, he saw a group of kids playing association football and started playing with them. Outside of politics and his passion for football, which he played as a child with his brother, Berlinguer played Rummy and loved the sea and sailing. Whenever he could, he would go on his cousin's boat in Stintino, manoeuvring the mainsails and jibs with dexterity. In 1977, he risked his life when, not following the recommendation by relatives and sailors, he went out by boat because he could not return to Stintino for safety reasons. When the wind picked up, the sea got rough, and for several hours no one heard news about Berlinguer until his cousin Francesco Cossiga, the then interior minister, sent patrol boats to search for him.

Berlinguer was a lover of ballet and opera, the last one he had seen was Wagner's Parsifal in Rome. Apart from philosophical and ideological readings, such as Gramsci's mistica and the modern Machiavellian Prince, Berlinguer was an avid reader of novels; before his death, he last finished reading one by Marguerite Yourcenar. Very close to his family, he spent every Christmas with his brother and sister-in-law, and never had an hour of vacation without at least one of his children; he also gave regular visits to his ninety-year-old aunt, Iole Siglienti, every time she came in Cagliari. He was a fan of Roberto Benigni, about whom he said that he made him laugh even before he said his jokes, and iconic is the photo of him, laughing in Benigni's arms at the Villa Borghese Festival. Berlinguer almost never understood Giorgio Forattini's cartoons, and said: "He's our enemy." Within the context of the Years of Lead, Berlinguer had a security escort that included an armoured Alfa Romeo 2000 Berlina. Alberto Menichelli, Berlinguer's personal car driver, said that "if Moro had had it, they wouldn't have been able to do what happened in via Fani". Menichelli, who said that it was an honour to be able to accompagny Berlinguer for fifteen years, continued to keep his memory alive with the Enrico Berlinguer Quadraro-Cinecittà cultural association, exhibitions, and other initiatives and about 300 members. A fan of motorcycles, Berlinguer came to be the owner of an Harley Davidson. Renzo Trivelli told Corriere della Sera that Berlinguer bought "a Harley Davidson that [was] too big for him; when he arrives at the [PCI] offices, his supervisors help him get on and off the vehicle. A few months later, citing security reasons, the party forbade him to use it."

== Legacy ==
=== Personality ===
Not many journalists could have interviewed Berlinguer, as he could not bear fame and discouraged anecdotes. He was described as reserved, "bashful, probably shy", and not much was known about his private life, including his music preferences, whether Bach or Wagner, when he was alive. A Sardinian fisherman who had known him in distant times told a reporter that "[Berlinguer] was a serious, very reserved child. He never laughed." Berlinguer was so shy that, before a rally, he sipped a little whiskey that the driver Alberto Menichelli handed him from a small bottle kept in his jacket pocket. His notable 1983 television interview with Giovanni Minoli on Mixer is seen as evidence of Berlinguer not being corroded by vanity. In that same interview, asked about which was the quality he was most fond of, Berlinguer responded: "That of having remained faithful to the ideals of my youth."

Berlinguer has been described in many ways but was generally recognised for political coherence and courage, together with a rare personal and political intelligence. A serious and morally rigorous man, he was sincerely respected even by his opponents, such as the Italian Social Movement leader Giorgio Almirante, who paid his homage to Berlinguer and lowered himself in front to his coffin at Botteghe Oscure. Riccardo Bisognero, the then Commander-General of the Carabinieri, said: "He was not only the leader of a political party, but a point of reference for Italian democracy." His three days of agony were followed with great attention by the general population. Attended by more than a million people, his funeral was among the highest ever seen in Rome, and was reminiscent of the funeral of Palmiro Togliatti in 1964; in both cases, a group of directors filmed the event for a documentary. From Almirante to the then president of the Senate, Francesco Cossiga, to then interior minister Oscar Luigi Scalfaro, from all the major Italian personalities across the political spectrum to common people, including women and the youth, they all paid their respect to Berlinguer.

=== Politics ===
Berlinguer's most important political act of his career in the PCI was the break with Soviet Communism, together with the creation of Eurocommunism and his substantial work towards contact with the moderate and particularly the Catholic half of the country. As evidence of his legacy, the Five Star Movement (M5S) put him in their pantheon and the former M5S leader Luigi Di Maio, who culturally formed himself on the political right, claimed Berlinguer's legacy. Pierpaolo Farina, a young blogger, built a website about Berlinguer for the youth and those who had not known him, and soon reached 300,000 contacts. The fact that Berlinguer went down in history for preaching austerity, in Pier Paolo Pasolini's terms expressed as a warning in 1974 that "true fascism is the consumer society", is seen as a testament to his durature legacy and thinking. Even after 35 years since his death, in the words of Eugenio Scalfari, "Enrico Berlinguer had a somewhat similar role in Italian politics (and not only) to the one Pope Francis is having today in the Catholic religion (and not only). Both followed a path of reformism so radical as to produce revolutionary effects; both were loved and respected even by their adversaries; both had a charisma that grasped reality and fueled a dream."

In the words of Giorgio Bocca, in his analysis after his death, Berlinguer had understood that, after "the lacerations, the convulsions, the loss of prestige, of dynamism, of leadership of the PCI and of the left in general in the Seventies" that had derived "above all from the cultural inadequacy of a sclerotic Marxism and a formalist anti-fascism", he needed "to bring back to the party and the left what remains alive of Marxism, its humanism, the defence of man from the exploitation and alienation that continue and perhaps worsen in post-industrial society." In the words of sociologist Francesco Alberoni, Berlinguer's critique of Soviet Communism was "never crude or hostile", and he had "always considered it a deviation from an original project, an error, understandable in those historical situations, and correctable in the future. This is typical of the great ideological, intellectual leader who interprets history with a view to the future. It was these merits of him, as leader of an Italian party, as a democrat, as an outstanding ideological figure of international Communism, that provoked the sense of loss everywhere and even the homage of enemies."

Berlinguer's search for a new socialism was to find a solution to the bipolar international blocs, and his name is thus associated to that of Willy Brandt and Olof Palme. In October 2012, Nichi Vendola said of his alternative Europeanism that "the one that we continue to dream is not the unbalanced power that rules today, with an unknown identity. No: it is the Europe of Willy Brandt, of Olof Palme, of Enrico Berlinguer." Within the broad international Communist movement, Berlinguer had many opponents. The more orthodox Marxist–Leninist opposition argued that he had turned a workers' party into a bourgeois and revisionist one. External opponents said that the strappo, the break with the CPSU, took several years to be completed; this was seen as evidence that there had been no definitive decision on the point. The acceptance of NATO is generally seen as evidence of the genuine autonomy of the PCI's position, and Berlinguer was seen in declassified CIA documents as the strongest critic of Soviet actions, such as their role in suppressing the Prague Spring of 1968, which was a turning point. Despite notably successful Communist local governments, Berlinguer's efforts failed to bring the PCI into government. His final platform, "The Democratic Alternative", was never realised. Within a decade of his death, the Soviet Union and the DC and PCI parties all disappeared, leading to the Second Italian Republic and transforming Italian politics beyond recognition. For some, for the vast population on the political left, which felt dispersed, his death marked the end of the PCI. On his death, not only the head of the largest Communist party in the West died but also an idea to which millions of Italians had dedicated a good part of their existence during the 20th century, what Francesco Guccini called "the timeless dreams".

=== Impact on Italian society ===
Italian Communists signing the frontpage of l'Unità at Berlinguer's funeral

As one of the most important figures of the First Italian Republic, Berlinguer's impact on Italian society is reflected in references in popular culture, with a general love, admiration, and respect that transcended political affiliations. Italian actor and director Roberto Benigni declared publicly his admiration and personal love for Berlinguer. Besides making him the protagonist of the movie Berlinguer, I Love You, Benigni appeared with Berlinguer during a public political demonstration of the PCI, of which he was a sympathiser. Italian singer-songwriter Antonello Venditti posthumously dedicated a song, "Dolce Enrico" ("Sweet Enrico"), to Berlinguer. Italian folk music band Modena City Ramblers wrote a song about Berlinguer's funeral, which was published on their first full-length album Riportando tutto a casa and was titled "I funerali di Berlinguer".

An il Giornale nuovo article after his death proposed the psychological thesis that Berlinguer was not really loved but that people were forced to admire him and recognise his virtues. His qualities, such as reserve, honesty, seriousness, and puritanical rigour, made him a foreigner at home, and his death freed many people of a burden but also created a sense of guilt that was reflected in collective mourning and tributes from his adversaries.

== Electoral history ==
Election	House	Constituency	Party	Votes	Result
1968	Chamber of Deputies	Rome–Viterbo–Latina–Frosinone	PCI	151,134	Elected
1972	Chamber of Deputies	Rome–Viterbo–Latina–Frosinone	PCI	230,722	Elected
1976	Chamber of Deputies	Rome–Viterbo–Latina–Frosinone	PCI	280,414	Elected
1979	Chamber of Deputies	Rome–Viterbo–Latina–Frosinone	PCI	238,399	Elected
1979	European Parliament	Central Italy	PCI	836,595	Elected
1983	Chamber of Deputies	Rome–Viterbo–Latina–Frosinone	PCI	221,307	Elected
1984	European Parliament	Central Italy	PCI	719,323	Elected

== Books ==
- Berlinguer, Enrico; Bronda, Antonio; Bodington, Stephen (1982). After Poland. Nottingham: Spokesman Books. ISBN 0-85124-344-4.

== Films ==
- Berlinguer, I Love You (1977) by Giuseppe Bertolucci
- Prima della fine – Gli ultimi giorni di Enrico Berlinguer (2024) by Samuele Rossi
- The Great Ambition (2024) by Andrea Segre

== See also ==
- Berlinguer

== Bibliography ==
- Wilsford, David, ed. (1995). Political Leaders of Contemporary Western Europe: A Biographical Dictionary. Greenwood. pp. 31–44. ISBN 978-0-3132-8623-0.

Party political offices
Preceded by Luigi Longo	Secretary of the Italian Communist Party; 1972–1984	Succeeded by Alessandro Natta
