= Luigi Manconi =

Italian academic and politician (born 1948)

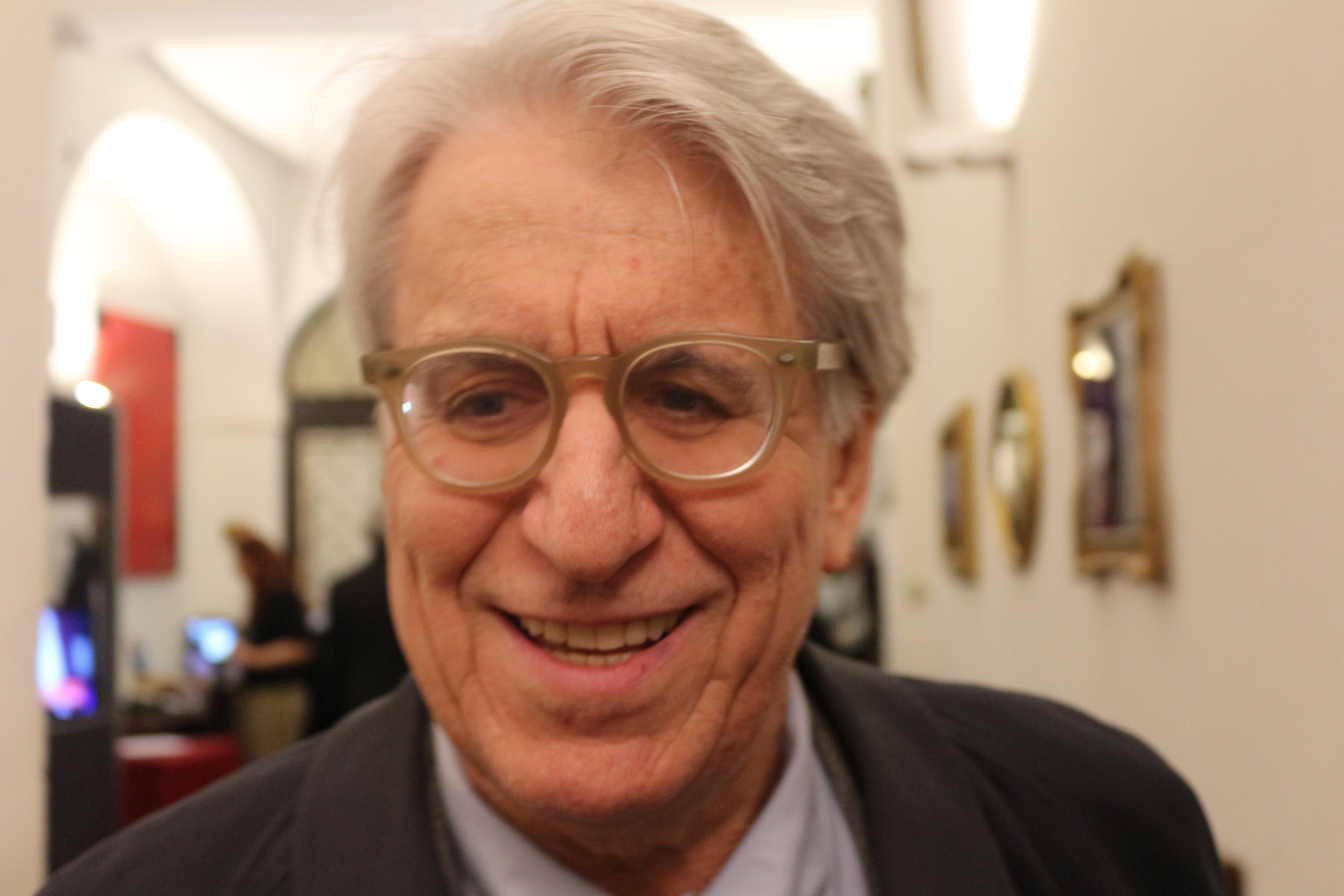
- Luigi Manconi in 2018

Member of the Senate of the Republic
- In office 16 March 2013 – 22 March 2018
- Constituency: Sardinia
- In office 15 April 1994 – 29 May 2001
- Constituency: Marche

Personal details
- Born: 21 February 1948 (age 78) Sassari, Italy
- Party: LC (1969–1975); FdV (1996–2005); DS (2005–2007); PD (since 2007)
- Domestic partner: Bianca Berlinguer (1997–present)
- Children: 3
- Education: University of Milan
- Occupation: Academic; politician; journalist

Luigi Manconi (born 21 February 1948) is an Italian academic and politician. A member of the Democratic Party, he was a senator from 1994 to 2001 and again from 2013 to 2018.

== Early life and career ==
Manconi graduated in Political Sciences at the University of Milan and started teaching Sociology in the University of Palermo and the IULM University of Milan. In the 1980s, Manconi founded and directed, together with Massimo Cacciari and Rossana Rossanda, the magazine Antigone. He was a columnist and commentator for Italian newspapers, such as Il Messaggero, Corriere della Sera, La Stampa; he is currently a columnist for Il Foglio and La Repubblica.

== Political career ==
In 1994, Manconi was elected, as an independent, senator on the list of the Greens, and again elected in the following elections. He took part in the work of numerous commissions on the issues that have always characterized his militancy and his research activities: justice and guarantee, individual freedoms and social guarantees, and the autonomy of the person.

In 2005, Manconi joined the Democrats of the Left for which he was head of the national civil rights department and a member of the national leadership. He was undersecretary of state for Justice in the Prodi II Cabinet from 2006 to 2008.

In 2013, Manconi was elected senator in the list of the Democratic Party and was appointed president of the Human rights Commission of the Senate.

Manconi supported a No vote in the constitutional referendum of 4 December 2016. On 23 October 2017 Manconi did not participate in the votes of confidence on Rosatellum, the new electoral law. In October and December 2017 he launched the initiative of a hunger strike for the approval of the jus soli law, which did not reach the quorum in the Senate.

On 2 February 2018, Prime Minister Paolo Gentiloni appointed Manconi as coordinator of the Office for the Promotion of Equal Treatment and the Removal of Discrimination established within the Department for Equal Opportunities.

== Personal life ==
He is the father of three children: Davide, Giacomo – by his first wife – and Giulia – by his current partner, journalist Bianca Berlinguer. Since 2007 he has suffered from a severe form of low vision caused by several factors, including glaucoma, retinal detachment, and severe myopia.
