= Luigi Berlinguer =

Italian jurist and politician (1932–2023)

Luigi Berlinguer OMRI
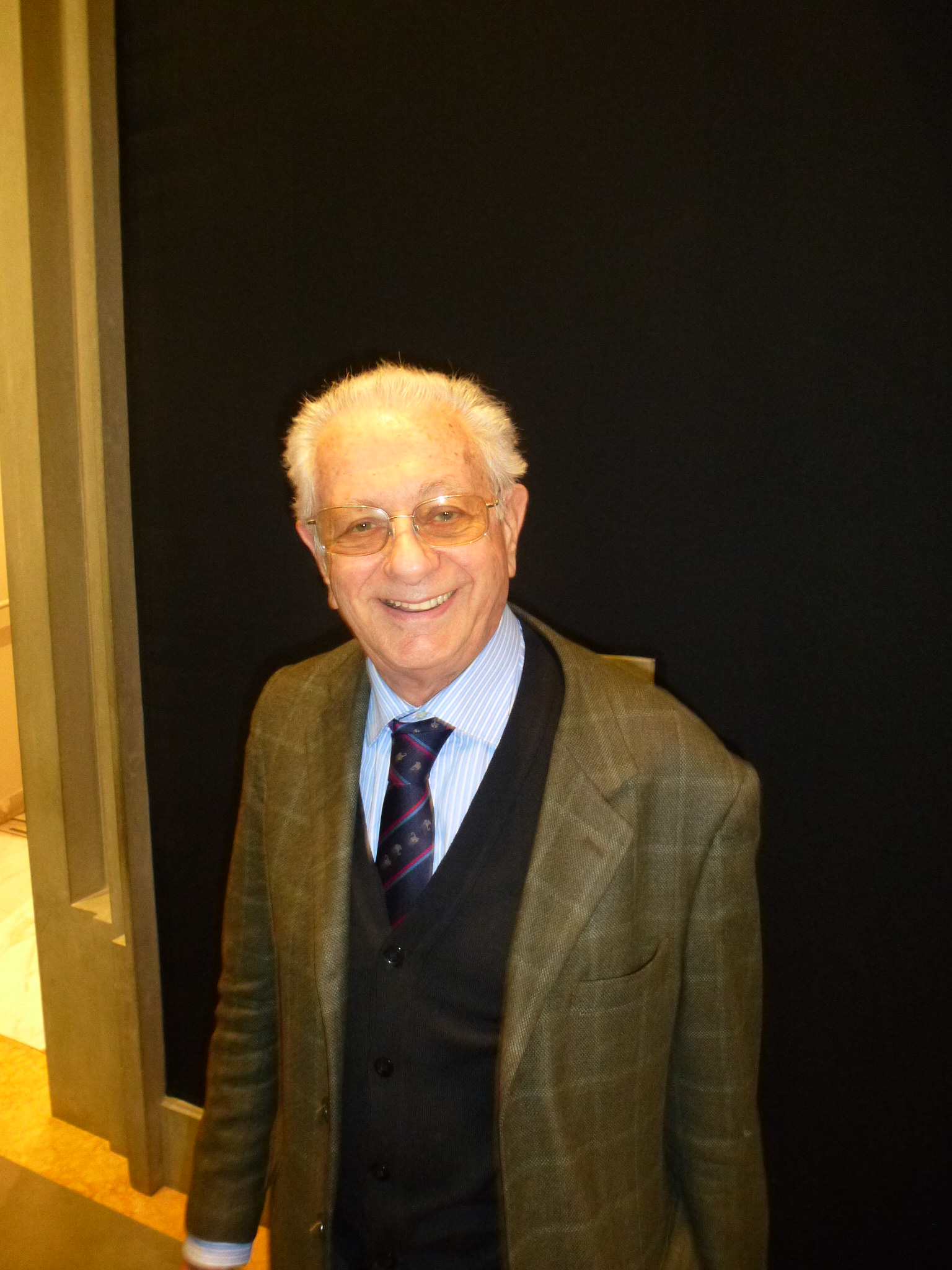

Minister of Education
- In office 18 May 1996 – 26 April 2000
- Prime Minister: Romano Prodi; Massimo D'Alema
- Preceded by: Giancarlo Lombardi
- Succeeded by: Tullio De Mauro
Parliamentary offices
Member of the European Parliament
In office 14 July 2009 – 1 July 2014
Constituency	North-East Italy
Member of the Senate of the Republic
In office 30 May 2001 – 24 July 2002
Constituency	Tuscany
Member of the Chamber of Deputies
In office 15 April 1994 – 29 May 2001
Constituency	Florence
In office 16 May 1963 – 4 June 1968
Constituency	Cagliari

Personal details
- Born: 25 July 1932 Sassari, Kingdom of Italy
- Died: 1 November 2023 (aged 91) Siena, Italy
- Party: PCI (until 1991); PDS (1991–1998); DS (1998–2007); PD (2007–2023)
- Relatives: Sergio Berlinguer (brother); Mario Berlinguer (uncle); Enrico Berlinguer (cousin); Giovanni Berlinguer (cousin); Bianca Berlinguer (first cousin once removed)
- Education: University of Sassari

Luigi Berlinguer (Italian pronunciation: [luˈiːdʒi berliŋˈɡwɛr]; 25 July 1932 – 1 November 2023) was an Italian jurist and politician. He was a professor at the University of Siena, and also served as the minister of university and research and the minister of education.

== Early life and education ==
Berlinguer was born in Sassari, Sardinia, on 25 July 1932. His brother, Sergio Berlinguer, was a diplomat and politician. They were cousins of the Italian Communist Party (PCI) leader Enrico Berlinguer, who died in 1984. He obtained a law degree from the University of Sassari in 1955.

== Career ==
Berlinguer served as mayor of Sennori. He was the rector of the University of Siena from 1985 to 1993, when he was appointed to the Ciampi Cabinet as minister of universities, science, and technology. He was one of the three former PCI members in the cabinet. He served as the minister of education between 1996 and 2000 in the cabinets led first by Romano Prodi and then by Massimo D'Alema. He was also acting minister of universities, science, and technology from 1996 to October 1998. He was succeeded by Ortensio Zecchino as minister. In addition, he served in both the Chamber of Deputies and the Senate of the Republic.

As a member of the Democratic Party, Berlinguer was elected as a member of the European Parliament (MEP) in 2009, sitting as part of the Progressive Alliance of Socialists and Democrats. In the European Parliament, he served as first vice-chair of the committee on legal affairs and as a member of the committee on culture and education beginning in 2009.

== Death ==
Berlinguer died on 1 November 2023, at the age of 91.

== Electoral history ==
Election	House	Constituency	Party	Votes	Result
1963	Chamber of Deputies	Cagliari–Sassari–Nuoro–Oristano	PCI	16,633	Elected
1994	Chamber of Deputies	Florence	PDS	34,218	Elected
1996	Chamber of Deputies	Florence	PDS	40,850	Elected
2001	Senate of the Republic	Tuscany – Pisa	DS	78,361	Elected
2009	European Parliament	North-East Italy	PD	81,464	Elected

== Awards and honours ==
In 2011, Berlinguer received by the European Parliament the MEP award in the field of culture and education.

- Knight Grand Cross Order of Merit of the Italian Republic, 27 December 1992.

== See also ==
- List of members of the European Parliament for Italy, 2009–2014
