= Il disertore =

- Directed by: Giuliana Berlinguer
- Written by: Giuliana Berlinguer; Massimo Felisatti
- Starring: Irene Papas
- Cinematography: Sandro Messina
- Edited by: Romano Trina
- Release date: 1983
- Country: Italy
- Language: Italian

Il disertore (also known as The Deserter) is a 1983 Italian war drama film written and directed by Giuliana Berlinguer. It is based on the novel with the same name by Giuseppe Dessì. It was entered into the competition at the 40th edition of the Venice Film Festival.

== Cast ==
- Irene Papas as Mariangela
- Cristina Maccioni as Pietrina
- Omero Antonutti as Don Coi
- Enrico Pau as Monsignor Pau
- Antonio Cipriato as Roberto Manca
- Salvatore Mossa as Francesco Isalle
- Mattia Sbragia as Saverio
- Isella Orchis as Lica
- Adolfo Lastretti as Urbano Costai
- Franco Noè as Dante Taverna
- Piero Nuti as Alessandro Comina

== See also ==
- List of Italian films of 1983
