= Giuliana Berlinguer =

Italian film director, screenwriter and writer (1933–2014)

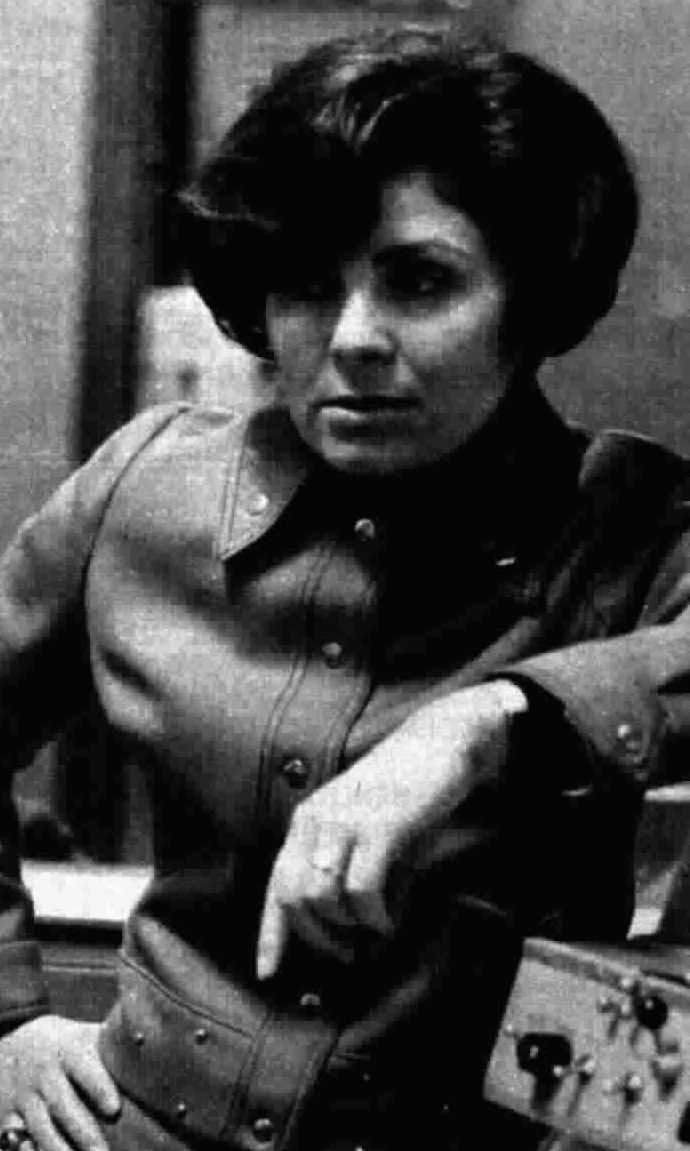
- Giuliana Berlinguer in 1974
- Born: Giuliana Ruggerini; 23 November 1933; Mantua, Kingdom of Italy
- Died: 15 September 2014 (aged 80); Rome, Italy
- Occupation: Director
- Spouse: Giovanni Berlinguer
- Children: 3
- Relatives: Mario Berlinguer (father-in-law); Enrico Berlinguer (brother-in-law); Bianca Berlinguer (niece)
- Awards: Rapallo Carige Prize

Giuliana Berlinguer (Italian pronunciation: [dʒuˈljaːna berliŋˈɡwɛr]; née Ruggerini; 23 November 1933 – 15 September 2014) was an Italian director, screenwriter, and novelist.

== Life and career ==
Born in Mantua, Berlinguer studied at the Silvio d’Amico Academy of Dramatic Arts, where she graduated in stage direction. She later focused on television, directing several RAI TV-movies and series, notably a successful 1969 Nero Wolfe miniseries starring Tino Buazzelli in the title role.

In 1983 she directed the war-drama film Il disertore, which was screened at the Venice Film Festival. She was the wife of Giovanni Berlinguer, the brother of Enrico Berlinguer.
