= Sergio Berlinguer =

Italian diplomat and politician (1934–2021)

Minister for Italians in the World
- In office 10 May 1994 – 17 January 1995
- Prime Minister: Silvio Berlusconi

Personal details
- Born: 6 May 1934 Sassari, Kingdom of Italy
- Died: 17 October 2021 (aged 87) Rome, Italy
- Party: MID (1995-1996); Italian Renewal (1996-2002)
- Relatives: Luigi Berlinguer (brother); Mario Berlinguer (uncle); Enrico Berlinguer (cousin); Giovanni Berlinguer (cousin); Bianca Berlinguer (first cousin once removed)
- Education: Sapienza University of Rome
- Profession: Diplomat

Sergio Berlinguer (Italian pronunciation: [ˈsɛrdʒo berliŋˈɡwɛr]; 6 May 1934 – 17 October 2021) was an Italian diplomat who served as state minister in the first cabinet of Silvio Berlusconi.

== Biography ==
=== Early life and education ===
Berlinguer was born in Sassari on 6 May 1934, younger brother of Luigi Berlinguer and cousin of Enrico Berlinguer. He held a law degree from Sapienza University of Rome.

=== Career ===
Berlinguer began his career at the ministry of foreign affairs in 1959. He headed its press office. He worked at the Italian Embassy in London from 1962 to 1970.. He served as the general manager of the emigration department of the foreign ministry from 1983 to 1985 and was appointed diplomatic advisor to the Italian President Francesco Cossiga in 1985.
Then he became the secretary general and spokesman for the Italian presidency and served in the post until 1992. He was appointed state minister to the first cabinet of Silvio Berlusconi in 1994 and remained in office until 1995. He was also the member of the council of state. In 1996, Berlinguer's movement, Movimento Italiano Democratico (MID), joined Rinnovamento Italiano which in turn was part of the Ulivo coalition for the general elections in 1996.

=== Other roles and death ===
A member of the Italian Aspen Institute, Berlinguer died in Rome on 17 October 2021, at the age of 87.

== Awards and honors ==
Order of Merit of the Italian Republic 1st Class / Knight Grand Cross – 16 January 1988

Order of Pope Saint Sylvester, Vatican.
