= Renzo Trivelli =

Italian politician

Secretary of the Italian Communist Youth Federation
- In office 1956–1960
- Preceded by: Enrico Berlinguer
- Succeeded by: Rino Serri

Member of the European Parliament
- Parliamentary group: COM; GUE / NGL; S & D

Personal details
- Born: 3 May 1925 Livorno, Italy
- Died: 30 November 2015 (aged 90) Rome, Italy
- Party: Italian Communist Party; Democratic Party of the Left

Renzo Trivelli (3 May 1925 – 30 November 2015) was an Italian politician. He was a member of the Italian Communist Party and the Democratic Left Party. In 1956, he succeeded Enrico Berlinguer as leader of the Italian Communist Youth Federation, a position he held until 1960.

He was elected to the European Parliament in 1984, and then re-elected in 1989, to the lists of the PCI. He was vice president of the Delegation for relations with Hungary. After that, he was on the Committee on Development and Cooperation, the Delegation for relations with the Member States of ASEAN and the ASEAN Inter-Parliamentary Organization (AIPO). In 1993, Trivelli became a part of the Delegation to the EC-Turkey Joint Parliamentary Committee. In 1994, Trivelli was elected to the Committee on Foreign Affairs and Security.

Trivelli died on 30 November 2015.
