= National Museum of Villa Guinigi =

Coordinates: 43.8450°N 10.5123°E

- Museo nazionale di Villa Guinigi
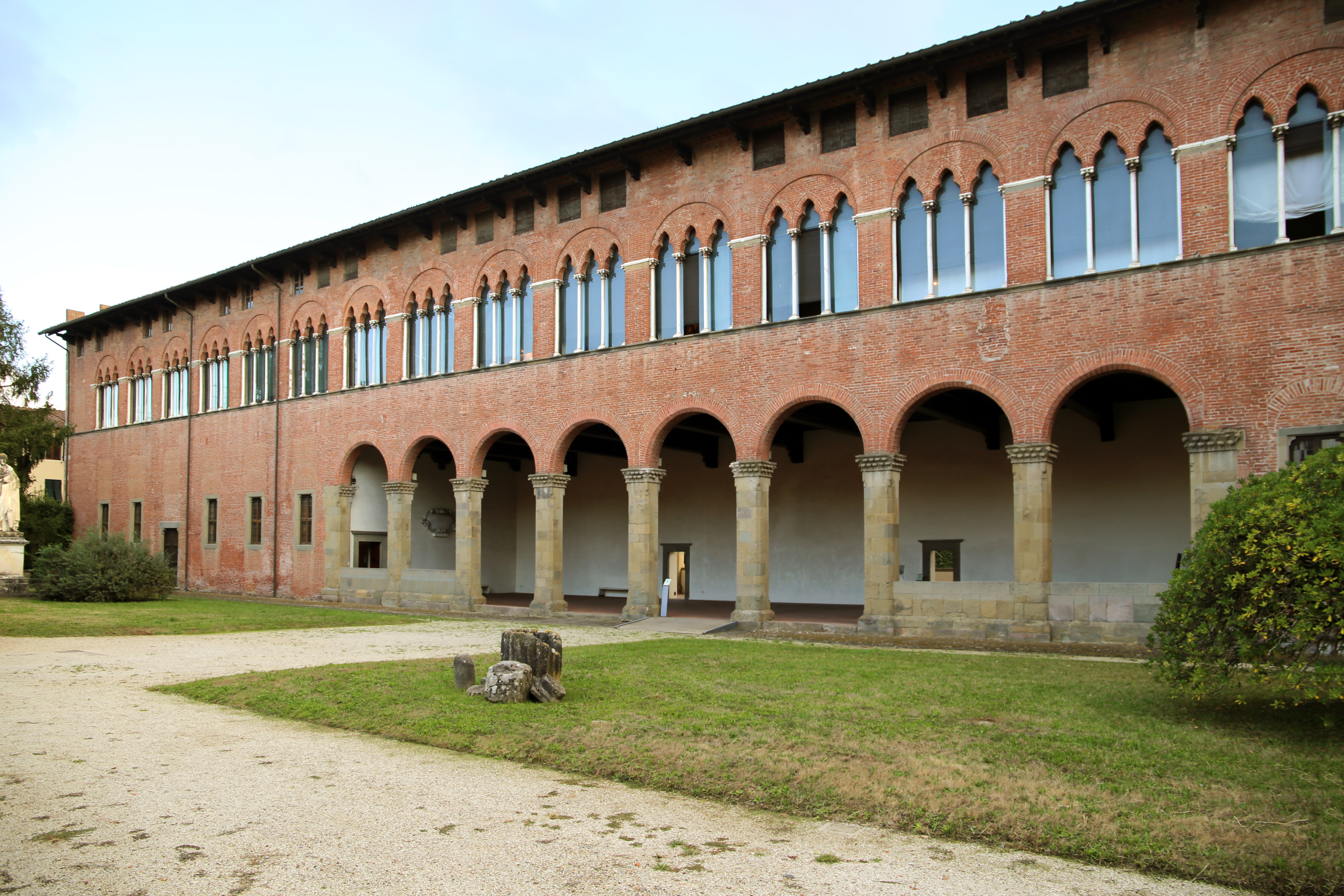
- Museum of Villa Guinigi and its loggia
- Established: 1924
- Location: via della Quarquonia, Lucca, Italy
- Website: www.luccamuseinazionali.it

The Museo Nazionale di Villa Guinigi is the main art museum hosting the pre-modern art collections owned by the city of Lucca, Italy.

The museum is located in a refurbished villa on Via della Quarquonia, completed in 1418 for Paolo Guinigi, ruler of Lucca until 1430. After his death, the building was confiscated by the republic, and it has served various purposes over the years. Only in 1924 was it selected to house the art collection, which until then was housed in the Palazzo Pubblico. In 1948 it was donated to the Italian state, which carried out a more organized preservation campaign and at the same time rearranged the collection, subsequently distributing it between this villa and the Palazzo Mansi.

The late-Gothic building was constructed from 1413 to 1418 as a Villa di Delizia. It has an imposing brick façade with central ground-floor portico. Once elaborately decorated by Guinigi, it now houses collections of mainly the ancient, medieval, renaissance, baroque, and neoclassic periods.

== Gallery ==
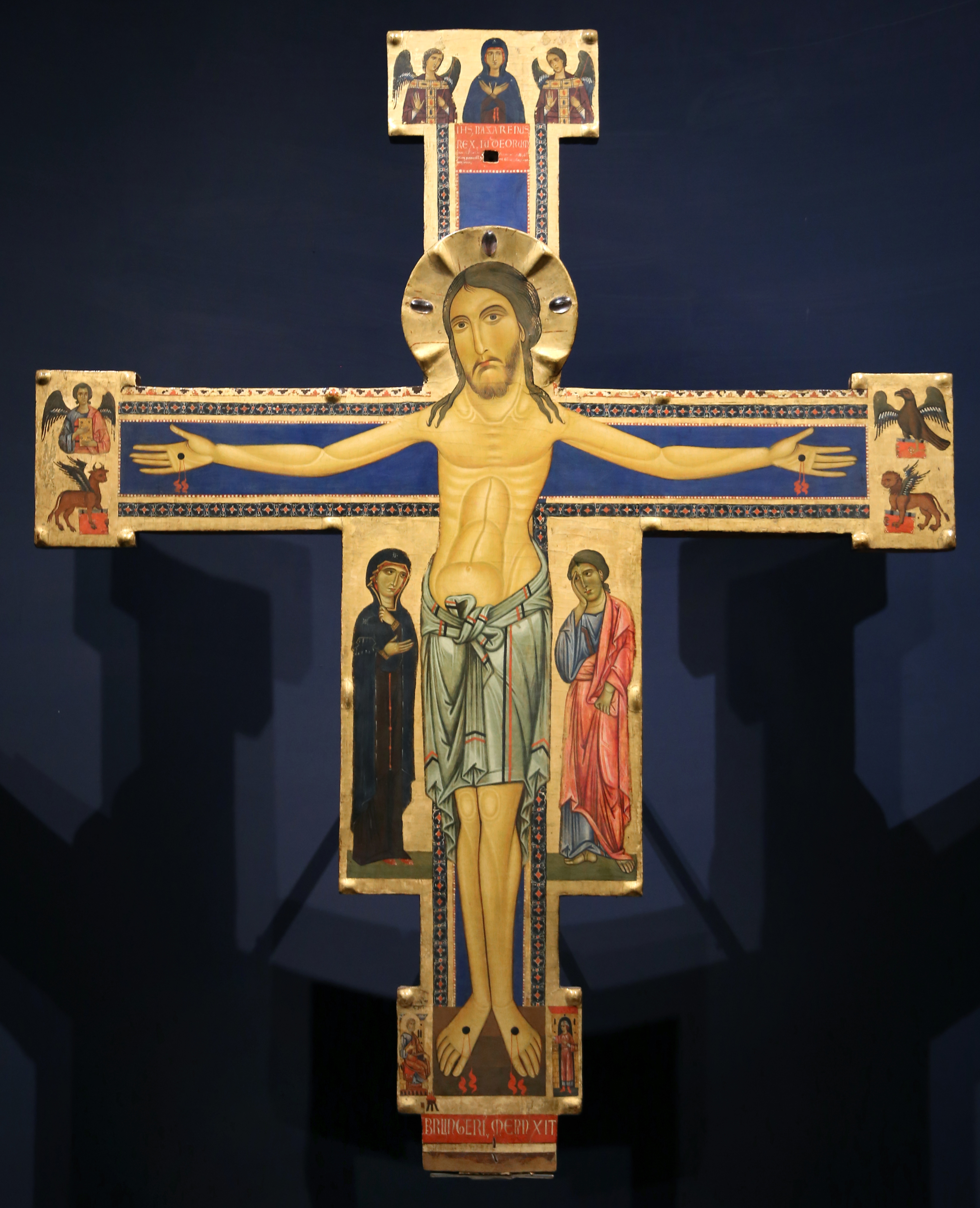
Berlinghiero Berlinghieri:
Crucifix, ca. 1220.

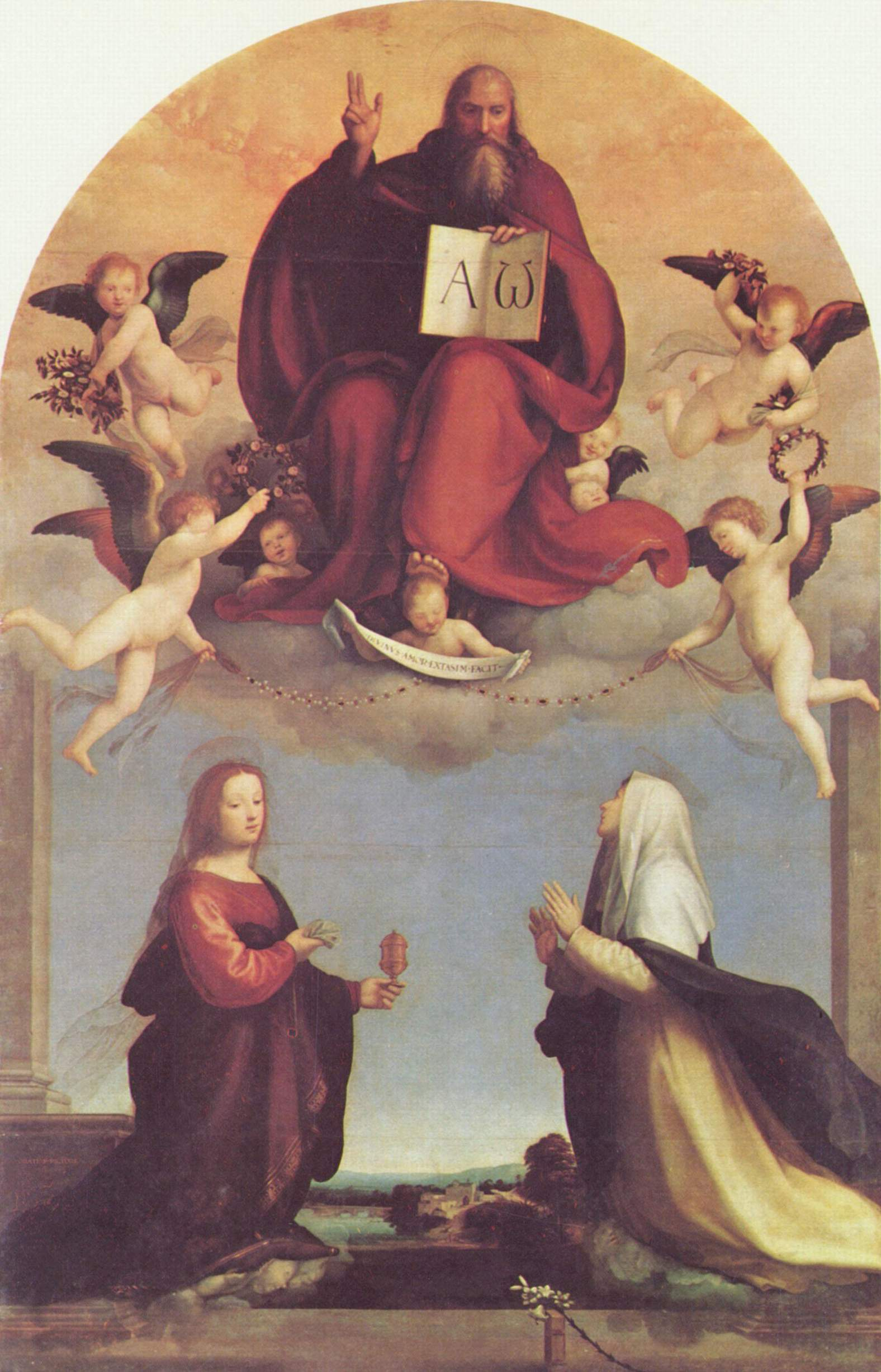
Fra Bartolomeo:
God the Father with Sts Catherine of Siena and Mary Magdalen, 1508
