= Bianca Berlinguer =

Italian journalist

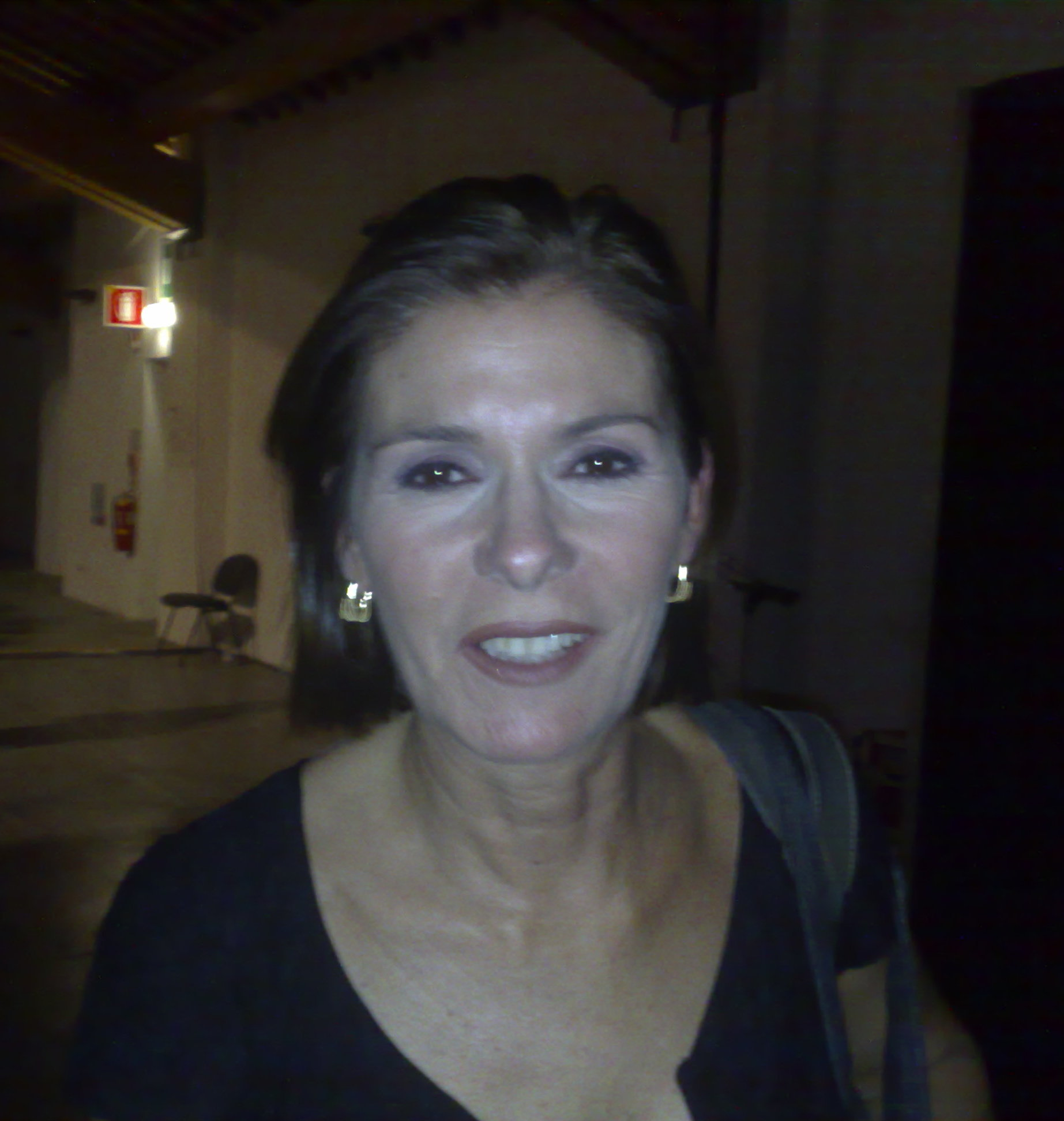
- Berlinguer in 2008
- Born: Bianca Maria Berlinguer; December 9, 1959 (age 66); Rome, Italy
- Occupations: Journalist; news anchor
- Spouse: Stefano Marroni (div. 1995)
- Partner: Luigi Manconi (1997–present)
- Children: 1
- Parents: Enrico Berlinguer (father); Letizia Laurenti (mother)
- Relatives: Mario Berlinguer (grandfather); Giovanni Berlinguer (uncle); Giuliana Berlinguer (aunt); Luigi Berlinguer (first cousin once removed); Sergio Berlinguer (first cousin once removed)

Bianca Maria Berlinguer (Italian pronunciation: [ˈbjaŋka berliŋˈɡwɛr]; born 9 December 1959) is an Italian journalist and former news anchor. She was the director of TG3 from October 2009 to August 2016.

== Biography ==
Berlinguer is the first of the four children of the Italian Communist Party leader Enrico Berlinguer and Letizia Laurenti (the other siblings are Maria Stella, Marco and Laura, journalist of Studio Aperto). She is divorced from Stefano Marroni and since 1997 she has been in a relationship with the politician Luigi Manconi, who is the father of her daughter Giulia (b. 1998).

She holds a degree in literature from Sapienza University of Rome and after a period of training at Radiocorriere TV, at the beginning of the 1980s she started working at Il Messaggero and at the same time worked at Mixer (1985) as an editor. She later joined the TG3 newsroom on a permanent basis. She presented the TG3 evening edition uninterruptedly from 1991 to 5 August 2016, when she was succeeded by Luca Mazzà. She had also been the director of TG3 since 12 October 2009 and she presented Primo piano, an in-depth programme on Rai 3. Between 7 November 2016 and 2023, she presented the programme Cartabianca on Rai 3.

On 24 September 2010 she won the first edition of the journalism prize "L'isola che c'è", awarded to 10 Sardinian journalists working in Rome for the printed press or the RAI. On 24 September 2011 she won the Premio Nazionale Alghero Donna di Letteratura e Giornalismo, journalism section. As director she continues to lead (after a gap of some months) the evening edition of TG3, and the in-depth programme Linea Notte.

In 2019 she published her first book, a biography on her long time friend Marcella Di Folco (died 2010), who was a character actor with Federico Fellini and a transgender activist, titled Storia di Marcella che fu Marcello. The book was finalist at the Premio Caccuri 2020.
