= Barone Berlinghieri =

Italian painter (1228–1282)

Barone Berlinghieri (fl. 1228–1282) was an Italian painter. He was the son of Berlingherus from Milan who was still living in 1250. He executed several painted crucifixes; among others one for the Pieve of Casabasciano in 1254; and another in 1284 for Sant' Alessandro Maggiore at Lucca. He was the brother of Bonaventura and Marco Berlinghieri.
