= Giovanni Berlinguer =

Italian politician, humanist, and professor of social medicine (1924–2015)

Giovanni Berlinguer OMRI
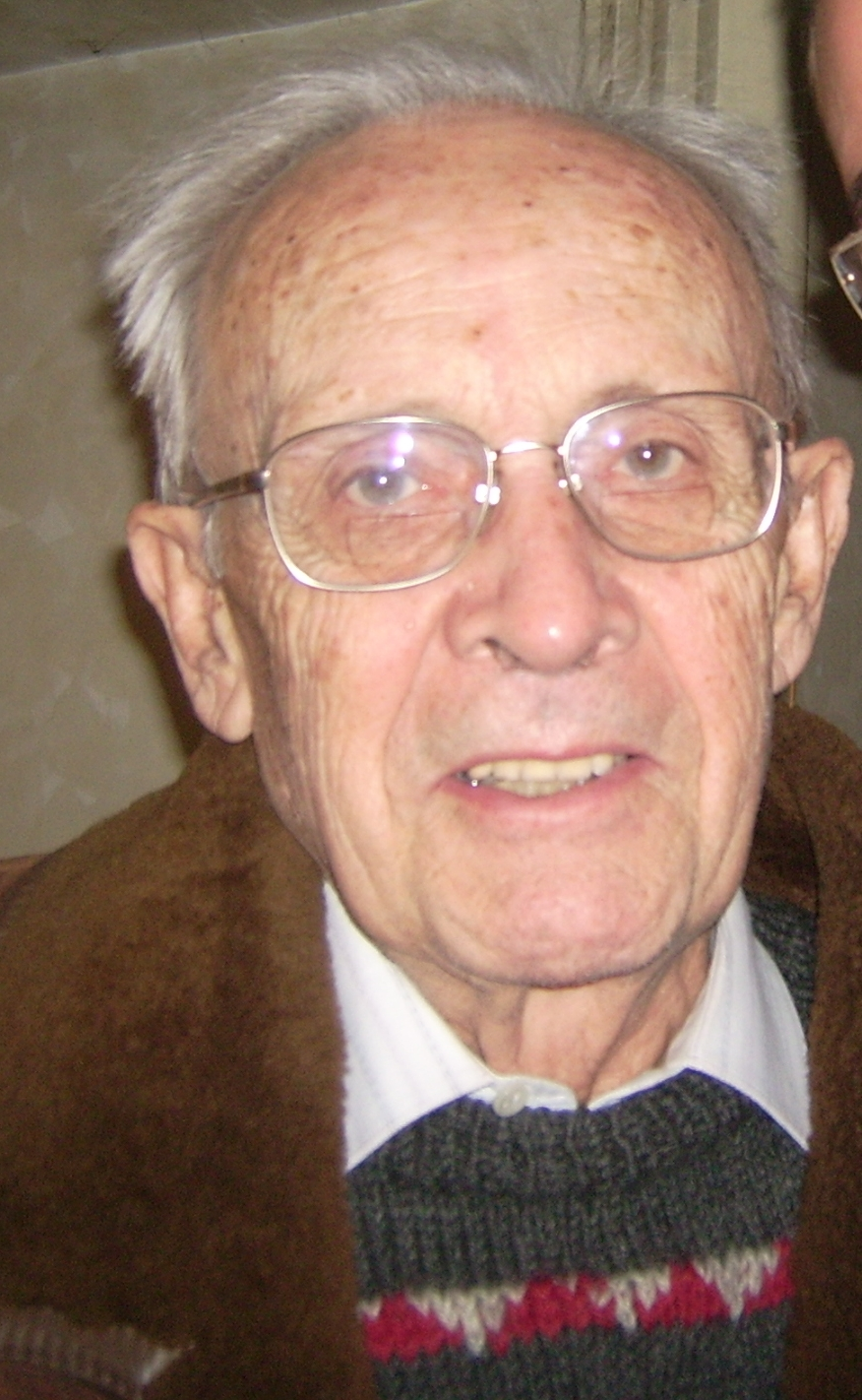
- Berlinguer in 2008

Member of the European Parliament
- In office 20 July 2004 – 13 July 2009
- Constituency: North-East Italy

Member of the Senate of the Republic
- In office 12 July 1983 – 22 April 1992
- Constituency: Iglesias (1983–1987); Livorno (1987–1992)

Member of the Chamber of Deputies
- In office 25 May 1972 – 11 July 1983
- Constituency: Cagliari–Sassari–Nuoro–Oristano

Personal details
- Born: 9 July 1924 Sassari, Kingdom of Italy
- Died: 6 April 2015 (aged 90) Rome, Italy
- Party: PCI (1944–1991); PDS (1991–1998); DS (1998–2007); SD (2007–2010)
- Other political affiliations: Party of European Socialists
- Spouse: Giuliana Ruggerini (died 2014)
- Children: 3
- Parent: Mario Berlinguer (father)
- Relatives: Enrico Berlinguer (brother); Bianca Berlinguer (niece); Luigi Berlinguer (cousin); Sergio Berlinguer (cousin)
- Profession: University professor

Giovanni Berlinguer (Italian: [dʒoˈvanni berliŋˈɡwɛr]; 9 July 1924 – 6 April 2015) was an Italian politician, humanist, and professor of social medicine.

== Life and career ==
Giovanni Berlinguer was born in Sassari, Sardinia, the son of Mario Berlinguer. A physician and professor of public health, he first worked in social medicine at the University of Sassari (1969–1974) and then in occupational health at the Sapienza University of Rome (1975–1999). Like his brother Enrico, he was a major figure in the Italian Communist Party (PCI) and was elected to the Chamber of Deputies in 1972, 1976, and 1979, and to the Senate of the Republic in 1983 and 1987. He ran for secretary of the Democrats of the Left (DS) in 2001 but was defeated by Piero Fassino 61.8% to 34.1%. From 2004 to 2009, Berlinguer was a member of the European Parliament representing the DS and sat with the Party of European Socialists group. At the convening of the European Parliament on 20 July 2004, he was found to be the oldest member, and as such presided over the parliament during the election of Josep Borrell Fontelles in 2004 and Hans-Gert Pöttering in 2007 as the president of the European Parliament.

Berlinguer was in charge of the first National Health Plan in the context of the Economic Development Program adopted by the Italian Parliament in 1968. He was also a member of the National Health Council between 1994 and 1996, and vice-chairman (1992–1995) and chairman (1999–2001) of the National Bioethics Committee (CNB). He was a member of the UNESCO International Bioethics Committee (2001–2007) and of the Commission on the Social Determinants of Health, as well as of the World Health Organisation. He was rapporteur on the first project, held in 2003, of the UNESCO "Universal Declaration on Bioethics".

In the years of his chairmanship, the CNB strategy underwent some noteworthy changes. Priority was no longer given to frontier bioethics but to its link with everyday bioethics, which Berlinguer articulated in his 2000 book Bioetica quotidiana (Everyday Bioethics). This change implied that the CNB opinions were open to contributions not only of specialists but also of lay people, and new channels of communication were established with the public at large. The democratic guidance had comments and a significant impact at the local, national, and international level.

Berlinguer died in Rome at the age of 90.

== Electoral history ==
Election	House	Constituency	Party	Votes	Result
1972	Chamber of Deputies	Cagliari–Sassari–Nuoro–Oristano	PCI	42,233	Elected
1976	Chamber of Deputies	Cagliari–Sassari–Nuoro–Oristano	PCI	62,057	Elected
1979	Chamber of Deputies	Cagliari–Sassari–Nuoro–Oristano	PCI	78,803	Elected
1983	Senate of the Republic	Sardinia – Iglesias	PCI	44,202	Elected
1987	Senate of the Republic	Tuscany – Livorno	PCI	105,142	Elected
2004	European Parliament	North-East Italy	DS	149,431	Elected

== Honors ==
- Cavaliere di Gran Croce OMRI, 1999.
- Medaglia d'oro ai benemeriti della cultura e dell'arte, 2001.
- Doctorat honoris causa, Université de Montréal, 1996; and University of Brasília, 1999.

== See also ==
- 2004 European Parliament election in Italy
- Father of the House in the European Union
