= Béranger =

Béranger or Beranger is a French surname that may refer to

- Clara Beranger (1886–1956), American screenwriter
- Christine Béranger-Goitschel (born 1944), French alpine skier
- François Béranger (1937–2003), French singer
- George Beranger (1893–1973), Australian actor and film director
- Grégory Béranger (born 1981), French football player
- Paul Béranger, French discus thrower
- Pierre-Jean de Béranger (1780–1857), French poet and songwriter

== See also ==
- Bérenger
