= Bonaventura Berlinghieri =

Italian painter

External videos
- Berlinghieri's St. Francis Altarpiece, Smarthistory

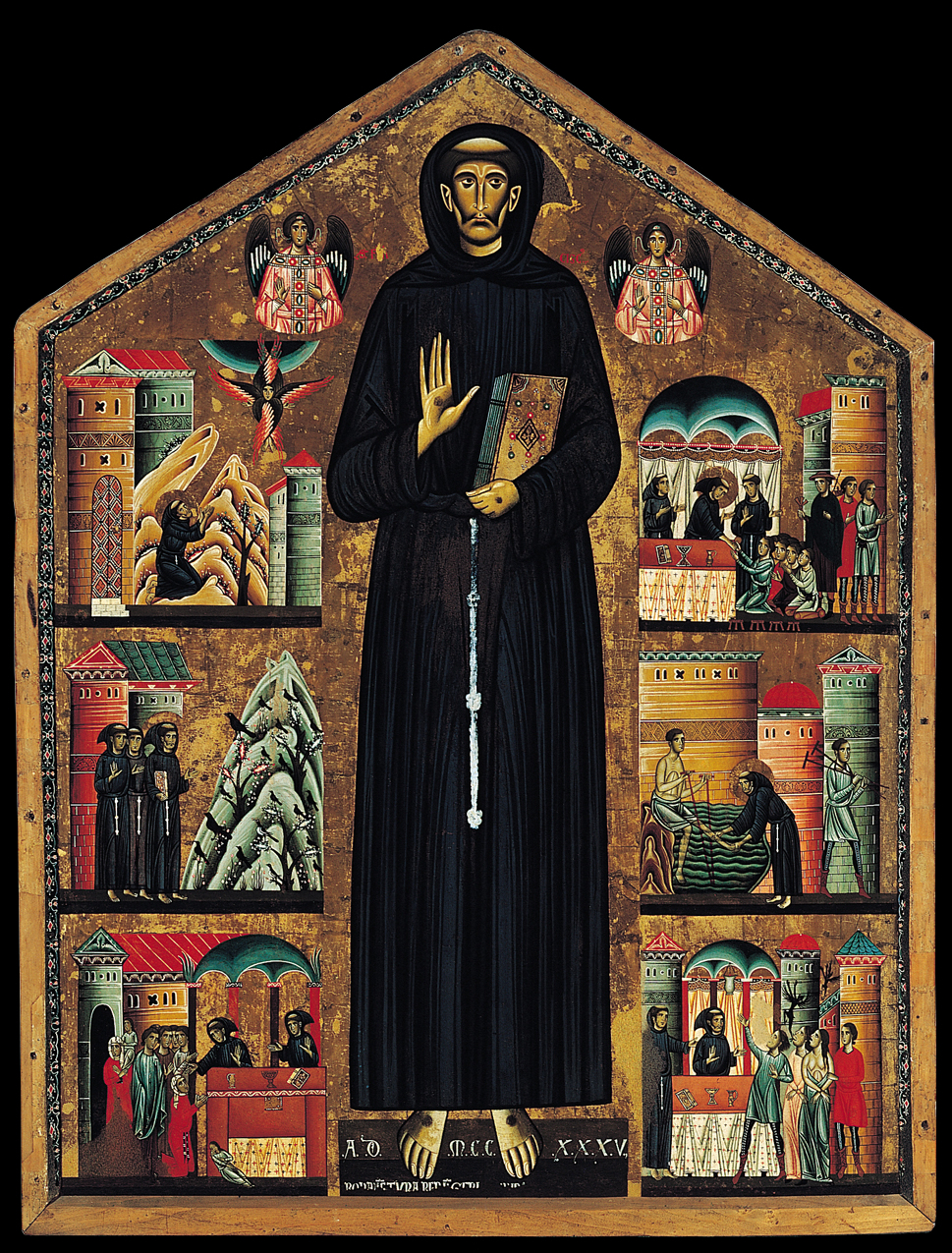
Bonaventura Berlinghieri, Saint Francis of Assisi, 1235

Bonaventura Berlinghieri (fl. 1235–1244) was an Italian painter from Lucca, of the Gothic period. He was son of painter Berlinghiero Berlinghieri and brother of Barone and Marco Berlinghieri.

Bonaventura painted several panels and wall-paintings at Lucca, in 1235 and 1244. He is most famous for an altarpiece dedicated to the life of Francis of Assisi. This altarpiece is painted in tempera on wood panel in the Italo-Byzantine or maniera greca style. It depicts the stigmata as well as several scenes from the saint's life. The altarpiece, sometimes referenced as the Pescia Work, is credited with being one of the first iconographic depiction of the narrative of St. Francis of Assisi's life. This altarpiece is housed in the Church of San Francesco of Pescia where it can be seen today.

The Via B. Berlinghieri in Lucca is named after the family.
