= Marco Berlinghieri =

Italian painter (1232–1255)

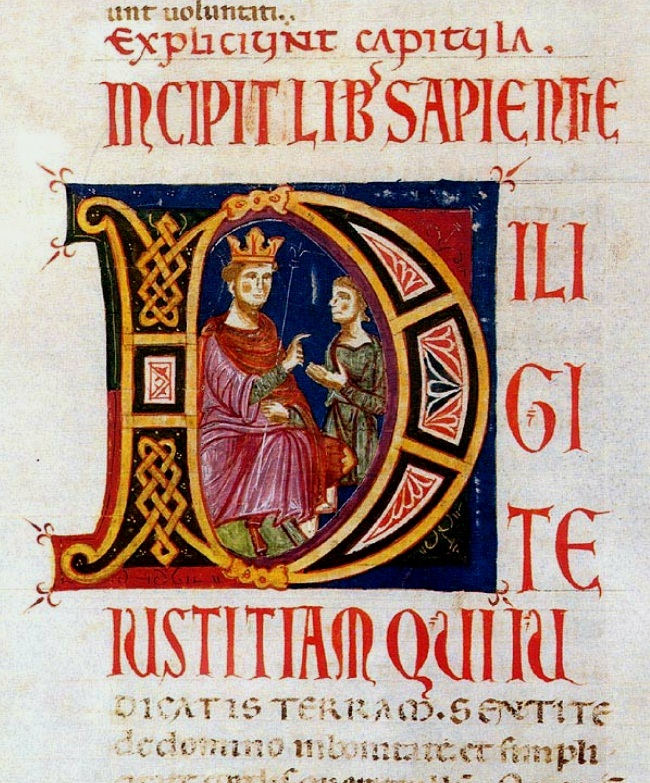
A page from Berlinghieri's illuminated Bible (1248–50)

Marco Berlinghieri (fl. 1232–1255) was an Italian medieval miniature painter and book illuminator who executed an illuminated Bible, finished in 1250. He was the son of Berlinghiero Berlinghieri and the brother of Barone and Bonaventura Berlinghieri.
