= Berlinghiero =

Italian painter

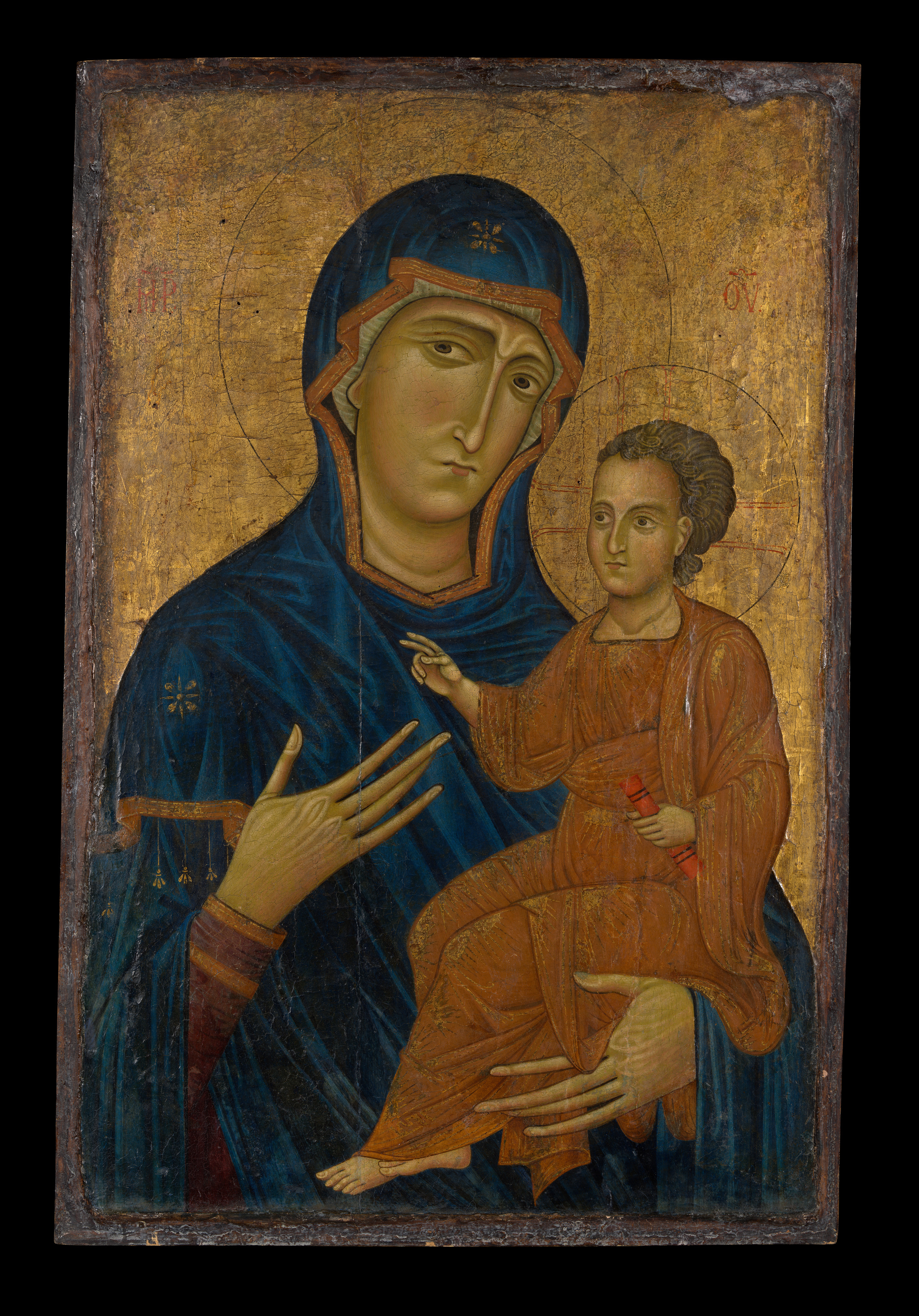
Madonna and child, c. 1230, tempera on wood, now at the Metropolitan Museum of Art

Berlinghiero, also as Berlinghiero Berlinghieri or Berlinghiero of Lucca (fl. 1228 – between 1236 and 1242), was an Italian painter in the Italo-Byzantine style of the early thirteenth century. He was the father of the painters Barone Berlinghieri, Bonaventura Berlinghieri, and Marco Berlinghieri.

His actual name is unknown, as he is known from the inscription "Berlingerius me pinxit" on the crucifix which is the basis of attributing other works to the name. The form "Berlinghiero Berlinghieri", once common in art history, is certainly not his name according to Edward B. Garrison and most recent sources, however, his commonly accepted name is still Berlinghiero. He is also mentioned in a parchment dated March 22, 1228, among the names of the residents of Lucca who swore to keep the peace with Pisa after a five-year war. The original document has been lost since the mid-19th century and only a somewhat garbled 17th-century transcription exists today, giving rise to the mistaken interpretation of attributing him an incorrect name and an incorrect Lombardic origin.

Since his two adult sons were also mentioned in that document, it can be argued that Berlinghiero was then between 35 and 40 years old. This puts his birthday in the year 1175, and his death in the year 1236.

== Style and works ==
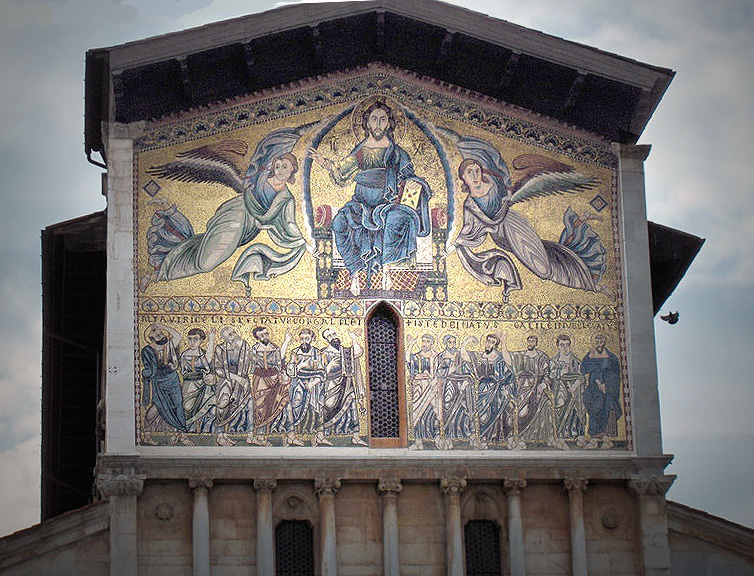
Mosaic at the facade of the Basilica di San Frediano in Lucca

His art style was late Romanesque, mainly line-based, with neohellenistic and Byzantine influences. He is considered to be one of the main artists of the Tuscan art of the period. He is also one of the few artists who painted in what is considered the Italo-Byzantine style to whom work can be attributed with certainty, though distinguishing his work from that of his sons is sometimes difficult.

His earliest work, or at least that attributed to him, is the "Madonna di sotto gli organi" in the Cathedral of Pisa and dates no earlier than 1210.

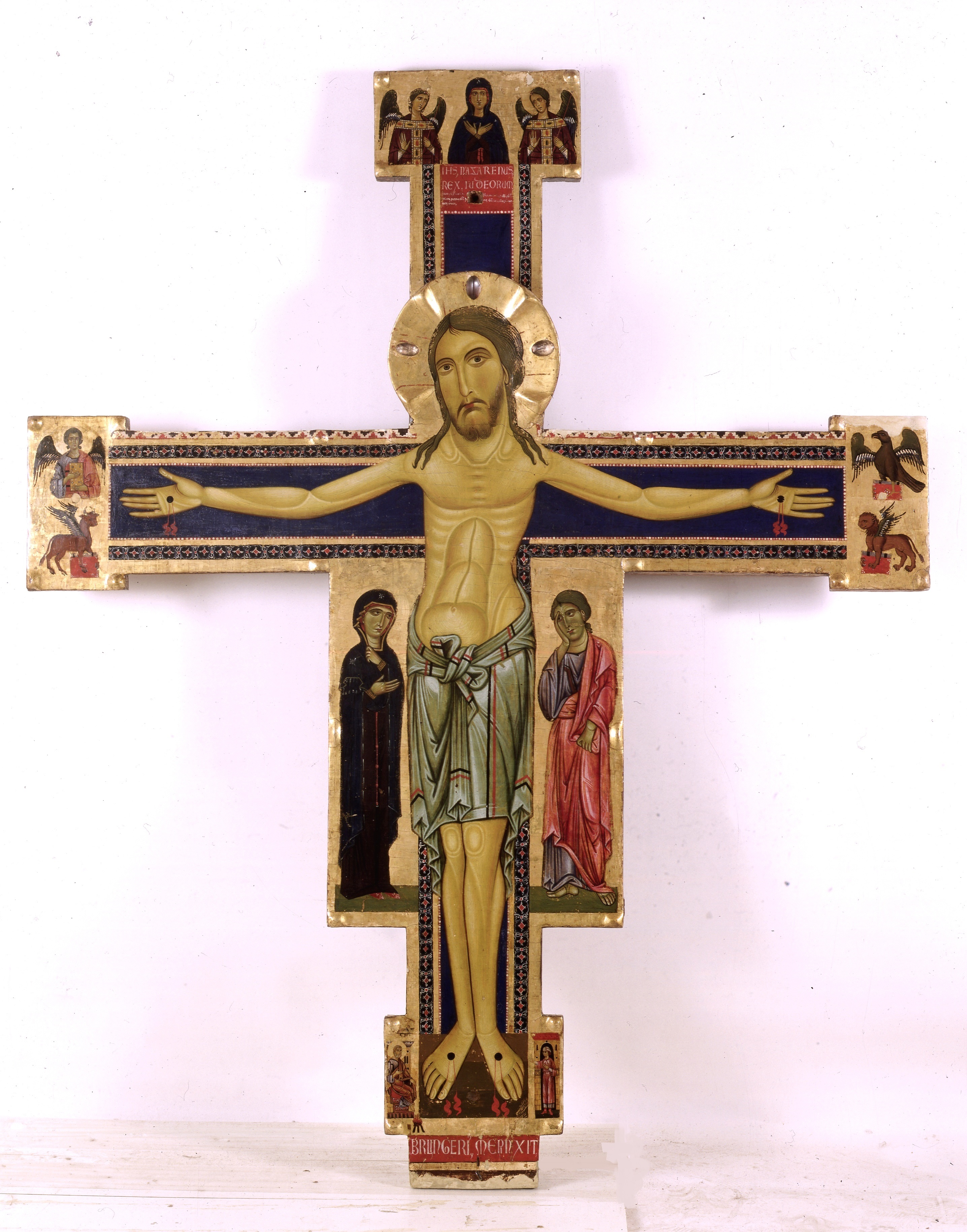
Crucifix, ca. 1220, now at the National Museum of Villa Guinigi in Lucca

One of his more famous works, Madonna and Child, is now on display at the Metropolitan Museum of Art. It exemplifies several key elements that typify it as quintessentially Byzantine, but it also contains later Italian elements. One can begin with the most recognizable attributes, for example, the halos, the flat and uncrowded gold background, and the blue and red robes of the Virgin and her long features. The golden background and halos surrounding the heads of the Virgin and Child are common in the Byzantine representation of divine or holy figures, as are the colours used throughout the composition. These golden halos differ between the two figures in the painting—Christ's is articulated by an inlaid cruciform to distinguish his divine status. The Madonna boasts timeless stylized features of the Virgin. Her fingers, nose, and neck are exaggeratedly long and slender and her face itself is elongated and narrow. Her soulful eyes are large and intensely focused, lending her visage a particular elegance. Upon seeing the painting in person, one can observe a red tint in the cheeks of both Jesus and Mary that gives the flesh a lifelike quality—more vivacious, in fact, than its Byzantine predecessors. The particular depth created by the shading of the faces, Mary's in particular—an attribute of early Italian painting—also gives it an air of naturalism that Byzantine figures often lacked.

Works by Berlinghieri can be found at the San Matteo National Museum in Pisa, the National Museum of Villa Guinigi in Lucca, the church of Santa Maria Assunta in Villa Basilica near Lucca, the North Carolina Museum of Art in Raleigh, the Cleveland Museum of Art, and the Metropolitan Museum of Art in New York City.
