= Mario Berlinguer =

Italian politician (1891–1969)

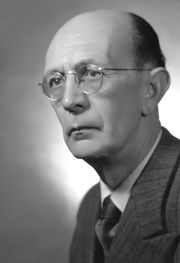
Berlinguer in 1948

Mario Berlinguer (Italian: [ˈmaːrjo berliŋˈɡwɛr]; 29 August 1891 – 5 September 1969) was an Italian lawyer and politician.

== Early life and family ==
Born on 29 August 1891 in Sassari, Sardinia, Kingdom of Italy, Berlinguer descended from a noble Sardinian family of Catalan origins. Like many of his ancestors, he belonged to the Italian Freemasonry and was Great Master (33rd Scottish Rite Mason) of the regular lodge of Sassari, affiliated to the Grand Orient of Italy. He was the father of politicians Enrico and Giovanni Berlinguer.

== Political career and later life ==
The young Berlinguer was a follower of the Meridionalist activist Gaetano Salvemini. After his graduation in law, he collaborated with the newspaper La Nuova Sardegna and other Italian newspapers. Berlinguer was elected to the Italian Chamber of Deputies in 1924. The following year, he founded the clandestine newspaper Sardegna libera (Free Sardinia), which attracted him the hostility of the Italian fascist regime. His sister, Ines, was among the anti-fascist figures and was married to Stefano Siglienti.

After the armistice with Italy (September 1943), he joined the Action Party. For the latter, Berlinguer was a member of the second Badoglio government formed by Pietro Badoglio in southern Italy; as Deputy High Commissioner in charge of prosecuting Fascist crimes, on August 22, 1944, he submitted a request to the Senate for the records of the De Bono trial, in order to reopen the case concerning the assassination of Giacomo Matteotti.

In 1945, Berlinguer was named to the Consulta Nazionale and collaborated to the elaboration of the special regional status for Sardinia. He was a deputy for the Italian Socialist Party from 1948 to 1953. He was the father of Giovanni and Enrico Berlinguer, both of whom were outstanding members of the Italian Communist Party. He died in Rome on 5 September 1969 at the age of 78.

== See also ==
- Berlinguer
