= Amintore Galli =

Italian music publisher and composer (1845–1919)

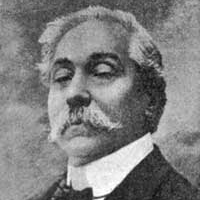
- Born: Amyntor Flaminio Claudio Galli; 12 October 1845; Perticara or Talamello, Legation of Forlì, Papal States
- Died: 8 December 1919 (aged 74); Rimini, Emilia-Romagna, Kingdom of Italy
- Burial place: Monumental Cemetery of Rimini
- Monuments: Amintore Galli Theatre
- Education: Milan Conservatory
- Occupations: Music journalist; Composer; Musicologist
- Known for: Casa Musicale Sonzogno; Workers' Hymn
- Children: 1

Amyntor "Amintore" Flaminio Claudio Galli (12 October 1845 – 8 December 1919) was an Italian music publisher, journalist, historian, musicologist, and composer.

Born in the Marecchia valley, Galli was educated under Alberto Mazzucato at the Milan Conservatory. In 1874, he became artistic director of Edoardo Sonzogno's new Casa Musicale Sonzogno, for which he directed several magazines. Galli distinguished Sonzogno by publishing renowned operas at affordable prices, and under his direction, it became one of Italy's leading musical publishing houses. He translated several librettos and wrote original recitatives. As Director of Il teatro illustrato, Galli oversaw Sonzogno's musical competitions, the second of which notably produced Cavalleria rusticana by his former pupil Pietro Mascagni, to whom Galli was particularly close.

Between 1878 and 1903, Galli was Chair of Counterpoint and Musical Aesthetics at the Milan Conservatory. Galli's students included Ruggero Leoncavallo, Umberto Giordano, Marco Enrico Bossi, Giacomo Puccini, and Francesco Cilea. He wrote multiple influential essays and treatises on musicology and music history, which are still studied in many Italian music schools today.

Despite his illustrious career as a publisher, journalist, and academic, Galli's operatic compositions received cool receptions, and only two were ever performed in his lifetime. Galli is credited with composing the music of Filippo Turati's Workers' Hymn, a popular socialist anthem that was banned by successive governments. Galli died in Rimini in 1919. In May 1947, the city's semi-destroyed Victor Emmanuel II Theatre was renamed in his honour.

== Early life and education ==
Galli was born on 12 October 1845. His place of birth is contested between Perticara and Talamello, neighbouring villages near Novafeltria, in the Marecchia valley of the present-day Province of Rimini. Galli's birth deed records that he was baptised in Talamello – Perticara's church did not have a baptismal font – but his parents are recorded as living in Perticara. Galli's parents were Antonio Galli and Livia Signorini; his father was an architect employed at the sulphur mines, contracted by the mine's new management to reactivate production following the failure of the previous management company. Galli's two sisters, Eroteide and Ezifola, and brother, Claudio, died soon after their births.

Though his parents wished him to study architecture or mathematics, Galli began his musical studies with his uncle, Pio, in Rimini; Pio was the director of the band in Talamello.

After graduating from Rimini's Lyceum, in 1862, he enrolled in the Milan Conservatory. He was a pupil of Alberto Mazzucato, with whom he studied composition and the history of aesthetics and music. Galli was a contemporary of Arrigo Boito, and was introduced to the Scapigliatura artistic environment. While in Milan, Galli composed the aria Cesare al Rubicone to be performed in Rimini's Victor Emmanuel II Theatre in 1864 and 1865. In 1866, Galli enlisted with Boito, Franco Faccio, and Emilio Praga in Giuseppe Garibaldi's army, fighting in the Battle of Bezzecca.

In 1867, Galli graduated from the Milan Conservatory with the cantata Espiazione. For this cantata, he obtained the Conservatory's grand prize for composition. After graduating from the Milan Conservatory, he moved to Amelia, Umbria, where he became the director of a band.

From 1871 to 1873, Galli lived in Finale Emilia, where he directed the city band and the town's music school. Four of his band arrangements of compositions by great masters were performed in Finale Emilia.

== Casa Sonzogno ==
Galli's association with Edoardo Sonzogno began in 1869, when he became editor of Sonzogno's musical magazine Euterpe. By the time he returned to Milan in 1874, Galli had become a musical critic in Sonzogno's Il Secolo, one of Italy's most widely circulated newspapers, renowned for its radical, democratic, and republican tendencies. Its other contributors included Felice Cavallotti.

In 1874, Sonzogno opened a musical establishment, the Casa Musicale Sonzogno, of which Galli became artistic director, tied to Sonzogno's publishing house, Casa Sonzogno. Galli sought to establish an editorial line distinct from those of Casa Ricordi and Francesco Lucca, his closest competitors, by publishing, in Galli's words, "a collection of economically priced masterworks by the great maestri". The first instalment of Il teatro musicale giocoso, one such series, offered the piano sheet music of Gioachino Rossini's The Barber of Seville for one lira. Galli wrote many piano reductions himself, as well as prefaces and explanatory notes. With his help, Sonzogno's publishing house acquired the rights to many foreign operettas, especially French. Thus, Galli translated many French opera librettos, including those of Hervé, Charles Lecocq, and Jacques Offenbach; his most sensational purchase was of Georges Bizet's Carmen in 1879. Galli would often set recitatives to music which originally had no accompaniment.

Between 1878 and 1903, while working for Sonzogno, Galli was appointed to his former teacher's Chair of Counterpoint and Musical Aesthetics at the Milan Conservatory. Among his pupils were Ruggero Leoncavallo, Pietro Mascagni, Umberto Giordano, Marco Enrico Bossi, Giacomo Puccini, and Francesco Cilea. Galli would acquire the works of his pupils, such as Leoncavallo's Pagliacci, Mascagni's L'amico Fritz, and Giordano's Andrea Chénier and Fedora; these works were performed in Milanese theatres, including La Scala, Santa Radegonda, and Canobbiana, which Sonzogno had specially purchased. Mascagni was particularly attached to Galli, who also wrote piano reductions for five of his other operas (I Rantzau, Guglielmo Ratcliff, Silvano, Zanetto, and Le Maschere).

In 1882, Galli became director of two of Sonzogno's periodicals: La musica populare, which he left in 1885, and Il teatro illustrato, which he left in 1892. In his latter capacity, Galli commissioned Sonzogno's four musical competitions, together with Amilcare Ponchielli and Giovanni Sgambati. Notably, in the second competition, advertised in July 1888 and judged by a panel including Galli and Antonio Ghislanzoni, Mascagni's Cavalleria rusticana won first prize against seventy-two other operas.

Galli left the direction of Casa Sonzogno in 1904, though he was secretary of the committee judging its 1905 compositional competition. Evaluating his directorship, some critics reproach Galli for his inability to identify operatic successes, leading them to rivalling publishing houses, such as Andrea Chénier, which Galli described as "unrepresentable", while Puccini's Le Villi was disqualified from Sonzogno's first competition, advertised in July 1888, for submitting an illegible manuscript.

== Essays ==
Galli wrote multiple essays and treatises on musicology and music history, known to have inspired artists such as Filippo Marchetti, Carlo Pedrotti and Pietro Platania. His essays are still read in many Italian music schools.

As a musical historian, Galli sought to move away from biographical historiography, represented in the methods of François-Joseph Fétis, to a framework reconstructing the evolution of musical language. While he was therefore closer to the chronological approach of F. Clement, Galli's essay La musica ed i musicisti (Milan, 1871) criticised how it insufficiently incorporated aesthetic-philosophical values in the creation of music, and his essay Appello al buon senso (Venice, n.d.) advocated linking the evolution of musical language to its environmental and cultural conditioning. Galli concerned himself with identifying the values that inform music's creation, reflecting on Kantian philosophy in his Estetica della musica (Turin, 1900), in which he describes music as "a plastic audible arising from the idealisation of multiple states of feeling".

In Alberto Mazzucato, cenni commemorativi (Milan, 1897), Galli decried the "artistic perversion" presented in the "descriptive music" of composers who avoided melodies such as Jean-François Le Sueur and Hector Berlioz.

Galli's manuscripts are preserved in Rimini's Biblioteca Civica Gambalunga, including his last three essays, which he did not complete before his death: one on the 1600s and 1700s in Italian music; one on the precursors of musical aesthetics from Dante Alighieri to Giuseppe Mazzini; and one on singing in drama.

== Musical composition ==
=== Operatic works ===
Galli was mostly famous for his music journalism and essays; his compositions received limited success, with cool receptions. Only two operas ever made it to the stage: the operetta Il corno d’oro or Un’avventura nel serraglio, and Davide. Il corno d’oro premiered in Turin's Teatro Balbo on 30 August 1876, and was later performed in Barcelona; a September 1876 review in La Stampa noted that its third performance at the Ballbo was "reviewed and corrected in its argument in many places, and it is thanks to these cuts and these corrections that some pieces of the opera, instead of passing unobserved, were welcomed with some applause. The theatre was not very lively." Davide premiered in Milan's Teatro Lirico on 12 November 1904, where it was coldly received by critics. In January 1907, it was staged as part of the fiftieth anniversary celebrations of Rimini's Victor Emmanuel II Theatre.

Among Galli's last compositions was Missa pacis (1919), which was performed on 14 September 1919 in Rimini's Church of San Giovanni Battista, directed by Augusto Massari, during a solemn ceremony for the conclusion of the First World War. Following Galli's death, music critic Vito Fedeli wrote of the piece:

The Mass is an excellent, magnificent work, worthy in every way of the superior mind that conceived and implemented it. It is not a liturgical Mass, in the sense desired today by the most intransigent reformists of sacred music, but follows the tradition of the best authors of the 'concertante' religious genre in great style: M. Haydn, Cherubini, Mozart, Beethoven, etc. With this work, its illustrious father left another very clear testimony of his high and learned culture, of his many fruitful activities, of his most noble feelings as a man and artist.

— Vito Fedeli, 12 December 1920

=== Workers' Hymn ===
In 1886, Galli set Filippo Turati's Workers' Hymn to music, his best-known composition. The Workers' Hymn was commissioned by the first exponents of Italian socialism, particularly Costantino Lazzari, who would become secretary of the Italian Socialist Party. The circumstances that led to Galli's commission are disputed, and according to one account, Galli was deceived to believe that the tune would be used on some other text than the Workers' Hymn, written by Luigi Persico. He recycled a tune he had composed earlier in his life, for some association that he could not recall. A letter from the mayor of Finale Emilia, dated to 5 December 1904, claims that Galli lifted a setting of the Tantum ergo sung in Finale's churches.

Lazzari recalled hearing Galli play the tune for the first time in February 1886, at his offices in Il Secolo, quietly to avoid the attention of its inimical contributors in the neighbouring rooms. The text of the anthem, which was later modified to fit the music, was published on 7 March 1886, and it was performed for the first time on 28 March 1886, at a conference of the Italian Workers' Party, which was led by Lazzari and supported by Turati.

The song became popular, particularly in socialist opposition to the Marcia Reale, the Kingdom of Italy's official national anthem. Galli was uncomfortable with his association to it, and kept his authorship of the music unknown: he did not want to enter a bitter rivalry between the Italian Workers' Party and the Italian Radical Party, and he feared repercussions from the Milan Conservatory and his professional circles. Besides, Galli was a practising Catholic, politically conservative, and a landowner.

Singing the Workers' Hymn was banned in public, and from 1892, it incurred a custodial sentence of at least 75 days as well as a fine of 100 lire. The song was banned again during the First World War, and after the Battle of Caporetto in autumn 1917, the prefecture of Milan forced Galli to withdraw copies of the anthem from the market at his expense. Galli was kept under police surveillance for his life, under suspicion of being a subversive. The ordeal of the anthem led Galli to significant fear and stress in his later life, leading to an illness from which he did not recover. He was known to murmur: "Blasted hymn, how much you cost me!". The song was banned again under Fascist Italy, after Galli's death.

Initially, the music was attributed to "Giano Martelli", an anagram of Galli. Galli was first identified as the music's composer during a police report in 1894, and in 1917, a socialist publication publicly credited him. Some contend that the music was composed by Zenone Mattei, a composer from Amelia who was first credited in a Swiss edition from 1894.

== Retirement and death ==
In 1894, Galli purchased a summer holiday home on Via Santa Maria in Cerreto, a rural lane between the villages of Gaiofana and Fienili, near Rimini's border with Coriano. In 1904, Galli retired permanently to Rimini, purchasing an apartment in the city centre in 1906, at the corner of Via Alessandro Gambalunga and Via Santa Maria al Mare. He was a popular local celebrity. Despite illness, he continued to compose and direct local music schools.

Galli died in Rimini on 8 December 1919. He was buried in the Monumental Cemetery of Rimini alongside his sister and wife, who was a Polish singer. Galli was survived by his son, Pericle.

== Legacy ==
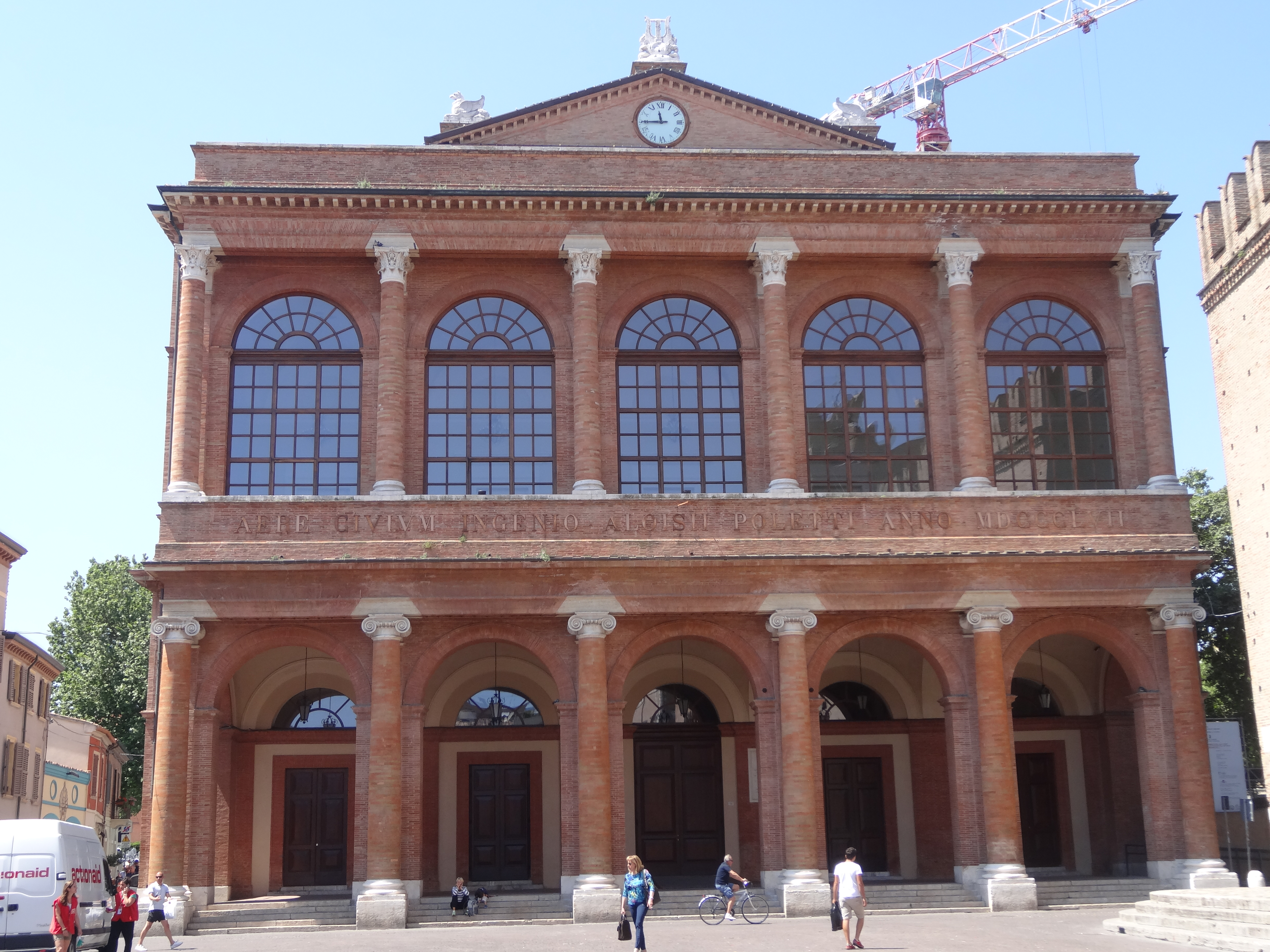
The Amintore Galli Theatre's façade in June 2015

On 6 May 1947, following the deposition of the Italian monarchy, a unanimous resolution of Rimini's municipal government renamed the Victor Emmanuel II Theatre after Galli. The theatre had been partially destroyed by Allied aerial bombardment in December 1943, and was not fully restored until October 2018.

Founded in September 1994, Rimini's choral association is named after Galli. Streets bear his name in Rimini and Novafeltria. Pope Benedict XVI was gifted a copy of his Missa pacis (1919). Amintore Fanfani, who served several terms as Prime Minister of Italy, was named after Galli.

In 2002, the publication of the book Rimini e Amintore Galli reappraised Galli's association with the city, discovering a deeper connection than was believed for an artist who spent most of his life elsewhere. On 20 September 2002, a plaque commemorating Galli was unveiled on the site of his final residence in the city.

On 27 June 2009, Galli's tomb was restored with funding from Rimini's Rotary Club. On 9 October 2011, Missa pacis was performed in Rimini's Tempio Malatestiano, its first time at the venue, in celebration of Saint Gaudentius, Rimini's patron saint.

In recent years, Rimini has hosted several conferences and events dedicated to Galli, including in 2002, 2018, and 2021.

== Selected works ==
=== Theatrical compositions ===
Two of Galli's operas were performed in his lifetime:

- Il corno d'oro or Un'avventura nel serraglio (1876). The work premiered in Turin's Teatro Balbo on 30 August 1876, and later performed in Barcelona.
- Davide (1804). The opera premiered in Milan's Teatro Lirico on 12 November 1904. It was repeated in Milan's Teatro Dal Verme on 23 November 1906 and in Rimini's Victor Emmanuel II Theatre, as part of its fiftieth anniversary celebrations, on 6 January 1907. In September 1952, Davide was revived in Rimini in Galli's honour. The score to Davide has been lost, but the vocal and piano sheet music remains.

Galli's other pieces include:

- Espiazione (Milan, 1867)
- Atonement (Rimini, 1867), an oratorio with his own verses inspired by the poem Lalla Rookh (1817) by Thomas Moore
- Cristo a Golgota (Finale Emilia, 1871)
- Workers' Hymn (Milan, 1886), with verses by Filippo Turati
- Missa pacis (Rimini, 1919), directed by Augusto Massari, performed on 14 September 1919 in Rimini's Church of San Giovanni Battista, during a solemn ceremony for the conclusion of the First World War
- Totentanz (n.d.), a baritone solo with an orchestra

Galli wrote the following librettos, which were never published or performed:

- Il Risorgimento (1870)
- Roma (1870), which was banned by the Milanese police
- Follia tragica (1870), whose production was cancelled shortly before its first scheduled performance

For Sonzongo's publishing house, Galli wrote piano reductions of works by other composers, principally Pietro Mascagni (L'amico Fritz, I Rantzau, Guglielmo Ratcliff, Silvano, Zanetto, and Le Maschere). Galli also wrote piano reductions of Achille Montuoro's Fieschi and Umberto Giordano's Andrea Chénier.

=== Essays ===
Galli's essays include:

- Arte fonetica, istituzioni scientifiche musicali. Prolegomeni (Milan, 1870)
- Alle scuole musicali d'Italia. Trattato di contrappunto e fuga (Milan, 1877)
- Sunto di lezioni di storia, teoria ed estetica della musica (Milan, 1880)
- Storia teorica ed estetica della musica: programmi e sunti di lezione (Milan, 1881)
- Ortofonia, rettorica della musica (Milan, 1884)
- Saggio storico e teorico sulla notazione musicale (Milan, 1886)
- Manuale del capomusica. Trattato di strumentazione per banda (Milan, 1889)
- Il canto da sala e da teatro (Milan, 1889)
- Il polifonista al pianoforte (Milan, 1891)
- La musica ed i musicisti dal secolo X sino ai nostri giorni (Milan, 1892)
- Strumenti e strumentazione. Nozioni teorico-pratiche compendiate (Milan, 1897)
- Etnografia musicale (Milan, 1898)
- Estetica della musica ossia Del bello nella musica sacra, teatrale e da concerto in ordine alla sua storia (Turin, 1900)
- Storia e teoria del sistema musicale moderno (Milan, 1901)
- Appello al buon senso (Venice, n.d.)
- Storia e teoria della musica militare in Europa (Milan, n.d.)
- Del canto liturgico cristiano e suo accompagnamento (Milan, n.d.)

Galli authored several short treatises for Sonzogno's publishing house:

- Nozioni di musica (1875)
- Trattato di contrappunto e fuga (1877)
- La musica dei Greci, degli Arabi e degli Indiani, sunto di lezioni (1879)
- Elementi di armonia (n.d.)
- Esercitazioni di lettura musicale per istrumenti da fiato (n.d.)

His monographs include those of:

- Gaetano Donizetti (Milan, 1873, with Federico Alborghetti)
- Simon Mayr (Bergamo, 1875, with Federico Alborghetti)
- Alberto Mazzucatto (Milan, 1879)
- Eugenio Bubali (Veroli, 1912)
- Umberto Giordano (Milan, 1915, with Gustavo Macchi and Giulio Cesare Paribeni)
- Antonio Bazzini (Milan, n.d.)
