= Workers' Hymn =

Italian socialist anthem by Filippo Turati

L'Inno dei Lavoratori
English: The Workers' Hymn
- Also known as: Il Canto dei Lavoratori (English: Workers' Song); L'Inno del Partito Operai Italiano (English: Hymn of the Italian Workers' Party)
- Lyrics: Filippo Turati, 1886
- Music: Amintore Galli, 1886
- Published: 7 March 1886; 140 years ago

Audio sample
- Recording by Milan's Corale Verdi: file; help

The Workers' Hymn (Italian: L'Inno dei Lavoratori) or Workers' Song (Il Canto dei Lavoratori), also known as the Hymn of the Italian Workers' Party (L'Inno del Partito Operaio Italiano), is an Italian socialist anthem written by Filippo Turati, and set to music by Amintore Galli.

Published in March 1886, the song was composed for the Italian Workers' Party, led by Costantino Lazzari. It quickly became popular, and is considered one of the most significant historic songs of the Italian workers' movement, alongside Bandiera Rossa, The Internationale, and the Hymn of the First of May . It was censored by successive governments of the Kingdom of Italy, including during the First World War and under Fascist Italy.

Despite the anthem's popularity, its authors were ashamed of their work. Turati later declared the poem "a juvenile poetic sin", while Galli kept his authorship of the music unknown, and was tormented by fear and stress in his later life due to its popularity and censorship.

== History ==
=== Textual composition ===
The Workers' Hymn was commissioned by the first exponents of Italian socialism, particularly Costantino Lazzari, future secretary of the Italian Socialist Party. Lazzari, then leader of the Italian Workers' Party, wanted an anthem to inaugurate the standard of the League of Children of Labour (Lega dei Figli del Lavoro), a Milanese association of manual workers that advocated for mutual aid, popular education, the protection of workers' rights, and social emancipation.

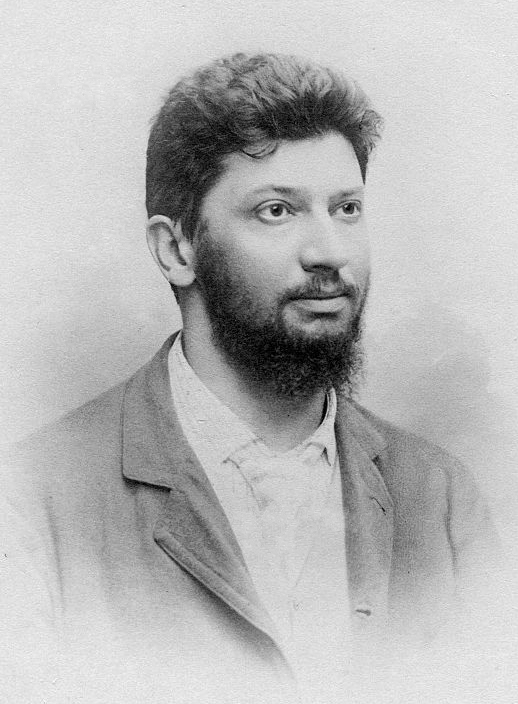
Filippo Turati, circa 1890

For the text, Lazzari commissioned Filippo Turati, a young lawyer associated with the Milanese Socialist League, which was recognised for its intellectual character. Turati was reluctant to compose the anthem, but was encouraged by his mother, Adele. He was ashamed of the final text, and promised Lazzari to rewrite it, but Lazzari accepted it. The anthem was published on 7 March 1886 in Milanese newspaper La Farfalla, crediting Turati. On 20 and 21 March 1886, the anthem was published without crediting Turati in the party's journal, Il Fascio Operaio. The text was modified to fit the music.

Years after the song's publication, in his trial for the Bava Beccaris massacre, Turati was asked to declare his authorship of the anthem, which he affirmed. He said that the anthem was a "juvenile poetic sin", and retorted:

They have put me on trial so many times for those verses as incitements for class hatred. Instead, they should have sentenced me to death for inciting a crime against Poetry.

— Filippo Turati

=== Musical composition ===
The music for the Workers' Hymn was composed by Amintore Galli, then artistic director of Edoardo Sonzogno's Casa Musicale Sonzogno and Chair of Counterpoint and Musical Aesthetics at the Milan Conservatory. The Workers' Hymn is Galli's most famous composition.

The circumstances that led to Galli's commission are disputed. According to one account, Galli was deceived to believe that the tune would be used on some other text than the Workers' Hymn, written by Luigi Persico. He recycled a tune he had composed earlier in his life, for some association that he could not recall. A letter from the mayor of Finale Emilia, dated to 5 December 1904, claims that Galli lifted a setting of the Tantum ergo sung in Finale's churches; Galli had lived in Finale between 1871 and 1873.

Lazzari recalled hearing Galli play the composition for the first time in February 1886, at Galli's offices in Il Secolo, Sonzogno's newspaper, for which Galli was a music critic. Galli played quietly to avoid the attention of the newspaper's inimical contributors in the neighbouring rooms. The composition was auditioned among Lazzari's comrades "in a cheerful carneval evening, which we held in the modest trattoria Iresoldi in Via Bocchetto", and immediately caught on.

The first edition of the music has not been recovered, and likely did not contain Galli's name. It may have been clandestinely printed at the Casa Musicale Sonzogno. Some contend that the music was composed by Zenone Mattei, a composer from Amelia, Umbria, who was first credited in a Swiss edition from 1894, printed by Zürich's Tipografia Industriale. Galli had lived in Amelia shortly after graduating from the Milan Conservatory.

=== Popularity ===
On 28 March 1886, the song had its first public performance at a conference of the Italian Workers' Party. The venue and performers are disputed between the hall of the Workers' Association in Via Campo Lodigiano, performed by the Società Corale Donizetti, and the headquarters of the Italian Workers' Party in Via San Vittorio al Teatro, performed by the Società Corale Vincenzo Bellini.

The song became popular, particularly in republican and socialist opposition to the Marcia Reale, the Kingdom of Italy's official national anthem. It was reproduced in many songbooks, and inspired several variants and parodies. In 1888, Lazzari sung the song to an international trade unionist congress in London, in the presence of John Burns, to a warm reception. Lazzari also recalled singing the song outside the walls of Casale Monferrato's prison, where an imprisoned socialist, Alfredo Casati, repeated the song to him.

The Italian Socialist Party, founded in 1892, adopted the song as its official anthem. It was sung in the earliest International Workers' Day celebrations in Italy. In 1899, the party declared the anthem one of the three best-known Italian socialist anthems, together with the Marcia Socialista Mondiale and the Hymn of the First of May.

On 7 June 1914, carabinieri in Ancona killed three protestors during an antimilitarist march that sung the anthem.

During the Biennio Rosso, two years of intense social upheaval in Italy between 1919 and 1920, the song was popularly sung by socialists alongside the Bandiera Rossa and The Internationale. Fascist squads parodied the opening lines: Come brothers, come comrades, / Come, come, in a thick crowd was replaced by Come people, to the rescue / To communists, we break their bones.

=== Censorship ===
The Workers' Hymn received official censorship even before it was ever performed: five days before its premiere, the prefecture of Milan had communicated to the party that the song was not to be sung nor its conference hosted, in the interests of public order and safety. Singing the Workers' Hymn was quickly banned in public, and from 1892, it incurred a custodial sentence of at least 75 days as well as a fine of 100 lire. Numerous accounts record trials in which the prosecution and defence debated whether a defendant had sung the song or some innocent song. The application of the prohibition varied by province: during the early 1890s, the public prosecutor's office in Milan merely seized 9,000 printed copies of the anthem, on the pretext of legal irregularities among the publishers, while the police station of Reggio Emilia went further and arrested singers.

On 21 February 1896, Italy's Court of Cassation definitively ruled that singing the anthem could constitute a crime against Article 247 of Italy's penal code if an intention to incite class hatred could be proved. A note from the Ministry of the Interior to the prefecture of Bologna, dated 28 December 1986, affirmed that "by the judicial orders of Parma, Catania, and Milan", "it is beyond any doubt that the printed version of the Workers' Hymn must always be seized".

By 1902, the song was no longer prohibited, though it was censored again during the First World War and under Fascist Italy. On 23 August 1940, the anarchist Ciro Musiani was reported in Rimini for humming the hymn in a tavern, leading to a short imprisonment.

=== Galli's authorship ===
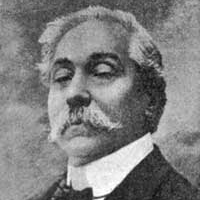
Amintore Galli

Galli was uncomfortable with his association to the anthem, and kept his authorship of the music unknown: he did not want to enter a bitter rivalry between the Italian Workers' Party and the Italian Radical Party for the 1886 election, and he feared repercussions from the Milan Conservatory and his professional circles. Besides, Galli was a practising Catholic, politically conservative, and a landowner.

Initially, the music was attributed to "Giano Martelli", an anagram of Galli. Galli was first identified as the music's composer during a police report in 1894, and in 1917, the Milanese Almanacco Socialista Italiano 1917, a socialist publication, publicly credited him. After the Battle of Caporetto in autumn 1917, the prefecture of Milan forced Galli to withdraw copies of the hymn from the market at his expense. Galli was kept under police surveillance for his life, under suspicion of being a subversive. The ordeal of the anthem led Galli to significant fear and stress, leading to an illness from which he did not recover. He was known to murmur: "Blasted hymn, how much you cost me!".

== Lyrics ==
Italian lyrics

Su fratelli, su compagne,
su, venite in fitta schiera:
sulla libera bandiera
splende il sol dell'avvenir.

Nelle pene e nell'insulto
ci stringemmo in mutuo patto,
la gran causa del riscatto
niun di noi vorrà tradir.

Coro:
Il riscatto del lavoro
dei suoi figli opra sarà:
𝄆 o vivremo del lavoro
o pugnando si morrà. 𝄇

La risaia e la miniera
ci han fiaccati ad ogni stento
come i bruti d'un armento
siam sfruttati dai signor.

I signor per cui pugnammo
ci han rubato il nostro pane,
ci han promessa una dimane:
la diman si aspetta ancor.

Coro

L'esecrato capitale
nelle macchine ci schiaccia,
l'altrui solco queste braccia
son dannate a fecondar.

Lo strumento del lavoro
nelle mani dei redenti
spenga gli odii e fra le genti
chiami il dritto a trionfar.

Coro

Se divisi siam canaglia,
stretti in fascio siam potenti;
sono il nerbo delle genti
quei che han braccio e che han cor.

Ogni cosa è sudor nostro,
noi disfar, rifar possiamo;
la consegna sia: sorgiamo
troppo lungo fu il dolor.

Coro

Maledetto chi gavazza
nell'ebbrezza e nei festini,
fin che i giorni un uom trascini
senza pane e senza amor.

Maledetto chi non geme
dello scempio dei fratelli,
chi di pace ne favelli
sotto il pie dell'oppressor.

Coro

I confini scellerati
cancelliam dagli emisferi;
i nemici, gli stranieri
non son lungi ma son qui.

Guerra al regno della Guerra,
morte al regno della morte;
contro il dritto del del più forte,
forza amici, è giunto il dì.

Coro

O sorelle di fatica
o consorti negli affanni
che ai negrieri, che ai tiranni
deste il sangue e la beltà.

Agli imbelli, ai proni al giogo
mai non splenda il vostro riso:
un esercito diviso
la vittoria non corrà.

Coro

Se eguaglianza non è frode,
fratellanza un'ironia,
se pugnar non fu follia
per la santa libertà;

Su fratelli, su compagne,
tutti i poveri son servi:
cogli ignavi e coi protervi
il transigere è viltà.

Coro

English translation

Come brothers, come comrades,
come, come in a thick crowd:
on the free flag
the sun of the future shines.

In punishment and in insult,
we bound ourselves in mutual pact.
The great cause of redemption
none of us will want to betray.

Chorus:
The redemption of labour
will be the work of its children:
𝄆 either we shall live by labour
or fighting, we shall die. 𝄇

The rice field and the mine
have exhausted us with every struggle.
Like the beasts of a herd,
we are exploited by the lords.

The lords for whom we fight
have stolen our bread.
They promised us a tomorrow;
that tomorrow is still awaited.

Chorus

The execrated capital
crushes us in the machinery.
The furrows of others, these arms
are damned to fertilise.

The tool of labour
in the hands of the redeemed
extinguishes hatred among peoples,
calls for Justice to triumph.

Chorus

If divided we are scoundrels,
united we are powerful.
The sinew of peoples
are those with arms and heart.

Everything is our sweat:
we can unmake, remake.
The command is: rise up,
too long has been the pain.

Chorus

Cursed be those who revel
in drunkenness and feasts,
for as long as man toils
without bread and without love.

Cursed be those who do not mourn
the massacre of brothers,
those who speak of peace
under the foot of the oppressor.

Chorus

The wicked borders
we will cancel from the hemispheres:
the enemies, the foreigners,
are not far away, but they are here.

War to the kingdom of war;
death to the kingdom of death.
Against the right of the strongest,
have strength, friends, the day has come.

Chorus

O sisters of toil,
o spouses in the troubles,
for whom slavers, for whom tyrants,
you gave blood and beauty.

To the cowards, to those bowed to the yoke,
may your smile never shine:
a divided army
will not run to victory.

Chorus

If equality is not a fraud,
brotherhood not an irony,
if fighting were not madness
for sacred liberty:

Come brothers, come comrades,
all the poor are slaves.
With the lazy and arrogant,
compromise is cowardice.

Chorus

== In popular culture ==
The eighth chapter of Alfredo Panzini's La lanterna di Diogene (1907) is entitled after the hymn. Panzini recounts passing a group of socialists singing the anthem, with a postman in the crowd asking him: "Don't we scare you now, rich man?" Panzini suggested that an additional verse in the hymn should be dedicated to the farmers of Romagna, and advocate "diligence and passion for agricultural work...two qualities [that are] not in excess". On the hymn's music, he reflected:

O good and gentle Amintore Galli, the music of your anthem may not exactly be beautiful, but it is terrible, or at least, it has a terrible effect. That note that grows and then breaks like a hurricane in the verse "The sun of the future shines": it has an indisputable effect.

— Alfredo Panzini, La lanterna di Diogene (1907)

Il sol dell'avvenire, a 2023 Italian-French comedy-drama written and directed by Nanni Moretti, shares its title with a phrase from the third line of the Workers' Hymn. The plot concerns the reaction of a chapter of the Italian Communist Party to the Hungarian Revolution of 1956.
