= Giuseppe Giovanni Pietro Alberganti =

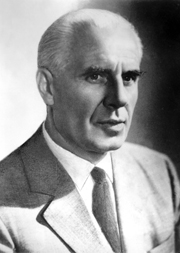
Giuseppe Alberganti

Giuseppe Giovanni Pietro Alberganti (Stradella, July 24, 1898 – Milan, November 3, 1980) was an Italian worker, trade unionist, antifascist, partisan and politician.

== Biography ==
He was a deputy, senator of the Republic, and a leader of the Milanese federation of the PCI.

The grandson of Giovanni Ravazzoli, who was a socialist militant, Alberganti was the son of a worker and day laborer. He grew up in Stradella, a center influenced during those years by the socialism of Filippo Turati and Claudio Treves, as well as the extreme ideological influences of Costantino Lazzari and Paolo Ravazzoli, the latter being his fellow townsman.

At the age of 10, he moved to Milan with his family and began working as a shop boy and fitter in a factory, while also pursuing his studies. In 1914, he worked as a mechanic and was profiled for the first time due to his antimilitarist stance. In 1916, he joined the railways as a trainee fireman, and in 1918 he was sent to Libya.

He took over the leadership of the Arditi del Popolo, an antifascist movement popular among the proletarian masses. Due to conflicts with fascist militias, he emigrated to France and in 1923, went to the USSR where he attended a military school. He supported the communist Gramscian line and in 1937, he was in Spain fighting alongside the Republicans.

In 1939, he was arrested and transferred to the Le Vernet Internment Camp. In 1943, he was released and participated in the Italian resistance. From 1945 to 1947, he was the General Secretary of the Labor Chamber in Milan. From 1948 to 1958, he was a senator for the PCI, and from 1958 to 1963, he was a deputy.

He supported the student and worker movements of the late 1960s and early 1970s. In 1976, he became the president of the Workers' Movement for Socialism (MLS).

He rests in a columbarium at the Monumental Cemetery of Milan.

== Legacy ==
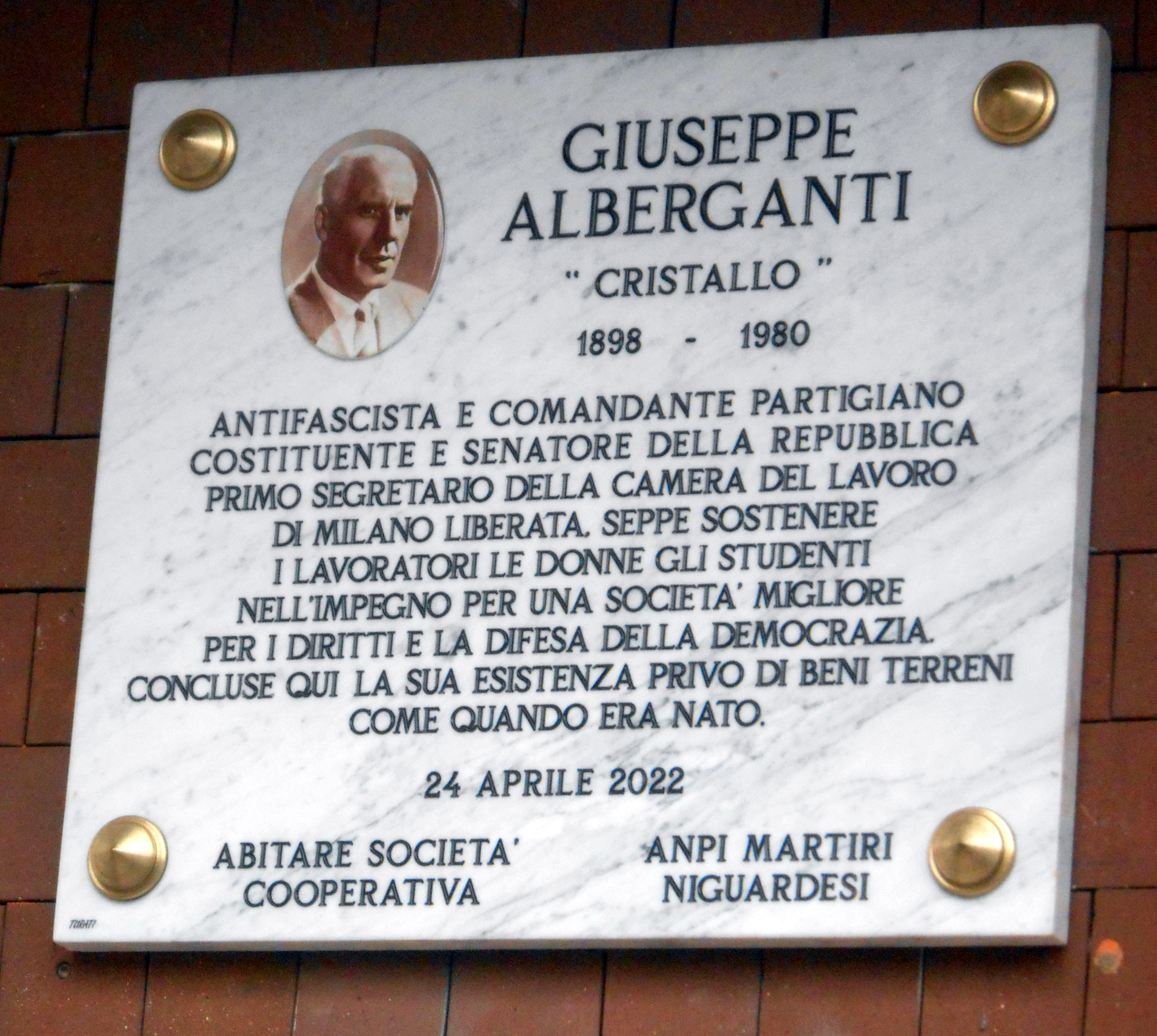
Plaque of Giuseppe Alberganti at Via Val di Ledro,23 in Milan's Niguarda district

In front of a large audience and several partisans from the ANPI, on April 23, 2022, a plaque dedicated to Giuseppe Alberganti, codenamed "Cristallo", was unveiled. The plaque is located on a wall at Via Val di Ledro 23 in the historic district of Niguarda in Milan, where Alberganti lived until his death. The Niguarda district made a significant contribution to the Italian Resistance, fighting against the fascists and Nazis.

The plaque reads: "Giuseppe Alberganti 'Cristallo' 1898–1980"

Antifascist and partisan commander – Constituent and senator of the Republic – First secretary of the liberated Milan Labor Chamber, he knew how to support workers, women, and students, in their commitment to a better society for rights and the defense of Democracy. He ended his existence here without any worldly possessions, as when he was born – April 24, 2022
