= Arnara =

- Comune
- Comune di Arnara
- Location within Italy Location within Lazio
- Coordinates: 41°35′N 13°23′E
- Country: Italy
- Region: Lazio
- Province: Frosinone (FR)
- Frazioni: Colle Orso, Costa Grande, Sterparo

Government
  - Mayor: Massimo Fiori

Area
  - Total: 12.29 km^{2} (4.75 sq mi)
- Elevation: 250 m (820 ft)

Population (28 February 2017)
  - Total: 2,299
  - Density: 187.1/km^{2} (484.5/sq mi)
- Time zone: UTC+1 (CET)
  - Summer (DST): UTC+2 (CEST)
- Postal code: 03020
- Dialing code: 0775
- Patron saint: St. Sebastian
- Saint day: January 20
- Website: Official website

Arnara is a comune (municipality) in the Province of Frosinone in the Italian region Lazio, located about 80 kilometres (50 mi) southeast of Rome and about 6 kilometres (4 mi) southeast of Frosinone.

Arnara borders the following municipalities: Ceccano, Frosinone, Pofi, Ripi, Torrice. Sights include the medieval castle.

== Physical geography ==
=== Territory ===
Arnara is situated at 250 meters above sea level on the low hills of the Sacco Valley, the last foothills of the Ernici mountains. Within the municipal territory flows the Fosso d'Arnara, a small tributary on the left of the Sacco River, and the more southern Fosso Meringo, also a small left tributary of the Sacco.

== Twin towns ==
- Bistra, Croatia
