= San Paolo Apostolo, Veroli =

Church and convent in Veroli, Lazio, Italy

Coordinates: 41.689143°N 13.417579°E

San Paolo Apostolo is a Romanesque architecture, Roman Catholic church and convent located on Via Cavour in the town of Veroli, province of Frosinone, region of Lazio, Italy.

== History ==
A church at the site likely dates from paleo-Christian era; inscriptions at the site link the church to the apostle Paul. A Lombard-Romanesque style church was located here before the year 1000. It was a chapter for canons until the 20th century. The present collegiate church dates from 1804.
