= Castro dei Volsci =

- Comune
- Comune di Castro dei Volsci
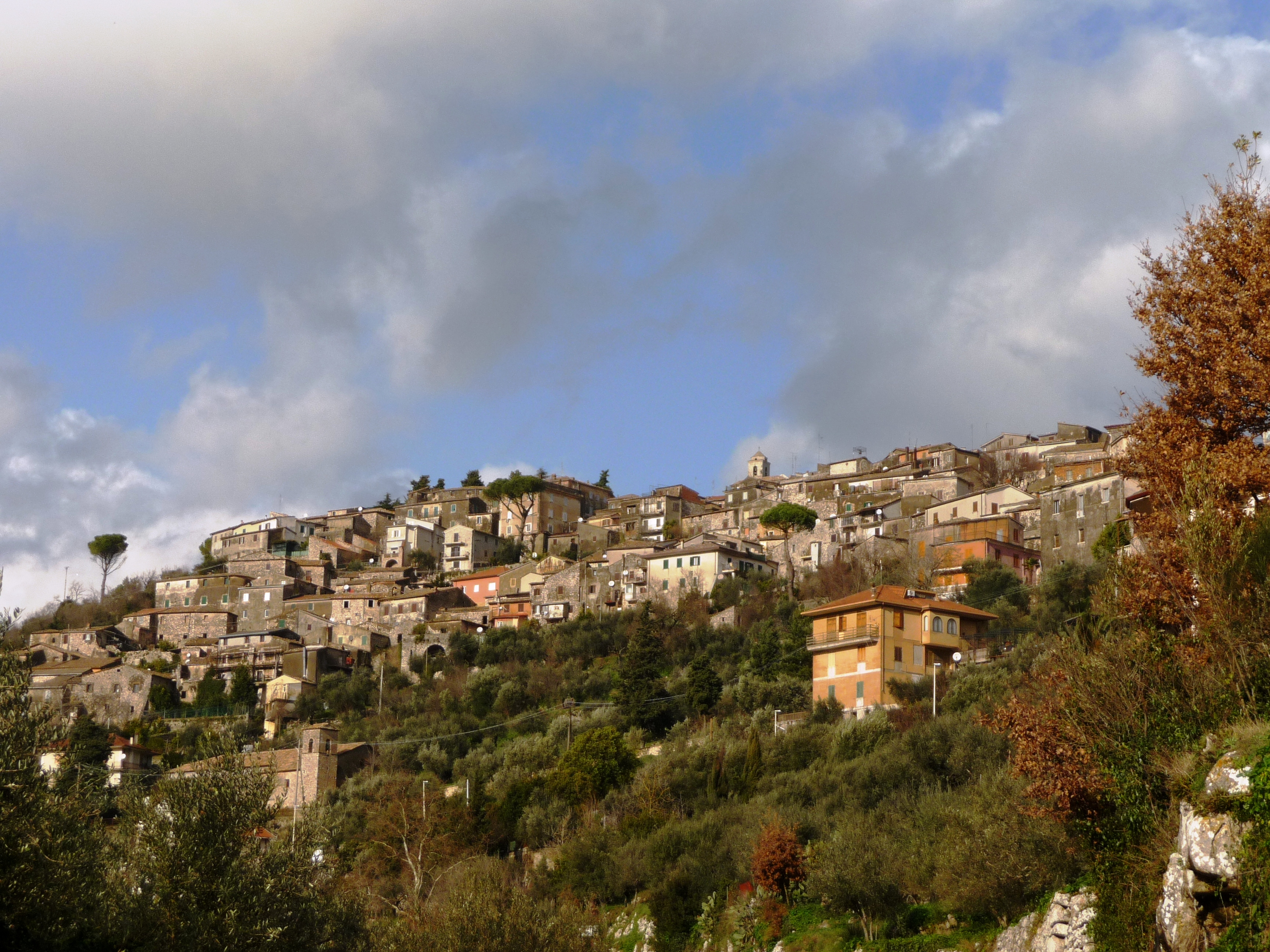
- View of Castro dei Volsci

- Coat of arms

- Location within Italy Location within Lazio
- Coordinates: 41°31′N 13°24′E
- Country: Italy
- Region: Lazio
- Province: Frosinone (FR)
- Frazioni: Barbugliano, Camporosello, Cavatelle, Centro Storico, Collecavallo, Collenuovo, Collepece, Crespasa, Farneta, Flagellano, Fosso, Limate, Madonna del Piano, Montecrispi, Montenero, Pinna, Pozzotello, Ranetto, Rio Sacco, San Giacomo, San Sosio, San Tamaro, Scarpatosta, Selvotta, Stazione, Quattro Strade, Vallefratta, Vallereale

Government
  - Mayor: Leonardo Ambrosi

Area
  - Total: 58.45 km^{2} (22.57 sq mi)
- Elevation: 385 m (1,263 ft)

Population (31/07/2025)
  - Total: 4,342
  - Density: 74.29/km^{2} (192.4/sq mi)
- Demonym: Castresi
- Time zone: UTC+1 (CET)
  - Summer (DST): UTC+2 (CEST)
- Postal code: 03020
- Dialing code: 0775
- Patron saint: St. Oliva of Anagni
- Saint day: June 3
- Website: Official website

Castro dei Volsci (Ciocaro: Cascetre) is a comune (municipality) in the Province of Frosinone in the Italian region Lazio, located about 90 kilometres (56 mi) southeast of Rome and about 14 kilometres (9 mi) southeast of Frosinone. It takes its name from the Latin word Castrum (meaning "Castle") and the Volsci, who lived here in ancient times.

Castro dei Volsci borders the following municipalities: Amaseno, Ceccano, Ceprano, Falvaterra, Lenola, Pastena, Pofi, Vallecorsa and Villa Santo Stefano. It is one of I Borghi più belli d'Italia ("The most beautiful villages of Italy").

It is located in the Sacco River valley. It is the birthplace of the actor Nino Manfredi.
