= Critica Sociale =

Italian newspaper

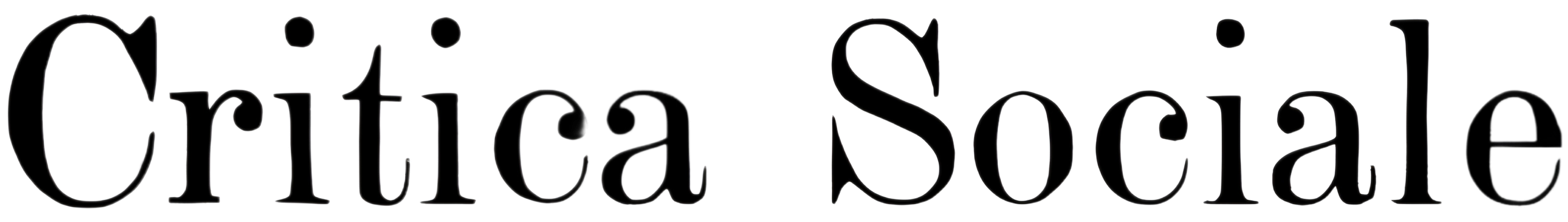

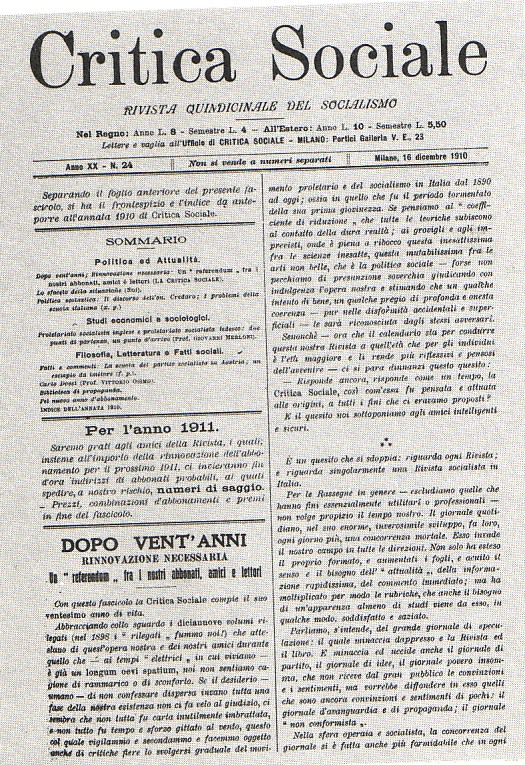
- Type: weekly newspaper
- Owner: Giornalisti Editori scarl
- Publisher: Ugo Finetti, Sergio Scalpelli
- Editor: Stefano Carluccio
- Founded: 15 January 1891
- Ceased publication: Suspended 1926, revived 1946
- Political alignment: Social-democratic, formerly Marxist/Socialist
- Headquarters: Milan
- Website: www.criticasociale.net

Critica Sociale is a left-wing Italian newspaper. It is linked to the Italian Socialist Party. Before Benito Mussolini banned opposition newspapers in 1926, Critica Sociale was a prominent supporter of the original Italian Socialist Party (PSI), which included a spectrum of views from socialism to Marxism.

== History ==
=== From republicanism to socialism ===
Arcangelo Ghisleri founded a republican political journal called Cuore e Critica in the late 19th century. A former employee, Filippo Turati, succeeded Ghisleri on 15 January 1891 and renamed it Critica Sociale. On 1 January 1893 it moved its political stance, towards socialism. It backed the founding of the PSI at the party's Genoa Conference and changed its masthead to read: "Weekly review of social, political and literary studies of scientific Socialism".

It became the most influential Marxist review in Italy from 1891 to 1898, tackling all the serious public problems of 1890s Italy: banking scandals, repression of the Fasci Siciliani unrest, the colonial war in Africa, and food riots. It featured writing by the most influential socialist thinkers in Italy and abroad, including Enrico Ferri, Lelio Basso, Paul Lafargue, Ivanoe Bonomi, Antonio Graziadei, Antonio Labriola and many others. From 1 May 1898 to 1 July 1899, it was seized by the government and its editor was briefly imprisoned.

In 1901 the journal restarted, as Turati, its editors, and the PSI were entering parliament with the support of Giovanni Giolitti's powerful Liberal Party. In this phase the review became the expression of the reformist tendency inside of the PSI.

From 1902 to 1913 the review was involved in the debate over anti-clerical school reform; discussing the role teachers, their organisation, school building and hygiene, while opposing government budgets that favoured the Ministry of War over the needs of public education.

Critica Sociale adopted, in discussing literature, a positivist and Marxist critical methodology and, convinced of the importance of literature, education and libraries, printed the sociological writing of Pietro Gori beside the poetry of Ada Negri and serialized novels by Italo Svevo. Even if seen as lagging the ideological-literary fashions of the age, Critica Sociale tried to inform its readers on new tendencies, giving judgments and appraisals filtered through its socialist outlook.

Showing little acceptance of the then popular ideas of Nietzsche and d'Annunzio, Critica Sociale editors were instead convinced that intellectuals must open themselves up to and promote new modern ideas while inculcating culture with 'scientific' truth and the requirements of a life led for the benefit of society.

=== World War I and opposition to fascism ===
When Italy entered the First World War in May 1915, Critica Sociale did not lose its neutrality nor did it lose its reformist ideals when faced with the Bolshevik Revolution in October 1917. While not denying the legitimacy of Vladimir Lenin's revolutionary method, Critica Sociale editors argued it was inapplicable to the Italian situation. But from 1917, the positions of the two wings the PSI became intractable. At the Livorno Conference of January 1921, the nascent Marxist-Leninist wing led by Amadeo Bordiga left the PSI to become the Italian Communist Party. Critica Sociale continued to support the reformist Unitary Socialist Party.

Benito Mussolini's rise to power was a second blow to Critica Sociale. Press censorship and seizures by the government led to irregular publication.

Deprived of resources, writers such as Turati, Anna Kulischov, Giacomo Matteotti, Claudio Treves, and Carlo Rosselli continued to defend the democratic order which was being swept away by the Fascists, and total censorship loomed. Its last political article was published the day after the murder of Giacomo Matteotti on 10 June 1924, an act which Mussolini used to take absolute power in Italy.

Thereafter the editors sheltered behind inoffensive cultural and doctrinale essays. The next year the Fascist government pronounced a blanket ban on opposition press; the last issue was dated 16 September - 15 October 1926.

=== Revival after World War II ===
Following the fall of the Fascist regime in 1946, it was reestablished, and has remained in print under a succession of editors-in-chief: Ugoberto Alfassio Grimaldi, Umberto Giovine and Carlo Tognoli (with Paolo Brera as deputy editor). It is currently the official publication of the New Italian Socialist Party, a minor social-democratic political party. In recent years it has paid particular attention to the reinvention of British centre-left politics under New Labour, and has published articles by both Tony Blair and Gordon Brown.

== See also ==
- List of magazines in Italy

== Bibliography ==
- Filippo Turati, Trent’anni di Critica Sociale, Zanichelli, 1921
- The Antonio Labriola Archive. (1897). Letter to Critica Socialel
- Enrico Ferri 1902 debating with G. Cassola in Critica Sociale
- Ian Steedman, Socialist Debate on the Theory of Value and Distribution: `La Critica Sociale' 1891-1901. in Socialism & Marginalism in Economics 1870 - 1930. Ian Steedman, ed. Routledge Studies in the History of Economics (1995). ISBN 0-203-20899-4
