= Costantino Lazzari =

Italian politician

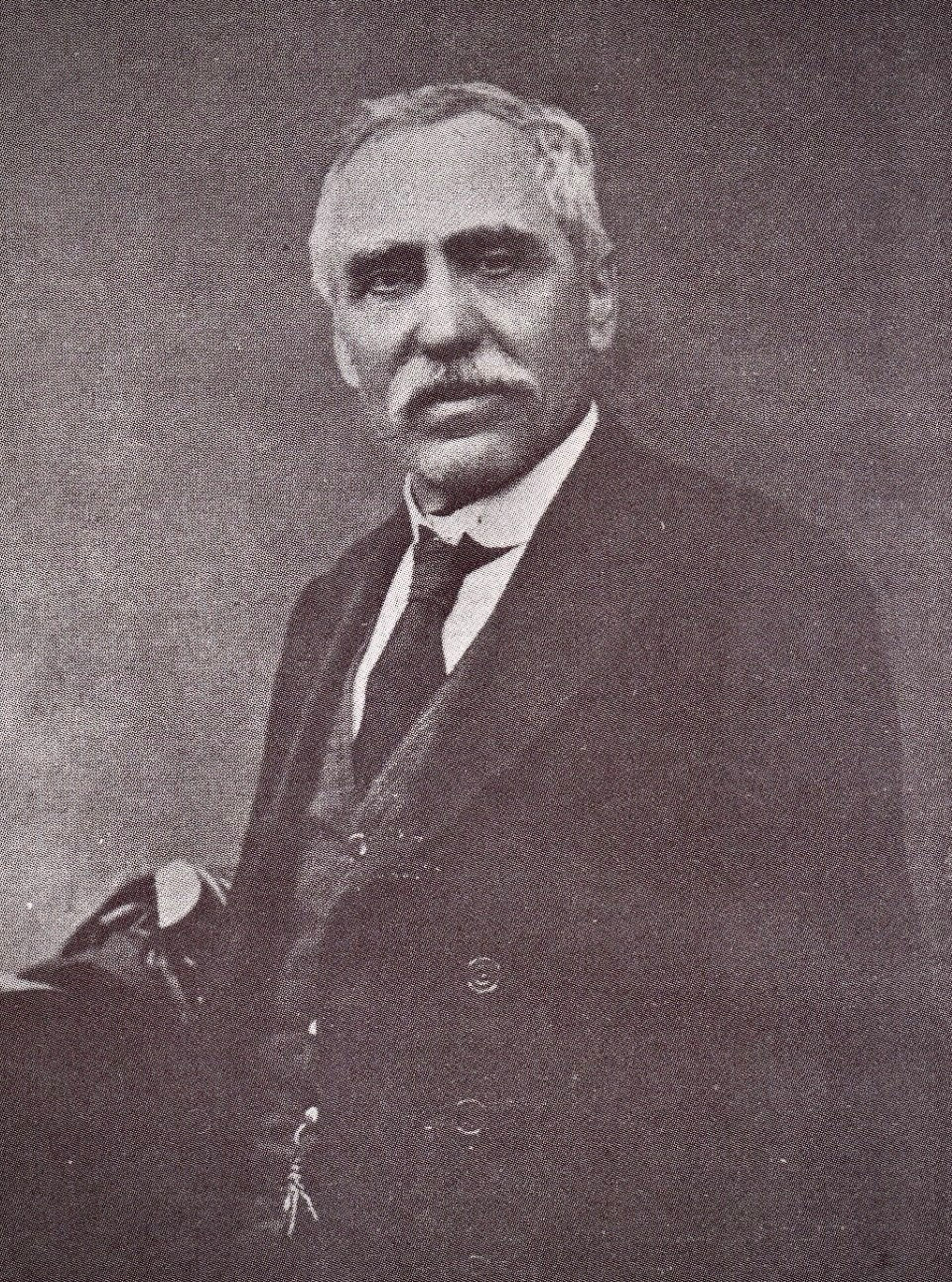

Secretary of the Italian Socialist Party
- In office 10 July 1912 – 11 October 1919
- Preceded by: Pompeo Ciotti
- Succeeded by: Nicola Bombacci

Member of the Chamber of Deputies
- In office 1 December 1919 – 9 November 1926
- Constituency: Venice

Personal details
- Born: 1 January 1857 Cremona, Italy
- Died: 29 December 1927 (aged 70) Rome, Italy
- Party: POI (1882–1892); PSI (1892–1922)

Costantino Lazzari (1 January 1857 – 29 December 1927) was an Italian politician. He was one of the founders and main leaders of the Italian Socialist Party.

== Biography ==
Constantino Lazzari was born in Cremona, Italy, on 1 January 1857. He was an artisan, and since his adolescence, he was a member of the left-wing trade unions. In 1882, Lazzari founded (with Giuseppe Croce) the Italian Workers' Party (POI).

In 1886, Lazzari commissioned Filippo Turati and Amintore Galli to compose Workers' Hymn, considered among the most significant historic songs of the Italian workers' movement.

In 1892, with Turati and Anna Kuliscioff, Lazzari founded the Italian Socialist Party (PSI) at the Genoa Congress.

Lazzari was the leader of the revolutionary wing of the Socialist Party, known as Massimalisti. In 1912, he was elected Secretary of the Socialist Party and led the party in the 1913 general election, where the PSI gained 17.6% of votes, arriving second after the governing Liberal Union of Giovanni Giolitti. In 1919, Lazzari resigned as Secretary.

In 1922, he was in favour of the PSI joining the Communist International, but refused to enter in the newly-established Communist Party (PCdI); at the end of his political career, he was in touch with the new generation of PSI leaders, above all Pietro Nenni.

After the formation of the Fascist dictatorship of Benito Mussolini, Lazzari was persecuted as a socialist and died in poverty in 1927.
