= Sant'Erasmo, Veroli =

Church and convent in Veroli, Lazio, Italy

Coordinates: 41.692978°N 13.418602°E

Sant'Erasmo is a Romanesque architecture, Roman Catholic church and convent located on Via Garibaldi in the town of Veroli, province of Frosinone, region of Lazio, Italy.

== History ==
Tradition holds that the monastery was founded around the year 1000 by St Benedict of Nursia during a trip from Subiaco abbey to Montecassino abbey.

The interior of the church has been refurbished over the ages but the exteriors maintain the Romanesque architecture, with a portico with rounded arches. The building was designed by the 12th-century architect Martinus. In 1570, a Eucharistic miracle occurred here. The church was given the title of Collegiata insigne.

Presently, the monastery functions as an inn, with the monastic rooms serving as rooms. The ancient refectory is now a restaurant.
