= Maria Fortunata Viti =

Beatified Italian nun

Blessed Maria Fortunata Viti O.S.B.
- Born: 10 February 1827 in Veroli, Italy
- Died: 20 November 1922 (aged 95) in Veroli, Italy
- Venerated in: Roman Catholic Church
- Beatified: 8 October 1967 by Pope Paul VI
- Feast: 20 November
- Patronage: Against temptation; impoverishment; loss of parents; mental illness

Maria Fortunata Viti (born Anna Felicia Viti; 10 February 1827 – 20 November 1922) was an Italian Benedictine nun who has been beatified by the Roman Catholic Church.

== Life ==
Anna Felicia Viti was born in Veroli, a comune in Italy's Province of Frosinone, on 10 February 1827. Her father was Luigi Viti, a landowner who was a gambling addict and a heavy drinker, and her mother Anna, née Bono, died when Viti was fourteen years old. The third eldest of nine children, Maria was saddled with the responsibility of raising the other children upon the death of her mother. In order to support her family, she worked as a housekeeper. Her father's alcoholism grew worse, and so Viti's employment constituted the majority of the family's income. For a while, she was wooed by a young man from Alatri, but she decided to enter religious life instead.

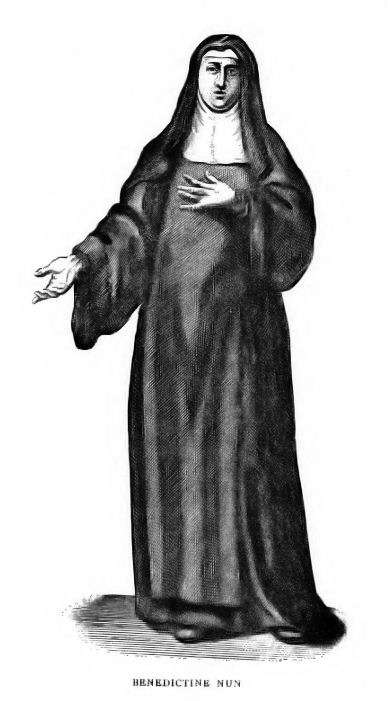
An English engraving of a Benedictine nun: Sr. Maria Fortunata lived as a nun for more than seventy years.

Viti joined the Benedictines at the Monastery of San Maria de'Franconi in Veroli on 21 March 1851, at the age of 24. After her religious profession, she took the name Maria Fortunata. Though she spent more than seventy years in the Order, she never progressed beyond the office of housekeeper: she served the monastery by spinning, sewing, washing, and mending clothing. Viti remained illiterate her entire life, but she had great devotion to the Blessed Sacrament.

At the age of 95, Viti died on 20 November 1922 in Veroli, of natural causes.

== Veneration ==
Humility: this is the virtue that Maria Fortunata personifies. This insignificance is her greatness. We are reminded of the Magnificat, and this alone speaks to Maria Fortunata's degree of Christian authenticity and the depth of her spiritual perfection. Humility is her message [...]^{[a]}

— Pope Paul VI (8 October 1967)

After Viti's death, miracles were reported at her gravesite. Also, reports of miracles were attested to during her lifetime, including certain episodes that suggest she had a gift of prophecy. According to one story, she began to cry during Mass, because she had seen that the celebrating priest would leave his calling, and she was filled with sorrow for him. She also predicted that another priest would leave the priesthood, but that he would repent and come back. In addition, two women who had been healed of meningitis in their childhood attributed their cures to her prayers.

In 1935, her remains were transferred from a mass grave to the abbey church, and the process of her canonization was begun. Viti was declared venerable on 8 April 1964 by Pope Paul VI, and beatified on 8 October 1967 by the same pope. Her feast day is on 20 November. The cause for the canonization of Viti is pending.

== Notes ==
- ^{1} In the original Italian: Umiltà: Maria Fortunata personifica questa virtù. La sua grandezza è questa piccolezza. Siamo nel quadro del Magnificat; e questo già dice il grado d'autenticità cristiana e di profondità spirituale della perfezione propria di Maria Fortunata. L'umiltà è il suo messaggio...
