= Torrice =

- Comune
- Comune di Torrice
- Coat of arms

- Location within Italy Location within Lazio
- Coordinates: 41°38′N 13°24′E
- Country: Italy
- Region: Lazio
- Province: Frosinone (FR)

Government
  - Mayor: Alfonso Santangeli

Area
  - Total: 18.2 km^{2} (7.0 sq mi)
- Elevation: 321 m (1,053 ft)

Population (28 February 2017)
  - Total: 4,787
  - Density: 263/km^{2} (681/sq mi)
- Demonym: Torriciani
- Time zone: UTC+1 (CET)
  - Summer (DST): UTC+2 (CEST)
- Postal code: 03020
- Dialing code: 0775
- Website: Official website

Torrice (Central Italian dialect: Torge) is a comune (municipality) in the Province of Frosinone in the Italian region of Lazio, located about 80 kilometres (50 mi) southeast of Rome and about 4 kilometres (2.5 mi) east of Frosinone.

Torrice borders the municipalities of Arnara, Boville Ernica, Frosinone, Ripi and Veroli.

== History ==
Founded in the Middle Ages, the city was subjected to the authority of the papal authority. In 1870, it was therefore annexed to the kingdom and became part of the province of Frosinone in 1927.
