= Pofi =

- Comune
- Comune di Pofi
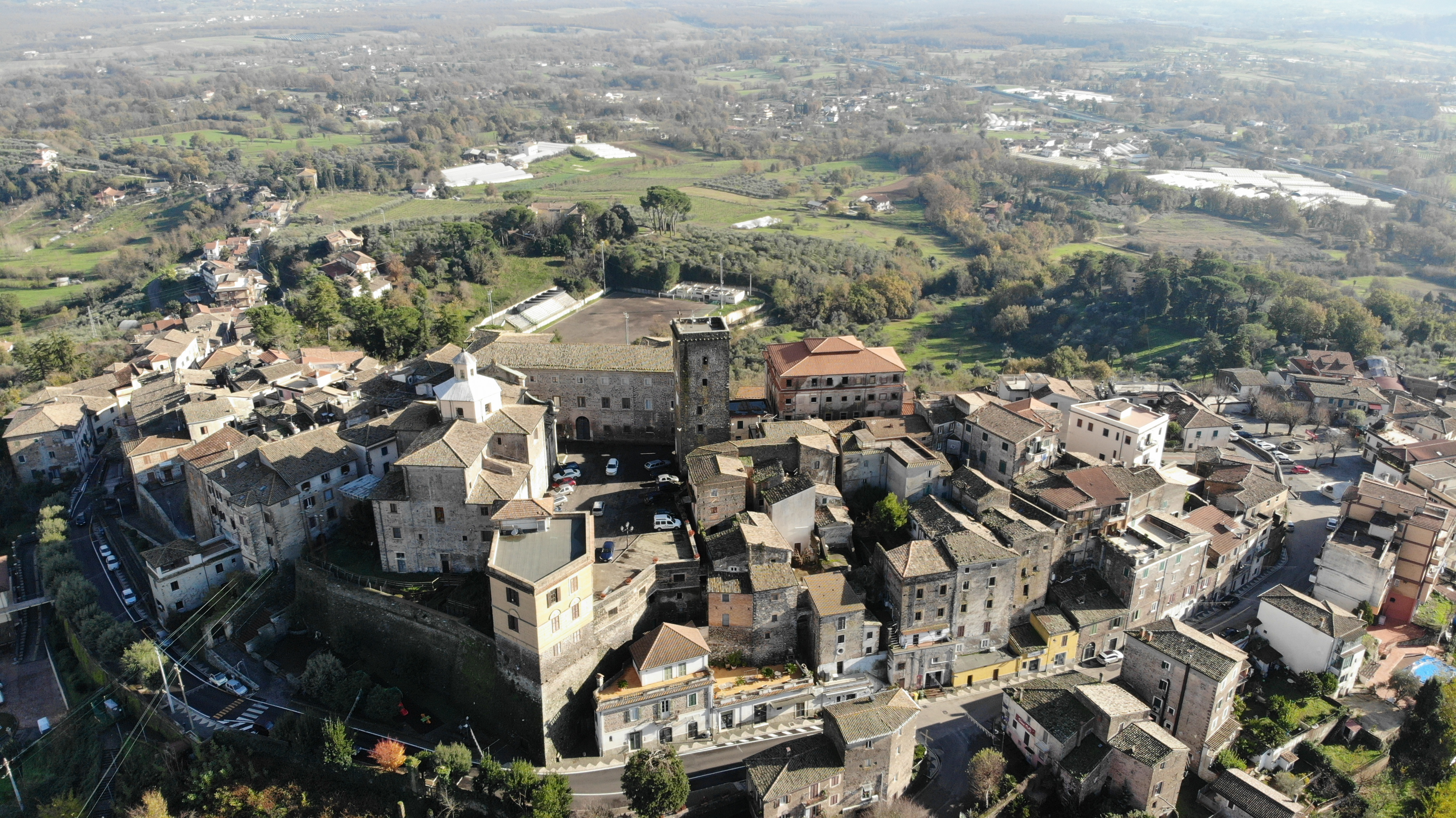
- View of Pofi

- Location within Italy Location within Lazio
- Coordinates: 41°34′N 13°25′E
- Country: Italy
- Region: Lazio
- Province: Frosinone (FR)

Government
  - Mayor: Tommaso Ciccone

Area
  - Total: 30.7 km^{2} (11.9 sq mi)
- Elevation: 283 m (928 ft)

Population (28 February 2017)
  - Total: 4,179
  - Density: 136/km^{2} (353/sq mi)
- Demonym: Pofani
- Time zone: UTC+1 (CET)
  - Summer (DST): UTC+2 (CEST)
- Postal code: 03026
- Dialing code: 0775
- Website: Official website

Pofi is a comune (municipality) of about 4,200 inhabitants in the province of Frosinone in the Italian region Lazio, located about 80 kilometres (50 mi) southeast of Rome and about 9 kilometres (6 mi) southeast of Frosinone.

Pofi borders the following municipalities: Arnara, Castro dei Volsci, Ceccano, Ceprano, Ripi. It is located on an extinct volcano, near the Sacco river valley. Sights include the church of Sant'Antonino Martire (11th century).
