= Italian Workers' Party =

Former political party in Italy

Italian Workers' Party Partito Operaio Italiano
- Leader: Costantino Lazzari, Giuseppe Croce
- Founded: 1882
- Dissolved: 14 August 1892
- Merged into: Party of Italian Workers
- Headquarters: Milan, Italy
- Ideology: Socialism
- Political position: Left-wing
- Colours: Red

The Italian Workers' Party (Partito Operaio Italiano, POI) was a socialist political party in Italy.

It was founded in 1882 in Milan by Giuseppe Croce and Costantino Lazzari and was supported externally by the Milanese Socialist League of Filippo Turati.

The party was responsible for the Workers' Hymn, a socialist anthem written in 1886 by Turati and set to music by Amintore Galli, which is considered among the most significant historic songs of the Italian workers' movement.

In 1892, the party was merged with the Italian Revolutionary Socialist Party of Andrea Costa and the Socialist League to form the Italian Socialist Party, led by Filippo Turati. That same year, the party joined the new "Party of Italian Workers" (Partito dei Lavoratori Italiani), which changed its name in 1893 to "Socialist Party of Italian Workers" (Partito Socialista dei Lavoratori Italiani) and in 1895 to Italian Socialist Party (Partito Socialista Italiano).

According to one historian, the Italian Worker’s party was "the first real 'class' organization of respectable North Italian artisans and peasants."
