= Bandiera Rossa =

Italian socialist song

- Party anthem of the Italian Communist parties
- Lyrics: Carlo Tuzzi, 1908

Audio sample
- Bandiera Rossa, performed by a choir and wind band: file; help

"Bandiera Rossa" (Italian, 'Red Flag'), often also called "Avanti Popolo" after its opening words (also to avoid any confusion with Le tre bandiere, another socialist song), is one of the most famous songs of the Italian labour movement. It glorifies the red flag, symbol of the socialist and communist movements. The text was written by Carlo Tuzzi in 1908; the melody is taken from two Lombard folk songs.

== Versions ==
Apart from the first Italian text, there are several variants which are identified with certain socialist or communist parties. The last two lines Evviva il comunismo e la libertà were put in the text after the rise of Benito Mussolini; at the same time the original beginning Compagni avanti alla riscossa was changed to Avanti o popolo, alla riscossa. Also, the word comunismo at the end of the chorus is often replaced with socialismo, especially in more recent renderings of the song.

== Influence on other works ==
=== Art music ===
"Bandiera Rossa" was notably quoted in Frederic Rzewski's piano works The People United Will Never Be Defeated! (1975) and No Place to Go but Around (1974).

=== In popular culture ===
Covers of the song were made by the Yugoslav and Slovenian punk rock band Pankrti in 1984 on their Rdeči album (Red Album), as well as the Yugoslav and Croatian punk rock band KUD Idijoti, first on their 1986 live album Legendarni uživo (The Legendary Ones Live) and on their 1990 studio album Mi smo ovdje samo zbog para (We Are Only Here for the Money). Scottish band Tarneybackle released a version of the song as part of a medley of Spanish Civil War music. The song also appears on UK punk band Angelic Upstarts' 2002 album Sons of Sparticus.

The title of the 1986 Israeli film Avanti Popolo is taken from the song. The film's protagonists – Israeli and Egyptian soldiers, particularly unheroic in their attitudes and actions, wander the Sinai Desert in the aftermath of the 1967 War. In one notable scene, the soldiers facetiously sing the song.

== Excerpt from the text ==
First verse:
Avanti popolo, alla riscossa,
Bandiera rossa, bandiera rossa.
Avanti popolo, alla riscossa,
Bandiera rossa trionferà.

Refrain:
𝄆 Bandiera rossa la trionferà 𝄇 (3×)
Evviva il socialismo (Note: Or 'comunismo' / 'communism') e la libertà.

Forward people, to the rescue,
Red flag, red flag.
Forward people, to the rescue,
Red flag will triumph.

𝄆 Red Flag will be triumphant. 𝄇 (3×)
Long live socialism and freedom.

== Foreign-language versions ==
One of the most widely known Italian songs, "Bandiera Rossa" has been rendered in several languages including: English, Serbo-Croatian, Slovenian, German, French, Swedish, Norwegian, Danish, Turkish, Kurdish, Finnish, Icelandic, Maltese, Russian, Esperanto, Indonesian, Japanese, Arabic, Hindi, Punjabi, Vietnamese and Filipino.

== See also ==
- The Red Flag – a British socialist song
- The Standard of Revolt – originally "Le drapeau rouge" [The red flag], a French socialist and anarchist revolutionary song
- Workers' Hymn – an earlier Italian socialist anthem
- Bella ciao – another Italian partisan song
- Fischia il vento – another song associated with the Italian partisans
- Siamo i ribelli della montagna – another Italian partisan song
- Zog nit keyn mol – a Yiddish partisan song popularized during World War II
