= Ripi =

- Comune
- Comune di Ripi
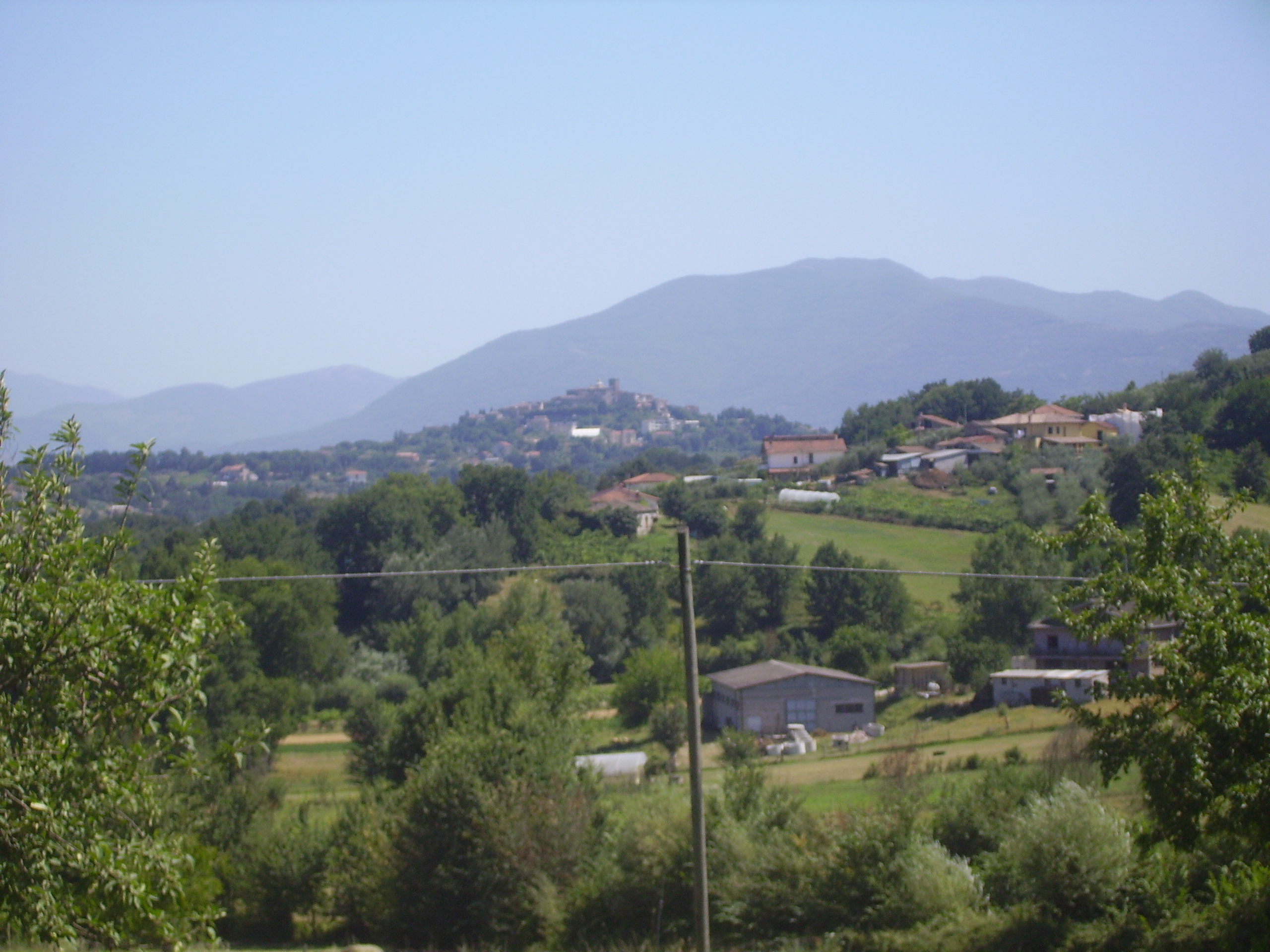
- View of Ripi

- Location within Italy Location within Lazio
- Coordinates: 41°37′N 13°26′E
- Country: Italy
- Region: Lazio
- Province: Frosinone (FR)

Government
  - Mayor: Piero Sementilli

Area
  - Total: 31.61 km^{2} (12.20 sq mi)
- Elevation: 300 m (980 ft)

Population (Dec. 2004)
  - Total: 5,256
  - Density: 166.3/km^{2} (430.7/sq mi)
- Demonym: Ripani
- Time zone: UTC+1 (CET)
  - Summer (DST): UTC+2 (CEST)
- Postal code: 03027
- Dialing code: 0775
- Website: Official website

Ripi is a comune (municipality) in the Province of Frosinone in the Italian region Lazio, located about 80 kilometres (50 mi) southeast of Rome and about 7 kilometres (4 mi) east of Frosinone.

Ripi borders the following municipalities: Arnara, Boville Ernica, Ceprano, Pofi, Strangolagalli, Torrice, Veroli.
