= Avanti Popolo (1986 film) =

1986 film

- Directed by: Rafi Bukai
- Written by: Rafi Bukai
- Starring: Salim Dau
- Release date: 1986 (Locarnodf)
- Running time: 84 minutes
- Country: Israel
- Language: Arabic

Avanti Popolo (Hebrew: אוונטי פופולו) is a 1986 Israeli drama film directed by Rafi Bukai. The film was selected as the Israeli entry for the Best Foreign Language Film at the 59th Academy Awards, but was not accepted as a nominee.

The film's name is derived from the opening words of the Italian revolutionary song Bandiera Rossa (English: 'Red Flag'), which is sung by the film's protagonists, Israeli and Egyptian soldiers wandering the Sinai Desert in the aftermath of the 1967 War.

== Synopsis ==
The film takes place at the end of the Six-Day War in June 1967. Two Egyptian privates, Khaled (Salim Daw) and Rassan (Suheil Haddad), wander hopelessly in the Sinai desert. They seek to cross the Suez Canal and return safely home. Along their way, they encounter, among other things, a dead UN soldier whose jeep contains whiskey bottles which they use to quench their thirst and get drunk, and an IDF patrol which they join in their wanderings that takes on the quality of a surrealistic farce.

== Cast ==
- Salim Dau as Haled el Asmar
- Suhel Haddad as Gassan Hamada
- Tuvia Gelber as David Pozner
- Danny Segev as Yaacov Hirsh
- Dani Roth as Dani Sela
- Barry Langford as English Journalist
- Michael Koresh as Military Attache

== See also ==
- List of submissions to the 59th Academy Awards for Best Foreign Language Film
- List of Israeli submissions for the Academy Award for Best Foreign Language Film
