= Anna Kuliscioff =

Russian feminist revolutionary (1857–1925)

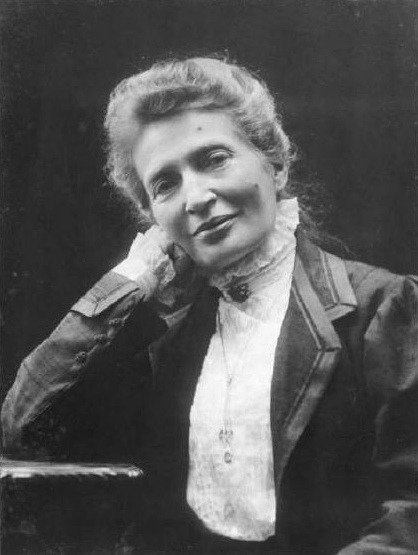
- Kuliscioff in 1908
- Born: Anna Moiseyevna Rozenshtein; 9 January 1857; Simferopol, Russia
- Died: 27 December 1925 (aged 68); Milan, Italy
- Political party: PSI (1892–1922); PSU (1922–1925)
- Spouse: Pyotr Makarevich
- Partner(s): Andrea Costa; Filippo Turati

Anna Kuliscioff (Italian: [ˈanna kuliʃˈʃɔf]; Russian: Анна Кулишёва, IPA: [anːə kʊlʲɪˈʂovə]; born Anna Moiseyevna Rozenshtein; Анна Моисеевна Розенштейн; 9 January 1857 – 27 December 1925) was a Russian-born Italian revolutionary, a prominent feminist, an anarchist influenced by Mikhail Bakunin, and eventually a Marxist socialist militant. She was mainly active in Italy, where she was one of the first women to graduate in medicine.

== Biography ==
Anna Kuliscioff was born Anna Moiseevna Rozenstejn in 1857 near Simferopol, in Crimea. She was the daughter of a wealthy Jewish family of merchants who guaranteed her a happy and dedicated childhood, so much so that she attended courses in philosophy at the University of Zurich in Switzerland. Her father, Moisei, was one of the five hundred privileged Jewish "merchants of the first guild" who were permitted to reside anywhere in the Russian Empire.

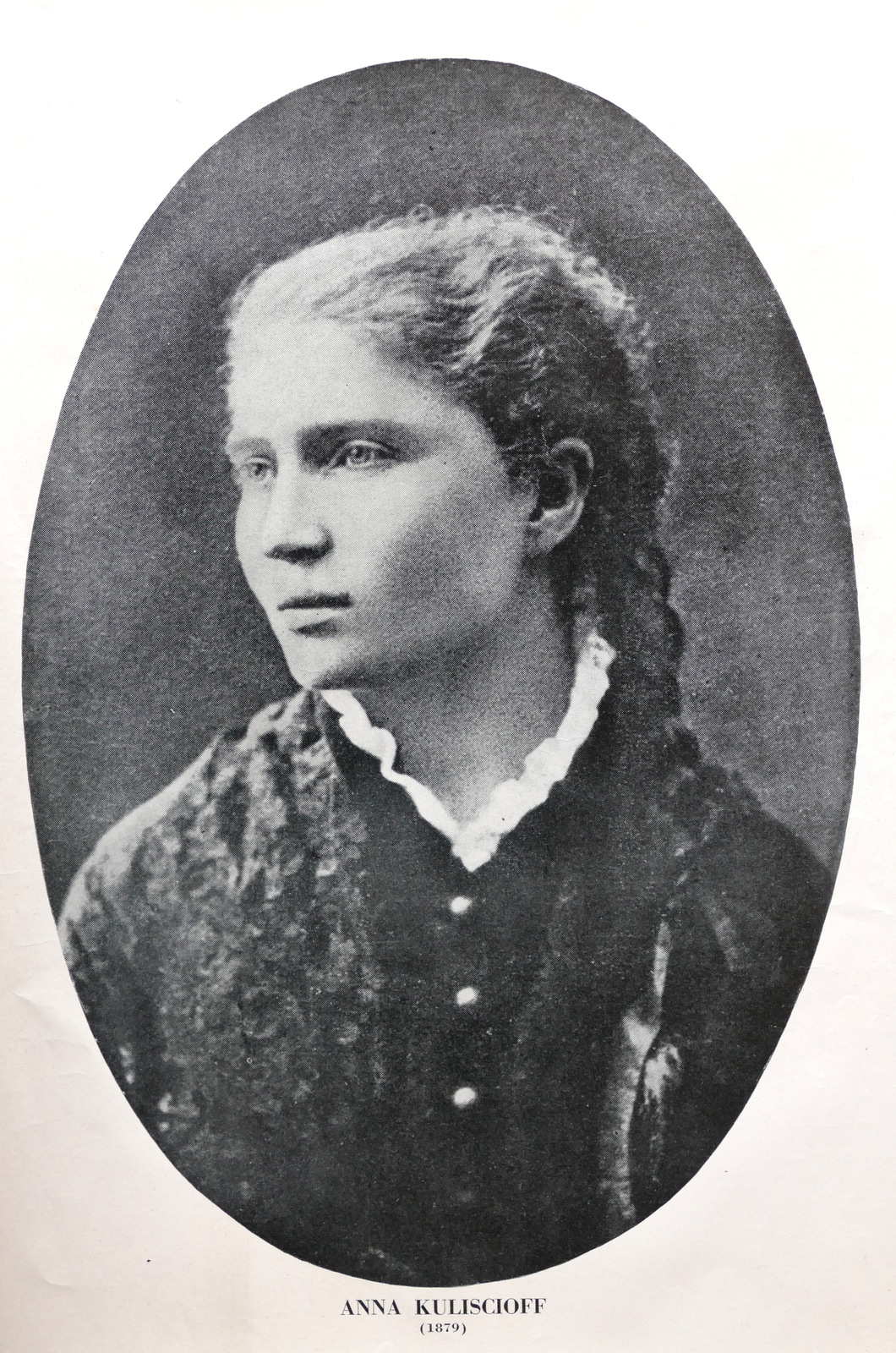
Anna Kuliscioff in her youth

She was said to have an extraordinary memory and a predisposition to logic and reasoning. Encouraged from childhood to pursue studies with private teachers and rulers, she became interested in politics early.

In 1871, after studying foreign languages with private tutors, Kuliscioff was sent to study engineering at the Zürich Polytechnic, where she additionally took courses in philosophy. Political outcasts, in whom the city flourished, acquainted her with rebel and egalitarian thoughts. Deserting her investigations, in 1873 she married Pyotr Makarevich, an individual progressive of honourable birth, and together they went back to Russia. There they worked for progressive groups, first in Odessa and afterward in Kiev.

In 1874, Makarevich was condemned to five years of hard labour for his revolutionary activity. He died in jail. To avoid arrest, Anna escaped from Odessa to live clandestinely, first in Kiev and then in Kharkov, frequently singing in public parks to make money. In Kiev, she aligned herself with revolutionaries associated with the Land and Freedom party, who engaged in terrorist acts against the tsarist authorities. When her colleagues in this armed group were arrested, she managed to escape.

In April 1877, using a false passport, she left Russia and moved to Paris, where she became a member of a small anarchist group which, following Bakunin, preached the abolition of the state. One of the members was an Italian, Andrea Costa, with whom she had a relationship that endured for a very long time. During that period they were continually isolated by detainment and outcast. It was in Paris that Anna was first reported, in police records, as bearing the name Kuliscioff, a created name that distinguished her as coming from the East.

After being expelled from France in 1878, she settled in Italy and became the editor of Critica Sociale, a major socialist paper, in 1891. An activist for causes such as women's suffrage, Anna Kuliscioff was tried and imprisoned on several occasions. Her views on Marxism influenced Filippo Turati, who became her partner. Together, they contributed to the creation of the Italian Socialist Party (PSI) as leaders of a reformist wing that came to oppose both Communism (causing the split of the new Italian Communist Party in 1921) and the irredentist attitudes of Benito Mussolini (who subsequently left the PSI). Their group was itself expelled from the PSI later in 1921, leading to the creation of a Unitary Socialist Party (PSU) – led by Turati, Kuliscioff, and Giacomo Matteotti, in opposition to the emergence of Fascism.

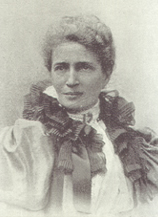
Anna Kuliscioff in 1907

Romantically involved firstly with Andrea Costa and then with Filippo Turati, whom she both "converted" to Marxism. For this reason she was later defined as "the strong woman of Italian socialism". In 1947, a journalist of the Italian newspaper Corriere della Sera, Carlo Silvestri, declared: "the best political brain of Italian socialism was actually one of the most pleasant and proud women, in front of whom there was no one who, respectful and admiring, did not bend over, including Mussolini".

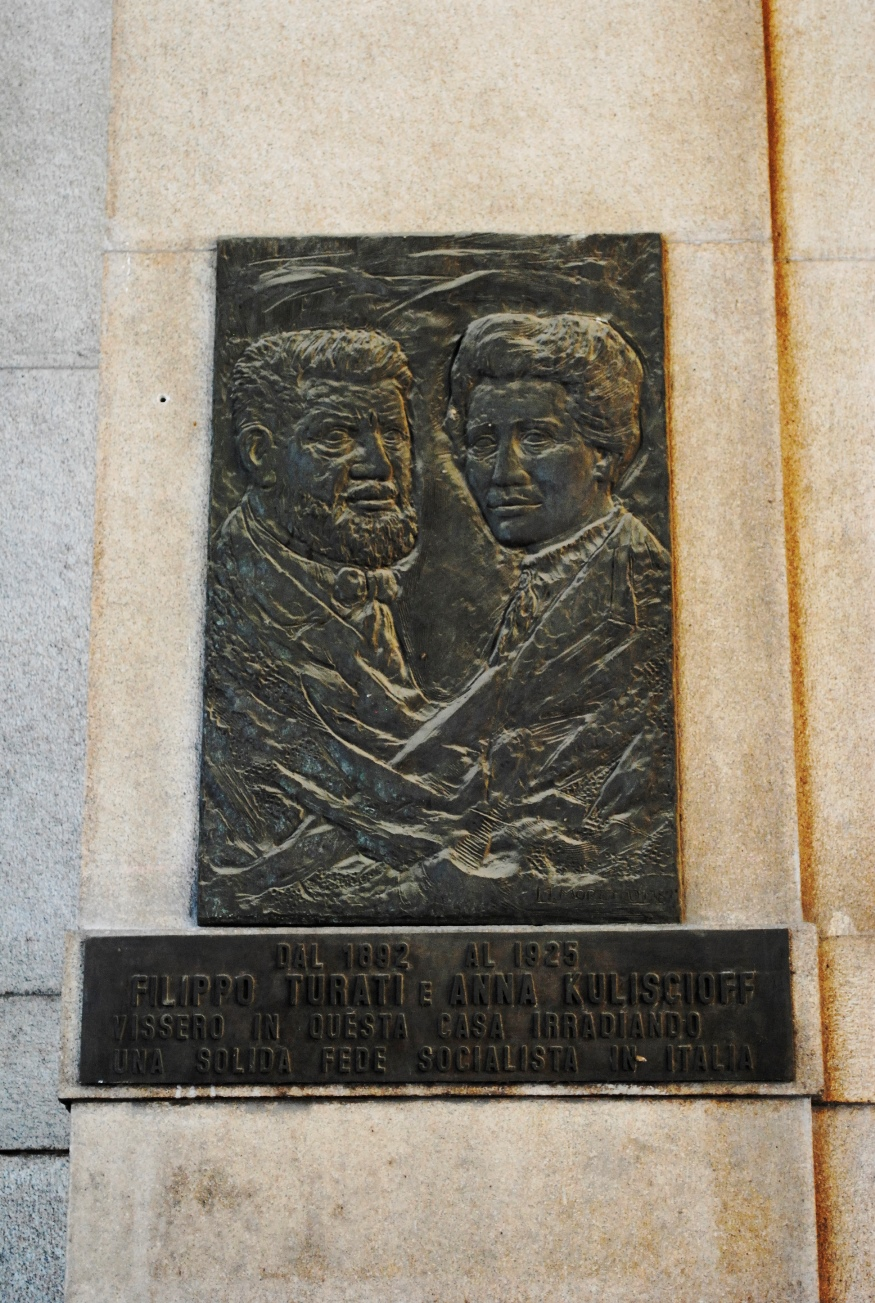
Filippo Turati and Anna Kuliscioff's bas-relief, Piazza Duomo, Milan, 1987

In 1912 Giovanni Giolitti's government rejected the opportunity to enfranchise women by introducing a law which granted the vote only to males, even illiterate ones, despite the fact that illiteracy was cited as among the reasons for not extending the vote to women. For Anna Kuliscioff this affair begins a dark period of discouragement and a sense of abandonment. In her relationship with Turati, political dissensions mix with personal issues, disturbing their quiet life. The last years of Kuliscioff's life were marked by much bitterness, many health problems, splits within the Socialists, and the rise of the Fascist Party. Anna Kuliscioff died on 27 December 1925. Violence accompanied her funeral procession through the streets of central Milan on 29 December, when some fascists, hurling themselves against the carriages and tearing the drapes and crowns, transformed the funeral into a declaration of war.

== Medical career ==
Because of her early lack of political commitment, Kuliscioff initially devoted herself to university studies. In 1882 she was forced to move to Switzerland where she enrolled in the faculty of medicine. Medicine satisfied her need to withdraw into an individual dimension and satisfied her aspiration for a social mission. Because of the long time spent in prison, she had contracted tuberculosis and milder climates were recommended. Thus she moved, with her daughter Andreina Costa, to Naples in 1884.

Due to bureaucratic inertia, it was decided to continue the experimental work elsewhere. She first went to the city of Turin where she met Cesare Lombroso (1835–1909) and his daughters Paola (1872–1954) and Gina (1872–1944) and then to the city of Pavia, in 1885, where she attended one of the most prestigious laboratories, that of the future Nobel laureate Camillo Golgi. She decided to prepare her graduation thesis focusing into a particularly demanding field such as epidemiology, devoting herself to the study of the pathogenesis of puerperal fevers which represented one of the main female causes of death: a particularly stimulating field of research and in clear development both as a result of the discoveries of microbiology and the appearance, also in Italy, of significant developments of a political nature in hygienic rehabilitation. This involved the affirmation of a concept of "social medicine", strongly characterized by a democratic and socialistic ideology. She concluded her thesis with the audacious hypothesis that the agent of the infection is to be identified not so much in a streptococcus, as supposed by Louis Pasteur (1822–1895), but in microorganisms of another nature, the proteins of putrefaction. Golgi first supported Kuliscioff's hypothesis; however, already in the following year, she was denied by other collaborators of her laboratory in Pavia. Her graduation thesis is her only scientific publication, published in the "Gazzetta degli Ospedali".

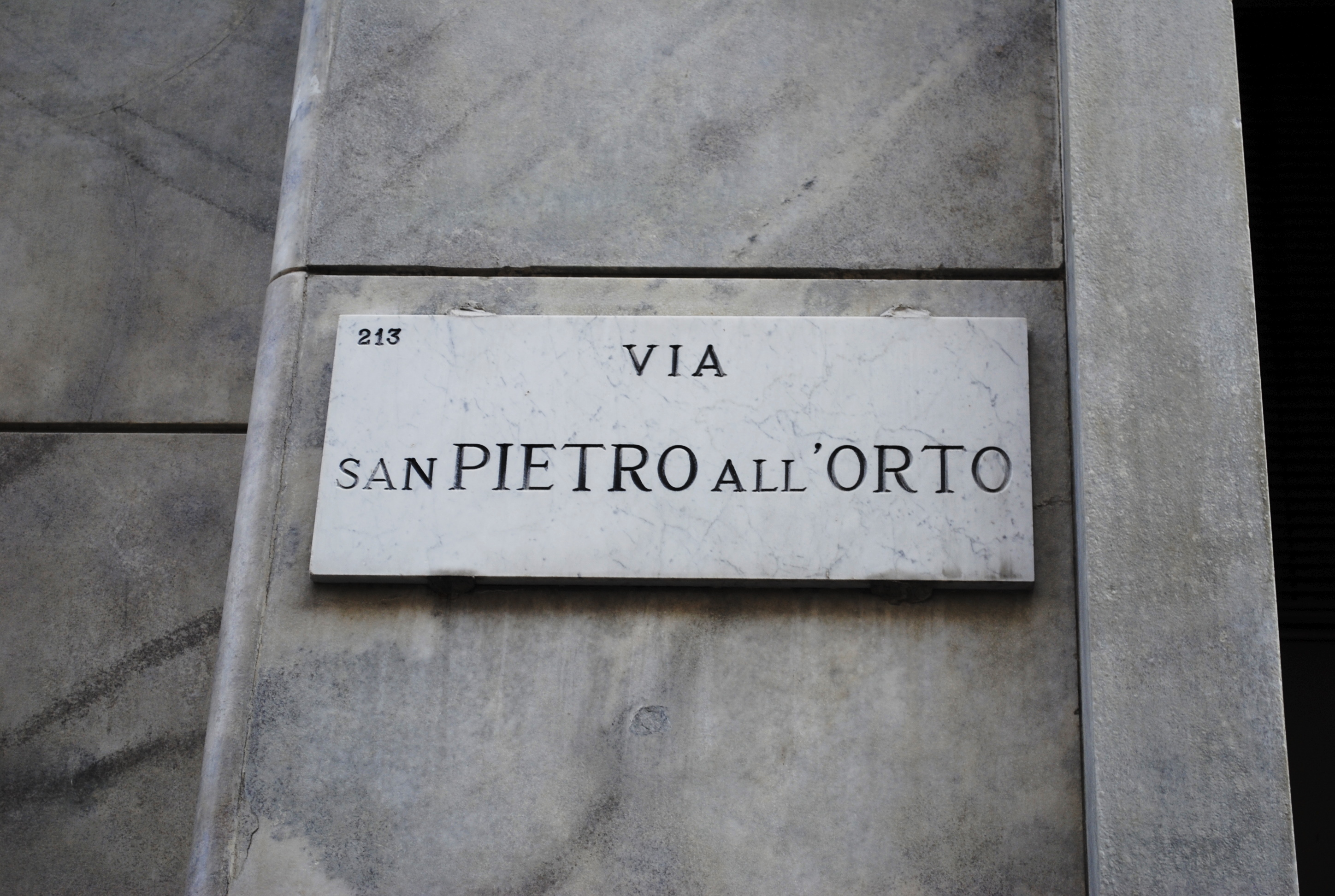
Anna Kuliscioff's first house, Milan

After completing her graduation thesis, she returned to the University of Naples and in 1886 graduated in medicine and surgery. After graduating in medicine, she moved again in 1887, this time to specialize in the medical clinic of Achille De Giovanni (1838–1916) in Padua. In 1888 she specialized in gynaecology, first in Turin, then in Padua. The choice to concentrate her own studies in the field of gynaecology appears as a demonstration of Kuliscioff's fidelity to the feminist cause. Thus Kuliscioff could find a link between professional and political activity. During these years she had been in a relationship with Filippo Turati. She decided to move to Milan with him. She tried to get hired as a doctor at the Maggiore Hospital, but she was rejected because she was a woman.

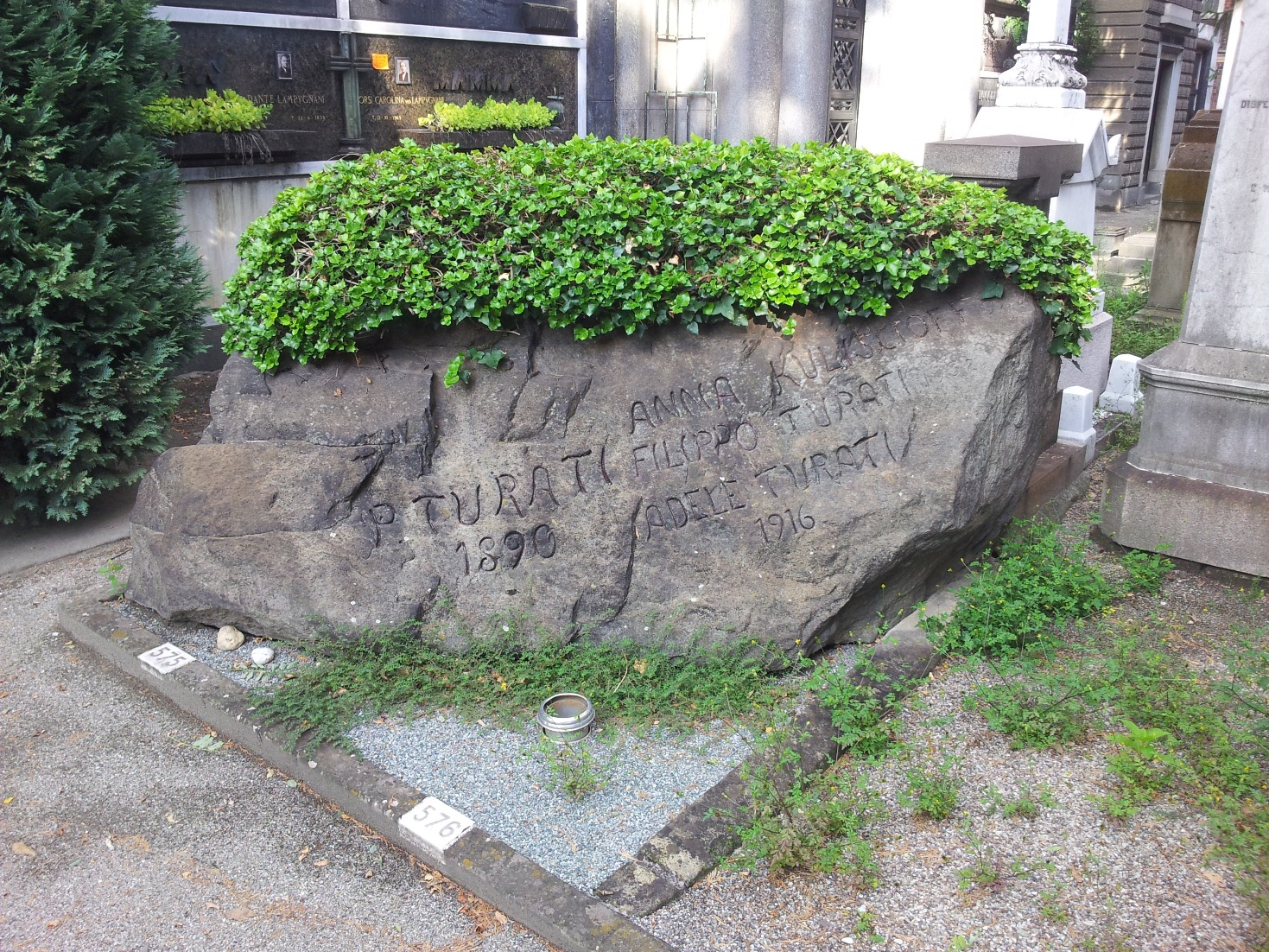
Anna Kuliscioff's tomb, Monumental Cemetery of Milan

After both her academic career and that of a hospital doctor, she began her career as a "doctor of the poor" in via San Pietro all'Olmo 18. She offered free medical assistance to poor women. The profession of doctor of the poor forced her to be a spectator of the miserable living conditions of the Milan workers. She wanted to intervene politically in this field. Becoming a "doctor of the poor" appeared to her as a sort of force of will. She was truly admired for her work; her daily visits were expected as a blessing, in fact it was not a visit from a doctor, it was something more. Anna Kuliscioff was considered a comforter, a friend, trustworthy woman of those who suffered and their beloved. Her patients described her as a woman who was able to penetrate the depths of souls. She treated the poor people with affectionate familiarity. Kuliscioff did not dedicate her care only to the poor, in fact, even the ladies of the bourgeoisie entrusted themselves to her care. Unfortunately this didn't last for too long due to her physical conditions. She retired to her home where she continued her lively political militancy. During the 20th century, the presence of women, first in medical schools and later in hospitals and every healthcare facility, registered a slow but constant increase.

== Selected works ==
- Il monopolio dell'uomo: conferenza tenuta nel circolo filologico milanese, Milan, Critica sociale, 1894 (The Monopoly of Man, trans. Lorenzo Chiesa (MIT Press, 2021))
- Il voto alle donne: polemica in famiglia per la propaganda del suffragio universale in Italia, Milan, Uffici della critica sociale, 1910 (with Filippo Turati, in Italian)
- Proletariato femminile e Partito socialista: relazione al Congresso nazionale socialista 1910, Milan, Critica sociale, 1910 (in Italian)
- Donne proletarie, a voi...: per il suffragio femminile, Milan, Società editrice Avanti!, 1913 (in Italian)
- Lettere d'amore a Andrea Costa, 1880–1909, Milan, Feltrinelli, 1976 (in Italian)
- Amore e socialismo. Un carteggio inedito, La nuova Italia, 2001 (with Filippo Turati, in Italian)
