= Edoardo Sonzogno =

Italian publisher

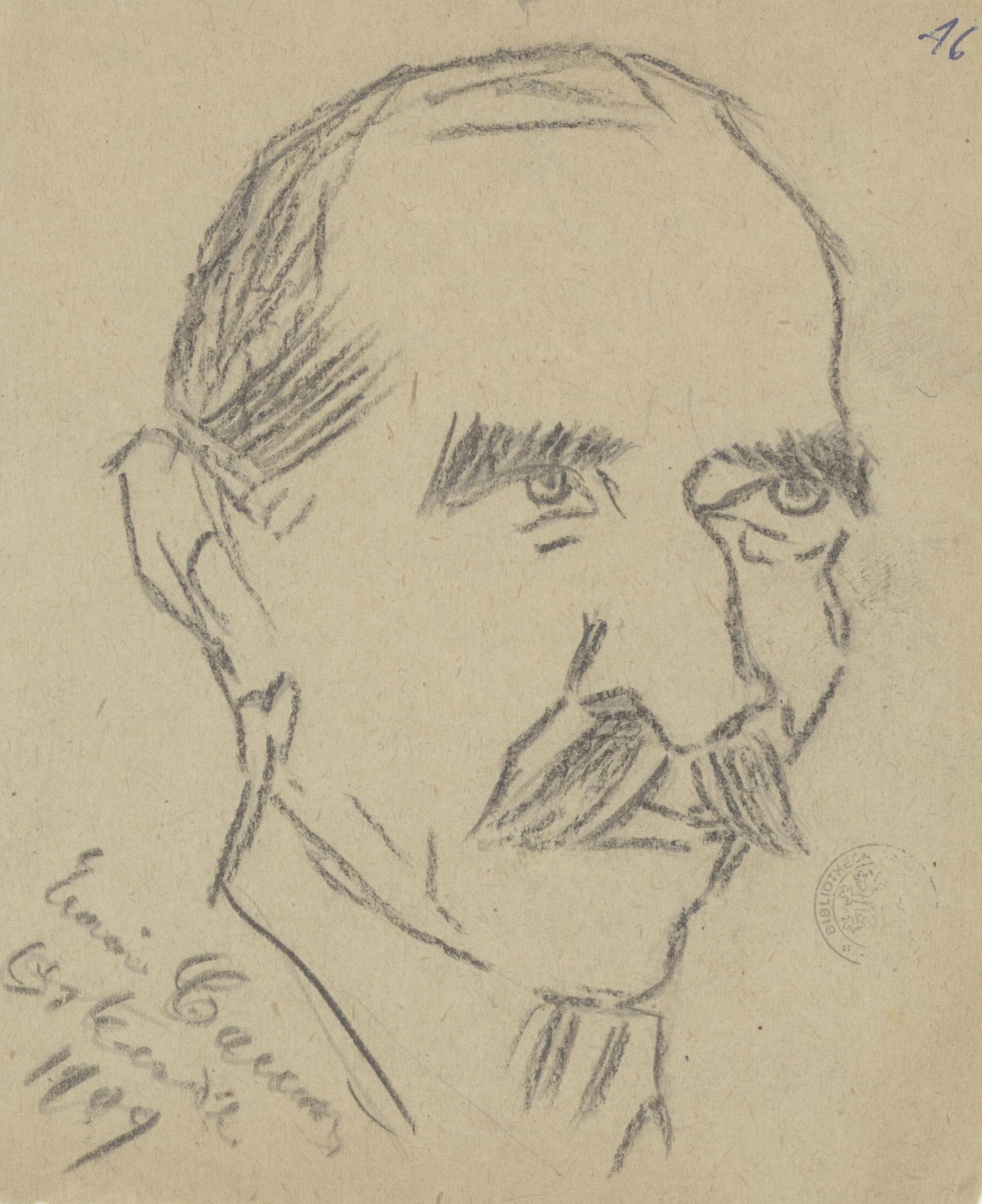
More than likely Edoardo Sonzogno drawn by Enrico Caruso, 1909, Ghent University Library

Edoardo Sonzogno (Italian pronunciation: [edoˈardo sonˈdzoɲɲo]; 21 April 1836 – 14 March 1920) was an Italian publisher.

A native of Milan, Sonzogno was the son of a businessman who owned a publisher, Casa Sonzogno, and a bookstore. Sonzogno owned and directed the newspaper Il Secolo from 1861 until 1909. For much of that time, its editor was Ernesto Teodoro Moneta.

After inheriting his father's business, in 1874, Sonzogno opened a musical establishment, Casa Musicale Sonzogno, for which he appointed Amintore Galli as its artistic director. Galli sought to establish an editorial line distinct from those of Casa Ricordi and Francesco Lucca, Sonzogno's closest competitors, by publishing monthly series of, in Galli's words, "a collection of economically priced masterworks by the great maestri".

In April 1883, Il Secolo announced a competition for a new, unperformed opera "inspired by the best traditions of Italian opera", which could be "idyllic, serious, or comic", to be judged by a panel including Galli and Amilcare Ponchielli. The competition had two winners: Luigi Mapelli's Anna e Gualberto and Guglielmo Zuelli's La fata del nord. Notably, Giacomo Puccini's Le villi was disqualified for the illegibility of its manuscript. The opera was taken over by Giulio Ricordi, the competitor of Sonzogno.

The second competition was advertised in July 1888, to be judged by a panel including Galli and Antonio Ghislanzoni. Mascagni's Cavalleria rusticana won first prize against seventy-two other operas, including Niccola Spinelli's Labilia and Vincenzo Ferroni's Rudello.

In 1894 he established a theater, the Lirico Internazionale, in Milan. He was also one of the first publishers in Italy to launch pocket-book editions of a huge range of classical authors from all over the world, a collection he called Biblioteca Universale. The price of these minibooks (11.5 × 17.5 cm) was so low, from 1 to 3.5 lire, that anybody could easily afford a personal library of classics, fiction and non-fiction.

Sonzogno died in Milan in 1920.

== Sources ==
- Ewen, David (1971). Encyclopedia of the Opera. Hill and Wang. ISBN 9780809072620.
