= Filippo Turati =

Italian politician (1857–1932)

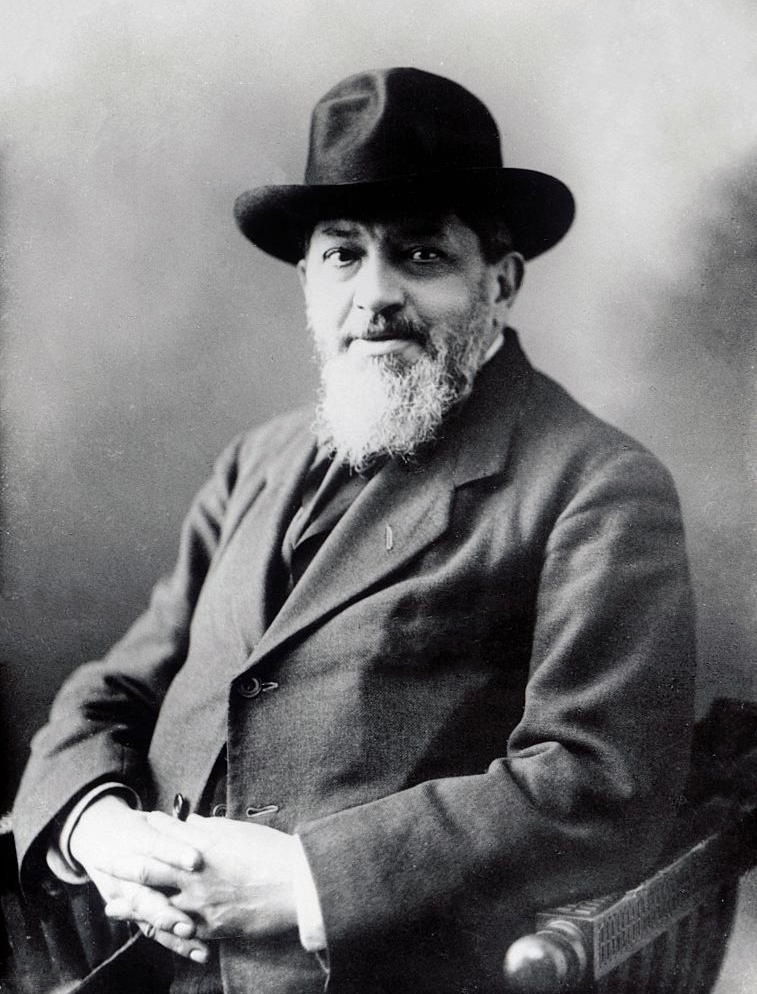
- Turati c. 1920

Member of Chamber of Deputies
- In office 15 June 1896 – 9 November 1926
- Constituency: Milan

Personal details
- Born: 26 November 1857 Canzo, Kingdom of Lombardy–Venetia
- Died: 29 March 1932 (aged 74) Paris, France
- Party: POI (1886–1892); PSI (1892–1922); PSU (1922–1930)
- Domestic partner: Anna Kulischov
- Occupation: Jurist, poet, journalist, politician

Filippo Turati (Italian: [fiˈlippo tuˈraːti]; 26 November 1857 – 29 March 1932) was an Italian sociologist, criminologist, poet and socialist politician.

== Early life ==
Born in Canzo, province of Como, he graduated in law at the University of Bologna in 1877, and participated in the Scapigliatura movement with the most important artists of the period in Milan. Turati became interested in politics, being attracted to the democratic movement before joining the more specific socialist groups.

In 1886, Turati wrote the words of the Workers' Hymn, a popular socialist anthem that was set to music by Amintore Galli, and is considered among the most significant historic songs of the Italian workers' movement. By this time, Turati was associated with the Milanese Socialist League, a supporting group of Costantino Lazzari's Italian Workers' Party. Turati was reluctant to compose the anthem, but was persuaded by his mother, Adele. He was ashamed of the final text, and promised Lazzari, who commissioned it, that he would rewrite it, but Lazzari accepted it. The anthem was published on 7 March 1886 in Milanese newspaper La Farfalla, crediting Turati. Despite the anthem's success, Turati later called the anthem "a juvenile poetic sin", retorting in his 1898 trial:

They have put me on trial so many times for those verses as incitements for class hatred. Instead, they should have sentenced me to death for inciting a crime against Poetry.

His most important sociological work of this period is Il Delitto e la Questione Sociale, in which he examines how social conditions affect crime. He met Anna Kulischov while working on a survey of social conditions in Naples. Kulischov was an exile from Russia who had become the companion of Andrea Costa, an Anarchist leader – when she converted to non-Anarchist Socialism, Costa followed, sending an important letter to his anarchist comrades in which he abandoned the movement. Kulischov and Costa had split by the time she met Turati. The two immediately fell in love, and lived together until her death in 1925.

In France, Turati had a close relationship with the Italian lawyer Giuseppe Leti (1866–1939), former head of the Supreme Council of the Scottish Rite national Freemasonry who resided in France from 1929 to 1937. Leti was familiar with other Italian anti-fascist politicians such as Francesco Saverio Nitti, Alberto Cianca, Pietro Nenni, Emanuele Modigliani and Emilio Lussu.

== Socialist Party ==
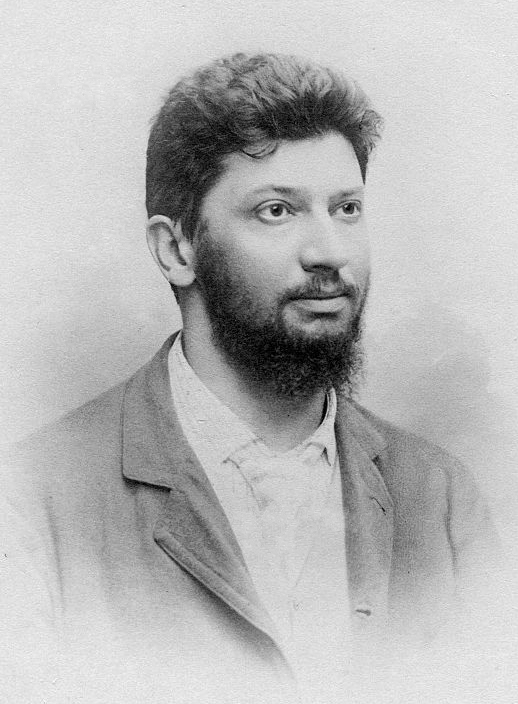
Filippo Turati during 1890s

Turati and Anna Kulischov were the most instrumental intellectuals involved in the founding of the Italian Socialist Party (PSI) in 1892 (it took that name in 1895). They were reformists, believing that Socialism would come about gradually, primarily through action in the Italian Parliament, labour organization, and education, spreading their ideas through their journal Critica Sociale – a review founded by their friend Arcangelo Ghisleri under the title Cuore e Critica. It was the most influential Marxist review in Italy before World War I. Shut down by Benito Mussolini's Fascist regime, it was reestablished after World War II and is still in print.

In the years following the party's foundation, the Italian government attempted to suppress it. Turati advocated alliances with other Italian democratic forces, meant to defeat the government's reactionary policies, and to advance left-wing causes. In 1898 Turati was arrested and charged with being the inspirator of the popular riot that broke out in the whole country against the rise of the bread price. He was freed the following year.

Under Prime Minister Luigi Pelloux, the country was governed by highly conservative politicians who were met with stiff resistance from the left, and in 1899 they were defeated thanks in large part to the PSI's policies. In 1901, Giuseppe Zanardelli, a Liberal, became Prime Minister – accompanied by Giovanni Giolitti as the Minister of the Interior – Giolitti who would dominate Italian politics until 1915. This Liberal cabinet risked losing a vote in Parliament, with the possibility that a more conservative politician, Sidney Sonnino, would come to power; Turati urged that the Socialist deputies vote for the Zanardelli government. When the party Directorate refused to sanction the vote, he convinced the deputies to do so anyway.

The vote brought the incipient split in the party between right and left wings to a head, even if the Liberal government had allowed workers the right to strike, and despite the fact that the subsequent strike wave resulted in improved conditions in industry and on the land. Between 1901 and 1906, power in the party seesawed between the Turati-led reformists and the revolutionaries under various leaders. After 1906, splits surfaced among the reformists themselves. In 1912, as a result of the Socialist reaction against the Italo-Turkish War (1911–1912), revolutionaries took over the party. Benito Mussolini, one of their leaders, became editor of the party newspaper Avanti!; Turati opposed Mussolini, but proved unable to dislodge him. He had opposed the conflict, and would oppose Italy's entrance into World War I – while Mussolini moved to an irredentist position (and came to be expelled from the PSI after arguing for Italy to join the Entente Powers). Despite the fact that he was a pacifist in June 1918 he strongly supported the Italian Army that was fighting the Battle of Solstizio.

== Opposition to Fascism ==
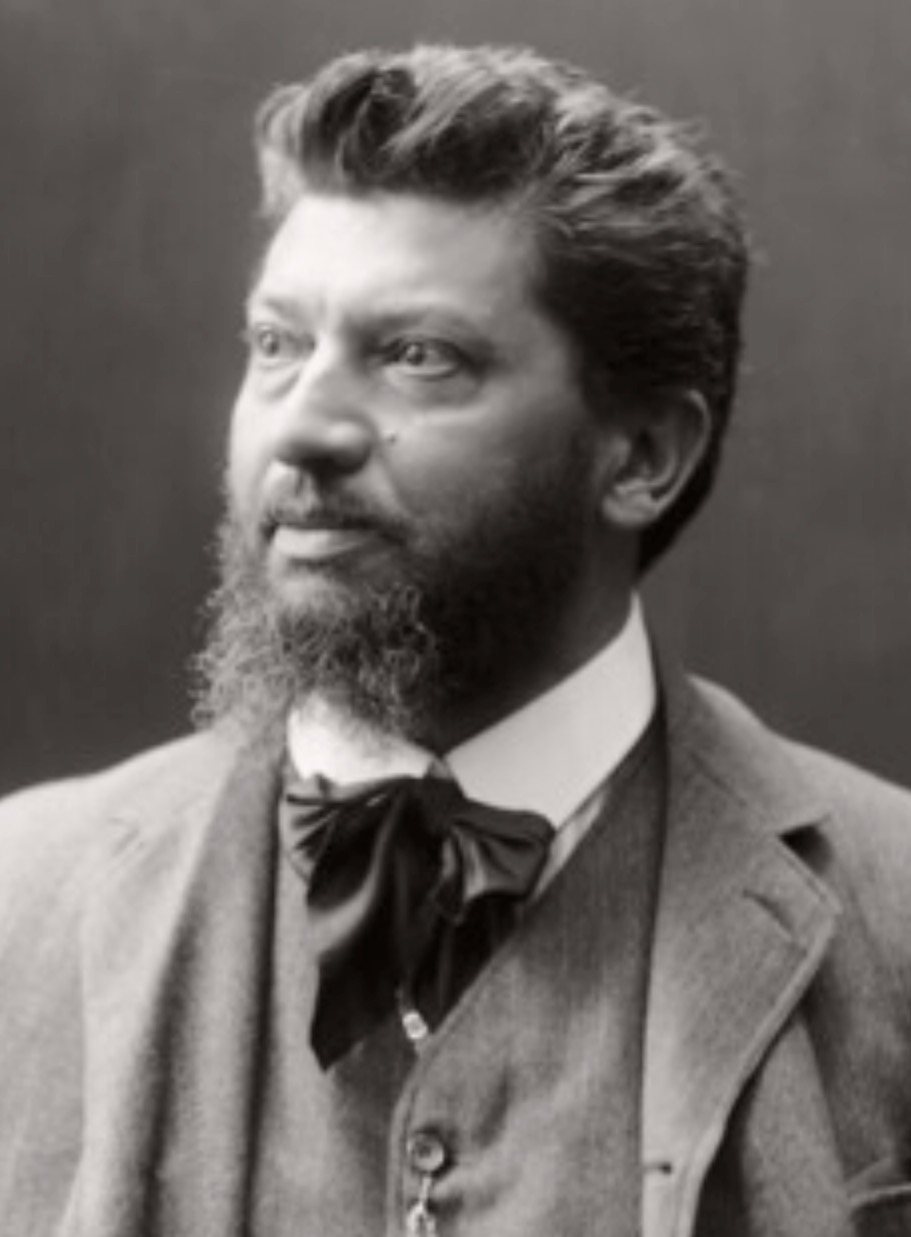
An official portrait of Turati

Following World War I, Mussolini created the paramilitary Fasces of Revolutionary Action, then renamed Fasces of Italian Combat in 1919 and finally National Fascist Party in 1921, and he came to power in 1922 (after the March on Rome). Filippo Turati and Anna Kulischov, who knew Mussolini well, were major opponents of fascism, and lived under constant surveillance and threats. In a series of prescient speeches, Turati argued that the new revolutionary program adopted by the PSI in 1919 would lead to disaster, and he advocated political alliances with other opponents of Fascism. This policy was rejected and the PSI split in 1921, with the formation of the Communist Party of Italy. In 1922, Turati's group was expelled and a new group, the Unitary Socialist Party (PSU), was established. In 1924, Turati's disciple and Secretary of the PSU, Giacomo Matteotti, was assassinated by Mussolini's Ceka; this seminal event prompted Mussolini to formalize his dictatorship between 1925 and 1926.

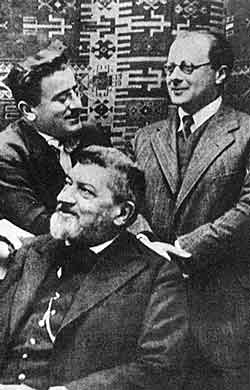
Turati with Claudio Treves and Carlo Rosselli in Paris

In 1926, Turati fled Italy in a dramatic escape to France – aided by Riccardo Bauer, Carlo Rosselli, Ferruccio Parri, Sandro Pertini (the future President of the Italian Republic) and Adriano Olivetti, of the eponymous typewriter company. In Paris, he was the soul of the non-Communist anti-fascist resistance, travelling across Europe and alerting democrats to the Fascist danger – which he saw as a phenomenon with far-reaching consequences. He died in the French capital in March 1932.

After World War II, Turati's remains were transferred to Milan's Cimitero Monumentale, where he was buried next to Anna Kulischov.

In the Florestano Vancini film The Assassination of Matteotti (1973), Turati is played by Gastone Moschin.

== Electoral history ==
Election	House	Constituency	Party	Votes	Result
(1896) (Note: By-election.)	Chamber of Deputies	Milan V	PSI	2,200	Elected
1897 (Note: Declared void.)	Chamber of Deputies	Milan V	PSI	2,564	Elected
(1899) (Note: Declared void.)	Chamber of Deputies	Milan V	PSI	4,343	Elected
(1899)	Chamber of Deputies	Milan V	PSI	4,346	Elected
1900	Chamber of Deputies	Milan V	PSI	5,883	Elected
1904	Chamber of Deputies	Milan V	PSI	4,572	Elected
1909	Chamber of Deputies	Milan V	PSI	5,225	Elected
1913	Chamber of Deputies	Milan V	PSI	13,506	Elected
1919	Chamber of Deputies	Milan	PSI	—N/a	Elected
1921	Chamber of Deputies	Milan	PSI	—N/a	Elected
1924	Chamber of Deputies	Milan	PSU	—N/a	Elected
