= Veroli =

- Comune
- Comune di Veroli
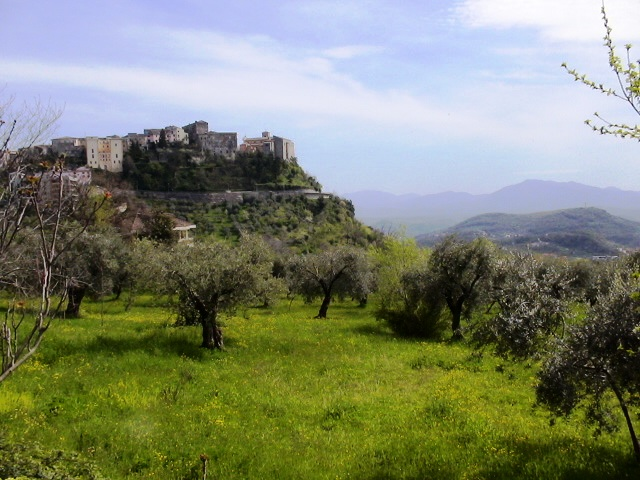
- View of Veroli

- Coat of arms

- Location within Italy Location within Lazio
- Coordinates: 41°41′N 13°25′E
- Country: Italy
- Region: Lazio
- Province: Frosinone (FR)
- Frazioni: see list

Government
  - Mayor: Germano Caperna

Area
  - Total: 120 km^{2} (46 sq mi)
- Elevation: 594 m (1,949 ft)

Population (31 December 2010)
  - Total: 20,798
  - Density: 170/km^{2} (450/sq mi)
- Demonym: Verolani
- Time zone: UTC+1 (CET)
  - Summer (DST): UTC+2 (CEST)
- Postal code: 03029
- Dialing code: 0775
- Patron saint: Santa Maria Salome
- Saint day: May 25
- Website: Official website

Veroli (Latin: Verulae) is a town and comune in the province of Frosinone, Lazio, central Italy, in the Latin Valley.

== History ==
Veroli (Verulae) became a Roman municipium in 90 BC. It became the seat of a bishopric in 743 AD, and was occupied by Spanish soldiers, allied to the Colonna family, in the 16th century.

== Main sights ==
Veroli retains elements of its ancient polygonal nucleus, especially near the summit of the hill, later occupied by a medieval castle. The Cathedral's treasury contains the breviary of St. Louis of Toulouse, and some interesting reliquaries, one in ivory with bas-reliefs, and two in the Gothic style, of silver gilt. Near Veroli is the Gothic Abbey of Casamari. In Via Garibaldi is located Sant'Erasmo, a Romanesque architecture, Roman Catholic church and convent. Finally the town also has the church of San Paolo Apostolo.

== Bounding communes ==
- Alatri
- Balsorano
- Boville Ernica
- Collepardo
- Frosinone
- Monte San Giovanni Campano
- Morino
- Ripi
- San Vincenzo Valle Roveto
- Sora
- Torrice

== Frazioni ==
Frazioni of Veroli include: Castelmassimo, Colleberardi, Colle Ciaffone, Cotropagno, Giglio di Veroli, Madonna della Vittoria, San Giuseppe le Prata, Santa Francesca, Sant'Angelo in villa, Scifelli, Aia le monache, Bagnara, Casamari, Case Cibba, Case Cocchi, Case Fiorini, Case Gattone, Case Palmerini-Oste, Case Pinciveri, Case Ricci, Case Scaccia, Case Sciascia, Case Volpi, Casino Spani, Castello, Chiarano, Colle Capito, Colle grosso, Colle Martino, Cona dei greci, Crescenzi, Crocifisso, Fontana Fratta, Gaude, Madonna degli Angeli, Madonna del pianto, Madonna di Foiano, Ponte Vasagalli, Puppari, San Cristoforo, San Filippo, Santa Maria Amaseno, Sant'Anna, San Vito, Speluca, Stere Mancini, Tondarella, Tor dei venti, Torre Caravicchia, Tretticatore, Vado Amaseno, Valle Amaseno, Vernieri, Virano.

== People ==
- Maria Fortunata Viti
- Aonio Paleario

== Twin towns ==
- Bruck an der Mur, Austria
- Spinea, Italy
- (France) Issoire, French
