= Socialism in Italy =

Socialism in Italy is a political movement that developed during the Industrial Revolution over a course of 120 years, which came to a head during the Revolutions of 1848. At the beginning of the 20th century, there were a growing number of social changes. The outbreak of the First World War accelerated economic differentiation causing a wider wealth gap. This is seen as one of the key factors that triggered the emergence of Italian socialism.

The socialist movement has played a significant role in shaping Italy's identity. The Italian Socialist Party (PSI) was one of the first modern democratic organizations in Italy. As a main political party in twentieth-century Italy, the PSI not only significantly influenced Italy's development, but also contributed to the democratic process on a national scale.

== History ==
Due to the economic and social struggles at the beginning of the twentieth century, socialist ideas were widely accepted by the Italian working-class population during this time. National industrial systems were established to bring attention to problems in different areas, such as the wealth gap, widespread unemployment, and environmental pollution. In Italy, a series of measures were taken to eliminate the negative effects of the industrial revolution. Compared to other European countries, Italian socialism spread in the right conditions for a struggling and an impoverished Italian people to willingly engage with, understand, and accept the core spirit of socialism.

=== Biennio Rosso ===
Biennio Rosso was a two-year period between 1919 and 1920. After the First World War, it had a great impact on Italian and European socialism, and there were a great number of intense social conflicts in Italy during that time. During this period, conflicts between reformists and communist wings of the Italian Socialist Party (PSI) occurred. By late 1920, there were divisions in Italian socialism between revolutionaries and reformists. Officially, the PSI held neutral attitudes and upheld its famous ‘neither support nor sabotage’ policy.

However, the PSI divided into three main groups with different political positions: reformist, communist, and maximalist. Throughout 1918–1919, working-class unrest had increased steadily in Italy. Due to the impact of the Russian Revolution and the establishment of the Comintern, Italian workers lacked trust in their political representatives and wanted to establish a union that represented themselves. This trend was commonly regarded as the rise of mass power and inspired a tendency towards radicalism.

=== Peasant strike ===
Another important event in Italy's socialist history was the peasant strike in southern Italy. Peasants formed a defensive union against government forces to advocate for their rights. The union attacked every sign and symbol of the government. Peasants intended to voice their grievances, so they turned to “State” socialists and labor leaders to campaign and legislate fair and equal treatment. In the end, the government gave up its original plan and formed a truce with the peasants. However, a man named Spriano had a differing view. He believed that the unions should have negotiations with the government to resolve the conflicts peacefully and legally.

This peasant strike was considered an important movement because it allowed people to recognize the possibilities of direct action and it represented the beginning of the struggle for collective power. The possibility of violent action was magnified during this stage and the potential of further violent insurrections across Italy, received mass support across other Western European states.

=== Development ===
Since the First World War, the political and religious climate had changed to a large extent. After previous political movements, socialists began to pay more attention to different types of radical experiments and manifestation. Through continuous education and experience, socialists tried to create more effective reform programs or foment revolutions whether through direct or indirect action. The necessity of powerful and independent socialist movements was widely acknowledged among researchers of socialism. Also, the importance of revolutionary tactics and violence proved to be effective.

Socialists took great efforts to establish nationwide political organizations that were desperately needed in the early ages of development, with the assistance of local people. Through protracted and unremitting efforts, socialists gained support from a majority of industrial workers and had their greatest strength in industrial areas.

After a long period of development, there were still several long-standing difficulties that existed in poor social conditions since World War II. Meanwhile, social problems caused by the emergence of capitalism were increasingly serious. Therefore, faced with these insoluble difficulties, socialists in Italy could hardly find a short-term solution in contemporary society to solve them. However, socialists were convinced that with great patience and effort, they could start to tackle some of these issues.

== Political parties ==
Italian socialism divided into two major parties, the Partito Socialista Italiano (PSI), led by Pietro Nenni, and Democratico Italiano, led by Giuseppe Saragat. Both of them faced a series of problems for democratic socialism, especially the absence of a powerful and independent socialist movement after World War II.

=== Italian Socialist Party ===
The Italian Socialist Party (PSI), also known as the Italian Workers’ Party, was founded in 1892 in Genoa. It was introduced to the socialist world under the brand of the Italian Socialist Party in 1893. Later in 1988, the PSI took the name the "Italian Democratic Socialists" (Socialisti Democratici Italiani, SDI), and then in 1994, it was transformed into the Italian Socialists (Socialisti Italiani, SI). As a modern democratic organization, PSI used different tactics such as trade unions, socialist circles, and cooperative organizations to broaden its national influence. However, the PSI had financial challenges due to its unfavorable political statements. The Communists Third International and the reformist Socialist Workers International disagreed with the PSI's belief structure, which prevented PSI from obtaining much-needed financial aid from them.

From 1900 to 1920, the party's left wing (maximalists) fought over leadership with the reformists (led by Filippo Turati). The most serious conflicts between reformist and revolutionary socialists in Italy happened during the Biennio Rosso (1919-1920). However, in 1934, the PSI established an alliance with the communists and it gradually cooperated with conservative reformists, revolutionaries, and syndicalists.

In 1983, Bettino Craxi took a significant role in Italian socialist history. His first government (1983–1986) was active in the political arena for a long time, and he cooperated with the PSI to stabilize the political situation. Before the early 1990s, the PSI had a long-term partnership with centrist coalition governments. However, due to several political corruption and financial scandals during the 1994 elections, the PSI lost the controlling position in government and became a minor party.

=== Modern Italian Socialist Party ===
The modern Italian socialist party was founded in 2007–2008, following the merger of the following parties: the Italian Democratic Socialists, the New Italian Socialist Party, The Italian Socialists, Democracy and Socialism. In October 2009, the party was renamed Socialist Party (Italian: Partito Socialista, PS). As a social-democratic political party in Italy, the modern PS was active in Italian political activities for a long time. In the 2012 local elections, the party received 14.4% support from voters. However, in the 2008 general election, when the leader of the modern PSI participated in the election of the prime minister, the party obtained less than 1% of the vote, and received no positions in the Italian Parliament.

== Christianity and socialism ==
From World War II, two parties dominated the political stage until the end of the twentieth century: the Christian Democratic Party (Partito della Democrazia Cristiana; DC) and the Italian Communist Party (Partito Comunista Italiano; PCI). During the period of the industrial revolution, in addition to other similarities between Catholics and socialists, they had a shared goal related to workers' rights. Christianity and socialism both had huge influences in Italy, so the relationship between them was deeply connected to the development of their society. In the last decade of the nineteenth century, Italy was still a relatively backward country, with deep economic differences between the north and south. Due to slow economic development and a late industrialization process, the time of Italian Catholic and socialist connection was later than their other European counterparts, and socialists had missed many opportunities to establish a socialist state in Italy with the support of Catholics.

Father Carlo Maria Curcie, who was the first man who tried to tackle the challenges caused by socialism as a Catholic, made great contributions to peaceful communications between Christian and socialist groups. He studied the origins of the Church and tried to conclude that Christian ethics were compatible with the spiritual core of socialism. In his opinion, Christianity and socialism should consider the possibility of exchanging cultural and political proposals, and working simultaneously for political and religious innovation.

In the mid-1950s, the PSI desired collaboration with the Christian Democrats and the communists. Initially, the socialists' bargaining power was limited, so they had to cope with Christian Democrats to guarantee Italy's govern ability. A growing number of socialists understood the necessity of communications with Catholics, and tried to find an appropriate track to have an alliance with them. They reached a consensus on the opinion that establishing an alliance between two authoritarian organizations was an effective solution to improve the dilapidated social conditions. From 1945 to 1947 Communists, Socialists, and Christian Democrats shared the responsibilities of power, while they also strengthened their own positions during the period of collaboration. Christian Democracy built power centers in every area in Italy, from urban to rural, rich to poor. Meanwhile, socialism and social democracy mainly focused on the northern areas and the south of Rome. But in 1963, the PSI joined a Christian Democratic government.

== Influences on Italy ==
Bakunin, who was the first man in Italy to explore socialism, is regarded as one of the greatest leaders of the worldwide movement of today. His work has deeply influenced Italy and the rest of the world, and his teaching has helped Italians understand anarchism, which originated in Germany with Marx. His activities also motivated other people to fight for their rights, especially the working classes. They felt an urgent desire to form an open, free, and democratic socialist organization, which could contribute to the development of democratic processes in Italy. Moreover, his beliefs brought to light more challenges to the capitalist system than ever before.

Following previous pioneers’ action, a great number of socialists were effective in breaking social barriers and reforming societies for a better future. They used trade unions, co-operative societies, and parties to progress the labor movement. The socialist parties produced radical political and economic reform to solve the problems of contemporary society. Finally, they achieved their goal of a radical transformation of society. Moreover, they contributed to Italy's economic and social modernization, and succeeded in solidifying socialism's social and geographical bases. More and more young socialists engaged in political movements to strengthen the next generation's faith in social democracy, which prepared them for modern society. They supported legislation for land reform, divorce, education, and similar measures that could modernize society. These unexpected and dramatic developments not only developed socialism in Italy but also stimulated the political efficiency of Italian democratic process. However, the speed of socialist development largely depended on the level of local development. In the big cities of northern and central Italy or in economically developed agricultural areas, socialism was more widely spread than in southern Italy or underdeveloped areas. Lack of education and poverty created inevitable barriers for lower-class people to participate in the movement.

Although some views of socialism and democracy that developed in the Biennio Rosso were ahead of that time, the approach to democracy and the transition from capitalism to socialism are increasingly more meaningful in contemporary debates on socialist strategy. By meeting and exchanging views, socialists could adopt innovative strategies towards greater social justice to help deprived and underprivileged members of the community. Italian socialism consistently makes connections with the whole nature of humankind and give tens of thousands of Italians a sense of participation in the political process.
