= XVIII Congress of the Italian Socialist Party =

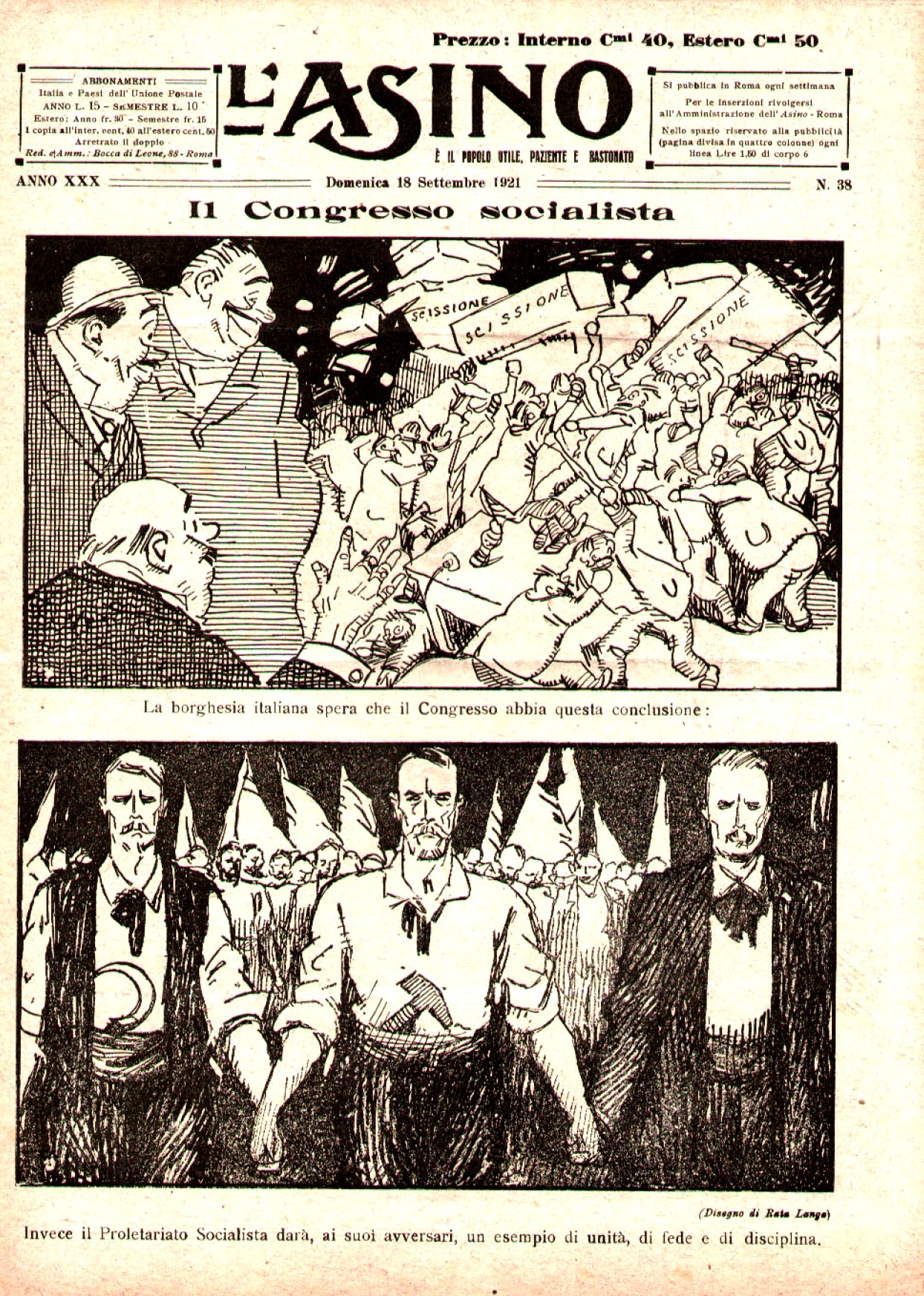
Cover of l'Asino, 18 September 1921. Top panel: "The Italian bourgeoisie hopes that the Congress will end like this"; bottom panel "Instead, the Socialist Proletariat will give its adversaries an example of unity, faith, and discipline."

The XVIII Congress of the Italian Socialist Party was held at the Teatro Lirico in Milan from 10 to 14 October 1921, a few months after the dramatic XVII Congress in Livorno that had marked the split between socialists and communists and the birth of the Communist Party of Italy.

== Background ==
The 3rd World Congress of the Communist International held in Moscow in the summer of 1921, had approved this split and rejected the Italian Socialist Party's (PSI) request to join the Comintern because if its refusal to expel its reformist elements, led by Filippo Turati. The Italian socialist delegates present at that congress, Costantino Lazzari, it:Fabrizio Maffi and Ezio Riboldi, returned to Italy with the aim of following the Comintern's requirements and bringing their party into international positions. Meanwhile, in Italy, the months preceding the Milan Congress were marked by the spread of squadrismo, which led the PSI and the General Confederation of Labour (CGL) to sign a “Pact of Pacification” with the fascists in August. However just over a month later the squadristi broke the agreement with the murder of it:Giuseppe Di Vagno.

== Key questions ==
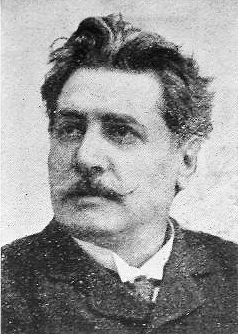
Giovanni Bacci

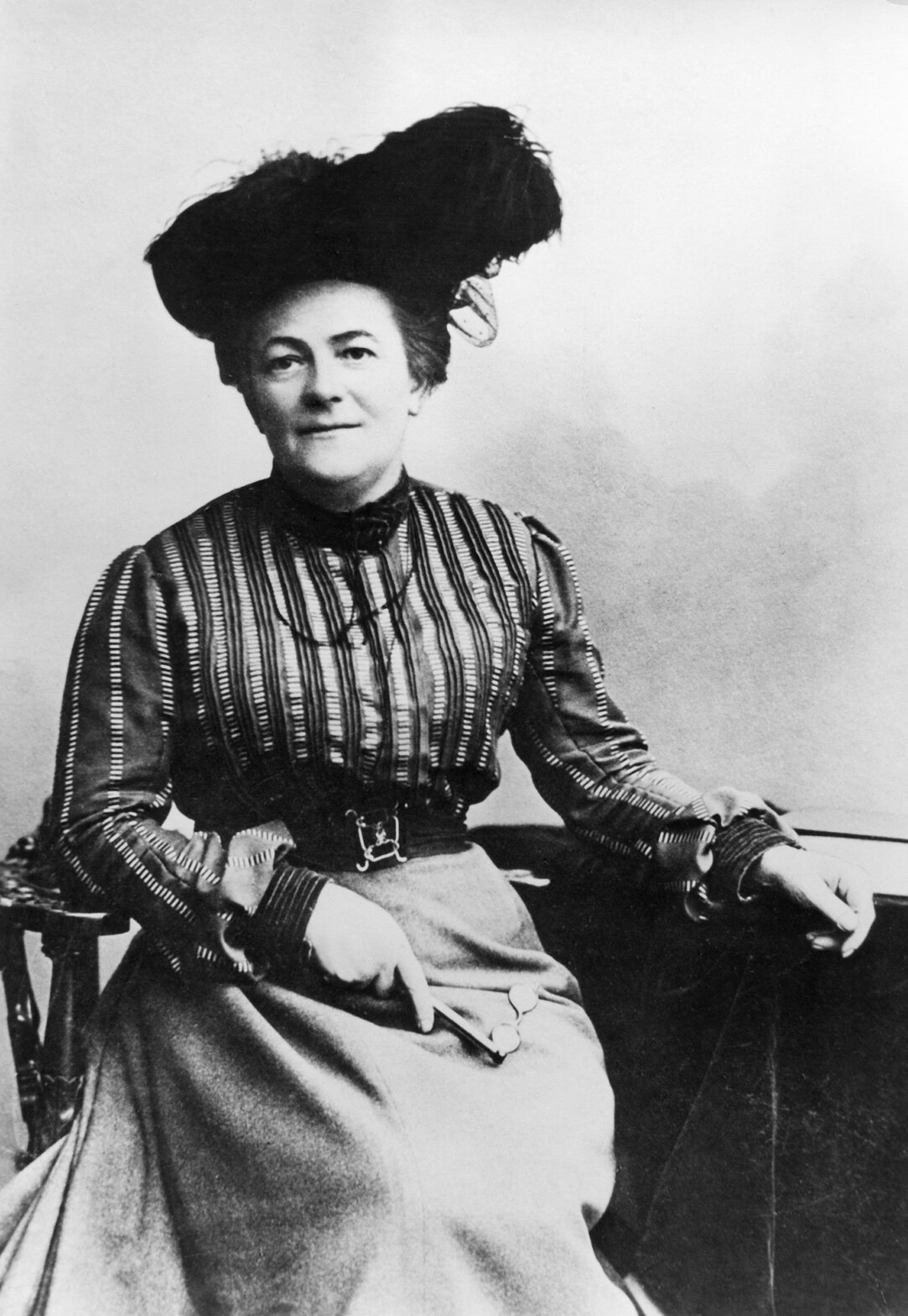
Clara Zetkin

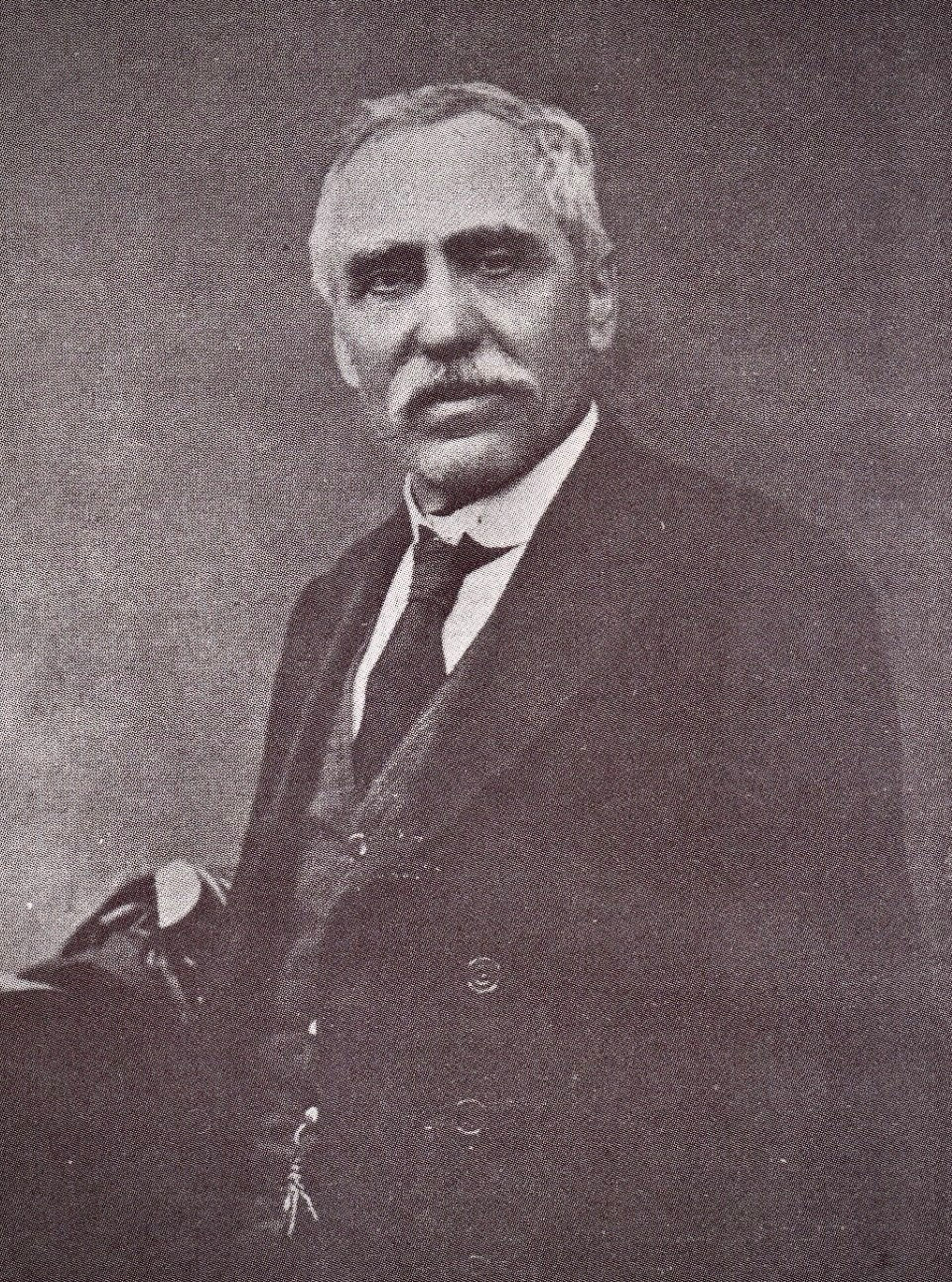
Costantino Lazzari

The introductory report by the president of the congress, Giovanni Bacci, described the impotence of the workers' movement in confronting fascist violence, defended the agreement with the squadristi and asserted the need for the party to remain united in the face of the serious threats it faced. The debate then focused whether the party should collaborate with bourgeois parties in forming a government.

This debate focused on the discussion of four motions. The maximalist proposals, supported by Giacinto Menotti Serrati and it:Adelchi Baratono, both rejected the expulsion of the reformists and rejected any idea of collaboration with the bourgeois governments. The motion put forward by the right of the party, signed by Turati, raised the possibility of having Socialist parliamentarians collaborate in the formation of governments that would protect the civil and political liberties of the working classes. The delegates returning from Moscow, Lazzari, Maffi and Riboldi presented their own motion, that was described as maximalist secessionist or third internationalist, since it supported the expulsion of the reformists. A fourth compromise document was also presented, by the centrist it:Cesare Alessandri.

== Proceedings ==
The collaborationist approach which was strongly criticised by the foreign delegates (French, Belgian, Komsomol) and by the representative of the Communist International, Clara Zetkin, whose speech in German was translated by it:Gustavo Sacerdote. Zetkin underlined how collaborationism had always been ruinous for the proletariat, and how it was necessary to choose between Marx and Kautsky, between Lenin and Briand, and therefore to expel the reformists before they could set the party on a disastrous course.

Claudio Treves countered, defending the collaborationist proposal in light of the practical need to confront fascism, "which is not - as we were comfortable thinking - a flash in the pan", and to support party members elected to serve the working class in municipalities, cooperatives and leagues. Treves also branded the International as an "extension of Russia" which did not properly represent the Western proletariat. Ferdinando Cazzamalli supported the unitary motion, considering it appropriate to "correct, rather than bring havoc to our party", therefore avoiding large scale splits but working through "successive gradual purges", defending the party from the twin threats of split and reformism.

The representative of the Communist Party of Poland, Henryk Walecki, also representing the Comintern, was very harsh with the PSI and with all the factions opposed to the expulsion of the right wing. In a speech interrupted by various protests, Walecki reiterated the responsibility of the reformists, including the CGL, for the failure of the revolution in Italy during the Biennio Rosso. Addressing the maximalists, he stressed how the gradualists had increased in number after the split at the Livorno Congress, saying “if yesterday they wanted to collaborate with you, today they want to collaborate with the bourgeoisie”, and urged their expulsion, comparing it to the amputation of a gangrenous limb.

The subsequent speech by the concentrationist Giacomo Matteotti put the theme of fascism at the centre, which had been neglected in the previous congress. Matteotti highlighted the urgency of tackling the fight against fascism with unity of purpose rather than concentrating on doctrinal disputes.

Serrati then spoke, arguing that the victory of the proletariat could not come from division: taking issue with the so-called "Moscow pilgrims", Lazzari, Maffi and Riboldi. Later Serrati would take the floor again to underline his opposition to collaboration with the bourgeois parties and to calling the reformists to adhere to party discipline, reiterating the maximalist position of support for revolutionary violence and the dictatorship of the proletariat. Before this last intervention by Serrati there had been significant disturbances caused by Austrian social democrat Friedrich Adler, representing the International Working Union of Socialist Parties, whose presence at the Congress was angrily rejected by those who supported the Comintern line.

On the last day of the congress, the reformist it:Giuseppe Emanuele Modigliani criticized Serrati and the maximalist position, as did Turati, stating that pushing the reformists out and dividing the party again would be a “crime against the proletariat”, the “destruction of that edifice which I have built in 40 years of struggle.” For it:Adelchi Baratono, the maximalist motion, which proposed to resort to expulsions only in cases of clear acts of indiscipline, was “the best resolution of our internal problems”. The last speaker was Lazzari, who advocated joining the Comintern by accepting its conditions.

== Outcome ==
The final vote saw the unitary maximalist motion prevail, obtaining over 47,000 votes, against the almost 20,000 of the concentration motion. Only 3,700 votes were obtained by the secessionist maximalist motion, while another 8,000 votes went to the centrist document. The victorious motion, although reaffirming the PSI's desire to be part of the Communist International, was not sufficient to resolve relations with Moscow, which judged the results of the congress as proof of the fact that the Italian Socialist Party had by now become a slave to opportunism.
