= XVII Congress of the Italian Socialist Party =

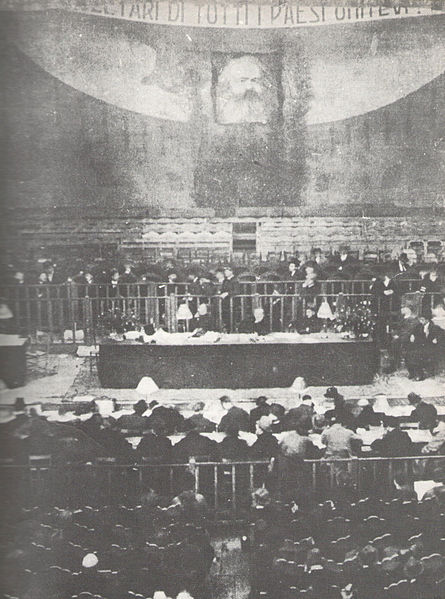
The Goldoni Theater in Livorno during the XVII Congress of the Italian Socialist Party

The XVII Congress of the Italian Socialist Party (PSI) was held at the Carlo Goldoni Theatre in Livorno from 15 to 21 January 1921. After tumultuous proceedings the congress resulted in a split in the party. The communist faction, faced with the refusal of the majority to accept the Comintern line and expel reformists and gradualists, abandoned the PSI and established a new Italian Communist Party.

== Background ==
=== Communist International ===
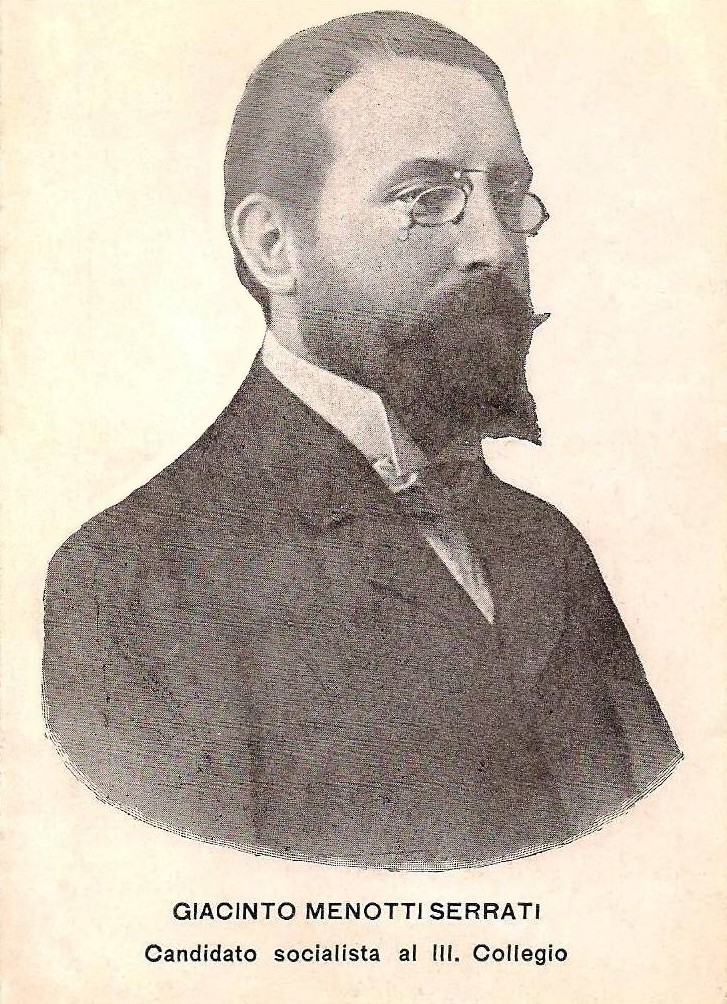
Giacinto Menotti Serrati

The PSI had joined the Communist International at its XVI Congress in Bologna in October 1919. This marked a leftward shift for the Italian party, emphasising armed revolution and the dictatorship of the proletariat. However in July-August 1920, the 2nd World Congress of the Communist International then went on to adopt 21 new conditions for all of its member parties. One of these was the requirement that parties remove all reformists, who were considered counter-revolutionaries. The Italian Socialist Party faced the additional criticism that thanks to what the International defined as the "sabotage" by the General Confederation of Labour, the party had not been able to seize the revolutionary opportunity during the Biennio Rosso. The PSI had left the initiative to the union, which had followed gradualist tactics leading to the agreement of 15 September 1920 with the industrialists. Mediated by Prime Minister Giovanni Giolitti, this had guaranteed wage increases but not led to significant political advances.

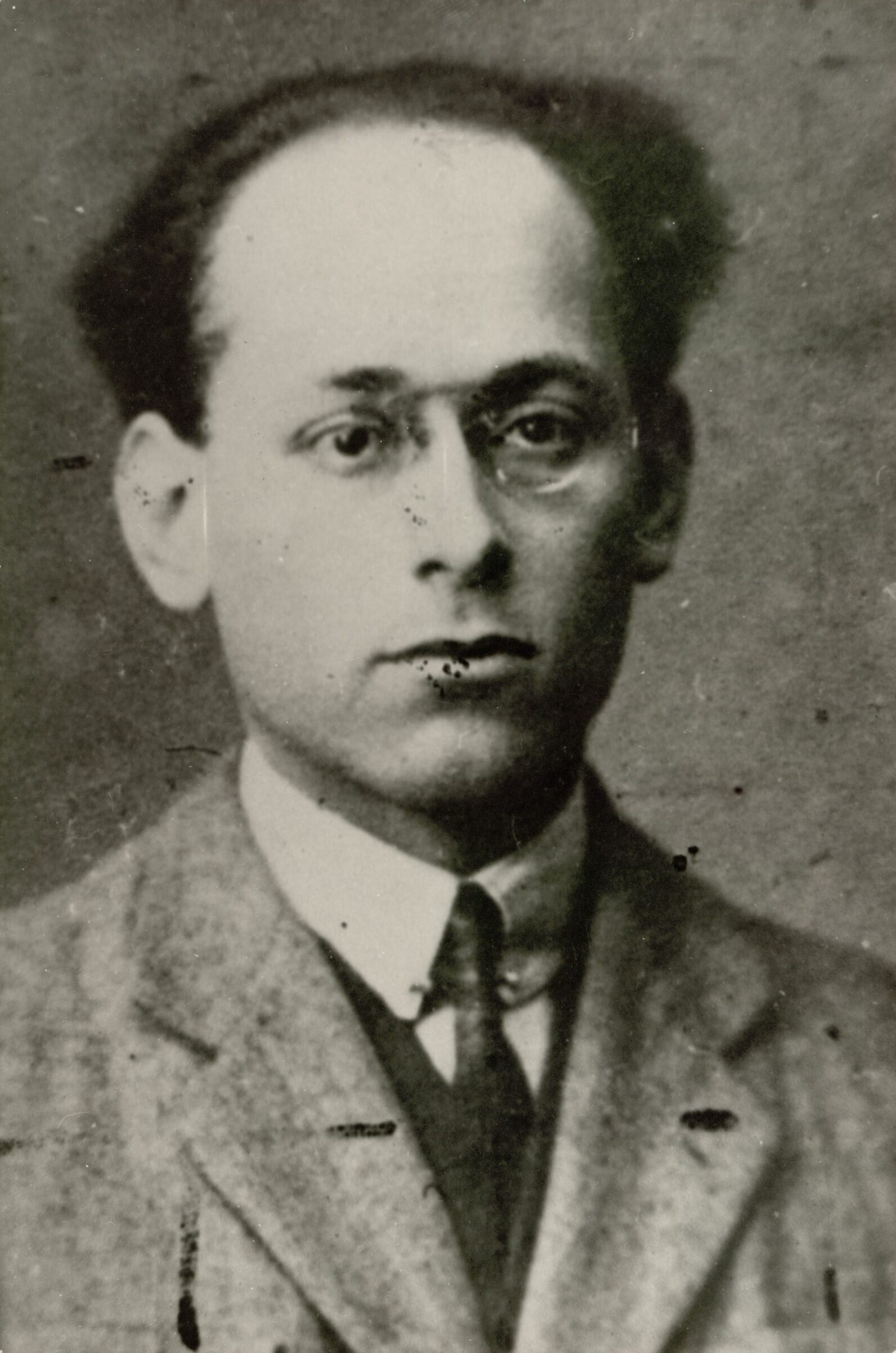
Umberto Terracini

However the leadership of the PSI were not keen to adopt the International’s 21 points. Giacinto Menotti Serrati, leader of the majority maximalist grouping in the PSI, feared that the expulsion of figures such as Filippo Turati, Claudio Treves and Ludovico D'Aragona would alienate a large number of workers. Serrati also considered the removal of the right wing of the party unjust, because it had neither participated in bourgeois governments nor supported intervention in the First World War, unlike the French socialists and German Social Democrats.

At the end of three days of heated discussions, the majority in the Directorate agreed to adopt an agenda put forward by Umberto Terracini which implemented the 21 points in full. The agenda was voted for by Terracini himself as well as Egidio Gennari, Ivan Regent, Giuseppe Tuntar, Casimiro Casucci, Tito Marziali and Ambrogio Belloni. A minority of five - Serrati, Adelchi Baratono, Emilio Zannerini, Giovanni Bacci and Gino Giacomini supported an alternative agenda that insisted on party unity and claimed autonomy in the application of international directives. In the light of this result, Serrati resigned as director of Avanti!, official organ of the PSI, but the communist majority decided to keep him temporarily in place.

=== The factions prepare for the Congress ===
On the eve of the Congress the party was divided into three main factions and two minor groups: the right wing followed Turati's position of reformist gradualism; in the center were placed most of the maximalists (the "unitary communists") of Serrati; on the left, the "pure" communists of Amadeo Bordiga. In an intermediate position between reformists and unitaries were the so-called "intransigent revolutionaries" of Costantino Lazzari, while alongside the communists was the group around Antonio Graziadei and Anselmo Marabini which, while faithful to the Comintern, wanted to work for a mediation.

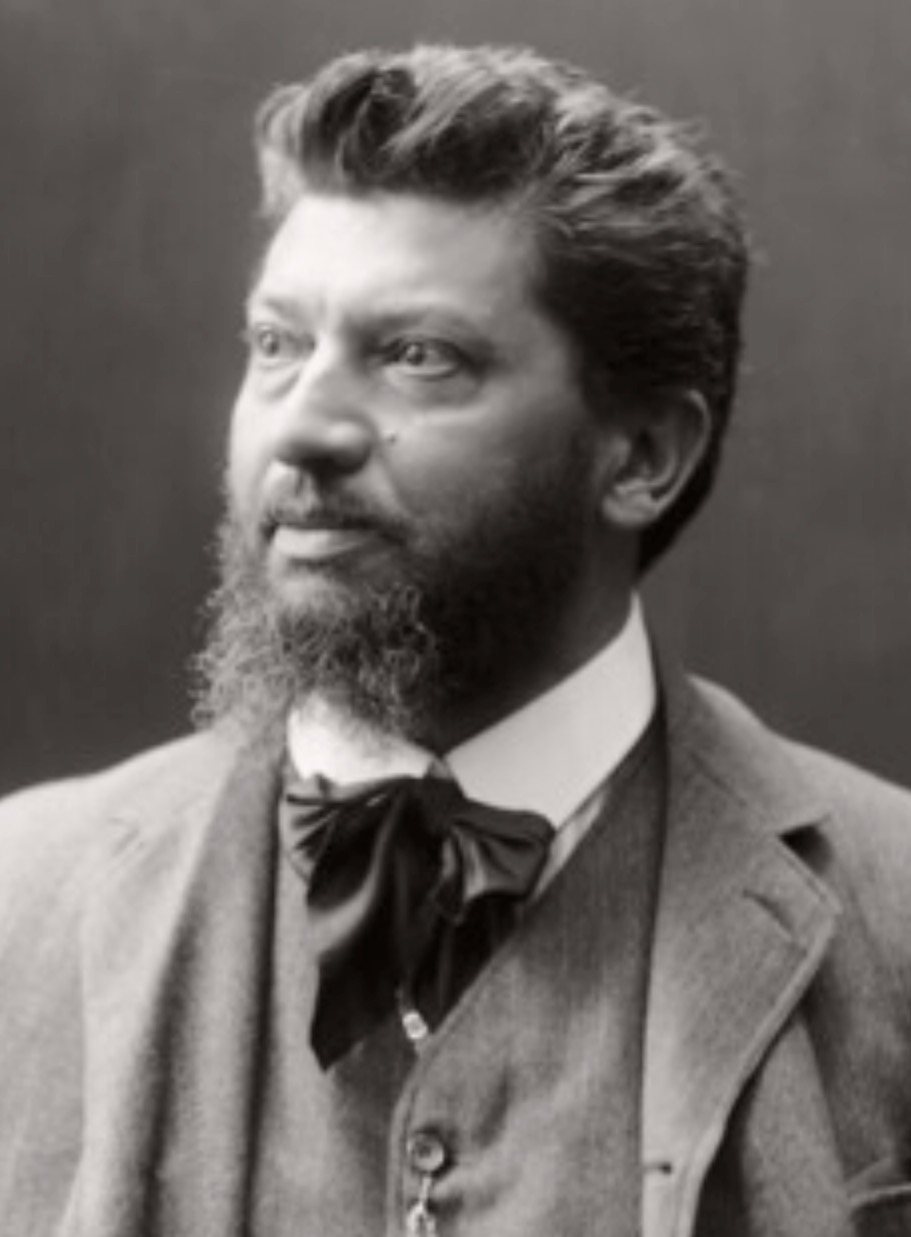
Filippo Turati

Turati’s group did not command a majority, but they had control of the parliamentary group and the General Confederation of Labour. They supported a motion, put forward by Ludovico D'Aragona and Gino Baldesi, recognising the good work done up to then by the Italian Socialist Party; supporting the need for party unity, guaranteeing by the protection of freedom of expression with corresponding discipline in following majority decisions; confirming membership of the Comintern, but asking for interpretative autonomy in the application of the 21 points. It also called into question the fundamentals of the motion adopted by the Bologna Congress - it rejected violent seizure of power and assorted that the dictatorship of the proletariat should be understood as "a transitory necessity imposed by special situations and not as a programmatic obligation", inevitably be modeled on what happened in Russia; finally, it supported "all possible attempts to bring socialist government closer", while judging the idea of short-term revolutionary upheavals in the richest European countries to be childish.

The unitary maximalist motion was proposed by Serrati, Baratono, Bacci, Momigliano, Frola, Vella and Alessandri. It underlined the need to "preserve the unity of the Party in order to better and more quickly achieve the conquest of all political power", to be pursued by any means compatible with "absolute class intransigence", including both legal and extra-legal means. It too reaffirmed membership of the International, but also sought the possibility of applying the 21 points according to the conditions of the individual countries and to temporarily keep the name "socialist" rather than immediately adopting the “communist” name.

The left wing had consolidated itself into a grouping that could already be considered a party within a party. The communist fraction had formed in Milan on 15 October, publishing a manifesto signed by Bordiga, Gramsci, Misiano and Terracini, by the leftist maximalists Bombacci, Repossi and Fortichiari and by the secretary of the Socialist Youth Federation Luigi Polano.

The two main communist elements were the Turin group linked to the magazine L'Ordine Nuovo and the Naples group linked to Il Soviet, led by Bordiga. These groups met in Imola on November 28 and 29 1920 and agreed a motion for the Livorno conference that confirmed the PSI’s adhesion to the Third International and fully implemented its directives, starting with the decision «to change the name of the Party to that of Communist Party of Italy (Section of the III Communist International)» and to expel all members who would have voted against the complete observance of the 21 conditions for admission to the Comintern and the Communist program of the Party in the Congress. This program was an integral part of the document presented by the fraction and was developed in ten points, which highlighted, among other things, the role of the class political party as an indispensable organ of the revolutionary struggle; the struggle for the violent overthrow of bourgeois power and the establishment of the dictatorship of the proletariat.

=== Provincial congresses and the position of Serrati ===
The positions of the different factions were discussed and voted on at various provincial party congresses leading up to the national congress in Livorno. The unitary maximalist faction, despite being a minority in the Directorate, obtained a large majority during the progress of the provincial congresses: Serrati's motion obtained about 100,000 votes, against 58,000 for the communist motion and 15,000 for the concentrationist (Turati) one. Despite their commanding support, the Serrati group continued to reject any idea of expulsions of the moderate wing.

This situation raised tension in relations between the PSI and the International; a fruitless exchange of letters took place in November and December 1920 between Serrati and Comintern chief Zinoviev; a meeting in Reval was proposed to clarify the position Serrati’s group, but the Italian delegation declined to undertake such a long trip on the eve of the congress. Zinoviev, in a subsequent letter dated December 20, reaffirmed the Comintern's support for pure communists and accused Serrati of slipping to the right.

Lenin, who had admired the PSI, repeatedly criticized the maximalist leader. Nevertheless Serrati, feeling that "evolved" Italy was with him and that consensus around his position was growing, summarized the reasons for his dissent from the Comintern line in the Avanti! of 16 December, in a long article in which he defended himself against the accusation of opportunism and claimed the need to preserve unity in order to preserve "the Party, the Proletariat and the Revolution from an insane mania for destruction and demolition".

Later Swiss Comintern secretsry Jules Humbert-Droz claimed that given his high-profile role in the world socialist movement, also sanctioned by having presided over the II Congress of the Comintern, his “defense of the Italian reformists could not in fact be read only as a matter of local tactics”, but “became the defense of international reformism against the Comintern itself” that “Serrati had involuntarily become an international counter-revolutionary force”.

== Congressional Debates ==
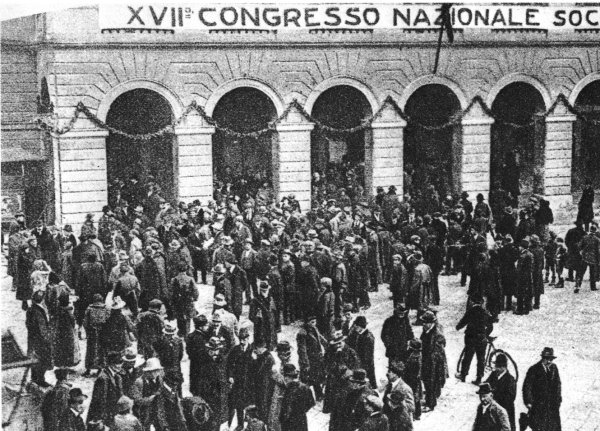
XVII Congress of the Italian Socialist Party

=== 15 January ===
On the eve of the congress, the leadership’s report on the period since the Bologna Congress was distributed. It highlighted the substantial growth achieved: the PSI, which in 1919 had 1,891 sections with 81,464 members, now had 4,367 sections and 216,327 members. This increase was also seen in terms of deputies elected to parliamentary (from 47 to 156) and local government (350 municipalities and 8 provinces at the time of the XVI Congress, 2,500 municipalities and 25 provinces in January 1921).

After the final meetings of the fractions were held on the morning of January 15, the congress was opened at 14:00 by the provisional president Giovanni Bacci, who recalled the anniversary of the Spartacist insurrection of 1919. Francesco Frola then read the greeting of the Executive Committee of the Communist International which harshly attacked the unitary faction, whose action was defined in the document as «the realization of the most unfavorable forecasts», and the messages from the left wing of the Swiss Socialist Party and of the Austrian, Dutch and Spanish Communist Parties. The latter's message was a direct indictment against Serrati and provoked disputes and controversies. Paul Levi was present for the Communist Workers' Party of Germany, who in his greeting speech hoped for the establishment of the Communist Party in Italy as well.

The debate on the party's direction then opened; the first speaker was Antonio Graziadei, whose fraction, the "circular", was seeking unity between communists and maximalists: they believed it was still possible to bring the majority into agreement with the positions of the Comintern, and proposed the compromise name “Italian Communist Socialist Party”.

=== 16 January ===
On the morning of 16 January, the representative of the Bulgarian Communist Party and of the International, Khristo Kabakchiev presented his report: the text, written in French and read in translation by Francesco Misiano, first dealt with the political situation in the Balkans and then went on to discuss Italy, developing in detail the theme of the poor economic and financial situation of the country in the aftermath of the First World War and indicating “the revolutionary way as the only way out of the crisis”. This goal was to be pursued by ousting all those who hindered it (i.e. ‘the reformists’): according to the Kabakchiev, this “split between revolutionary and non-revolutionary forces”, which had already occurred in many countries, was “also necessary in Italy so that the whole European continent was ready for the final upheaval which would have led to peace and the solution of the problems of unemployment and misery caused by bourgeois policies”.

Kabakchiev's text was particularly hard on Serrati, accusing him of reformism and opportunism; this led to uproar, and Serrati himself was forced to take the stage to restore calm. In the continuation of the speech of the Bulgarian delegate it was reiterated that "the CGdL and the PSI have not fulfilled their duty", lnot having directed the struggle of the Italian proletariat towards the main aim, the conquest of political power”, and the finger against the membership of the Confederation of Labor in the International Union of Amsterdam, defined as "one of the most important supports of the international bourgeoisie" and against Serrati's endorsement of this state of affairs. The last part of the speech focused on the analysis of the risks that a revolution would have attracted to Italy in terms of economic blockades and war actions by capitalist countries, “which would have brought to the proletariat similar sufferings to those endured by the Russian proletariat”, and however it was necessary to face "to break the chains of capitalist slavery and to emancipate oneself from it definitively".

In the afternoon session, chaired by Argentina Altobelli, Adelchi Baratono spoke for the maximalists, who pleaded the cause of party unity, defined the distinctions between the pure and unitary fractions as artificial and insubstantial and underlined how the revolution had been stopped both by the action of the reformists and "the not fully revolutionary orientation of the masses". Baratono then claimed the fidelity of his fraction to the International, emphasizing however that «we must not slavishly copy the Russian figure on the method of revolutionary adaptation». The speaker reiterated the request to Moscow to let the Italian party evaluate questions of a national nature, and to be able to operate with the collaboration of the Bolsheviks, rather than just receiving orders. Baratono, rejecting the charge that the right wing of the party were collaborators ("our right-wingers in Italy correspond to the left-wingers of other nations"), however did not exclude the possibility of starting a periodic review of the sections and a continuous process of purge, without destroying “that marvelous complex organism which is today the Italian Socialist Party”.

=== 17 January ===
The third day was dominated by the speeches of Costantino Lazzari and Umberto Terracini. Lazzari, from the minority fraction of the "intransigent revolutionaries", criticized the splitters and, referring to Marx, underlined how indispensable the unity of the proletariat was, and how the distinction between communism and socialism was forced. The distinction had become necessary terminologically in Russia, where "even the reformists are called revolutionaries", but was misleading in Italy: "it would make one believe that Communism is something different from Socialism". Lazzari also asserted that the Russians did not take into account the fact that in Italy, unlike many other countries, the social democratic currents had already been expelled for a long time, and he recalled in this regard the purge of Leonida Bissolati, Ivanoe Bonomi, Angiolo Cabrini and Guido Podrecca in 1912 for supporting the Italian invasion of Libya. Lazzari therefore said he was against the expulsion of the right wing of the party, according to the principle of “freedom in thought and discipline in action”.

Terracini, who claimed that the communist current was the only one that had not waived the decisions of the Congress of Bologna, spoke of the need to modify a party born decades earlier with objectives different from the current ones.” Having analyzed the historical trend of the Italian workers' movement towards the seizure of power, he underlined the need to establish the means - such as a revolutionary party - that could achieve it”. He urged the party to “comply with the 21 points of the International” by expelling the reformists, separating itself from those who believed that one could "reach power through the parliamentary regime" and who lacked recognition of the “universal validity of the Bolshevik revolution”. Terracini said that “this revolution had to be accepted in full”, and defended the concepts of dictatorship of the proletariat and socialization.

=== 18 January ===
On the morning of 18 January it was the concentrationist Gino Baldesi's turn to speak. He claimed the union battle of 1920 had been a victory and underlined how it was inevitable that the union organizers were "all a bit on the right", not because of a "social democratic mentality" but due to the need to deal daily with the individual problems and disputes of the proletariat within a bourgeois society. Baldesi challenged the possibility of achieving the dictatorship of the proletariat in an advanced country such as Italy, defining this hypothesis as unfeasible. Instead he put forward the idea that power could be achieved through elections, if support for socialism in southern Italy reached the levels achieved in the centre and north of the country. After arguing that it would have been better to devote the congress to discussing the merits of the 21 points rather than the expulsion of the reformists, he proclaimed that the members of his fraction would accept the discipline of the majority in the name of unity of the party.

In the afternoon, the congress took a stand against the detention and possible extradition of Hungarian socialists who, fleeing the regime of Miklós Horthy, had taken refuge in Italy and had been arrested there. Immediately afterwards Vincenzo Vacirca spoke, claiming that one of the causes of reaction was in the preaching of revolutionary violence, which could not overcome bourgeois violence. The Sicilian orator also lingered on the problems of the South, emphasizing that to transform the party into a truly national structure it would be necessary to develop a political-union organization hitherto lacking in that region, capable of breaking up the large estates and improving production methods and working conditions. Even Vacirca, who had a very heated argument with Nicola Bombacci during his speech (the latter even drew a revolver), reaffirmed his acceptance of the 21 points, but with the reservation that the congress should be able to discuss them and propose modifications.

=== 19 January ===
On 19 January the session was opened with the commemoration of Andrea Costa on the anniversary of his death. Amadeo Bordiga then took the stage and denounced the entire history of pre-war socialism, accusing it of having become in recent decades a conservative force that had replaced the Marxist conception of violent conflict between classes with a peaceful petit-bourgeois vision. For Bordiga the interest of the proletarian class could not be realized within the present political framework, through the pursuit of gradual conquests and partial results which did not set the objective of overthrowing the bourgeois state. Bordiga made explicit the hard choice between «bourgeois dictatorship or proletarian dictatorship», claiming that social democracy, where it had come to power as in Ukraine or Georgia, had “betrayed its own theories of freedom” and “had acted against the proletariat”.

Bordiga then reiterated the need to accept the 21 points and, in response to the position of those who considered them inapplicable outside Russia, underlined his view they had “universal value” and were, if anything, “less useful precisely where power had already been conquered”. The speaker concluded by praising the “no-holds-barred struggle against the opponents of the Revolution and the establishment of a Soviet republic”.

During the morning Serrati also spoke, centering his speech on a series of recriminations against the behavior of the International towards the PSI, pointing the finger at the unequal treatment reserved for Italian socialists compared to what happened in the congress of French SFIO, where "rightists", "patriotards" and "Freemasons" had been tolerated without ultimatums. His evaluation focused, among other things, on the attitude of the delegates of the International, in particular Kabakchiev but also Mátyás Rákosi, who had replaced Zinoviev and Bukharin at the last moment (the Italian authorities had denied them entry visas) and who appeared more intransigent than Zinoviev himself at the congress of the Independent Social Democratic Party of Germany or Clara Zetkin at that of the SFIO. In the final part of his speech, Serrati dwelt on the unity of the Italian Socialist Party as the only hope "for the Russia of the Soviets", in the light of the “suffocation of the communist movements , Estonia, Poland, Yugoslavia, Czechoslovakia, Bulgaria and Romania”, of the dissolution of the Confédération générale du travail in France, of the “control of the English working mass by conservative laborism”.

Filippo Turati's afternoon speech demonstrated the profound ideological difference that separated him from the communists: in fact, it revealed the clear rejection of any violent revolutionary solution and a strenuous defense of socialist reformism and its "daily work of creating maturity of things and men", that would survive the "Russian myth" behind which, in his view, nationalism was hidden. Turati declared himself in favor of the motion by Baldesi and D’Aragona, attacked the principle of recourse to violence, and underlined how the proletarian dictatorship had to be of the majority, i.e. democratic, in order not to turn into mere oppression. His speech was particularly applauded by the maximalists.

The feeling of consensus achieved by Turati made his companion Anna Kuliscioff comment how he went “from being accused and almost condemned” had become “the conqueror of the congress”. A similar assessment came from the former socialist Benito Mussolini, who from the columns of the Popolo d'Italia claimed this transformation was due to fascism: having "ravaged and hastily dispersed the men of violence in the provinces where they had organized the red terror", the fascists had allowed the return of "traditional socialism".

Nicola Bombacci spoke of a “painful but necessary separation”, in the light of the revolutionary period the country was going through and the need for clarity within the socialist movement and its “two schools”. Anselmo Marabini then intervened, from the "circular" fraction, explaining that his own group would vote for "the motion that will be recognized by the representatives of the third international", accusing the unitaries of dividing the party in the name of unity.

It was evident that any hope of avoiding the rupture had by now waned, as Graziadei and Paul Levi had become aware. Up until the day before they had tried to mediate with Serrati to obtain the expulsion of the reformists and the unity of the rest of the party, however they were stopped by the delegates of the Comintern: Rákosi would later report that he had telegraphed to Moscow to request new directives on the matter, obtaining in response the authorization to continue along the path of forcing the split.

=== 20 January ===
Then came the sixth day of the congress, during which the voting was scheduled. First, however, there was room for other interventions, such as that of Jules Humbert-Droz who, as Rosa Bloch had previously done, spoke of the imminent split of the communists from the Swiss Socialist Party and hoped that the Italian Socialist Party, who had been an example during and after the war, did not turn its back on the Third International; and that of Costantino Lazzari, who declared that he was withdrawing his motion to adhere to the unitary one. Then Kabakchiev spoke and was peremptory in affirming that the factions that did not vote for the expulsion of the reformists would in turn be expelled from the International. After half an hour of controversy and incidents, Misiano read a joint statement by Kabakchiev and Rákosi, according to which the only acceptable motion was the communist one.

==== The exit of the Communists ====
Following the withdrawal of the motions from the circular and intransigent fractions, voting proceeded on three motions: the unitary or "Florence" one (signed by Baratono and Serrati), the communist or "Imola" one (Bordiga-Terracini) and the concentrationist or "Reggio Emilia" one (Baldesi-D'Aragona).

President Bacci gave an account of the results on the morning of 21 January: out of 172 487 valid votes, 98,028 went to the Unitarians, 58,783 to the Communists and 14,695 to the concentrationists, with 981 abstentions. The announcement of the vote was followed by an intervention from Polano (the Youth Federation "resolves to follow the decisions that the communist fraction will take") and by Bordiga's announcement that the majority of the congress had placed itself outside the Third International, and therefore the delegates supporting the communist motion would leave the hall. Soon after the communists walked out of the Teatro Goldoni singing The Internationale and gathered at the it:Teatro San Marco. There, they held the I Congress of the Communist Party of Italy and ratified the birth of the new party, into which a few days later, as announced, the youth organization also merged.

==== Other business ====
The remaining majority delegates in the PSI congress continued their work. A motion signed by Paolo Bentivoglio was unanimously approved in which the PSI's adhesion to the Communist International was reiterated «accepting its principles and method without reserve», and protesting against the declaration of exclusion issued by the representative of the Executive Committee. The hope was that at the next congress of the Comintern the dispute could be resolved by blaming Kabakchiev for having gone beyond the limits of his mandate.

A speech by Adelchi Baratono followed, highlighting the differences between the unitary motion and the concentrationist one, and urging the right wing to accept the revolutionary program of the party and the principles of the International. Turati then intervened, urging a common effort for "the Party to become the class and become the great union of the national and international proletariat"... His words did not reassure everyone, and there were those who judged them "elastic" and "such as not to be relied upon", to which Serrati replied that he would be vigilant "on our comrades of the right wing" and that, if they behaved in a way harmful for the party «one cannot have mercy on them».

In the course of the morning the new committee of the PSI was also elected, which turned out to be composed exclusively of unitaries. Two parliamentary deputies were on the list of candidates drawn up by the majority fraction: Gaetano Pilati, as representative of the proletarian League of the maimed and war veterans, and Giovanni Bacci, as chairman of Avanti! who resided in Rome, where he could easily work in the headquarters. The proposal was opposed by Giuseppe Romita, who maintained that being a member of the Directorate was incompatible with being a holder of public office, but nevertheless the assembly approved the list by a large majority. In addition to Pilati and Bacci, the new committee comprised Serrati (who was also confirmed as chairman of Avanti!), Baratono, Sebastiano Bonfiglio, Franco Clerici, Domenico Fioritto, Giuseppe Mantica, Giuseppe Parpagnoli, Giuseppe Passigli, Alojz Štolfa, Emilio Zannerini, Raffaele Montanari and Eugenio Mortara.

The work of the congress closed at 13:00, after President Bacci had exhorted his comrades to resume work immediately "in the Sections, in the Party, in the country, in the International" and after the delegates who had praised the Russian Revolution and sung The Internationale and the Bandiera Rossa.

== Reactions and consequences ==
=== In Italy ===
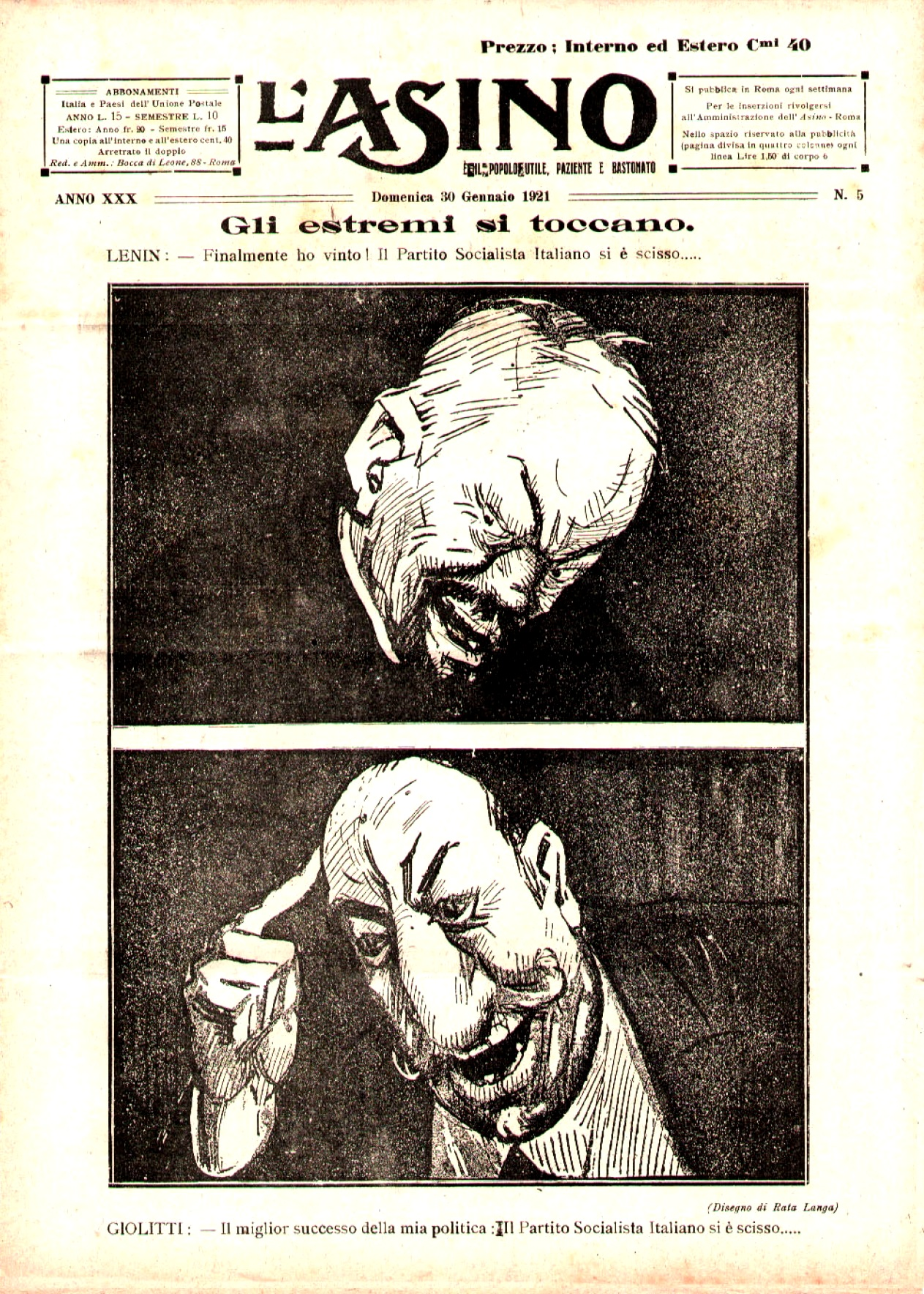
cover of L'Asino, 30 January 1921. The upper part of the cartoon reads: “LENIN: I have finally won! The Italian Socialist Party split...”; the lower part: “GIOLITTI”: The greatest success of my policy! The Italian Socialist Party split..."

The outcome of the congress was greeted favorably by the bourgeois press, which underlined how the exit of the Communists must be a cause for satisfaction: La Stampa of 22 January 1921 spoke of the «victory of what is logical, natural and normal" and underlined how "the fever" had been driven out of the PSI, preventing the "extreme current" and "anarchoid revolutionism" from being able to poison "the life of the nation".

The favourable view expressed in the mainstream press was not matched by any reduction in the physical attacks that Italian socialists were subjected to, by squadristi and others. In Livorno the fascist presence was such that Francesco Misiano, threatened with death, had to go and return from congress meetings with a bodyguard. In the aftermath of the split, the spread of right-wing subversion forced the organised working class to defend itself against attacks on the Labour chambers, cooperatives, peasant women’s leagues, workers' newspapers, and individual activists.

The May 1921 Italian general election saw the fascists elected to parliament for the first time as part of the National Block. In August 1922, an anti-fascist general strike was organized throughout the country by the socialists. Mussolini declared that the Fascists would suppress the strike themselves if the government did not immediately intervene to stop it, which enabled him to position the Fascist Party as a defender of law and order. On August 2, at Ancona, Fascist squads moved in from the countryside and razed all buildings occupied by socialists. This was then repeated in Genoa and other cities. On 29 October, the King handed power to Mussolini, who was supported by the military, the business class, and the right wing.

=== In the Italian socialist movement ===
Within the reduced PSI, the question of whether reformists should be expelled continued even after the Communists left to form their own party. The PSI’s XVIII Congress was held in Milan in October 1921, and here again a left-wing faction urged the expulsion of the right. Serrati’s line of adherence to the Comintern line while refusing to expel those who rejected it continued to prevail. The XVIII Congress also rejected a right-wing motion from Turati that would have allowed socialist parliamentarians to collaborate in a government with bourgeois parties. The expulsion of the reformists was finally resolved at the following PSI Congress, the XIX Congress in Rome in October 1922. After Turati had participated in crisis consultations with the Facta Government, the maximalists, led by Serrati and Maffi, decreed the purge of the gradualists, who then broke away under Turati and Matteotti to found the Unitary Socialist Party.

Socialist Pietro Nenni, in 1926, wrote that in Livorno ‘the tragedy of the Italian proletariat began’. Serrati himself, three years later, said that not adhering to the motion of the Communists was the biggest mistake of his life. In 1924 he led the left wing of the PSI into the Communist Party and was elected to its central committee. In 1923 Antonio Gramsci reflected that during the period leading up to the Livorno Congress, the communist fraction, had failed to lead the majority of the proletariat towards the positions of the International, and that this had paved the way for the advent of fascism.

In 1961 Palmiro Togliatti reflected on whether the creation of the new working class party, "at the very beginning of 1921, was not the cause of a harmful weakening of the workers' and democratic movement, which should have been avoided", especially in the defence against fascism. He noted that "still today, in current controversies, and above all when we communists appeal to the unity of democratic and class forces, this circumstance is held against us". However, he replied to this argument by recalling that «still maintaining an external unity would have served no purpose. If the national leaders had tried to do it, a process would have started from below, not one of renewal, but of disorganization and decay, which would have been impossible to arrest».

=== Relations with Comintern ===
The Comintern expelled the PSI, calling on it to expel its own right wing and then unify with the new Italian Communist Party. However the unleashing of violent reaction in Italy, together with the failure of the revolutionary attempt in Germany known as the "March Action", internal political difficulties in the USSR and the halting of the advance of the Red Army in the Polish–Soviet War during the spring of 1921 were among the factors that led to the adoption of a less radical line by the Comintern in the months following the Livorno Congress. Seeing that revolutionary communist parties were nowhere achieving the gains expected, in 1922 the Comintern called for the adoption of united fronts between those parties and workers in other political parties to defend the interests of the working class against attack.

Disagreeing with this new line, Umberto Terracini contested the need to wait until the majority if the working class had been won over before starting the struggle for power, and was harshly reproached for this view by Lenin. Thus began a phase of profound dissent between the Comintern and the Communist Party of Italy (CPI), which achieved "an international reputation for extremism which undermined its policy right from the start". Although the CPI was disciplined in its acceptance of Comintern directives, it never worked for an effective and rigorous application of the united front in Italy.

== See also ==
- XVI Congress of the Italian Socialist Party
