= I Congress of the Communist Party of Italy =

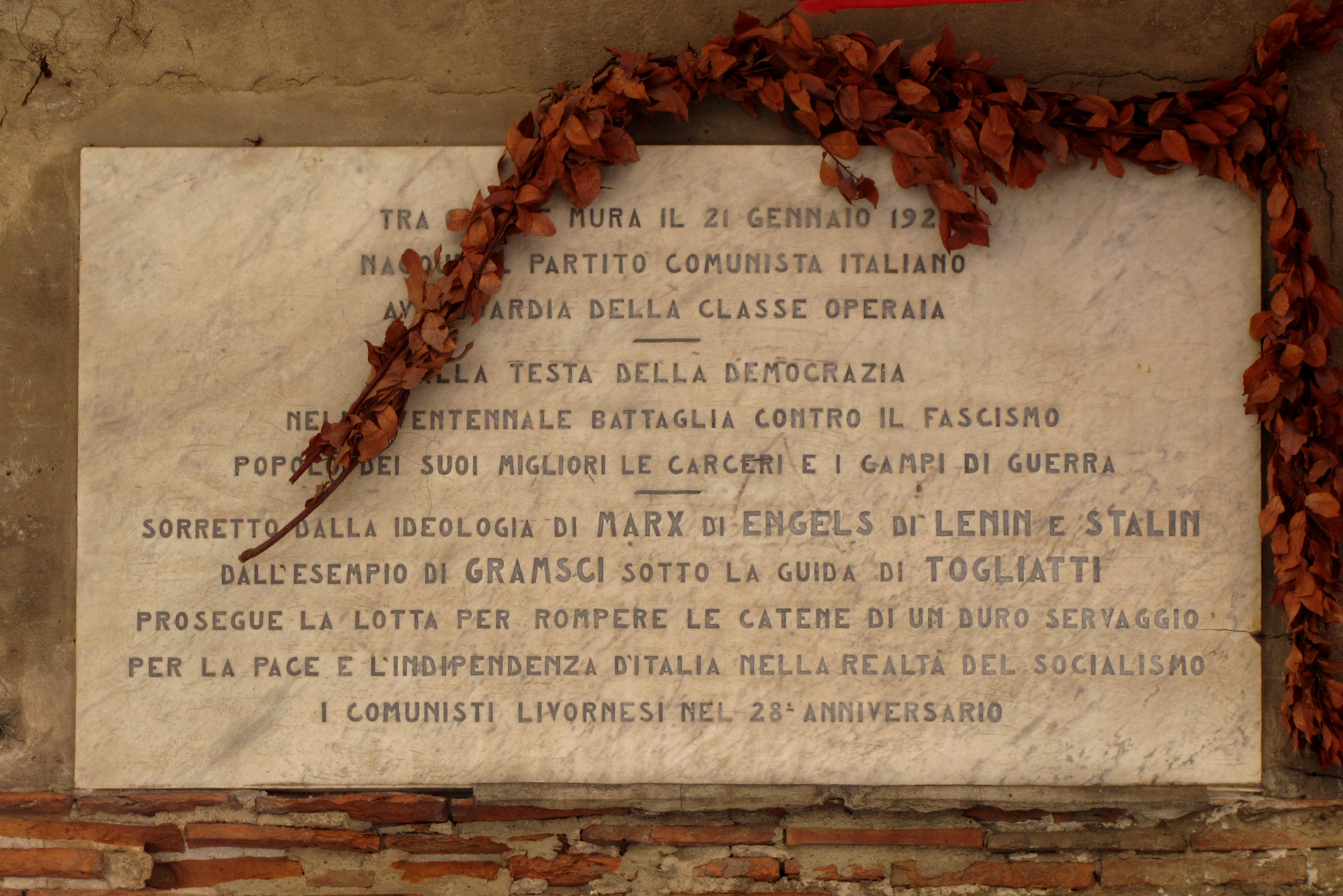
Plaque commemorating the birth of the PCdI affixed in 1949 at the San Marco theatre, Livorno

The I Congress of the Communist Party of Italy was held in Livorno on 21 January 1921, following the split of the communist fraction at the end of the XVII Congress of the Italian Socialist Party (PSI).

== Background ==
The Italian Socialist Party (PSI) joined the Communist International in 1919. Although the party had adopted left-wing positions against the First World War it nevertheless contained a broad range of political opinions. While the majority of the party was pro-Bolshevik by 1919, a strong reformist right wing remained within the party, led by one of its founders, the leader of the parliamentary group Filippo Turati. Giacinto Menotti Serrati, leader of the majority grouping in the PSI, had led the party into the Comintern but was nevertheless opposed to expelling right wing figures, fearing this would alienate a large section of the party’s supporters.

The uneasy internal arrangements of the party were upset by the II Congress of the Comintern in July and August 1920, which laid down 21 conditions for all parties to remain within the International; one of the conditions was that all reformists - such as Turati - were to be expelled. In September 1920, the left wing of the PSI secured approval for an agenda for its forthcoming XVII Congress signed by which proposed the complete and unconditional adoption of the Comintern’s 21 points.

== The communist fraction ==
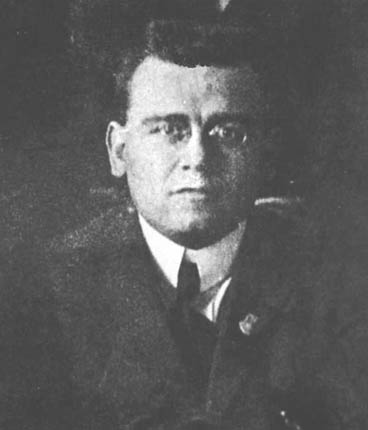
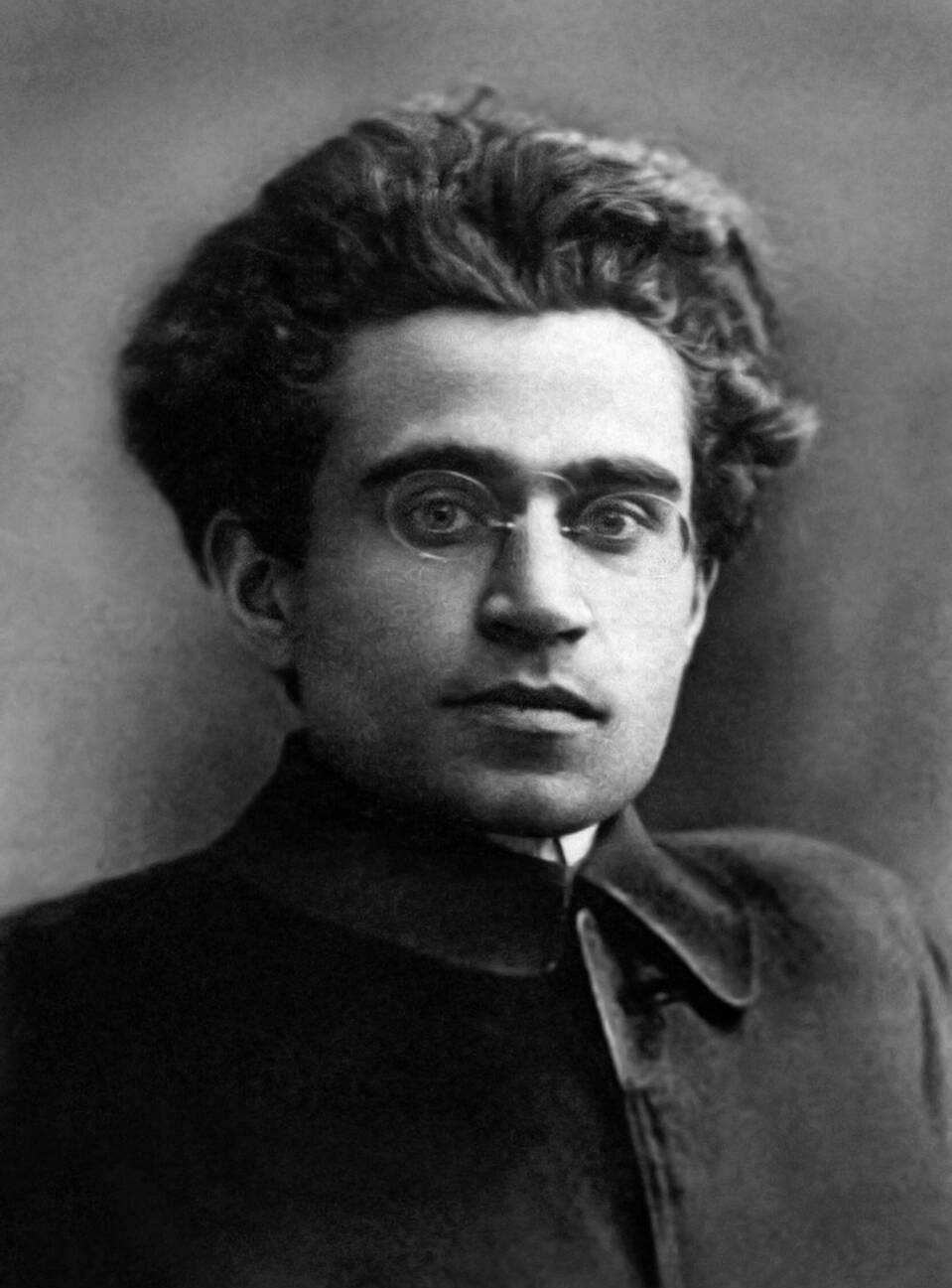
Amadeo Bordiga (pictured left) and Antonio Gramsci, who led the communist fraction.

Within the PSI the two main leaders of the communist fraction were Amadeo Bordiga and Antonio Gramsci. They mobilised their supporters in the months before the Congress to follow the Comintern line and expel the right-wingers. The fraction agreed a manifesto-programme signed in Milan on 15 October 1920 by Bordiga, Gramsci, Misiano, Terracini, Bombacci, Repossi, Fortichiari and Polano. A few days later the fraction gained the approval of Zinoviev who, also on behalf of Lenin, Trotsky and Bukharin, underlining how it constituted the only support of the International in Italy.

The motion that the communists intended to present to the Congress was ratified in a conference held at the Municipal Theater of Imola between 28 and 29 November, and for this reason it was also called the Imola motion. The text aimed at the transformation of the Socialist Party into a Communist Party, making it necessary to exclude all those who voted in the Congress "against the Communist program of the Party and against the commitment to complete observance of the 21 conditions of admission to the International». The Imola conference did not explicitly deal with the path to follow in the event that the motion remained in the minority at the congress, but the hypothesis of the split was already concretely outlined.

== The PSI Congress ==
The debate at the Socialist Party Congress took place in a particularly turbulent climate and interruptions and tumults were frequent. The International delegates, Khristo Kabakchiev and Mátyás Rákosi, supported the motion from the Communist fraction, harshly attacking Serrati. Their support was not however sufficient to prevent the majority of Congress delegates from supporting an alternative motion from Serrati, emphasising the importance of maintaining party unity and rejecting expulsions. On the morning of 21 January 1921, the declaration of the results of the voting made clear that the Communist fraction’s motion had not succeeded, while Serrati’s opposition to expulsions commanded the support of the party. Bordiga therefore proceeded to formalize a split of the Communist fraction from the rest of the party.

== The birth of the PCd'I ==
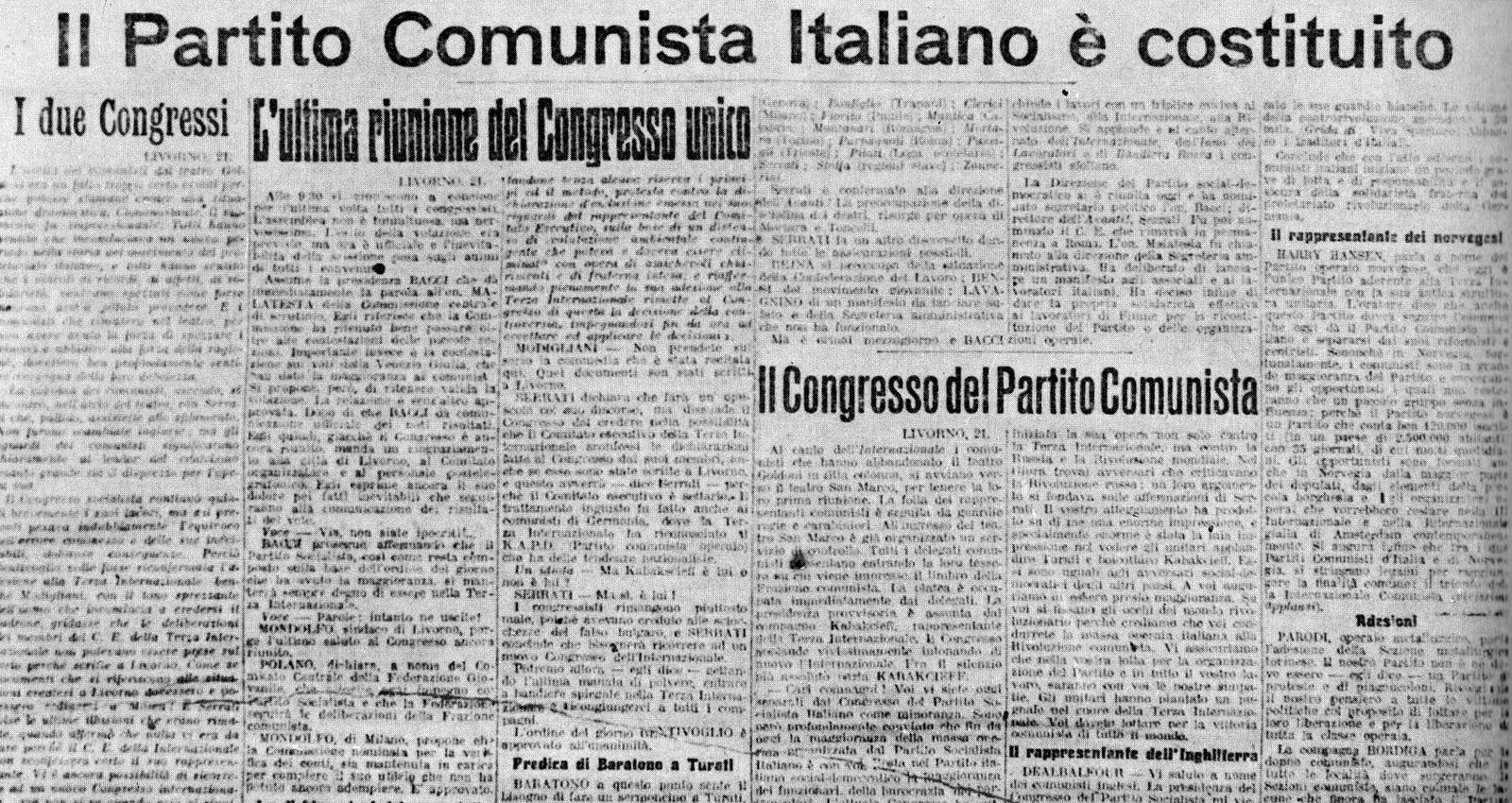
Front page of L'Ordine Nuovo of 22 January 1921 with an account of the birth of the Communist Party of Italy

The delegates of the communist fraction walked out of the PSI Congress singing of the Internationale and, following Bordiga, proceeded to hold the founding Congress of the Communist Party at the it:Teatro San Marco. It was a makeshift arrangement: the building, used as a warehouse for materials of the Royal Italian Army during the First World War, had no seats, and the delegates sheltered with umbrellas from the rain that entered through the broken glass of the windows and from the holes in the roof.

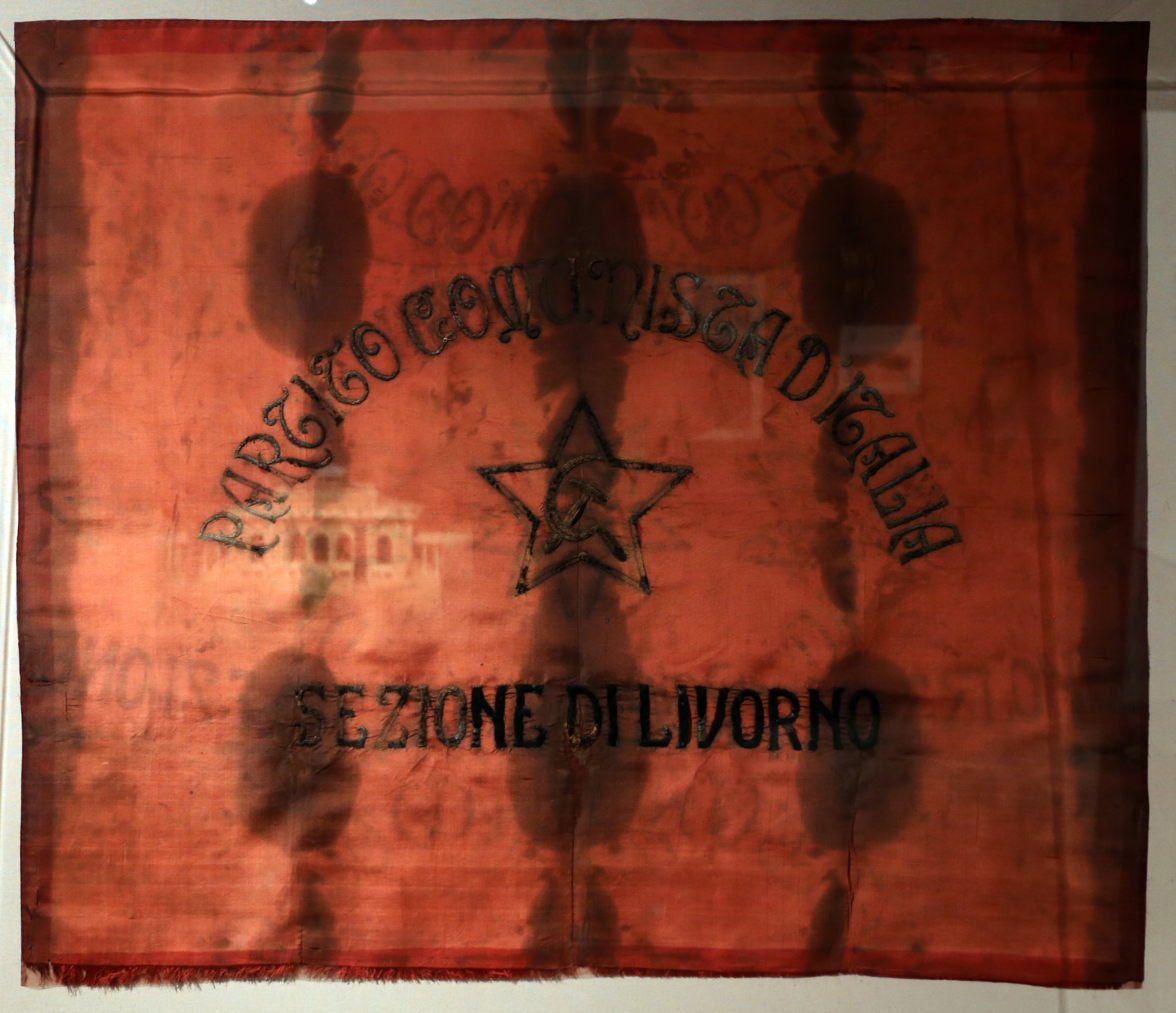
Flag of the Livorno section of the Communist Party of Italy, preserved in the local Museum of the City

The Congress was held over two sessions during the single day of Friday 21 January, and limited itself to giving the new party an initial organizational framework. The morning session hosted the greetings of the foreign delegates Kabakchiev, Rosa Bloch, Jules Humbert-Droz, Balfour, de:Paul Böttcher and Arvid G. Hansen and the interventions of Bruno Fortichiari on behalf of the Central Committee of the fraction; by Luigi Polano for the young people; by Ortensia De Meo for the women and four workers and trade unionists. In the second session, an agenda signed by Fortichiari was voted on which declared the Communist Party of Italy (PCd’I) - Section of the Communist International established. This name would remain in force until the dissolution of the International in 1943, when the party re-emerged under the name of the Italian Communist Party after being forced underground in 1926 by the Fascist regime.

The congress chose Milan as the headquarters of the party and, as its official organ, the biweekly Communist. Finally the Central Committee was elected, consisting of Bordiga, Grieco, Parodi, Sessa, Tarsia, Polano, Gramsci, Terracini, Belloni, Bombacci, Gennari, Misiano, Marabini, Repossi and Fortichiari. The role of general secretary was not established, although it was in fact fulfilled by Bordiga.

The establishment of the PCd'I was completed a few days later, on 27 January, with the Florence Congress of the Socialist Youth Federation, which decided by a very large majority to withdraw its membership of the Socialist Party to join the new Communist Party, under the new name of the Italian Communist Youth Federation.
