= XVI Congress of the Italian Socialist Party =

The XVI Congress of the Italian Socialist Party was held at the Teatro Comunale di Bologna from 5 to 8 October 1919. The assembly voted by acclamation for the party to join the Communist International, ratifying a decision already taken by the Directorate in March and becoming the first party outside the USSR to join.

== Debate at the Congress ==
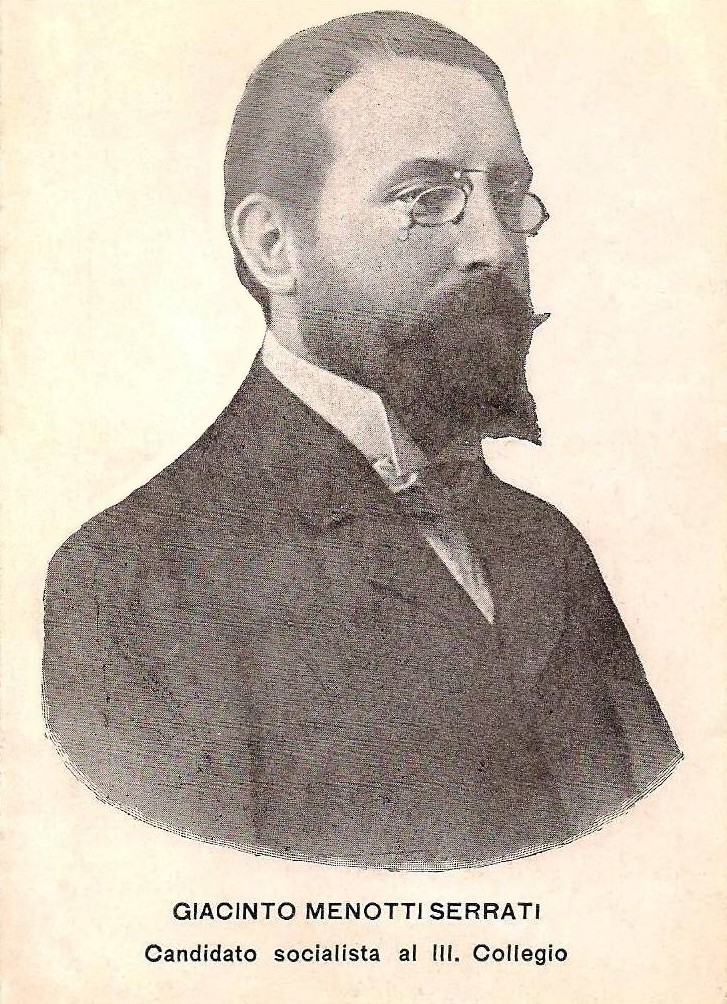
Giacinto Menotti Serrati

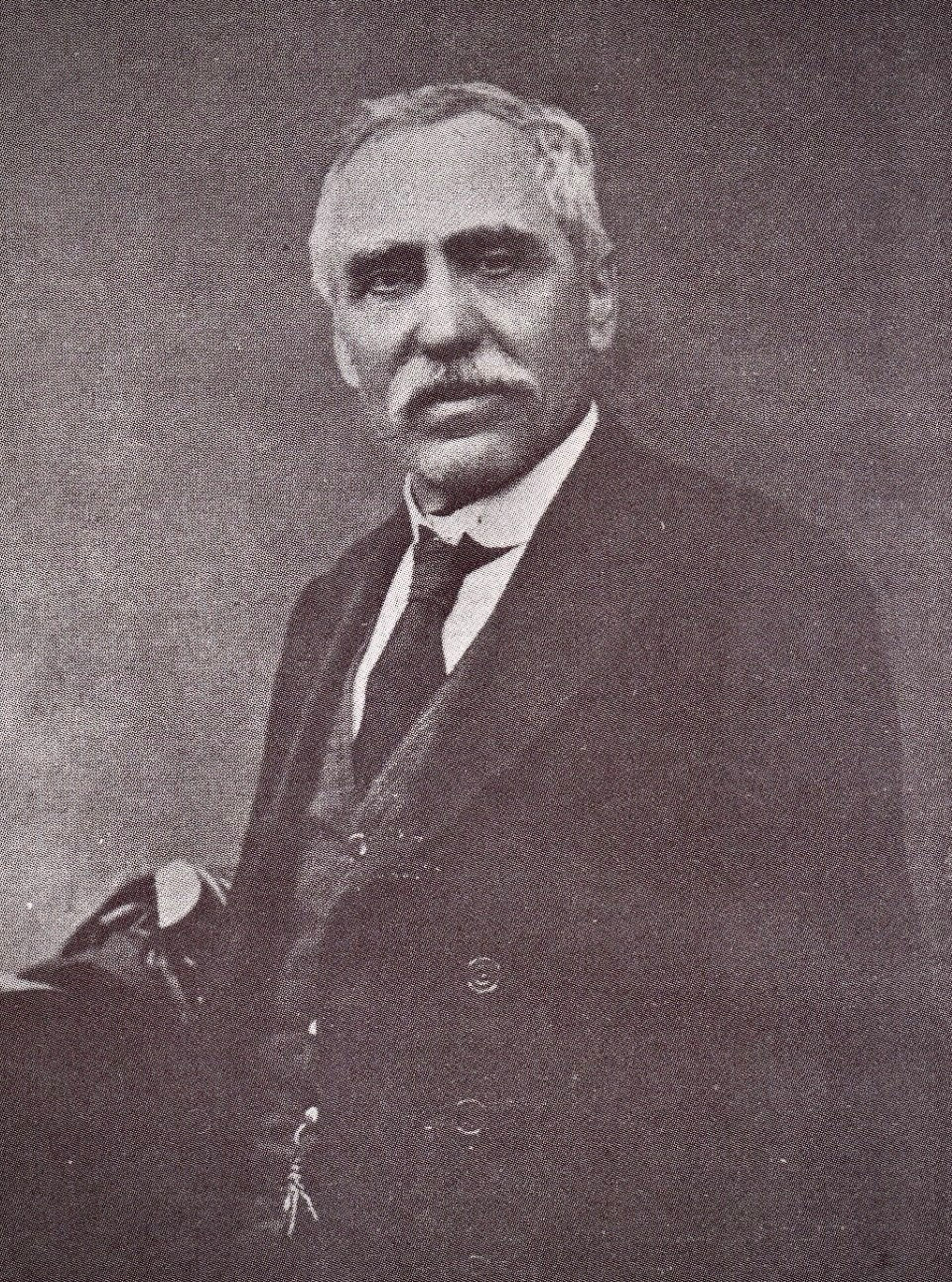
Costantino Lazzari

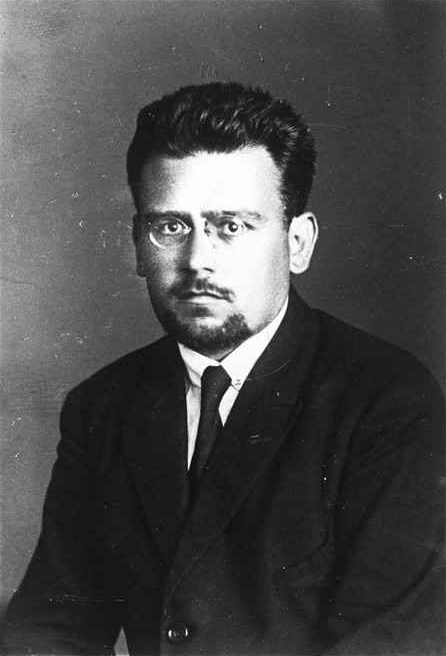
Amadeo Bordiga

Considering the old Genoa Program to be outdated, the assembly discussed three motions: one put forward by the majority maximalist group led by Giacinto Menotti Serrati; a second by the national secretary Costantino Lazzari (which the reformists of Filippo Turati supported) and the third by the hard-line minority of Amadeo Bordiga. Both Serrati and Bordiga proposed that the party should join the Third International. However, while Serrati's maximalists believed that the revolution was inevitable and awaited it passively, Bordiga's faction believed it was a duty to actively bring about a revolution.

Lazzari agreed with Serrati that the final objective of the proletarian revolution had to be brought about through "revolutionary action" and the overthrow of the democratic system, but wanted the party to continue to accept reformists as members. Indeed Lazzari's motion was the only one not to expressly mention the October Revolution and the Third International. While others called for the violent overthrow of the bourgeois State, Lazzari reiterated the need to resort exclusively to legal methods.

Amadeo Bordiga proposed a motion that would change the name of the party to that of "Communist Party" and expel the reformist socialists of Turati. In fact Bordiga was convinced of the incompatibility between socialism and democracy, given that “the proletariat could really take over political power only by wresting it from the capitalist minority through armed struggle, with revolutionary action”. He believed that the party should not have participated in the elections. His current was called "abstentionist communist".

Ultimately Serrati’s motion prevailed with 47,966 votes, against the 14,935 votes for Lazzari’s position and just 3,350 for Bordiga’s. The minority reformist group led by Turati voted for Lazzari's motion.

== Significance ==
The Bologna Congress marked a decisive turn towards support for Russian Revolution and emulation of Bolshevik methods in the Italian Socialist Party. The Congress supported the suppression of parliament and the dictatorship of the proletariat in Russia. The few dissenting voices around Turati were defeated by a motion from Serrati which committed the Italian Socialist Party to stand as a defender of the Soviets. Serrati addressed them thus: "What is reality today if not revolution? What is more real, more true today than this resurgence in every country of the proletarian classes to conquer their complete emancipation? What is truer in today's world than the failure of the bourgeoisie and the triumph of the revolution? And so we are in reality, we are on the ground of facts and you, dear reformist comrades, you comrades of the right wing, are out of your time, you are out of reality." In taking these positions the party was accepting the need for violent revolution as the necessary "midwife of history". After this the maximalists clearly aimed not at an electoral victory but at the overthrow of the bourgeois state in order to create the socialist republic.

The party had always firmly opposed Italy’s involvement in the First World War, but after it sharpened its political line in Bologna it went further; there was a move to expel individual members who had favoured intervention in the war or who had volunteered to fight, on the grounds that they had broken ranks with the party of the working class and were effectively class traitors. (The deputy it:Mario Cavallari, who had a past as an interventionist and war volunteer, had already been expelled in August.) The congress did decide to rule out any working arrangements or accommodations with any non-socialist parties.

== Reformist and abstentionist criticisms ==
The reformists, through Turati, spoke of a "mythical infatuation" with Bolshevism which was distancing the proletarian classes from the revolution, keeping them in the "messianic expectation of a violent miracle" and distracting them "from the assiduous and thoughtful work of gradual conquest which is the only revolution".

Equally harsh criticisms of the maximalist line came from the left of the PSI: Amadeo Bordiga gave life to a fraction called the abstentionists, which placed itself in complete opposition to the bourgeois system by refusing to participate in the elections. Bordiga also requested that opposing the armed revolution be declared incompatible with party membership, as neither the maximalists nor Serrati’s followers were willing to assume “the responsibility for the split”.

== Further developments ==
After Bologna, the Italian Socialist Party clearly distanced itself from the tradition of the Risorgimento. The revolutionary platform it adopted caused difficulty for elected socialists in local government, who were administering towns and cities rather than preparing to overthrow the state. None of the groupings in the party, though they spoke about the need to overcome capitalism and establish socialism, was able to propose any concrete and immediate objective for the struggles in which the workers' and peasants' movements were actually engaged. This meant that during the entire Biennio Rosso they were unable to offer any effective political leadership. In particular, the ineptitude of the maximalist leadership has often been underlined, exemplifying a verbal extremism and a wishful revolutionism that never managed to follow its words with concrete actions. As Angelo Tasca put it: “The party continues to get drunk on words, to draw up Soviet projects on paper, abandoning the factory commissions in the North and the land-hungry peasants in the South to their own devices.”

The reformist faction of the Socialists entered the Orlando government, with Leonida Bissolati, Ivanoe Bonomi and Agostino Berenini accepting cabinet roles. In the November general elections, the Socialist Party made a significant advance, bringing the number of elected representatives in the Chamber of Deputies to 156.

== See also ==
- XVII Congress of the Italian Socialist Party
