= Emilio Zannerini =

Italian politician (1891–1969)

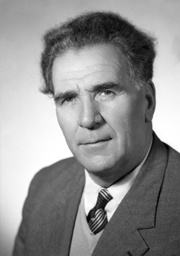

Member of the Constituent Assembly of Italy
- In office 15 July 1946 – 31 January 1948

Member of the Senate of the Republic
- In office 25 January 1951 – 24 June 1953

Member of the Chamber of Deputies
- In office 22 July 1953 – 11 June 1958

Personal details
- Born: 8 April 1891; Massa Marittima, Province of Grosseto, Kingdom of Italy
- Died: 9 June 1969 (aged 78); Grosseto, Italy
- Political party: Italian Socialist Party

Emilio Zannerini (8 April 1891 – 9 June 1969) was an Italian partisan and politician who served as a member of the Constituent Assembly of Italy (1946–1948), Senator (1951–1953), and Deputy (1953–1958).
