= Francesco Misiano =

Italian politician and film producer

Francesco Misiano (26 June 1884 – 16 August 1936) was an Italian communist politician and film producer.

== Early life ==
Francesco Misiano was born on 26 June 1884 in Ardore, Italy. In the early years of the twentieth century he moved to Naples due to his work as an employee of the State Railways. There he joined the Italian Socialist Party (PSI) in 1907, and three years later he was initiated into Freemasonry in the "Giovanni Bovio" lodge. He abandoned freemasonry in 1914, the day after the Ancona congress of the PSI, which he chose as his political direction.

Misiano was transferred to Turin, where he became a manager of the railway workers' union. A convinced anti-interventionist and anti-militarist, he was arrested for taking part in the anti-war demonstration of 17 May 1915. After serving five months in prison, in March 1916 he was called up and assigned to Cuneo.

To continue the anti-militarist propaganda within the army, he applied for an officers' training course. In view of his well-known ideas, however, the request was rejected. Indeed, on 13 May, without any warning, his company was ordered to leave for the front the next day. That night, together with other soldiers, Misiano left the barracks to say goodbye to his family and, when he was about to return, he learned the news that he alone, of all the absent soldiers, had been declared a deserter.

== Exile ==
To avoid certain punishment condemnation, he fled to Zürich, where he came into contact with many Italian deserters, including Bruno Misefari, the "Anarchist of Calabria". In Zürich he worked with the Swiss Socialist Party and in July 1916 he took the place of Angelica Balabanoff as chairman of L'Avvenire del Lavoro, a newspaper founded in 1898. Under his leadership, as well as launching a campaign for the expulsion of reformist elements within the party, highlighted clear opposition to the war and the defense of neutrality, in line with the resolutions adopted by the Zimmerwald Conference in September 1915. He got to know Lenin, by whom he was invited to Moscow to deal with propaganda in the Italian language; he gave several lectures in Geneva on the situation following the Bolshevik revolution; and he was the creator of the Society of the Homeless, that soon had branches in several cities.

On 9 May 1918, following the discovery of some bombs in the Limmat river and in the headquarters of the newspaper, the Zürich police suspected that he was one of the promoters of an insurrectional project and proceeded to arrest him. When he learned of a probable second arrest due to the general strike of 9 November 1918 which had led the authorities to place the city under martial law, he decided to go to Moscow, where he had been invited by Balabanoff to edit a newspaper addressed to the volunteers of the Italian expeditionary force in Russia. Stopping in Munich and meeting the leaders of the Spartacus League, Misiano made propaganda among the Italian prisoners awaiting repatriation.

He then went to Berlin, where in January 1919 he was involved in the Spartacist uprising. Together with other Italian revolutionaries who had joined the Spartacists, he fought for six days to defend the building of the socialist newspaper Vorwärts against attacks by the Freikorps. When they ran out of ammunition, Misiano was among those arrested who were not shot. Instead he was sentenced to ten months' imprisonment. He was released on bail thanks to the intervention of the PSI, through Oddino Morgari and Gustavo Sacerdote. However he was unable to return to Zürich due to the expulsion order agreed on 4 November by the Federal Council «for endangering the security of Switzerland».

== Socialist parliamentary career ==
In the 1919 Italian general election Misiano stood as a Socialist Party candidate in both Naples and Turin while he was still in prison in Germany. He was elected in both constituencies, and on his return from Germany he opted to serve the Turin constituency. He also accepted the position of secretary of the Naples Trade Union Centre Chamber of Labor of Naples, where he supported the movement against the high cost of living and the workers’ occupation of factories. However, his greatest commitment at this time was to the founding of the Italian Communist Party. Misiano began to collaborate with Amadeo Bordiga's newspaper Il Soviet, where he published a series of articles in which, trying to find a line of mediation between the socialist project and the positions of the Third International, he hoped for a party in Italy “connected to the masses, tactically flexible and at the same time a faithful expression of the working class.”

After his return to Italy he was subjected to a systematic campaign of persecution and assaults due to his past as a deserter, for which crime, judged in absentia, he was deemed liable to be shot, though his sentence was eventually commuted to life imprisonment and subsequently to a suspended sentence of 10 years.

The persecution began in August 1920 when Misiano reached Fiume, where he planned to carry out a series of propaganda rallies to arouse the working class in against Gabriele D'Annunzio. In response, D’Annunzio issued a decree of proscription which amounted to a summary death sentence. D’Annunzio's followers found Misiano on a beach and he had to escape by swimming out to sea. He was able to reach Trieste where, now suffering from pneumonia, he was admitted to a hospital where he was placed under the protection of socialist guards, since not even the doctors or nurses could be trusted not to betray him.

In December 1920 a group of fascists besieged Misiano in a bar in Bologna, and he was forced to flee. The police took no action.

== Communist parliamentary career ==
In January 1921, Misiano participated in the XVII Congress of the Italian Socialist Party and in the subsequent foundation of the Communist Party of Italy (PCI). He joined the new party's central committee, representing left-wing maximalists and, as a result of his defection, he also became one of its parliamentary deputies.

Misiano continued to be the focus of a deadly hate campaign by the emerging fascist movement in Italy. In March 1921 his house in Naples was targeted by 150 fascists who threatened him, but he was able to escape. The episode was reported in a light hearted manner by Corriere della Sera.

In the 1921 Italian general election, he was re-elected in Turin with 52,893 preferences (he headed the list, becoming the city's first elected Communist, ahead of the other, Antonio Gramsci), since in Naples, while achieving 3,570 preferences, the PCI did not reach the quorum necessary for a seat. During the inaugural session of the XXVI legislature on 13 June, he was attacked inside the Montecitorio by about thirty newly elected fascist deputies (led by Silvio Gai and Giuseppe Bottai), beaten and forced to leave Parliament.

The hostility to Misiano was not confined to squadristi. On 20 December 1921 the Chamber of Deputies voted by majority to revoke his electoral mandate, thereby spelling him from the chamber. The official reason was that he had been "convicted of political crimes committed in German territory after the conclusion of the armistice", which cannot be judged "in the same way as that of our ex-prisoners of war", and on the fact that, once he had returned from Germany with a German passport stamped on 1 December, Misiano had presented himself only on 7 December 1919 to the Italian authorities to regularize his position and take advantage of the amnesty for deserters.

Recognized by a group of fascists within the Politeama Margherita he was again accused of being a deserter and forced to leave. To escape further violence, he went to the Soviet Union for a while on 23 June, from which he returned the following October. To avoid further reprisals, he then preferred places considered safer: Piombino, where he participated in a series of demonstrations in favor of the release of Nicola Sacco and Bartolomeo Vanzetti, and Novi Ligure, where he commemorated the anniversary of the Russian revolution.

In November 1921, after parliamentary approval, a case was brought against him for desertion in a military tribunal in Palermo. The trial attracted large and hostile crowds when he appeared in his own defence. He was convicted and sentenced to ten years’ imprisonment, although this sentence was suspended in accordance with the provisions of an already-existing amnesty. Thus left him free of prison but a marked man. in early December Misiano was again assaulted by fascist deputies in parliament and had to be protected by his communist colleagues. The fascists called in other deputies to walk out if the chamber when Misiano entered it, and many non-fascists did so.

When he realized that the fury towards his person did not cease, on 15 December 1921, not without some bureaucratic difficulties, he crossed the border into Austria and made his way to the Soviet Union, where he settled together with his wife Maria, married in 1911, and their two daughters, Carolina and Ornella.

== In the USSR ==
In 1924 International Red Aid entrusted Misiano with the task of founding a film production company in Moscow, which took the name of Mežrabpom, of which he became president. It was with Mežrabpom that Misiano began his career as a film producer. The company was to produce 160 works of fiction and 240 documentaries including Mother, The End of St. Petersburg and Storm over Asia by Vsevolod Pudovkin, Aelita by Yakov Protazanov, and Road to Life by Nikolai Ekk.

Misiano was the distributor in Germany of Sergei Eisenstein’s Battleship Potemkin, even managing to invite Douglas Fairbanks and Mary Pickford to Moscow in 1926. With Hitler in power in Germany, in 1933 he welcomed directors, screenwriters and intellectuals fleeing Nazism to the Mezrapbom. Among the better known names were Erwin Piscator, Hans Richter, Joris Ivens and Béla Balázs. In 1936, when Italy invaded Abyssinia, he asked to be sent to the Horn of Africa on an anti-fascist mission but he was denied.

During the early part of the Great Purge, Misiano fell into disgrace and was accused of "Trotskyist political deviations". Struck down by a serious illness, Misiano died in Moscow on 16 August 1936 at the age of 52.

His grandson is the Russian curator and theorist Victor Alexandrovich Misiano.
