= La Caricature =

La Caricature (The Caricature) may refer to:

- La Caricature (1830–1843), a satirical weekly published in Paris between 1830 and 1843 during the July Monarchy
- La Caricature (1880–1904), a satirical journal that was published in Paris between 1880 and 1904
