= Friedrich Adler =

Friedrich Adler may refer to:

- Friedrich Adler (architect) (1827–1908), German architect and archaeologist
- Friedrich Adler (writer) (1857–1938), Czech-Austrian politician
- Friedrich Adler (artist) (1878–1942), German artist and designer, murdered in Auschwitz
- Friedrich Adler (politician) (1879–1960), Austrian revolutionary politician, son of Viktor Adler
