= Giovanni Bacci =

Italian politician (1857–1928)

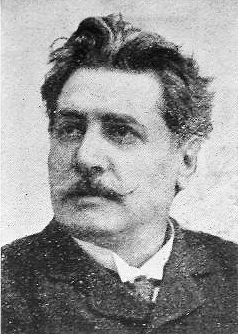

Personal details
- Born: 7 March 1857 Belforte all'Isauro
- Died: 9 August 1928 (aged 71) Milan, Kingdom of Italy
- Party: PSI (1903–1922)
- Occupation: Journalist, politician

Giovanni Bacci (7 March 1857 – 9 August 1928) was an Italian journalist and politician. He was one of the main leaders of the Italian Socialist Party (PSI).

== Career ==
Born in Belforte all'Isauro, near Urbino, Bacci was journalist and director of Rivista di Ferrara and La Provincia di Mantova. In 1903, he became a member of the PSI, and in 1912 he was appointed director of the party's newspaper Avanti!

In 1921, Bacci was elected as secretary of the PSI, which suffered a split that led to the foundation of the Communist Party of Italy. He led the party in the 1921 Italian general election held on 15 May. Under his leadership, the PSI was confirmed as the first party in the country with 24.7% of votes but lost 33 seats. After the election, Bacci resigned as party's leader. After the formation of the Italian fascist dictatorship of Benito Mussolini, Bacci was banned from politics and died few years later in 1928 in Milan.
