= Khristo Kabakchiev =

Bulgarian politician (1878–1940)

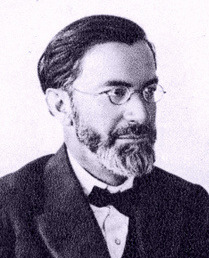
Khristo Kabakchiev in 1927.

Khristo Stefanov Kabakchiev (Bulgarian: Христо Стефанов Кабакчиев) (2 January 1878 – 6 October 1940) was a Bulgarian communist politician, revolutionary, journalist and historian.

== Biography ==
Kabakchiev, son of a teacher, was born in Galați, Romania. While studying in Bulgaria and Geneva he encountered socialist ideas, and in 1897 he joined the Bulgarian Workers' Social Democratic Party (BWSDP). When the party split in 1903, Kabachiev followed the more radical Narrow faction of Dimitar Blagoev; from 1905 he was a member of its Central Committee, and in 1908 he was made editor of its central organ as well as elected a deputy to the National Assembly. In 1919, the party was re-organized as the Bulgarian Communist Party (BCP) and joined the Comintern. Kabakchiev was a BCP delegate to the Second and Fourth Congress of the Comintern, held in 1920 and 1922 respectively.

After the failed September uprising of 1923, Kabakchiev was arrested and condemned to twelve and a half years' imprisonment. He was freed by an amnesty in 1926, and left for Vienna and then the Soviet Union. There, he joined the International Control Commission (ICC) of the Comintern, which he had been elected to in absentia in 1924.

By 1928, however, Kabakchiev had been removed from the BCP's Central Committee, and he was not re-elected to the ICC at the Sixth World Congress of the Communist International held in that year. Instead, he started teaching at the International Lenin School and worked as a researcher at the Marx–Engels–Lenin Institute in Moscow; he also joined the All-Union Communist Party (Bolsheviks).

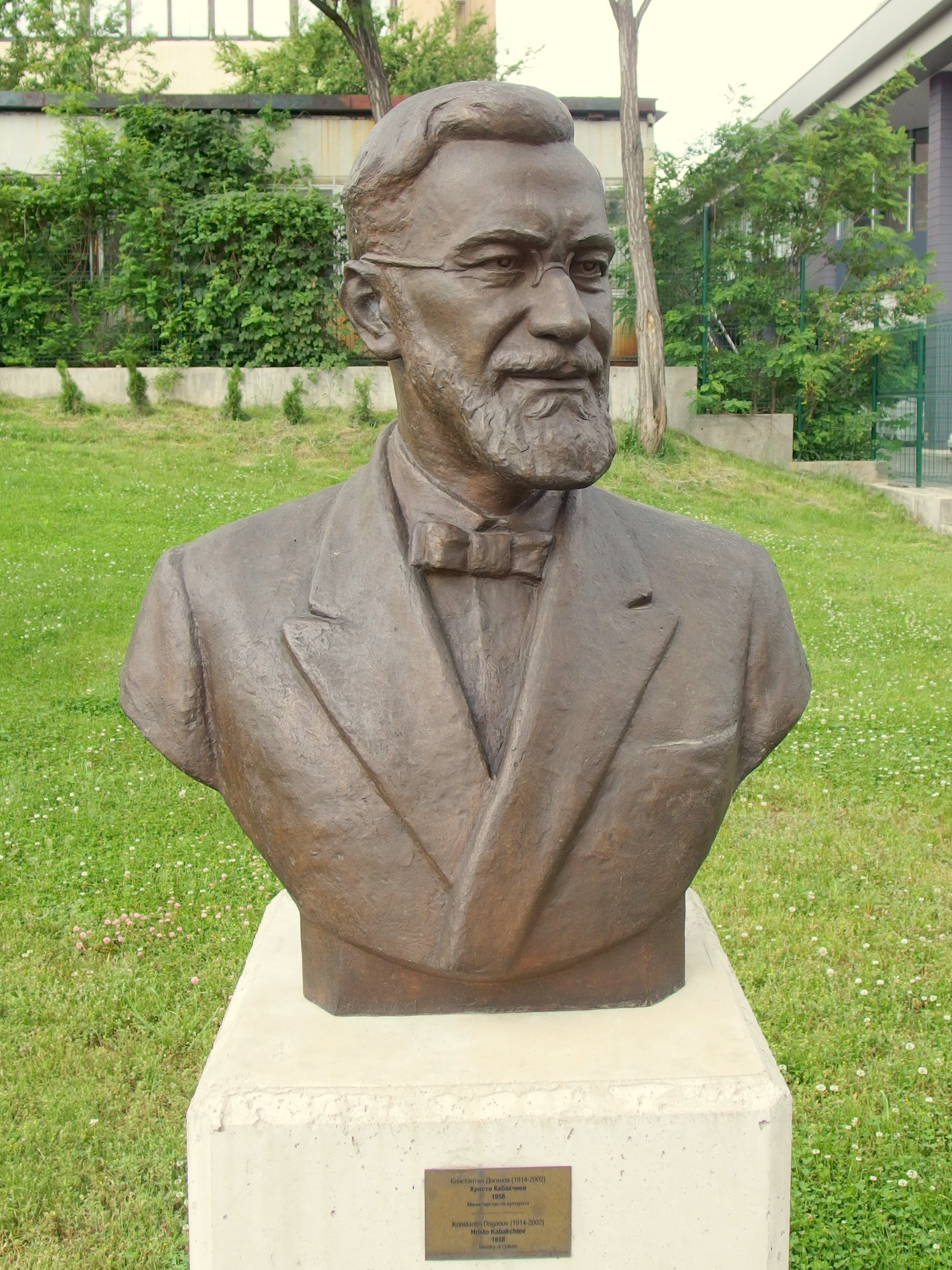
Bust of Khristo Kabakchiev at the Museum of Socialist Art in Sofia

Kabakchiev was briefly arrested in 1937 during the Great Purge, but was released the following year. After falling gravely ill, he died in Moscow in 1940.

The urn with the ashes of Khristo Kabakchiev was buried at the New Donskoye Cemetery in Moscow until the 1980s. In the 1980s, it was transported to his homeland and buried in the Central Sofia Cemetery.
