= Rosa Bloch =

Swiss politician and activist (1880–1922)

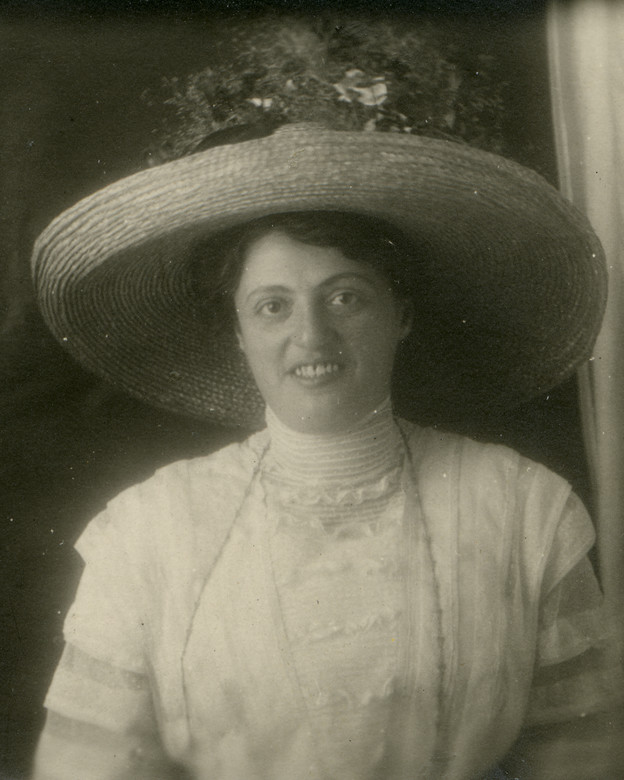
- Born: Rosa Bloch Guggenheim; 30 June 1880; Zurich, Switzerland
- Died: 13 July 1922 (aged 42); Zurich, Switzerland
- Occupations: Politician and activist
- Political party: Social Democratic Party of Switzerland; Communist Party of Switzerland

Rosa Bloch-Bollag (1880 – 13 July 1922) was a Swiss politician and activist who, as a member of the Swiss Socialist Party, led a women's demonstration against increases in food prices in 1918. In 1920, she was one of the founding members of the Swiss Communist Party.

== Biography ==
Born on 30 June 1880 in Zürich, Switzerland, Rosa Bloch was the daughter of the grain merchant Berthold Bloch and Julie Guggenheim. Brought up in a family of a poor Jewish merchant, Rosa once she gained her independence worked as a representative of a jewellery shop. Initially an anarchist, she joined the socialist party in 1912 but later became a Marxist. She proved to be a competent editor of the women workers' journal Die Vorkämperin, contributing articles which not only were politically engaging but were remarkably well drafted.

She married Siegfried Bollag, director of the Swiss Social Archives.

Highly intelligent and a talented orator, in early 1918 she joined the left wing of the Olten Action Committee and became actively involved in the women's socialist movement. That June, she organized an effective women's demonstration against rising food prices, presenting her claims to the Cantonal Council.

Also in 1918, she became the first president of the Socialist Party's Women's Committee. In 1921, after the Socialist Party had broken up, together with the other left-wingers she became a founding member of the Communist Party.

Rosa Bloch-Bollag died on 13 July 1922 in Zürich, after undergoing a goitre operation.
