= Bruno Fortichiari =

Italian politician and communist revolutionary

Bruno Fortichiari (8 February 1892 – 4 January 1981) was an Italian politician and communist revolutionary. He was among the founders of the Communist Party of Italy (PCd'I) in 1921.

== Biography ==
Fortichiari was born in Luzzara, in the Italian region of Emilia-Romagna. He began his activity as a journalist and socialist activist at an early age, and, in the early 1910s, he met Amadeo Bordiga. In December 1912, he was appointed responsible for the Milanese section of the Italian Socialist Party. He was the author of the order that expelled the pro-National Syndicalist and future Fascist ruler Benito Mussolini from the party in 1914, and, in contrast to Mussolini, was among the foremost opponents in first line to protest against the Italian intervention in World War I.

After the war, he was instrumental in all the events that led to the founding of the PCd'I in Livorno (21 January 1921). He was a member of the executive committee of the new grouping, together with Bordiga, Ruggero Grieco, Luigi Repossi and Umberto Terracini, with responsibility for the illegal activities against the increasing success of Fascist forces in repressing left-wing forces. He was elected to the Italian Chamber of Deputies in 1924.

When all the Italian Communist deputies were arrested (8 November 1926), Fortichiari was sentenced to five years of internment, but he was released after one year for being affected by tuberculosis. He moved to Milan, but here he met difficulties in finding a regular job, which were aggravated by his expulsion from the PCI in 1929.

During World War II, he came in contact with members of the Internationalist Communist Party, a group led by ex-PCI members who disagreed with the moderate politics of the party in opposition to Comintern demands. Despite the PCI's campaign against him, Fortichiari was readmitted to its ranks after the war, although he held secondary positions and was under a strict control of the party cadres, who were arguably weary of his intact charisma as the main figure inside an anti-Stalinist current.

In 1956, he was again expelled from the PCI. He remained active until his death, apart from a hiatus in 1965-1970, trying to collect the dissension against the party's official doctrine in the communist left movement.

Fortichiari died in Milan at the age of 88.
