= Rosselli =

Rosselli is an Italian surname.

== People ==
Notable people with the surname include:

- Alfonso Patiño Rosselli (1923–1985), Colombian jurist and diplomat
- Amelia Pincherle Rosselli (1870–1954), Italian writer
- Amelia Rosselli (1930–1996), an Italian poet
- Bernardo di Stefano Rosselli (1450–1526), Italian painter
- Carlo Rosselli (1899–1937), socialist Italian politician, journalist, historian, and brother of Nello Rosselli
- Cosimo Rosselli (1439 – after 1506), Italian painter
- Domenico Rosselli (c. 1439 – 1498), Italian sculptor
- Elbio Rosselli, Uruguayan President of the United Nations Security Council
- Francesco Rosselli (1445 – before 1513), Italian miniature painter
- Francesco Rosselli (composer) (c.1510 – after 1577), French Renaissance composer
- Giselle Rosselli, Australian singer-songwriter
- Guido Rosselli (born 1983), Italian professional basketball player
- Joe Rosselli (born 1972), American baseball player
- Lou Rosselli (born 1970), former American wrestler
- Luigi Rosselli, an Italian-born Australian architect
- Mary Rosselli Nissim (1864–1937), Italian artist and composer
- Mats Rosseli Olsen (born 1991), Norwegian professional ice hockey
- Matteo Rosselli (1578–1650), Italian painter
- Nello Rosselli (1900–1937), socialist Italian politician and historian, and brother of Carlo Rosselli
- Rex De Rosselli (1876–1941), American actor
- Sal Rosselli (born 1949), American labor leader

== Characters ==
- Valentina Rosselli

== See also ==
- Rosselli del Turco, historic noble family from Florence, Italy
- Contarini-Rosselli map, first printed world map showing the New World
- Rosselli-Gulienetti syndrome
- Zoila rosselli, species of sea snail
