= Max Ascoli =

Italian-American professor (1898–1978)

- Born: June 25, 1898; Ferrara, Italy
- Died: January 1, 1978 (aged 79); New York City
- Employer(s): New School for Social Research, University of Rome, University of Ferrara
- Spouses: Anna Maria Cochetti (Anna Maria Armi); Marion Rosenwald Ascoli
- Children: Peter Ascoli
- Parent(s): Enrico Ascoli, Adriana Finzi

Max Ascoli (June 25, 1898 – January 1, 1978) was an Italian-American professor of political philosophy and law at The New School for Social Research.

== Life and work ==
=== Italy ===
Ascoli was born in Ferrara, Italy on June 25, 1898, into an Italian Jewish family. He was the only child of Enrico Ascoli, a coal and lumber merchant, and Adriana Finzi. In 1920, he graduated in Law from the University of Ferrara. In 1921, he published a critical study of French socialist Georges Sorel. In 1924, he published a biography of philosopher Benedetto Croce. In 1928, he graduated in Philosophy from the University of Rome.

In 1928, Ascoli held the chair of Philosophy of Law at the University of Rome, but he was arrested. He accepted a post at the University of Cagliari (Sardinia) in 1929. Opposing the Italian fascist regime, he went into exile.

=== United States ===
In 1931, Ascoli received a Rockefeller Foundation scholarship and moved to the United States.

In June 1937, Ascoli's close friends, the anti-fascist brothers Carlo Rosselli and Nello Rosselli, were murdered by French right-wing agents of Benito Mussolini. After World War II, Ascoli brought their families, including their mother and widows, to the United States, where they remained for several years. In 1938, Ascoli teamed up with a noted writer and correspondent Dorothy Thompson. They went on a lecture circuit warning Americans about the dangers of fascism. He became an American citizen in 1939.

Ascoli met Alvin Johnson during his time with the Rockefeller Foundation and later joined The New School for Social Research that Johnson co-founded in New York. He was active in the Mazzini Society, an anti-fascist organization founded in 1939 by Italian intellectuals who had fled fascist Italy. Ascoli founded a number of other important cultural organizations in the US, including the Handicrafts Development Incorporated, a private organization that helped artists and artisans in Italy.

For many years, Ascoli taught at the New School for Social Research, becoming dean of the Graduate School (1939–41). He left the New School to serve the government for two years under Nelson A. Rockefeller, then Coordinator of Inter-American Affairs. He then went on to focus on a new magazine.

During World War II, Ascoli worked for the Office of Strategic Services under Nelson Rockefeller. He was assigned to go to Latin America as the OSS feared the Axis powers were trying to make inroads in such countries as Argentina, Mexico, and Brazil.

During the course of his career, Ascoli would teach at a number of prominent US institutions: Yale, Columbia, Chicago, North Carolina, and Harvard.

=== The Reporter and art ===
In 1949, Ascoli joined James Reston to found The Reporter, an influential liberal magazine for some two decades. Its circulation peaked at 215,000 readers. In 1968, Ascoli merged the publication with Harper's Magazine.

In the early years of its publication, the magazine had a scoop with an article on the "China Lobby": a group of Republican lawmakers, including Richard Nixon, who were being paid to lobby by the forces of Chiang Kai-shek.

Contributors included: Dean Acheson, James Baldwin, McGeorge Bundy, Isaac Deutscher, Theodore Draper, John Kenneth Galbraith, Gertrude Himmelfarb, Irving Howe, Henry Kissinger, Irving Kristol, Boris Pasternak, Eugene V. Rostow, Arthur Schlesinger, Jr., Peter Viereck, and Edmund Wilson.

Among his staff were: Douglas Cater, his Washington correspondent who later joined the Johnson administration, Meg Greenfield, who succeeded Douglas Cater as Washington correspondent and later became an editor at the Washington Post, Claire Sterling, Italian correspondent, and Edmund Taylor, French correspondent.

His work with CADMA (Committee for the Assistance and Distribution of Materials to Artisans), which was headed by theorist and art critic Carlo Ludovico Ragghianti, and the House of Italian Handicraft supported the 1950-53 partially US-Government funded exhibition Italy at Work: Her Renaissance in Design Today co-curated by Meyric R. Rogers and Charles Nagel, Jr.

== Personal life and death ==
Ascoli was married twice. His first wife was Italian poet Anna Maria Cochetti (pen name Anna Maria Armi); he divorced her in 1940. His second wife was Marion Rosenwald Ascoli, whom he married in 1940. Marion was the daughter of CEO of the Sears, Roebuck and Company, Julius Rosenwald. (She was also previously married to Alfred K. Stern, whom she divorced in 1936.) She had been chairwoman and president of the Citizens Committee for Children of New York and previously president of the New York Fund for Children and of the Northside Center for Child Development in Harlem. Marion Ascoli died in 1990, aged 88. Their son is Peter Ascoli, author of Julius Rosenwald, a book about his maternal grandfather.

Ascoli died after a long illness at his home in Manhattan on January 1, 1978, at the age of 79.

== Works ==
The Immigration History Research Center Archives, University of Minnesota Libraries, houses his papers.

His books include criticism of Italian fascist corporatism.

=== Books written ===
- Vie dalla Croce (1924)
- Saggi Vichiani (1928)
- Gíustizia: Saggio di Filosofia del Diritto (1930)
- Intelligence in Politics (1936)
- Fascism: Who Benefits? (1939)
- War Aims and America's Aims (1941)
- Power of Freedom (1949)

=== Books co-written ===
- Fascism for Whom? with Arthur Feiler (1938)

=== Books edited ===
- Political and Economic Democracy, edited by Max Ascoli and Fritz Lehmann (1937)
- Fall of Mussolini, His Own Story, translated from the Italian by Frances Frenaye, edited and with a preface by Max Ascoli (1948)
- Reporter Reader (1956)
- Our Times: The Best from the Reporter (1960)
- Reporter Reader (1969)

=== Articles ===
- Articles for Foreign Affairs

== Sources ==
- Null, Gary; Carl Stone (1976). The Italian-Americans. Harrisburg, PA: Stackpole Books. pp. 95–96.
- Vericella, Diana (1999). Carpetto, George; Evanac, Diane M. (eds.). Italian Americans of the Twentieth Century. Tampa: Loggia Press. pp. 18–19.
- "Ascoli, Max, Papers". University of Minnesota.
- "Max Ascoli Papers". Boston University. Archived from the original on 16 October 2013.
