= Alberto Cianca =

Italian journalist and politician (1884–1966)

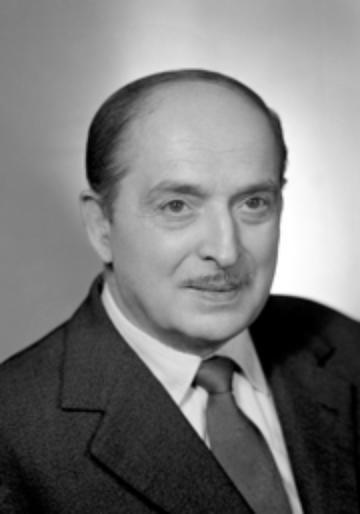

Member of the Senate of the Republic
- In office 25 June 1953 – 15 May 1963
- Constituency: Senigallia-Jesi

Member of the Constituent Assembly
- In office 25 June 1946 – 31 January 1948
- Constituency: Italy at-large

Personal details
- Born: 1 January 1884 Rome, Kingdom of Italy
- Died: 8 January 1966 (aged 82) Rome, Italy
- Party: UN (1924–1926); PdA (1944–1947); PSI (1947–1966)

Alberto Cianca (1 January 1884 – 8 January 1966) was an Italian journalist and anti-fascist politician. He edited several significant publications, including Il Mondo, and served in the Parliament and Senate.

== Early life and education ==
Cianca was born in Rome on 1 January 1884. He had a bachelor's degree in law.

== Career ==
Cianca started his career as a journalist and worked as a parliamentary reporter for the Rome-based newspaper La Tribuna. Then he worked for Secolo in Milan and later, he served as the editor-in-chief of Il Messaggero in Roma from which he resigned in 1921. Then he worked for L'Ora.

Cianca was the director of Il Mondo from its start in 1922 to its closure in 1926. The paper was the most significant opposition publication against Fascist government of Benito Mussolini. Cianca also edited another anti-fascist publication, Il Becco Giallo, a weekly satirical magazine.

=== Exile ===
In 1927 Cianca left Italy to avoid from being arrested and settled in Paris. There he edited some publications and involved in the establishment of an anti-Fascist resistance movement, Giustizia e Libertà. In the establishment of the Giustizia e Libertà he collaborated with Carlo Rosselli, Nello Rosselli, Emilio Lussu, Alberto Tarchiani, Fausto Nitti and Gaetano Salvemini. Cianca managed to resume the publication of Il Becco Giallo in Paris, and also, he and Carlo Rosselli edited a weekly publication of Giustizia e Libertà which was also entitled Giustizia e Libertà. In fact, Rosselli was the editor of the weekly between 1934 and his death in 1937, and Cianca succeeded him in the post.

When World War II broke out and France was occupied by Nazi German forces Cianca took refuge in the United States. He involved in the establishment of the Mazzini Society in New York City in 1940 which was one of the antifascist organizations founded by Italian political exiles in the United States. There he met his future wife, Carol Lunetta Cianca. Alberto Cianca and his close ally Alberto Tarchiani were very active in the society dealing with its administrative operations. Cianca was also named the president of the society's New York branch. Following the end of the Fascist rule, Cianca and other Italian exiles returned to Italy which led to the end of the Mazzini Society.

== Later years and death ==
Upon his return to Italy Cianca became the leader of the Action Party (PdA). He was a member of the National Council and a minister in the first cabinet of Alcide De Gasperi. Cianca was among the few elected members of the Action Party to the Constituent Assembly in 1946 and also, the last secretary of the Action Party before its closure. Then Cianca joined the Italian Socialist Party (PSI) and was elected a senator on its lists in the elections in 1953 and 1958.

Cianca served several times as the president of the board of arbitrators of Italian journalists. He died in Rome on 8 January 1966.
