= Il Becco Giallo =

Anti-Fascist satirical magazine in Italy (1924–1926)

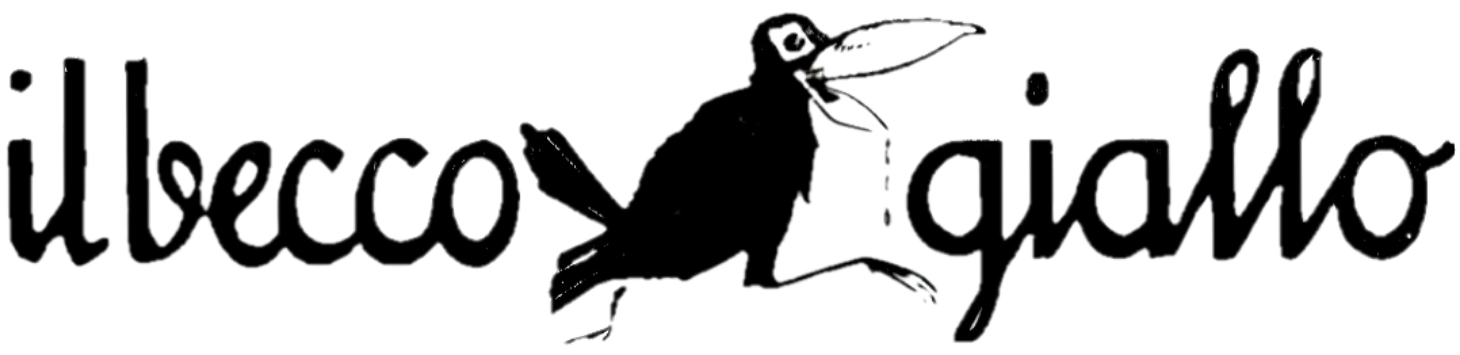

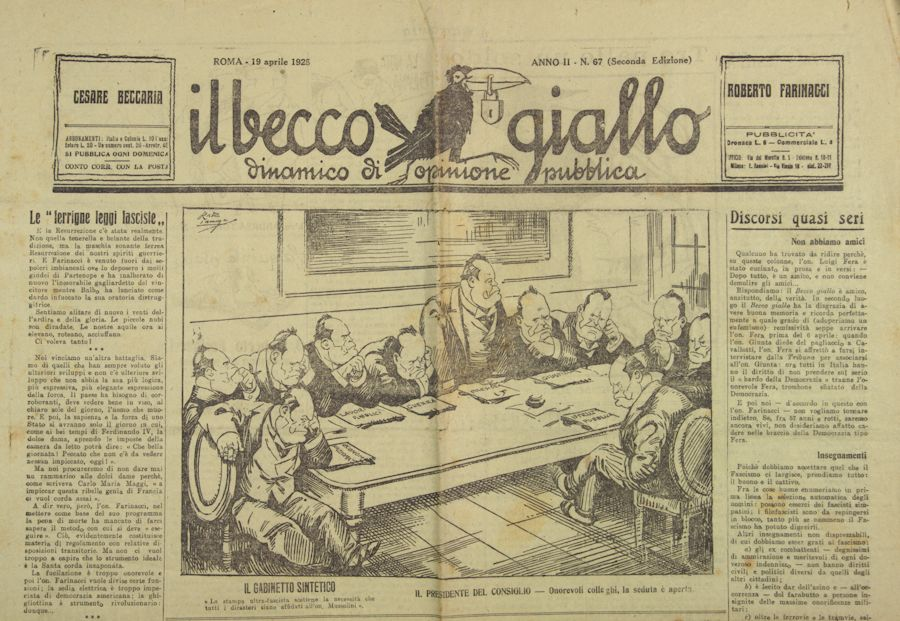
- Editor-in-chief: Alberto Cianca
- Categories: Satirical magazine
- Frequency: Weekly
- Founder: Alberto Giannini
- First issue: 13 January 1924
- Final issue: 1926
- Country: Italy
- Based in: Rome
- Language: Italian

Il Becco Giallo (English: "The Yellow Beak") was an antifascist satirical magazine in the 1920s in Italy. The magazine existed between 1924 and 1926.

== History ==
Il Becco Giallo was founded by Alberto Giannini in 1924, and the first issue appeared on 13 January that year. The editorial column of the first issue sided clearly against fascism:

[...] appoggiamo [...] con tutte le nostre energie l’opposizione la quale, al regime fascista di dittatoriale violenza che ha invertito tutti i valori morali e col terrorismo ha asservito l'Italia ad una banda di predoni, resiste eroicamente sfidando ogni giorno le più brutali aggressioni e lotta per la libertà soppressa, per la millenaria giustizia italiana conculcata, per la riconquista delle guarentigie costituzionali, per ridare prestigio all’Italia nel mondo.

[...] we support [...] with all our energy the opposition, which heroically resists the fascist regime of dictatorial violence that has inverted all moral values and through terrorism enslaved Italy to a band of raiders, and defies every day the most brutal aggression and struggle for suppressed freedom for the trampled thousand-year old Italian justice, for the restoration of constitutional guarantees, to restore prestige to Italy in the world.

Il Becco Giallo was based in Rome. The editor-in-chief of the magazine which was published on a weekly basis was Alberto Cianca. Contributors included Gabriele Galantara, founder and editor of L'Asino, and Stefano Siglienti. Luigi Pirandello, for his devotion to Benito Mussolini, was one of Il Becco Giallo's satirical targets, and used to be called P.Randello (randello in Italian means 'club (weapon)'). In 1926 the fascist regime forced Giannini to close it and emigrate to France. Editor-in-chief Alberto Cianca also fled to Paris where he managed to continue to publish Il Becco Giallo.

On 1 August 1927 the new clandestine series of the magazine appeared in Paris, with co-editor Alberto Cianca, thanks to financial subsidies collected in Concentrazione Antifascista Italiana (Italian Anti-Fascist Concentration) circles through the intervention of Filippo Turati and the Italo-Argentine industrialist Torquato Di Tella, and later also with the contribution of the Giustizia e Libertà movement. The publications of the clandestine journal continued until August 1931 (77 issues in all), when the journal closed due to disagreements that arose between Carlo Rosselli, who guaranteed funding, and Giannini, who edited the journal.

In the same period, two magazines emerged in Italy that were characterized for developing an innovative surreal humour, the Bertoldo and the Marc'Aurelio; the authors of these magazines were reactionaries that avoided political satire to comply with the regime.

== See also ==
- List of magazines in Italy
