= Carol Lunetta Cianca =

Sicilian-born writer (1898–2002)

Carol Lunetta Cianca (born 1898 in Polizzi Generosa – 11 April 2002) was a Sicilian-born American who worked in England and Italy for Allied intelligence forces during World War II. At 100 years of age she published an acclaimed autobiography that described the back story of her undercover experiences on behalf of the United States during the War.

== Biography ==
Lunetta Cianca was born in Sicily, Italy, and moved with her family to the United States in 1910. Her brother Filippo had left Italy years earlier for Bayonne, New Jersey. Her family joined him and she attended high school there. In 1916, following difficult relations with her father, she moved to New York City and found work that allowed her to use her Italian language skills: first at the Italian Military Mission and then at the Italian High Commission before settling in at the antifascist Mazzini Society, directed by journalist Alberto Tarchiani. While working at the Society, she became acquainted with many distinguished Italians working toward the reunification of their home country and the birth of an independent Italy. One of these figures was the journalist Alberto Cianca (1884–1966).

In December 1942, the Mazzini Society closed and Lunetta Cianca was hired by the United States Office of War Information and sent on a mission to London where she remained for eleven months and endured the German bombing of London, called "The Blitz." With the liberation of Rome by Allied forces on June 24, 1944, she was immediately transferred there and met Alberto Cianca again.

According to Turibio, during Lunetta Cianca's employment with the U.S. government, she was drawn into an undercover environment.

"In fact, the writer, exercising functions of central importance and responsibility in the service of the US Intelligence (Mazzini Society, Office of War Information and Psychological Warfare Board), is called upon to carry out tasks that, in addition to allowing her access to restricted circles of power, grant her the privilege of an extraordinary knowledge of the facts, thus enabling her to shed new light on facts and people and to report, albeit with the careful discretion of an undercover military agent, on new scenarios that are populated by unsuspected figures, whose contribution proves essential in determining the success of the war... The autobiographical story in question... takes on a documentary value. (page 553).

She married Alberto Cianca in 1944 after a "lightning engagement." On two occasions, she returned to America, once on leave and another time to visit relatives there. She and her husband made their permanent home in Rome and she remained there until her return to Sicily in 1985. A widow since 1966, she spent her summers in Polizzi and winters in Termini Imerese.

In 1999, at the age of 100, Lunetta Cianca authored: Un'anima in viaggio (A Soul on a Journey), her autobiography that received acclaim from literary critics and was the object of articles that appeared in leading national newspapers such as (Il Messaggero, Il Corriere della Sera, La Sicilia, Il Giornale di Sicilia) and periodicals (Donna Moderna, IO Donna, Oggi, Famiglia Cristiana, Bella, Il Venerdì di Repubblica). One reviewer mentioned "the undoubtedly fascinating and singular figure of Mrs. Cianca, but wanted to dwell on the intrinsic qualities of the work that constitutes, according to many, a true narrative jewel also endowed with exceptional historical value."

She died at 103 in Sicily on 11 April 2002.
