= Bellanca (surname) =

Bellanca is a surname. Notable people with the surname include:

- August Bellanca (1880–1969), American labor activist
- Dorothy Jacobs Bellanca (1894–1946), American labor activist, wife of August
- Giuseppe Mario Bellanca (1886–1960), Italian-American airplane designer and builder
