= Amelia Rosselli =

Italian poet

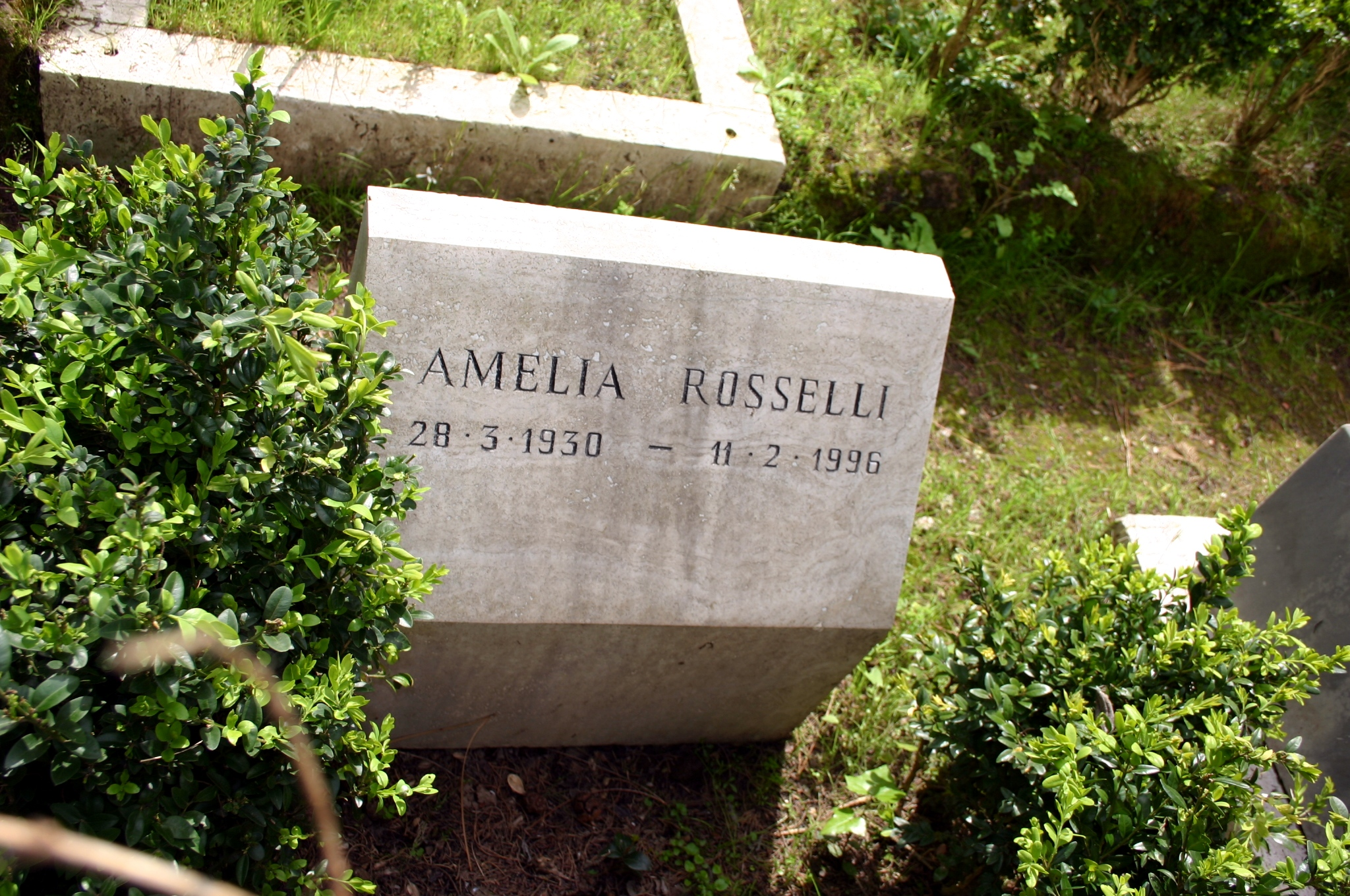
- Gravestone, in Rome.
- Born: 28 March 1930; Paris, France
- Died: 11 February 1996 (aged 65); Rome, Italy
- Occupation: Poet
- Writing career
- Language: Italian, English
- Genre: Poetry

Amelia Rosselli (28 March 1930 – 11 February 1996) was an Italian poet, musician, and musicologist close to John Cage and Karlheinz Stockhausen.

== Early life ==
Rosselli was the daughter of Marion Catherine Cave, an English political activist, and Carlo Rosselli, a hero of the Italian anti-Fascist Resistance—founder, with his brother Nello, of the liberal socialist movement Justice and Liberty. He and his brother were assassinated by La Cagoule, secret services of the Fascist regime, while the extended family was living in exile in France in 1937. The family then moved between England and the United States, where Rosselli was educated. She continued to speak Italian with her grandmother, Amelia Pincherle Rosselli, a Venetian Jewish feminist, playwright, and translator from a family prominent in the Italian Risorgimento, the movement for independence. Rosselli returned to Italy in 1949, eventually settling in Rome. She committed suicide in 1996 by jumping from her fifth floor apartment near Rome's Piazza Navona.

== Intellectual interests ==
Rosselli spent her life studying music composition and ethnomusicology and by taking part in the cultural life of postwar Italy, mostly as a poet and literary translator. Her experimental literature includes verse and poetic prose in English and French, as well as Italian. Her original poetic output is deeply influenced by the French Surrealism tradition.

== Translations ==
Rosselli has been translated into English by Lucia Re, Jennifer Scappettone, Gian Maria Annovi, Diana Thow, Deborah Woodard, Paul Vangelisti, and Cristina Viti.

== Poetry collections in English ==
- Sleep, with an introduction by Barry Schwabsky, published as part of the NYRB Poets series of the New York Review Books, 2023.
- Sonno - Sleep (1953-1966), bilingual edition, translated into Italian by Antonio Porta. Roma: Rossi & Spera, 1989.
- Sleep: Poesie in Inglese, bilingual edition, translated into Italian by Emmanuela Tandello. Milano: Garzanti, 1992
- October Elizabethans, bilingual edition, edited and translated into Italian by Emmanuela Tandello. Genova: San Marco dei Giustiniani, 2015 (posthumous)

== Poetry collections in Italian ==
- Variazioni belliche. Milano: Garzanti, 1964 (War Variations, translated by Lucia Re and Paul Vangelisti. Green Integer, 2003)
- Serie ospedaliera. Milano: Il Saggiatore, 1969 (Hospital Series, translated by Deborah Woodard, Roberta Antognini, Giuseppe Leporace. New Directions, 2015)
- Documento (1966-1973). Milano: Garzanti, 1976
- Primi scritti 1952-1963. Milano: Guanda, 1980
- Impromptu. Genova: Edizioni San Marco dei Giustiniani, 1981 (Impromptu. A Trilingual Edition, translated by Gian Maria Annovi, Diana Thow, Jean-Charles Vegliante. Guernica, 2015)
- Appunti sparsi e persi, 1966-1977: Poesie. Reggio Emilia: Aelia Laelia, 1983
- La libellula. Milano: SE, 1985
- Antologia poetica. Milano: Garzanti, 1987
- Le poesie. Milano: Garzanti, 1997
- Appunti sparsi e persi: 1966-1977. Roma: Empiria, 1997 (posthumous)
- La furia dei venti contrari. Variazioni: Con testi inediti e dispersi dell'autrice, Firenze, Le lettere, 2007 (posthumous)
- La libellula e altri scritti, Milano, SE, 2010 (posthumous) (The Dragonfly: A Selection of Poems: 1953-1981, translated by Giuseppe Leporace & Deborah Woodard. Chelsea Editions, 2010)
- L'opera poetica, edited by Stefano Giovannuzzi. Milano: "I Meridiani" Mondadori, 2012 (posthumous)

== Selected poetry originally written in English or Italian ==
- Locomotrix: Selected Poetry and Prose of Amelia Rosselli, edited and translated by Jennifer Scappettone. Chicago: University of Chicago Press, 2012) (posthumous)

== Creative prose ==
- Prime prose italiane (1954)
- Nota (1967–1968)
- Diario ottuso. 1954-1968. Roma: IBN, 1990 (Obtuse Diary, translated by Deborah Woodard, Roberta Antognini, Dario De Pasquale. Entre Ríos Books, 2018)

== Critical writings ==
- Una scrittura plurale: Saggi e interventi critici, edited by Francesca Caputo. Novara: Interlinea, 2004 (posthumous)
