= Her Soul =

Her Soul (Anima in Italian) is the first play by Jewish-Italian writer and feminist Amelia Pincherle Rosselli (1870-1954), the grandmother of Italian modernist poet Amelia Rosselli (1930-1966).

Rosselli entered the three-act play in the Concorso drammatico dell'Esposizione nazionale, a national competition being offered by the Italian state for first theatrical works. Anima, chosen the winner out of more than sixty entries, premiered in Turin on October 29, 1898 at the Teatro Gerbino, under the direction of Alfredo de Sanctis (1866-1954), and was performed by the company of actors, Teatro d'Arte, with Clara Della Guardia (1865-1937) as the protagonist. The play then toured Italy and abroad to critical acclaim and was published in 1901.

Anima was written in answer to Giuseppe Giacosa's drama, The Rights of the Soul (1894), a play in one act, influenced by Ibsen's, A Doll's House (1879). Rosselli, who had explored a similar theme, the dichotomy between the purity of the body and that of the soul, in a short story written during the early years of her marriage, expanded the story into a three-act drama directly in response to Giacosa's work.

In his play, Giacosa grants his heroine the right to nurture a Platonic love for a man who is not her husband. Rosselli, on the other hand, not only condemns this type of love but also ridicules it. Her play is an outright condemnation of how young men at the turn-of-the-century would go about choosing their wives. After taking sexual advantage of women who were not considered the marrying type, they would then choose a young inexperienced girl from a good family, with the hope of molding her or simply for her dowry. But some girls, kept too strictly at home and only superficially educated, made life difficult for their husbands with their constant flirtation, as does Graziana in Anima. Olga, Rosselli's protagonist, who had been raped at fifteen years of age, represents not only the more intelligent and mature woman forced to hide her suffering, but also the professional woman, a painter, and thus considered by her contemporaries as unsuitable for the role of a traditional wife.

For these reasons, Anima is an original and daring play for its time and has not lost its relevancy, as the problems it presents remain valid today: the trauma of rape and the concept that a successful marriage be based on mutual respect, common interests and a spiritual understanding of each other's "soul". (See "Introduction" by Natalia Costa-Zalessow to Her Soul. Translated into English by Natalia Costa-Zalessow with the collaboration of Joan E. Borrelli, in Modern Drama by Women 1880s-1930s: An International Anthology, edited by Katherine E. Kelly, pp. 44-79.)

In 1996, upon publication of the English translation, Acts I and II of Her Soul were read on stage on February 28 and March 1 of that year by students of the Drama Department of Texas A&M University.

Her Soul (Anima) is promoted by Expand the Canon who have offered the text of the play online and have facilitated its staging. Moreover, they have declared the play a "classic" deserving a "spot in the canon" and have included Olga's monologue from Act I Scene 8, along with three other selections, in their first publication, edited by Emily Lyon, 110 Standout Classic Monologues for Any Actor, 1600-1990: from Overlooked Plays by Historic Women.

A shortened version of Her Soul, directed by Becca Westbrook, was performed on February 9 and 10, 2025, by students of the Shakespeare & Performance MLitt Program at Mary Baldwin University.

With 18 performances from July 24 to August 30, 2025, Anima (Her Soul) was fully staged for the Island Shakespeare Festival on Whidbey Island in Langley, Washington, and directed by Emily Lyon, Artistic Director of Expand the Canon, with Olena Hodges, Executive Artistic Director of Island Shakespeare Festival, as the protagonist.

A reading of the entire play in English can be accessed through YouTube: Marialana Ardolino Anima (Her Soul).

== Publication history ==
Anima. Dramma in tre atti. Turin, S. Lattes & Co., 1901.

Her Soul (Anima): A Drama in Three Acts. Translated into English by Natalia Costa-Zalessow with the collaboration of Joan E. Borrelli, in Modern Drama by Women 1880s-1930s: An International Anthology, edited by Katherine E. Kelly. London, Routledge, 1996, pp. 44-79.

Anima. Dramma in tre atti. Introduced and edited by Natalia Costa-Zalessow (in Italian). Rome, Salerno Editrice, 1997.
