= Stefano Siglienti =

Italian banker and politician (1898–1971)

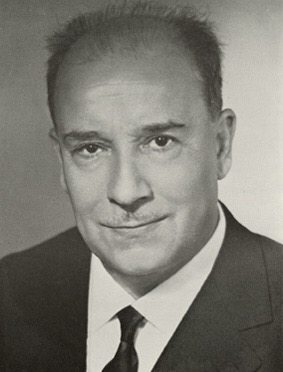

Minister of Finance
- In office June 1944 – December 1944
- Prime Minister: Ivanoe Bonomi
- Preceded by: Quinto Quintieri

Personal details
- Born: 17 January 1898 Sassari, Kingdom of Italy
- Died: 5 April 1971 (aged 73) Rome, Italy
- Party: Action Party
- Spouse: Ines Berlinguer
- Children: 4
- Parents: Alberto Siglienti (father); Francesca Conti (mother)

Stefano Siglienti (1898 – 1971) was an Italian banker and politician who served as the minister of finance from 18 June until 12 December 1944. He held several banking posts until his death.

== Early life and education ==
Hailed from an intellectual bourgeois family, Siglienti was born in Sassari on 17 January 1898 to Alberto Siglienti, a lawyer, and Francesca Conti. He received a law degree in 1921.

== Career and activities ==
Following graduation from high school, Siglienti began to work at a local bank in Sassari. He took part in World War I as a second lieutenant and was decorated by the King of Italy in July 1918 due to his activities in the war. He was one of the founders of the Action Party in Sardinia. In 1923, he began to work at the Sardinian Land Bank of which he became deputy director general in 1945. In 1925, he moved to Rome and contributed to the publications, including Il Mondo and Il Becco Giallo. In 1929, he was involved in the formation of Giustizia e Libertà (GL), an anti-fascist resistance movement, together with Riccardo Bauer, Ugo La Malfa, and Raffaele Mattioli.

On 19 November 1943, Siglienti was arrested by the Schutzstaffel and was kept in the Regina Coeli prison. He managed to escape from the prison through the assistance of his wife, Ines, who had also been involved in the clandestine struggle against Fascist Italy. Therefore, Siglienti was saved from being one of the victims of the Ardeatine massacre that would take place a few days later on 24 March 1944. He was appointed minister of finance in June 1944 to the cabinet led by Ivanoe Bonomi and was in office until December 1944.

From 1 March to 10 December 1945, Siglienti worked as the commissioner of the Banca IMI and then became its president. That same year, he was also named a member of the National Council. In addition, he was appointed president of the Italian Banking Association, in September 1945 a position that he held until 1971.

== Personal life and death ==
Siglienti married Ines Berlinguer, sister of politician Mario Berlinguer, in September 1924. They had a son and three daughters: Sergio (1926–2020), Lina, Laura, and Francesca. Siglienti died in Rome on 5 April 1971.
