= Gaetano Salvemini =

Italian historian and politician (1873–1957)

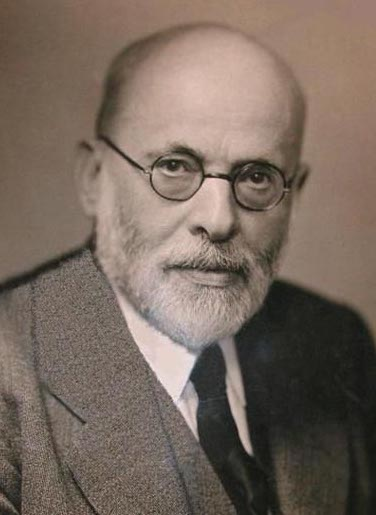

Member of the Chamber of Deputies
- In office 1 December 1919 – 7 April 1921
- Constituency: Bari

Personal details
- Born: 8 September 1873 Molfetta, Italy
- Died: 6 September 1957 (aged 83) Sorrento, Italy
- Party: PSI
- Profession: Historian, writer

Gaetano Salvemini (Italian pronunciation: [ɡaeˈtaːno salˈvɛːmini]; 8 September 1873 – 6 September 1957) was an Italian socialist and anti-fascist politician, historian, and writer. Born into a family of modest means, he became a historian of note whose work drew attention in Italy and abroad, particularly in the United States, after he was forced into exile by Benito Mussolini's Italian fascist regime.

Initially engaging with the Italian Socialist Party, Salvemini later adhered to an independent humanitarian socialism and maintained a commitment to radical political and social reform throughout his life. Salvemini offered significant leadership to political refugees in the United States. His prolific writings shaped the attitudes of American policymakers during and after the Second World War. His transatlantic exile experience endowed him with new insights and a fresh perspective to explain the rise of fascism and shaped the memory of the war and political life in Italy after 1945.

In post-war Italy, Salvemini advocated a third way between the Italian Communist Party and Christian Democracy.

== Early life and career ==
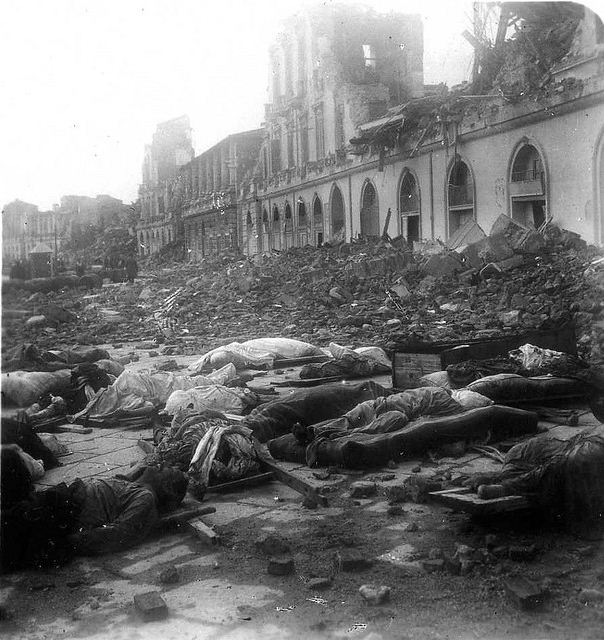
Victims' bodies in Messina after the 1908 earthquake, in which Salvemini lost his wife, five children, and his sister

Salvemini was born in the town of Molfetta, Apulia, in the poor south of the Kingdom of Italy, in an extended family of farmers and fishermen of modest means. His father, Ilarione Salvemini, was a carabiniere and part-time teacher. He had been a radical republican who had fought as a Redshirt following Giuseppe Garibaldi in his fight for Italian unification. His mother, Emanuela Salvemini (née Turtur), was a socialist. His parents' political leanings, as well as the poverty of the region, shaped his own political and social ideals throughout his life.

Salvemini was admitted at the University of Florence, where he met students of northern Italy and engaged with young socialists who introduced him to Marxism, the ideas of philosopher and revolutionary Carlo Cattaneo, and the Italian socialist journal Critica Sociale edited by Italy's foremost Marxist Filippo Turati. After completing his studies in Florence in 1894, his historical studies on medieval Florence, the French Revolution, and Giuseppe Mazzini established him as an historian of note. In 1897, he married Maria Minervini, the daughter of an engineer from Apulia, whom he had met while studying in Florence and with whom he would have five children: Filippo, Leonida, Corrado, Ugo and Elena.

In 1901, after years of teaching in secondary schools, Salvemini was appointed as Professor of Medieval and Modern History at the University of Messina. While in Messina, his wife, five children, and his sister perished before his eyes in the devastating 1908 Messina earthquake, while hiding under an architrave of a window; an experience that shaped his life. He wrote: "I am a miserable wretch, without home or hearth, who has seen the happiness of eleven years destroyed in two minutes."

== Engaging with socialism ==
Salvemini became increasingly concerned with Italian politics and adhered to the Italian Socialist Party (Italian: Partito Socialista Italiano, PSI). As a member of the PSI, Salvemini fought for universal suffrage and the moral and economic rebirth of Italy's Mezzogiorno (Southern Italy) and against corruption in politics. As a meridionalist, he criticised the PSI for its indifference to the problems of Southern Italy. He would eventually abandon the PSI to adhere to an independent humanitarian socialism but maintained a commitment to radical reform throughout his life.

In 1910, he published an article in the socialist newspaper Avanti!, "The Minister of the Underworld" ("Il ministro della malavita"), in which he attacked the power system and political machine of the liberal prime minister Giovanni Giolitti, who dominated Italian political life in the early 20th century. Salvemini reproached Giolitti for exploiting the backwardness of Southern Italy for short-term political goals by appeasing the landlords while engaging with corrupt political go-betweens with ties to the underworld. According to Salvemini, Giolitti exploited "the miserable conditions of the Mezzogiorno in order to link the mass of southern deputies to himself."

Salvemini opposed Italy's costly military campaign in Libya during Italo-Turkish War (1911–1912). He thought that the war did not meet the real needs of the country in need of far-reaching economic and social reforms, but was a dangerous collusion between unrealistic nationalism and corporate interests. In 1911, Salvemini left the PSI because of what he described as "the silence and indifference" on the war by the party. He founded the weekly political review L'Unità, which served as the voice of militant democrats in Italy for the next decade. He criticised the government's aspirations to build an Italian Empire and its designs in Africa as chauvinist foolishness.

== Intervention in World War I ==
Salvemini did favour Italy's entry in the First World War on the side of the Entente powers against the 'anachronistic' character of the German and Austro-Hungarian empires and calling for their defeat in the interests of Italy, as Austria-Hungary still occupied regions considered to be Italian. Intervention in the war was a minority position among socialists that, in the words of Battista Santhià (it), distinguished "between the imperialist war and the just national claims against the old imperialisms; they did not consider it right that some Italian provinces should remain under the dominion of a foreign state, moreover a reactionary one." Salvemini wanted to achieve a greater political, economic, and social stake in the nation by the masses, as well as national self-determination.

Within Italy's left-interventionist movement, he became one of the leaders of the democratic interventionists with Leonida Bissolati. Through the fight for democracy abroad, he believed that Italy would rediscover its own democratic roots. Consistently with his interventionist position, he joined as a volunteer in the first two years of the war. Towards the end of the war, however, he was disappointed that the rivalries between the states could not ultimately be overcome and that the individual peoples did not exert enough influence on the decisions of their governments.

Back in civilian life, he went on to teach history at the University of Pisa and in 1916 was appointed Professor of Modern History at the University of Florence. Over the years, he aligned with the economist Luigi Einaudi and gradually developed a pragmatic inquiry and inductive analysis, which he called concretismo – a combination of secular values from the Age of Enlightenment, liberalism, and socialism – in contrast to more philosophical thinkers like the liberal Benedetto Croce and the Marxist Antonio Gramsci. In 1916, he married Fernande Dauriac, the divorced wife of Julien Luchaire, an Italianist and founder of the Institut français in Florence, and an animator from 1916 to 1919 of the Revue des nations latines, on which Salvemini would also collaborate. His stepson Jean Luchaire later became the head of the French collaborationist press in Paris during the German military occupation of France during World War II.

== Resisting fascism ==
The March on Rome that led fascism to power in Italy. Salvemini joined the opposition and became an anti-fascist.

In the immediate postwar period, Salvemini was initially silent about Italian fascism. Elected on a list of ex-combatants, he served in the Chamber of Deputies as an independent radical from 1919 to 1921 during the revolutionary period of the Biennio Rosso. He supported the Fourteen Points, the internationalist programme of self-determination of United States president Woodrow Wilson that envisioned a readjustment of the frontiers of Italy along clearly-recognisable lines of nationality, in contrast to the Italian irredentist policy of the foreign minister Sidney Sonnino.

As a deputy, he soon dissented from the political line of its parliamentary group and started a lively polemic against Benito Mussolini, whom he had admired as socialist leader, to the point that Mussolini challenged him to a duel, which never took place. Nevertheless, as late as 1922, he considered the fascist movement too small to be a serious political challenge. Salvemini was more opposed to old-style politicians like Giolitti. He wrote: "A return to Giolitti would be a moral disaster for the whole country. Mussolini was able to carry out his coup.... because everybody was disgusted by the Chamber."

While in Paris, Salvemini was surprised by Mussolini's March on Rome in October 1922, which initiated the National Fascist Party take over of Italy. In 1923, he held a series of lectures on Italian foreign policy in London to the ire of the Italian fascist government and Florentine fascists. The walls of Florence were plastered with posters saying "The monkey from Molfetta should not return to Italy". Instead, Salvemini not only returned home but also resumed his lectures at the university regardless of the threat of fascist students. He joined the opposition after the murder of the socialist politician Giacomo Matteotti on 10 June 1924, when it became clear that Mussolini wanted to establish a one-party dictatorship.

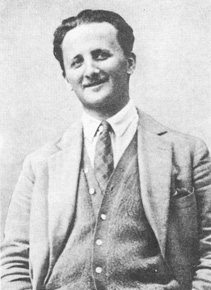
Nello Rosselli, pictured in 1925, with whom Salvemini founded the anti-fascist Giustizia e Libertà

Salvemini worked to maintain a strong network of contacts among anti-fascist intellectuals throughout Italy while much of the Italian academic world bowed to the regime. With his former students and followers Ernesto Rossi and Carlo Rosselli, he founded the first clandestine anti-fascist newspaper Non mollare (it) ("Don't Give Up") in January 1925. A half year later, he was arrested and put on trial; he was released on a technicality, although he was kept under surveillance. Threats against his life were published in the fascist press, and his lawyer was beaten to death by fascist Blackshirts. His name was on top of the list of the fascist death squads during raids on 4 October 1925 in Florence. Earlier, in August, Salvemini had fled to France. He was dismissed from the University of Florence, and his Italian citizenship was revoked in 1926.

In exile, Salvemini continued to actively organize resistance against Mussolini in France, England, and finally the United States. Salvemini and others smuggled out documents on Matteotti's murder, eventually locking them away in the archives of the London School of Economics, because they "well knew that their quest for justice for Matteotti would be unfulfilled for the foreseeable future. But they were driven by the conviction that these documents could one day prove beyond doubt that Mussolini had orchestrated Matteotti’s assassination."

In 1927, he published The Fascist Dictatorship in Italy, a lucid and groundbreaking study of the rise of fascism and Mussolini. In Paris, he was involved with the founding of Concentrazione antifascista in 1927 and Giustizia e Libertà with Carlo and Nello Rosselli in 1929. Through those organizations, Italian exiles were helping the anti-fascists in Italy and spreading clandestine newspapers. The movement intended to be a third alternative between fascism and Soviet Communism, pursuing a free democratic republic based on social justice.

== In the United States ==
Salvemini first toured the United States in January 1927 and lectured with a clear anti-fascist agenda. His lectures were disturbed by fascist foes. His forced exile nevertheless gave him a "sense of freedom, of spiritual independence". Rather than exile or refugee, he preferred the term fuoruscito, an originally-contemptuous label employed by fascists that was adopted as a symbol of honour by political exiles from Italy, "a man who has chosen to leave his country to continue a resistance which had become impossible at home". He published The Fascist Dictatorship in Italy (1927), contradicting the widely held belief that Mussolini had saved Italy from Bolshevism.

In 1934, Salvemini accepted a position created especially for him, to teach Italian civilization at Harvard University, where he would remain until 1948. Together with Roberto Bolaffi, he founded a North American chapter of Giustizia e Libertà. He wrote articles in important journals like Foreign Affairs and travelled around the country to warn American public opinion against the dangers of fascism. Alarmed by the outbreak of the Second World War after Adolf Hitler's invasion of Poland in September 1939, he and other Italian exiles founded the anti-fascist Mazzini Society in Northampton, Massachusetts. Salvemini joined the Italian Emergency Rescue Committee, which raised money for Italian political refugees and worked to convince American authorities to admit them.

Salvemini obtained United States citizenship in 1940 in the belief that he would have greater opportunity to influence American policies toward Italy. In fact, government agencies like the State Department and the Federal Bureau of Investigation solicited his advice on fascism and Italian matters in general. Notable writings of the American years include Under the Axe of Fascism (1936). As an intellectual, Salvemini left an undeniable mark on the study of Italian history at Harvard and other universities by changing their original focus on language, art, and literature to a critical and systematic study into modern Italy.

The increasing prominence of Max Ascoli, Carlo Sforza, and Alberto Tarchiani in the Mazzini Society consequently led to the progressive distancing of Salvemini from active decision making. Salvemini's fear was that Franklin D. Roosevelt would give Winston Churchill and his conservative agenda a free hand in postwar Italy that would benefit the monarchy and those who had collaborated with Mussolini. After Mussolini's fall in July 1943, Salvemini became increasingly concerned that the Allies of World War II and Italian moderates favoured a conservative restoration in Italy. To provide an alternative, together with Harvard professor Giorgio La Piana, Salvemini authored What to Do With Italy?, in which they sketched a plan for the postwar reconstruction of Italy with a republican and social-democratic programme. Salvemini was also a familiar figure in the younger years of Arthur Schlesinger Jr., editor of the campaign speeches for peace strategy then known as The New Frontier for John F. Kennedy.

== Back in Italy ==
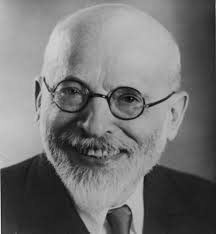
Salvemini later in his life

Although a United States citizen, Salvemini returned to Italy in 1948 and was reinstated to his old post as Professor of Modern History at the University of Florence. After twenty years of exile, he started his first speech at his old university with "As we were saying in the last lecture". As a left-leaning republican, he was disappointed with the victory of Christian Democracy in the 1948 Italian general election and the influence of the Catholic Church in the country. Salvemini hoped that the Action Party, a post-war political party that emerged from Giustizia e Libertà, could provide a third force, a socialist-republican coalition uniting reformist socialists and genuine democrats as an alternative for the Italian Communist Party and Christian Democracy. His hopes for a new Italy declined with the restoration of old attitudes and institutions with the start of the Cold War.

In 1953, Salvemini's last major historic study, Prelude to World War II, was published about the Second Italo-Ethiopian War (1935–1937). As a historian, he wrote mainly about recent and contemporary history but was also noted for his studies of the Italian medieval commune. His The French Revolution: 1788–1792 is an outstanding explanation of the social, political, and philosophical currents and monarchical incompetence that led to that cataclysm.

== Death and legacy ==
Salvemini spent the last period of his life in Sorrento, in the Campania southern Italian region, and never ceased to denounce the ancient Italian evils: inefficiency, scandals, and the lengthy justicial procedures that continued to favour the powerful. He lamented the public schools, which he considered not to be forming a real critical conscience. After a long illness, he died on 6 September 1957 at the age of 83.

Salvemini was among the first and most effective opponents of fascism. According to his biographer Charles L. Killinger, Salvemini embodied a political culture such that "the Fascists were anti-Salvemini before he became anti-Fascist, and their efforts to silence him made his name synonymous with early Italian resistance to the new regime." Although a prolific historian, he was not the kind of person to separate scholarship from political activity. Throughout his exile, he actively organized resistance to Mussolini, assisting others in escaping Italy, and he played an important role in spurring both elite and public opinion in America against the fascist regime.

Giolitti's biographer Alexander De Grand describes his subject's foe as a "major historian, driven by an austere moralism" and as a "difficult man who attracted deep attachments and bitter enmity", who "constantly sought to turn his ideas into practical policy, yet he was a mediocre – no, terrible – politician", quoting Salvemini's fellow exile Max Ascoli, who described him "as the greatest enemy of politics of all the men I have known". Nevertheless, Salvemini was an imperative force who left a permanent mark on Italian politics and historiography. As a party activist, political commentator, and public officeholder, he championed social and political reform, and his name is tantamount to early Italian resistance to Fascist Italy. Salvemini said several times that he always tried to live by the principle, "Do what you have to do, come what may" (in Italian: "Fa' quello che devi, avvenga quello che può").
