= Francesco Fausto Nitti =

Italian journalist (1899–1974)

- Born: 2 September 1899; Pisa, Kingdom of Italy
- Died: 28 May 1974 (aged 74); Rome, Italy
- Education: Sapienza University of Rome
- Era: 19th century
- Organization: Giustizia e Libertà
- Notable work: Escape
- Political party: Unified Socialist Party
- Movement: Anti-fascism
- Parents: Vincenzo (father); Paola Ciari (mother)
- Relatives: Francesco Saverio Nitti
- Awards: War Merit Cross; Resistance Medal

Francesco Fausto Nitti (born 2 September 1899 in Pisa – died 28 May 1974, in Rome) was an Italian journalist and fighter against fascism. His father Vincenzo (1871–1957) was an evangelical preacher of the Italian Methodist Church, his mother was Paola Ciari (1870–1932).

== Biography ==
When Francesco Fausto Nitti was seventeen, he fought in the First World War. In 1924, after the death of Giacomo Matteotti (a socialist deputy killed by the will of Benito Mussolini), Nitti became an active anti-fascist propagandist, and as a result, in December 1926 he was arrested and confined in Lipari. Along with two other political prisoners, Carlo Rosselli and Emilio Lussu, he managed to escape in July 1929 and take refuge in France, where they founded Giustizia e Libertà, a resistance movement opposing fascism.

Nitti went to Spain in March 1937 and served the Republican faction as a major during the Civil War. After the defeat of his side, he came back to France where he was held in a concentration camp, later being sent on the Nazi Ghost Train to be deported to Germany; Nitti (as well as one hundred of the seven hundred prisoners) fled when the train was near the frontier, after removing some planks from the floor of his carriage.

He returned to France and joined the maquis, helping the French Resistance. After rejoining his family at Tolosa, in 1946 he eventually returned to Italy. Taking a variety of roles in anti-fascist associations, he was director of the ANPI publication Patria Indipendente and became a commune councilman in Rome.

Nitti died in Rome on 28 May 1974.

== Sources ==
- Francesco Fausto Nitti, Escape: The personal narrative of a political prisoner who was rescued from Lipari, the fascist "Devil's Island". Putnam (1930) ASIN: B0006AKUZY
- Francesco Fausto Nitti, Nitti F. F., Le nostre prigioni e la nostra evasione, Edizioni Scientifiche Italiane, Napoli, 1946.
- Francesco Fausto Nitti, Neofascismo allo specchio, ANPPIA, Roma,1968.
- Francesco Fausto Nitti, Chevaux 8 – Hommes 70, Éditions Chantal, Toulouse, 1944. The escape from the train deporting him to Germany.
- Francesco Fausto Nitti, Il maggiore è un rosso, Edizioni Avanti! Milano – Roma, 1953. The taking part in Spanish Civil War.
- Pietro Ramella, Francesco Fausto Nitti – L'uomo che beffò Hitler e Mussolini, Aracne editrice, Roma, 2007. Biography of F.F. Nitti.
