= Charles Nagel =

American judge (1849–1940)

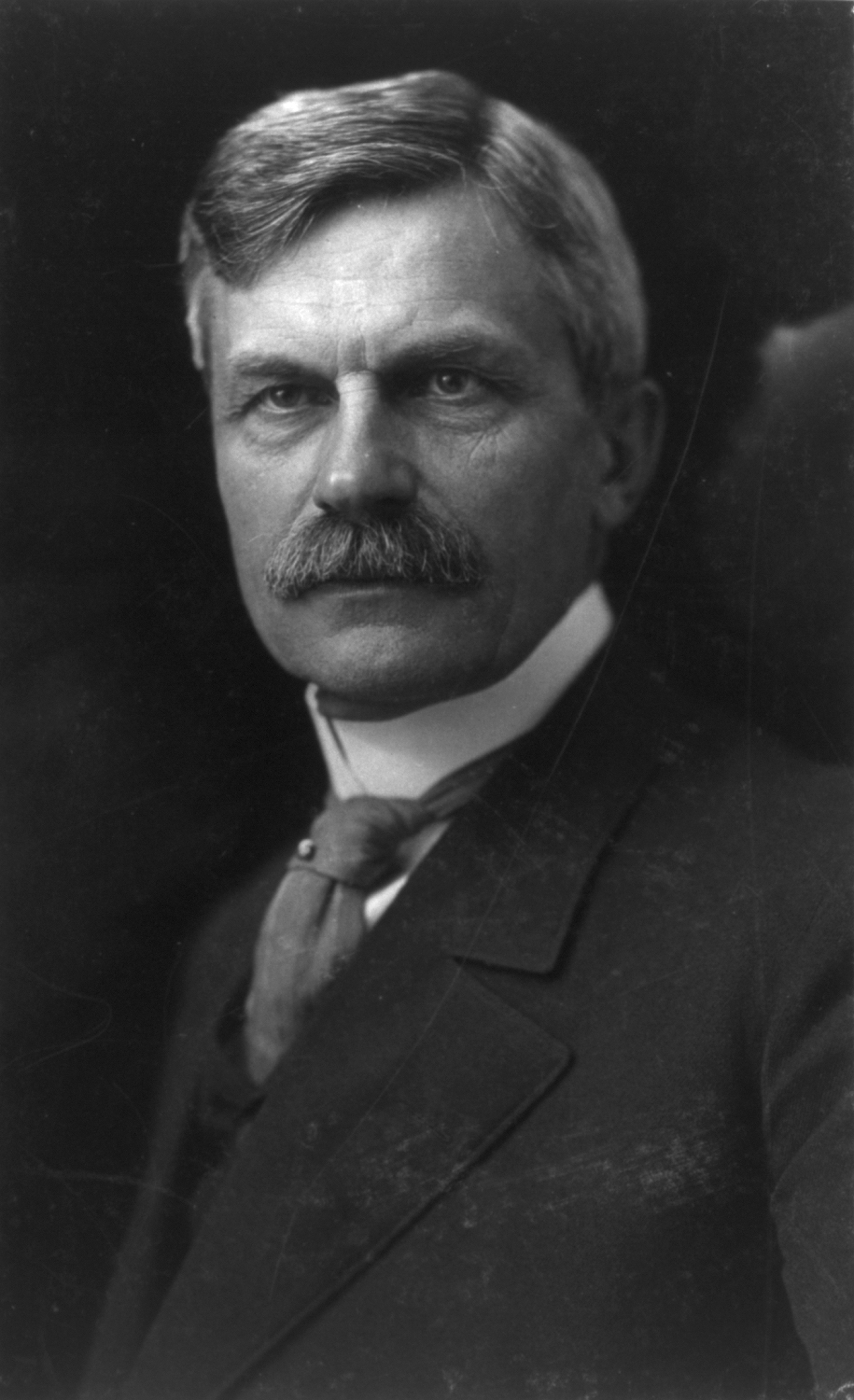

4th United States Secretary of Commerce and Labor
- In office March 6, 1909 – March 4, 1913
- President: William Howard Taft
- Preceded by: Oscar Straus
- Succeeded by: William Redfield (Commerce); William Wilson (Labor)

Personal details
- Born: August 9, 1849 Colorado County, Texas, U.S.
- Died: January 5, 1940 (aged 90) St. Louis, Missouri, U.S.
- Party: Republican
- Spouses: Fannie Brandeis (m. 1876; died 1889) Anne Shepley (m. 1895)
- Children: Charles Nagel, Jr.
- Relatives: Louis Brandeis (brother-in-law)
- Education: Washington University (LLB); University of Berlin

Charles Nagel (August 9, 1849 – January 5, 1940) was a United States politician and lawyer from St. Louis, Missouri. He was Secretary of Commerce and Labor during President William Howard Taft's administration (1909–1913) and was one of the key founders of the United States Chamber of Commerce.

== Life and career ==
Nagel was born on August 9, 1849, in Colorado County, Texas, the son of Friedericke (Litzmann) and Hermann Nagel. Nagel moved to a boarding school in St. Louis, Missouri, for high school and stayed to study law at Washington University School of Law. He graduated with his law degree in 1872. Nagel furthered his education by traveling to Europe and learning political economy at the University of Berlin.

Returning to St. Louis in 1873, Nagel joined the state bar and began to practice law. He was a member of the firm Finkelnburg, Nagel and Kirby, and later of Nagel and Kirby. His first foray into politics came when he won election to the Missouri House of Representatives in 1881, where he served until 1883. He was president of the St. Louis city council from 1893 to 1897. He also taught at St. Louis Law School (1885–1909) and was a member of the Republican National Committee (1908–1912).

Nagel was a corporate attorney for Adolphus Busch when President William Howard Taft chose him, in 1909, as Secretary of Commerce and Labor, a position he held until the end of the Taft administration in 1913. He was the last person to serve in the post before it was separated to two cabinet positions, Secretary of Commerce and Secretary of Labor. While heading the Department of Commerce and Labor, Nagel made it more accessible to the needs of businessmen while also expanding the Bureau of Immigration and Naturalization.

Nagel was also a founder of the United States Chamber of Commerce. Following his time in the cabinet, Nagel returned to the practice of law, arguing before the Supreme Court three times before his death. He died in St. Louis, Missouri on January 5, 1940, and was interred there in Bellefontaine Cemetery.

== Family ==
Nagel was married twice: first, in 1876, to Fannie Brandeis, the sister of Louis Dembitz Brandeis, later a Supreme Court justice. She died in 1889 and he married Anne Shepley in 1895. He had six children, including Charles Nagel, Jr., an architect and curator.

== Sources ==
- Charles Nagel at The Political Graveyard
- Rines, George Edwin, ed. (1920). "Nagel, Charles" . Encyclopedia Americana.
- Ragan, Cooper K. "Nagel, Charles". Handbook of Texas Online.

Political offices
Preceded by Oscar Straus	United States Secretary of Commerce and Labor; 1909–1913	Succeeded by William Redfield as United States Secretary of Commerce
Preceded by Oscar Straus	United States Secretary of Commerce and Labor; 1909–1913	Succeeded by William Wilson as United States Secretary of Labor
