= Quarto Stato =

Italian political review

Quarto Stato (Italian: Fourth State) is an Italian political review (1946–1950), closely associated with the Partito Socialista Italiano, the Italian Socialist Party.

== History and profile ==
Quarto Stato was first published in Milan by Carlo Rosselli and Pietro Nenni on 27 March 1926. They also edited the magazine, which was close to the reformist Partito Socialista Unitario of Filippo Turati, Giacomo Matteotti and Claudio Treves, which had split from the PSI. The magazine was banned on 30 October 1926 after only a few months by the Fascist government, and its editors were imprisoned.

== See also ==
- Italian Socialist Party
- List of magazines in Italy
