= Giustizia e Libertà (magazine) =

Italian political magazine (1934–1940)

- Editor: Alberto Cianca
- Former editors: Carlo Rosselli
- Categories: Political magazine
- Frequency: Weekly
- Founder: Giustizia e Libertà
- Founded: 1934
- First issue: 18 May 1934
- Final issue: 20 May 1940
- Country: France
- Based in: Paris
- Language: Italian; French
- OCLC: 612434015

Giustizia e Libertà (Italian: Justice and Freedom), also known as Quaderni di Giustizia e Libertà, was an Italian anti-Fascist publication that was founded by the members of an anti-Fascist movement with the same name established in Paris. The magazine existed between May 1934 and May 1940. Its subtitle was Movimento unitario per l’autonomia operaia, la repubblica socialista, un nuovo umanesimo.

== History and profile ==
Giustizia e Libertà was started as a weekly publication in Paris by the Italian exiles who left Italy due to oppressions of the Fascist government. The first issue was published on 18 May 1934. Its goal was to provide a platform to discuss the problems of the Italian revolution. It covered articles written in both Italian and French which attempted to present a synthesis of liberalism and socialism. Some issues of the magazine were distributed in Italy in secret.

One of its contributors was Nicola Chiaromonte. The editors of Giustizia e Libertà were Carlo Rosselli and Alberto Cianca. Rosselli was the editor between its start in 1934 and his assassination in 1937. Cianca succeeded Rosselli as editor of the magazine of which the last issue appeared on 20 May 1940.
