= Il Mondo (newspaper) =

Defunct daily newspaper in Italy (1922–1926)

- Type: Daily newspaper
- Editor: Alberto Cianca
- Founded: 26 January 1922
- Ceased publication: 31 October 1926
- Language: Italian
- Headquarters: Rome, Italy

Il Mondo (English: "The World") was an Italian afternoon political newspaper with headquarters in Rome. Founded in 1922, it was one of the last independent newspapers to be suppressed by the Fascist Regime in October 1926.

== History ==
The newspaper was founded by Giovanni Amendola (deputy and later minister in Luigi Facta's cabinet), Giovanni Ciraolo and Andrea Torre and its first issue was published on 26 January 1922. The funding of the newspaper came from industrialist Francesco Matarazzo (1854–1937). Hostile to Giovanni Giolitti, Il Mondo began as a newspaper of the current of Francesco Saverio Nitti within the Radical Party. When Nitti and Amendola founded, a few months later, the Italian Democratic Party, the newspaper became its official organ. The editor of Il Mondo was Alberto Cianca who held the post from the start of the paper in 1922 to its closure in 1926. One of the contributors was Stefano Siglienti who worked for the paper from 1925.

The newspaper strongly opposed the nascent Benito Mussolini regime. Mussolini at one point quipped "The democrats of Il Mondo want to know our program? It is to break the bones of the democrats of Il Mondo. And the sooner the better."

After the murder of Giacomo Matteotti on 10 June 1924, it published a memoir of the Secretary of Mussolini which was an indictment of the latter. It also published the first extracts from the Cesare Rossi Memorial (27 December 1924) and the "Manifesto of the Anti-Fascist Intellectuals" (1 May 1925).

In the midst of political struggle, Il Mondo reached a circulation of 110,000 copies. On 7 April 1926 Giovanni Amendola died from the consequences of beatings in fascist aggression.

In October 1926, the failed attempt on Mussolini in Bologna gave the regime a pretext to suppress the newspaper. Its main lender, the family Pecoraino suffered the confiscation of all movable and immovable property. The last issue was published on 31 October 1926.

== See also ==
- List of newspapers in Italy

== Bibliography ==
- Giornalismo italiano. Volume Secondo (1901-1939). Mondadori, 2009. Collana «I Meridiani».
