= Dorothy Jacobs Bellanca =

American labor activist

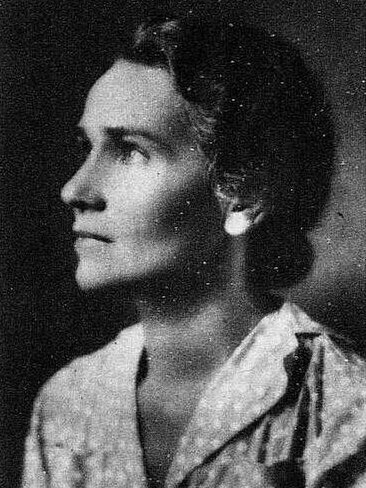
Bellanca c. 1938

Dorothy Jacobs Bellanca (August 10, 1894 – August 16, 1946) was an American labor activist who particularly represented women workers in the garment industry. She moved to the United States and started her first job as a hand buttonhole sewer, and later started organizing groups of her own. She was a strong leader and this led her to being a successful full time female organizer. She was leader and an activist that worked for many different causes.

== Biography ==
Bellanca was born in Zemel, Russian Empire, as the youngest of four daughters of Harry Jacobs, a tailor, and Bernice Edith Levinson. She emigrated to the United States in 1900, and settled in Baltimore, Maryland. Her first job was as a hand buttonhole sewer for men's coats, at the age of thirteen. She earned three dollars a week for a ten-hour day. In 1909, at age 15, she organized the Baltimore buttonhole makers into Local 170 of the United Garment Workers of America.

In 1914, Bellanca led her union to the more progressive Amalgamated Clothing Workers of America (ACWA) promoting class solidarity and the organization of women. She attended the founding convention of the ACWA with four other women; became secretary of the Joint Board; and established the Education Department on October 21, 1915. She became the sole woman to serve on the board in 1916.

In 1917, she became the organization's first full-time female organizer. In that role, she regularly contributed to the ACWA’s paper, Advance, and promoted a culture that involved the union's members and their families. Jacobs strove to embed a feminist perspective into trade unionism and was dedicated to helping improve conditions for working-class women. She encouraged a cooperative relationship between the genders.

In 1918, she married August Bellanca, an Italian ACWA labor leader. In July 1924, she established a Women’s Department within the ACWA. The Department dissolved in 1926 when Bellanca learned that men resented it.

During the Great Depression, Bellanca was a vocal activist on behalf of unemployed garment workers. She was active politically on the municipal, state, and federal level. She was a member of the New York City Mayor's Commission on Unity, and served on several state commissions to end racial discrimination in the workplace. A supporter of President Franklin D. Roosevelt, she helped to organize New York State's branch of the American Labor Party. She served on the Maternal and Child Welfare Committee in 1938 when the secretary of labor, Frances Perkins, asked her. She ran for the United States Congress for Brooklyn’s Eighth Congressional District this same year, with ALP, Republican Party, City Fusion Party, Progressive Party, and Fiorello La Guardia all supporting her. She lost the vote when incumbent Donald O’Toole discredited her to the public. She joined the Women’s Policy Committee of the War Manpower Commission during World War II.

Bellanca became the first female vice president of the ACWA in 1934, and held that position until her death in 1946. She died on August 16, 1946, aged 52, of multiple myeloma.
