= Marc'Aurelio =

Italian satirical magazine

- Categories: Satirical magazine
- Frequency: Weekly
- Founder: Oberdan Catone; Vito De Bellis
- Founded: 1931
- Final issue: 1958
- Country: Italy
- Based in: Rome
- Language: Italian

Marc'Aurelio was an Italian satirical magazine, published between 1931 and 1958, and briefly resurrected in 1973.

== History and profile ==
The weekly magazine was founded in Rome by Oberdan Catone and Vito De Bellis in 1931. It was the first satirical magazine to be started in Italy following the forced closure of other satirical magazines by the Fascist regime, particularly Il Becco Giallo, of which it inheredit many collaborators. It immediately distinguished itself for its original humour, often abstract and surreal. Initially polemic and courageous, after several judicial seizures it gradually ignored political themes and focusing in a humour which was an end in itself, eventually getting a large success and selling over 300,000 copies a week.

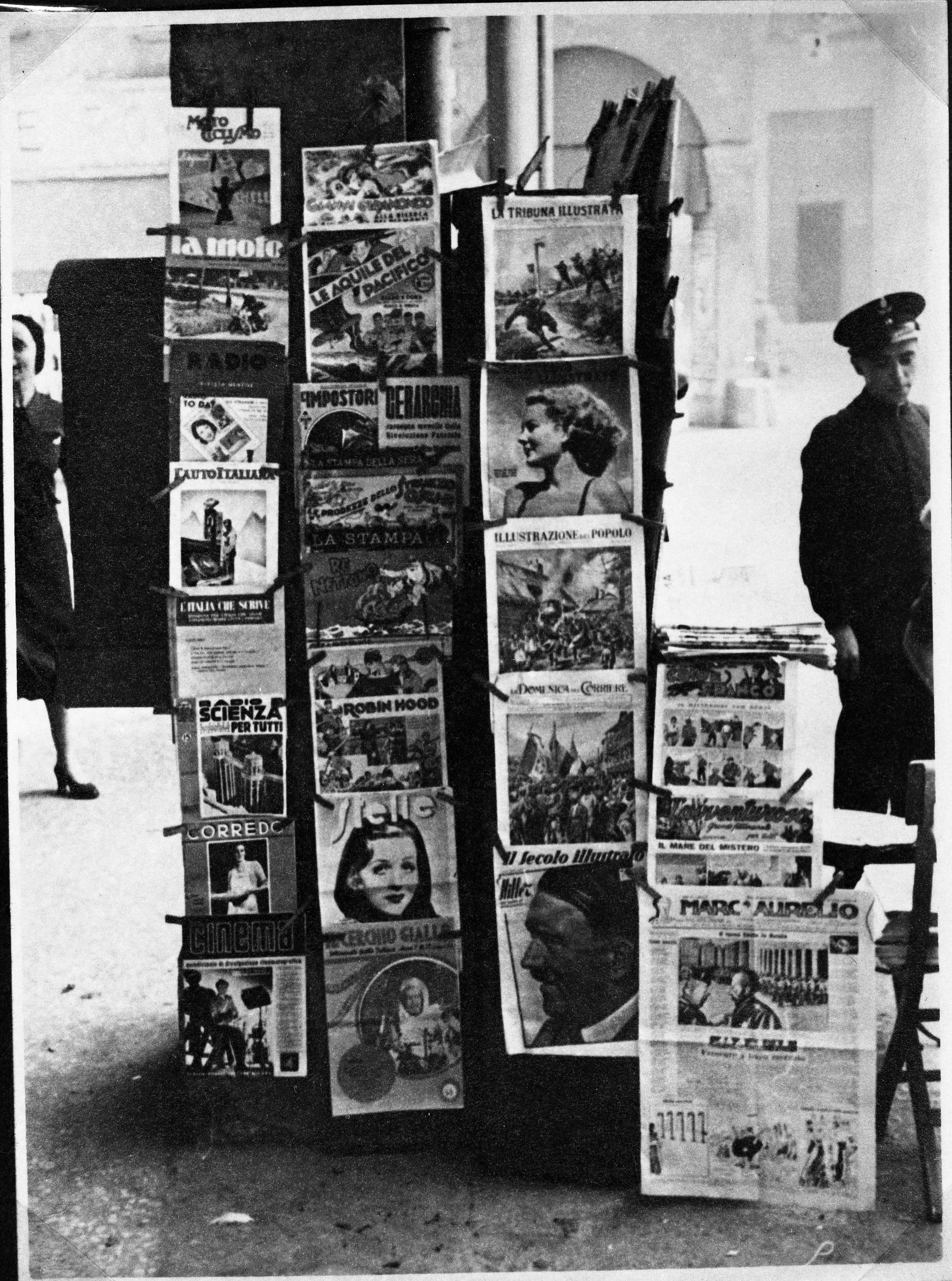
A newsstand photographed in Bologna in the late 1930s by Eva Braun while visiting Italy: on the bottom right there is the Marc'Aurelio.

In 1952 it was launched a Ligurian edition of the magazine, directed by Enzo La Rosa. In 1954 the magazine became fortnightly, and shortly later monthly.

In 1955 Marc'Aurelio was acquired by the publisher Corrado Tedeschi who moved the editorial staff in Florence, and the magazine reprised its weekly basis. It eventually ceased its publications in 1958.

Many young collaborators of the magazine including Federico Fellini, Steno, Vittorio Metz, Ettore Scola, Cesare Zavattini, Age & Scarpelli, Ruggero Maccari, after the World War II started successful careers in the Italian film industry.

In 1973 Delfina Metz (the daughter of Vittorio), with the artistic supervision of Enrico De Seta, shortly relaunched the magazine, which definitively closed the same year after 26 issues.

== See also ==
- List of magazines in Italy
