= Anna Maria Cochetti =

Italian American poet and translator (1889–?)

Anna Maria Cochetti (1889 – 1999?) was an Italian-born, Italian-American poet and translator. In the United States, she published under the pseudonym "Anna Maria Armi".

== Personal life ==
Anna Maria Cochetti was born in 1899 in Rome. She was the daughter of a Roman lawyer named Enrico Cocchetti. She graduated with a degree in literature in 1922. Her thesis was titled Emerson nelle relazioni spirituali con Carlyle [Emerson in Spiritual Relationship with Carlyle]―a copy of her thesis is in the Biblioteca del Centro in Rome.

Cochetti was the first wife of Italian-born, Italian American journalist and political theorist Max Ascoli. They married on November 29, 1925, in Rome. She followed Ascoli to the United States when he first came as a Rockefeller Foundation scholar in 1931. Ascoli dedicated his book Intelligence in Politics (New York, W.W. Norton and Company, 1936) to her. However, they legally separated in 1938 and divorced in 1940. In his chapter “Max Ascoli: A Lifetime of Rockefeller Connections,” Rosario Tosiello suggests that the dissolution of their marriage was due to Ascoli’s assimilation into American society.

Cochetti became a US citizen in 1939.

== Original poetry ==
Her book of poetry, titled in English Poems was published in 1941. It included 56 new poems written by Cochetti as well as 22 translated poems by the likes of Horace, Catullus, Michelangelo and Petrarch. Critics noted that her original poems were clearly influenced by her interest in translation of the classics.

== Translation of Italian poetry ==
She was also an important translator for a larger collection of writings by the early modern Tuscan poet and scholar Petrarch. Her translations were seen as a fresh take on English translations of the poet's work, which worked to take the rhythmic sonnet form from Italian with it in to the English. Some later translators of Petrarch's work did not appreciate this tactic and considered Cochetti's translation "rhyme forcing." She translated a selection of sonnets and songs in 1946 (republished in 1968). A contemporary review by Thomas G. Bergin in The New York Times was not overwhelmingly favorable of Cochetti's style of translation; writing "Almost every sonnet or canzone in the translation contains a line where the inflection and rhythm to the English ear are simply not musical, often indeed not technically correct. Miss Armi also makes no effort to be faithful to the Petrarchian rhyme scheme." This was the only complete translation of his Conazoniere at the time.

== Published works ==
=== Original poetry in English ===
- Poems by Anna Armi, 1941, 1st edition. Random House.

=== English translations of Italian poetry ===
- Petrarch: Sonnets and Songs. Translated by Anna Maria Armi, New York: Pantheon Books Inc., 1946
- Petrarch: Sonnets and Songs. Translated by Anna Maria Armi, Grosset & Dunlap, 1968
