= Zemelj =

- Location in Slovenia
- Coordinates: 45°36′39.02″N 15°16′53.52″E
- Country: Slovenia
- Traditional region: White Carniola
- Statistical region: Southeast Slovenia
- Municipality: Metlika

Area
  - Total: 0.43 km^{2} (0.17 sq mi)
- Elevation: 145.3 m (477 ft)

Population (2002)
  - Total: 64
- Postal code: 8332

Zemelj (pronounced [ˈzeːməl]) is a small settlement on the left bank of the Kolpa River in the Municipality of Metlika in the White Carniola area of southeastern Slovenia. The area is part of the traditional region of Lower Carniola and is now included in the Southeast Slovenia Statistical Region.

The local church, built outside the settlement to the south, is dedicated to Saint Helena and belongs to the Parish of Podzemelj. It was built in the 19th century.
