= Amelia Pincherle Rosselli =

Italian writer (1870–1954)

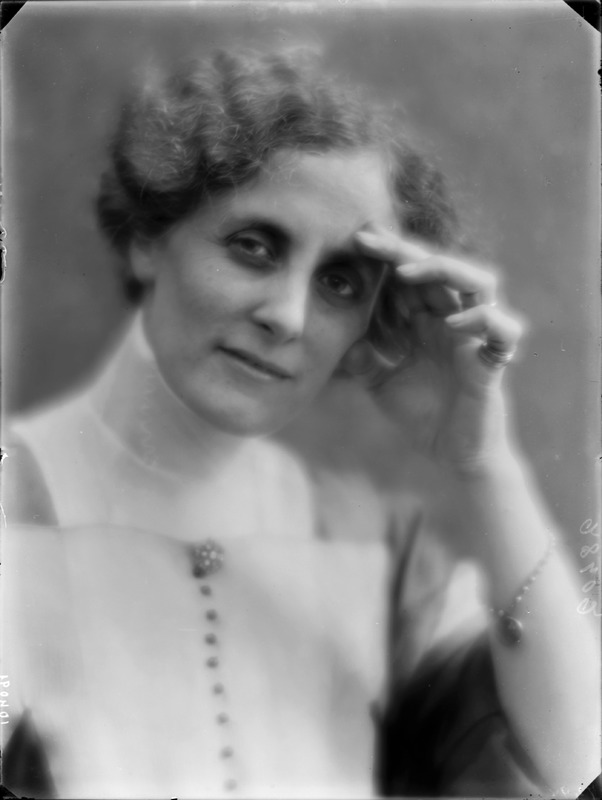
- Born: Amelia Pincherle Moravia; 16 January 1870; Venice
- Died: 26 December 1954 (aged 84); Florence
- Occupation: Playwright
- Children: 3
- Relatives: Alberto Moravia; Amelia Rosselli
- Writing career
- Notable work: Her Soul

Amelia Pincherle Rosselli (16 January 1870 – 26 December 1954) was an accomplished writer known primarily as a playwright. She is remembered throughout Italy as the mother of anti-fascist activists, Carlo and Nello Rosselli. Her first drama, Anima, won a national prize from the Italian state and was performed in Turin on October 29, 1898. Rosselli successfully continued to write for the stage, both in Italian and in the Venetian dialect of her native city. She also published short stories, books for children and translations from French literature.

== Biography ==
The daughter of Giacomo Pincherle Moravia (1820-1887) and Emilia Capon (1829-1901), she was born Amelia Pincherle Moravia in Venice to a family of wealthy non-practising Jews.

In 1885, the Pincherle family moved to Rome where, in 1892, Amelia married Giuseppe Emanuele "Joe" Rosselli (1867–1911) whose family was famous for their patriotic ties to Giuseppe Mazzini. The couple moved to Vienna where Joe continued his studies in music and where their first son, Aldo (1895-1916), was born. In 1896, the couple relocated to Florence and, in 1897, to Rome where their sons, Carlo (1899-1937) and Nello (1900-1937) were born. Amelia separated from Joe in 1903 and moved to Florence that same year with the children.

Aldo was killed in combat during World War I. Carlo and Nello became anti-fascist activists, responsible for the clandestine publication, Non Mollare! (Don't give up!). Carlo was arrested and incarcerated, but managed to escape to France where he was a founder of the anti-fascist resistance movement, Giustizia e Libertà (Justice and Liberty). Nello remained in Italy and retreated from politics in order to protect his mother and family. However, in 1937, while Nello was on a visit to Carlo, both brothers were assassinated by the French fascists, or cagoulards, on Mussolini's order.

After the murder of her sons, Rosselli exiled herself from Italy, moving to Switzerland, England and the United States. She returned to Italy in 1946.

She died in Florence at the age of 84. Her granddaughter, Amelia Rosselli (1930-1996), became a noted Italian poet. Her nephew, Alberto Moravia (1907-1990), became a well-known Italian author.

== Selected works ==
- Anima, drama in three acts, first performed in 1898 and published in 1901; (1997 Modern edition introduced by Natalia Costa-Zalessow, editor)
- Illusione, comedy, published in 1906 with: L'idea fissa, one-act psychological drama, recited in 1901 and published 1906: L'amica, published in 1906
- El rèfolo, comedy in Venetian dialect, staged in Rome at Teatro Quirinale in 1909 and published 1910
- El socio del papà, comedy in Venetian dialect, staged in 1911 at Teatro Goldoni di Venezia and published in 1912
- San Marco, historical/patriotic drama, recited in 1913 at Teatro Manzoni, Milan, and published in 1914
- Emma Liona, patriotic drama, never performed; published in 1924
- Her Soul (Anima) translated into English by Natalia Costa-Zalessow with the collaboration of Joan E. Borrelli in Kelly, Katherine E., ed., Modern Drama By Women, 1880s-1930s (1996)
