= Alberto Tarchiani =

Italian journalist, politician and diplomat (1885–1964)

Italian Ambassador to the United States
- In office 23 February 1945 – 1954

Personal details
- Born: 01 November 1885 Rome
- Died: 30 November 1964 (aged 79) Rome
- Education: Sapienza University of Rome

Alberto Tarchiani (11 November 1885 – 30 November 1964) was an Italian journalist, politician, and diplomat.

== Biography ==
Born in Rome, Tarchiani studied at La Sapienza, at the University of Genoa and at the University of Florence, and started working as a journalist in 1903. In 1907 he moved to New York, where he edited the weekly magazine Il Cittadino. In 1915 he returned to Italy to serve as a voluntary in the Italian Army in World War I. In 1919 he was employed by Corriere della Sera, remaining there until 1925, when because of his opposition to Fascism he was forced to emigrate in France.

In Paris, Tarchiani was among the founders of Giustizia e Libertà and collaborated to the newspaper La giovine Italia. Following the 1940 German invasion of France, he moved to New York where he was secretary of the Mazzini Society in which he actively worked with his close ally Alberto Cianca. With the fall of Fascism, Tarchiani served as minister of public works in the Badoglio cabinet, as head the Office of National Reconstruction in the subsequent Bonomi cabinet, and as ambassador in the United States from 1945 to 1955.

== Honors ==
Order of Merit of the Italian Republic 1st Class / Knight Grand Cross – 30 December 1952

== See also ==
- Ministry of Foreign Affairs (Italy)
- Foreign relations of Italy
