= August Bellanca =

Italian-born American labor activist (1880-1969)

- Born: 1880; Sciacca, Sicily, Italy
- Died: 1969 (aged 88–89)
- Occupation: Labor activist
- Spouse: Dorothy Jacobs (m. 1918; died 1946)
- Relatives: Giuseppe Bellanca (brother)

August Bellanca (1880–1969) was an Italian-born American labor activist who was a founder and three-time vice president of the Amalgamated Clothing Workers of America (ACWA). The ACWA was formed as an offshoot of United Garment Workers and was the result of tensions between the national union and urban locals. Bellanca served as vice president at intervals over a period of fifty years, from 1916-1934, 1946-1948 and also from 1952-1966.

== Biography ==
Bellanca was born in Sciacca, Sicily in 1880 and migrated to the United States in 1900. His brothers included Giuseppe, an aeronautical designer, and Frank, a labor leader and businessman.

Before 1914, garment workers were part of the United Garment Workers (UGW), which began refusing to support its members following the 1910 Chicago strikes. The UGW was more politically conservative, while the workers tended to be socialists. The union began actively working against members in urban areas. Bellanca's involvement in 1913 centered on getting support from Italian workers for the 1913 New York Garment workers strike. He particularly concentrated his efforts on preventing Italian scabs from crossing picket lines. Bellanca and Fiorello LaGuardia, future congressman and three-term New York City mayor, joined forces to prevent rifts between Italian and Jewish union members. Their combined efforts were successful and served as an introduction between LaGuardia and New York labor leaders. LaGuardia benefited when he ran for mayor in 1933, when he was able to garner support from both Jewish and Italian immigrants. The strike became the final act for the UGW. Bellanca founded its replacement, the Amalgamated Clothing Workers of America (ACWA), in 1914.

Bellanca was strongly anti-Fascist and helped create the Mazzini Society, an American organization devoted to opposing Benito Mussolini. He was crucial in organizing aid to Italy following the War. In 1957, Bellanca was recognized by the Italian Government with the Italian Order of Merit, and in 1967 was bestowed the Knight of the Grand Cross of the Order of Merit of the Republic of Italy.

== Personal life ==
In August 1918, Bellanca married Dorothy Jacobs Bellanca, also a prominent labor leader with origins in the ACWA. Dorothy Bellanca would rise to prominence as a defender of women's rights among the male-dominated ACWA. They had no children, and lived in New York City. The two devoted their lives to the ACWA and were long-time proponents of trade unionism.
