= Paul Vangelisti =

American poet, broadcaster (born 1945)

Paul Vangelisti (born 1945) is an American poet, editor, translator, educator, and broadcaster.

== Biography ==
He graduated from the University of San Francisco in 1967 with a Bachelor of Arts in English and Philosophy. He attended Trinity College, Dublin, Ireland, for a year as a research Fellow and moved to Los Angeles in 1968 to attend the University of Southern California, where he took several graduate level classes but never earned a degree.

Vangelisti has edited several anthologies of poetry, including one each in Italian and Polish. His anthologies of Los Angeles area poets, such as "Specimen '73", were among the first such collections to begin defining the historical trajectory of post-World War II poetry in Southern California. His first such volume, "Anthology of L.A. Poets", was co-edited with Charles Bukowski and Neeli Cherkovski. Most recently, he edited "L.A. Exiles", an anthology of displaced Los Angeles writers.

Vangelisti is the author of almost twenty collections of poetry, including "Air" (1973), "Portfolio" (1978), "Another You" (1980), "Villa", "Rime" (1983), and "Nemo" (1995). He was awarded a Creative Writing Fellowship from the National Endowment for the Arts in 1988. Vangelisti is also well known as a translator of Italian poetry, particularly experimental poets such as Adriano Spatola and Antonio Porta.

Vangelisti produced broadcasts of poetry readings through an association with Pacifica radio station KPFK in Los Angeles, where he worked as a Cultural Affairs Director between 1974 and 1982. While in that position, he initiated and directed L.A.T.E. (Los Angeles Theater of the Ear), which produced both live and recorded radio theater broadcasts of classic plays by Pirandello and Brecht, as well as contemporary playwrights.

Vangelisti is the Chair of the MFA writing program at Otis College of Art and Design in Los Angeles.
