= Mazzini Society =

The Mazzini Society was an antifascist political association, formed on a democratic and republican basis, situating itself within the tradition of the Risorgimento, and created in the United States by Italian-American immigrants in the late 1930s. It was named after Giuseppe Mazzini, a leading figure of Italian reunification in the mid-19th century, who had worked from exile.

== Birth and membership ==
The Mazzini Society was founded by Gaetano Salvemini in Northampton, Massachusetts, on September 24, 1939; later on the journalist Max Ascoli became the president. Among its organizers was a group of republicans belonging to the antifascist resistance movement Giustizia e Libertà. Besides Ascoli and Salvemini, there were Tullia Calabi, Lionello Venturi, Michele Cantarella, Roberto Bolaffio, interim president Renato Poggioli, Giuseppe Antonio Borgese, and Carlo Tresca. Its newsletter was the periodical Mazzini News and later Nazioni unite ('Nations united').

With the German occupation of France in June 1940 many Italian antifascists, exiled beyond the Alps, were forced to emigrate again; they found refuge in the United States. Many of them joined the Mazzini Society: Aldo Garosci, Alberto Cianca, and Alberto Tarchiani, who came from Giustizia e Libertà; Randolfo Pacciardi, the political secretary of the Italian Republican Party, who founded the Mazzinian weekly periodical La Giovine Italia in Paris in 1937; and the former foreign minister Carlo Sforza, who had belonged to the short-lived antifascist Unione Democratica Nazionale party and worked at La Giovine Italia under Tarchiani's direction.

== Alberto Tarchiani as secretary ==
Tarchiani quickly assumed the position of secretary of the association. Through the Mazzini Society, Sforza and Tarchiani planned to obtain the support of the US government for the creation of an Italian National Committee as a form of government in exile, with the progressive advance of Allied troops in North Africa in 1941–42, as well as an "Italian legion" under Randolfo Pacciardi, who had commanded the Garibaldi Battalion in the Spanish Civil War and came to the United States in December 1941.

This course of political action sought to nominate Carlo Sforza as leader of the Italian antifascist movement abroad and, implicitly, future head of government in an Italian liberal democracy liberated from both the Fascist dictatorship and the monarchy. The increasing prominence of Tarchiani and Sforza in the Mazzini Society consequently led to the progressive distancing of Gaetano Salvemini from active decision making.

At the same time, the Mazzini Society served as the organizer for a collection of funds for Italian antifascist exiles, though it ruled out a course of unified action with the Communists. Randolfo Pacciardi was among those favorable to an accord with the Communists but, being in the minority on this question, he quit the Mazzini Society in June 1942.

== The Italian-American Congress of Montevideo ==
The Mazzini Society had greater success in its relations with the Italian community of Central and South America, where an antifascist network and a "Free Italy" movement were formed, headquartered in Buenos Aires. The understandings between the Mazzini Society and Free Italy led to the organizing of an Italian-American Congress that took place from August 14 to 17, 1942, in Montevideo. Pacciardi, although he had joined, was not able to participate due to lack of a valid passport. Instead, Carlo Sforza attended the proceedings after having obtained authorization from the American authorities, presenting an eight-point agenda that was approved by over 10,000 attendees. It proposed a free plebiscite for the Italian people to choose their form of government—in which the victory of the democratic republic was hoped for—and for Italy to join the Atlantic Charter and an organized international system of cooperation and solidarity.

At the end of the proceedings, the conference approved by acclamation a concluding motion, in which was affirmed: "The conference ultimately trusts in Carlo Sforza, who has already assumed, by unanimous and spontaneous nomination, the position of spiritual head of the Italian antifascists and the task of forming an Italian National Council, giving him the authority to organize it in the most opportune conditions."

Nonetheless, the US authorities' attitude toward this project did not go any farther than a tepid understanding, and the analogous contacts that they attempted with the United Kingdom had no success.

== The crisis and return of the antifascist exiles to Italy ==
Between December 1942 and January 1943 there was an internal crisis in the association over an attempt at rapprochement with the Socialists and Communists, proposed by the Italian-American trade unionists Girolamo Valenti, August Bellanca, and Vanni Buscemi Montana to form unitary committees, called Committees for Victory, in which anarchists like Carlo Tresca also took part. The following February Tarchiani and Cianca resigned, being opposed to dilution of the association's liberal democratic basis.

After the July 1943 Allied landing in Sicily, Garosci, Tarchiani, and Cianca sailed back to Europe on the transatlantic liner Queen Mary, which was converted into a troopship. Once in England, after a voyage that was not without uncertainties and dangers, they promptly put the clandestine Giustizia e Libertà radio into operation, broadcasting all day long attacks on the regime and on the monarchy that was guilty of having been complicit, and cooperating with the principal antifascist groups. In August Tarchiani and others in the group succeeded in sailing for Italy, landing—finally—at Salerno.

Authorization for Sforza to return to Italy was, on the other hand, subordinated by the US government (and in particular Under Secretary of State Adolf A. Berle) to the signing of a document by which the former foreign minister pledged not to oppose in any way the actions of the Badoglio government until the nation was completely liberated from the Nazis. However, while Sforza narrowly and literally interpreted the document he signed, British Prime Minister Winston Churchill held that loyalty toward the legitimate government must also extend to the person of the sovereign and the institution of the monarchy. This disagreement with the British prime minister sank Carlo Sforza's aspirations to national leadership, as it entailed a real veto by the British over his nomination as President of the Council when the National Liberation Committee leaned toward picking him as the Bonomi government was about to resign in November 1944.

Pacciardi was able to return to Italy only after the liberation of Rome on June 24, 1944. Tullia Calabi Zevi reported on the Nuremberg Trials and returned to Italy in 1946. Gaetano Salvemini returned in 1949, after having obtained American citizenship, and finally retired to Italy in 1954. Renato Poggioli served in the US Army as a translator 1943–45 and remained in America after the war, becoming a full Harvard professor in 1950; he died in California in 1963.

== Bibliography ==
- Mazzini Society. Nazioni unite. New York, 1942.
- Mercuri, Lamberto. Mazzini News: organo della Mazzini Society (1941-1942), 1990.
- Tirabassi, Maddalena. "La Mazzini Society (1940-46): un'associazione di antifascisti italiani negli Stati Uniti" in Giorgio Spini, Gian Giacomo Migone, and Massimo Teodori (eds.), Italia e America dalla Grande Guerra ad Oggi. (Venice: Marsilio Editori, 1976), pp. 141–58.
- Tirabassi, Maddalena. "Enemy Aliens or Loyal Americans?: The Mazzini Society and the Italian-American Communities". Rivista di Studi Anglo-Americani 4–5 (1984–1985), pp. 399–425.
- Tirabassi, Maddalena. "Nazioni Unite (1942-1946): l'organo ufficiale della Mazzini Society" in L'antifascismo italiano negli Stati Uniti durante la Seconda guerra mondiale (Rome: Archivio Trimestrale, 1984), pp. 295–313.
- Varsori, Antonio. Gli alleati e l'emigrazione democratica antifascista (1940-1943). Florence: Sansoni, 1982.

== See also ==
- Anti-fascism
- Italian resistance movement
