= OGGI =

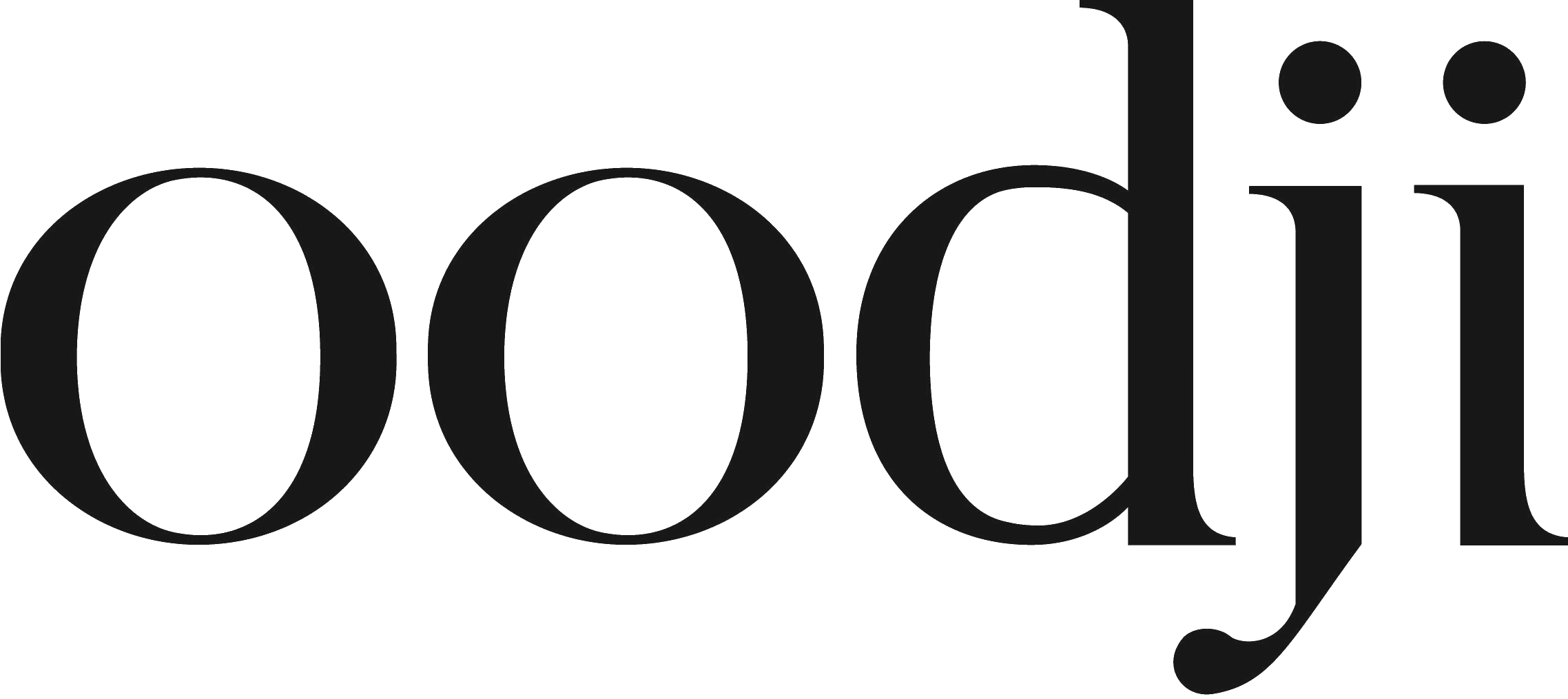
- Type: LLC
- Industry: Retail
- Founded: 1998
- Founders: Dmitriy Garbuzov, Dmitriy Ermakov
- Headquarters: Saint Petersburg, Russia
- Products: Clothing, shoes, accessories
- Revenue: $300 million (2011)
- Website: oodji.com

Oodji (in 1998-2011 – OGGI) is a youth fashion chain operating in Russia and former Soviet countries. The brand is specialized in the development and production of clothes and the distribution through a wide network of brand shops.

== History ==
The first OGGI shop opened its doors in 1998 in Saint Petersburg. The founders of the brand are Dmitry Garbuzov and Dmitry Yermakov.

From 1998 to 2011 I worked under the brand "OGGI", producing only women's clothes and accessories. Since 2011 the brand produce men's clothes and accessories, since 2012 - kids' clothes and shoes.

For 2011, the brand had about 400 own and franchised stores with women's and men's clothing.

Over 280 OGGI shops have been opened since 1998 in more than a hundred cities around Russia and Ukraine. In 2011-2015 Oodji had shops in Poland, Czech Republic and Slovenia. The brand belongs to the "August" company (the head - Dmitry Garbuzov).

== Financial indicators ==
In 2010 OGGI's revenue was $302 million (according to Esper Group estimates).

The company's revenue for 2020 amounted to 5.23 billion rubles.

== Boycott of OGGI ==
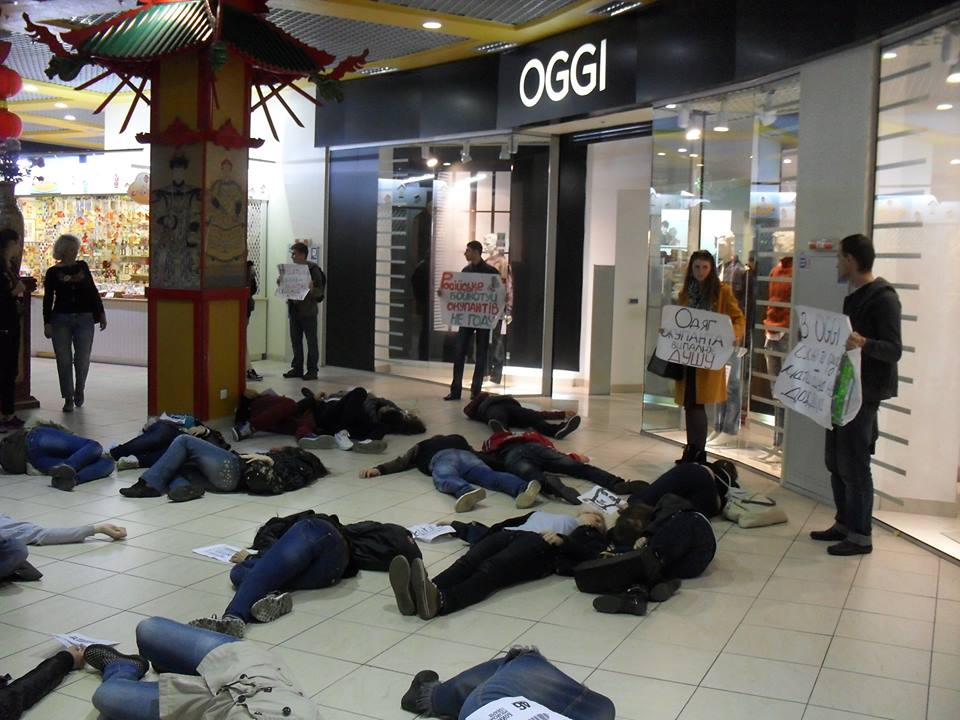
Flash mob near "OGGI" in Kyiv, September 2014

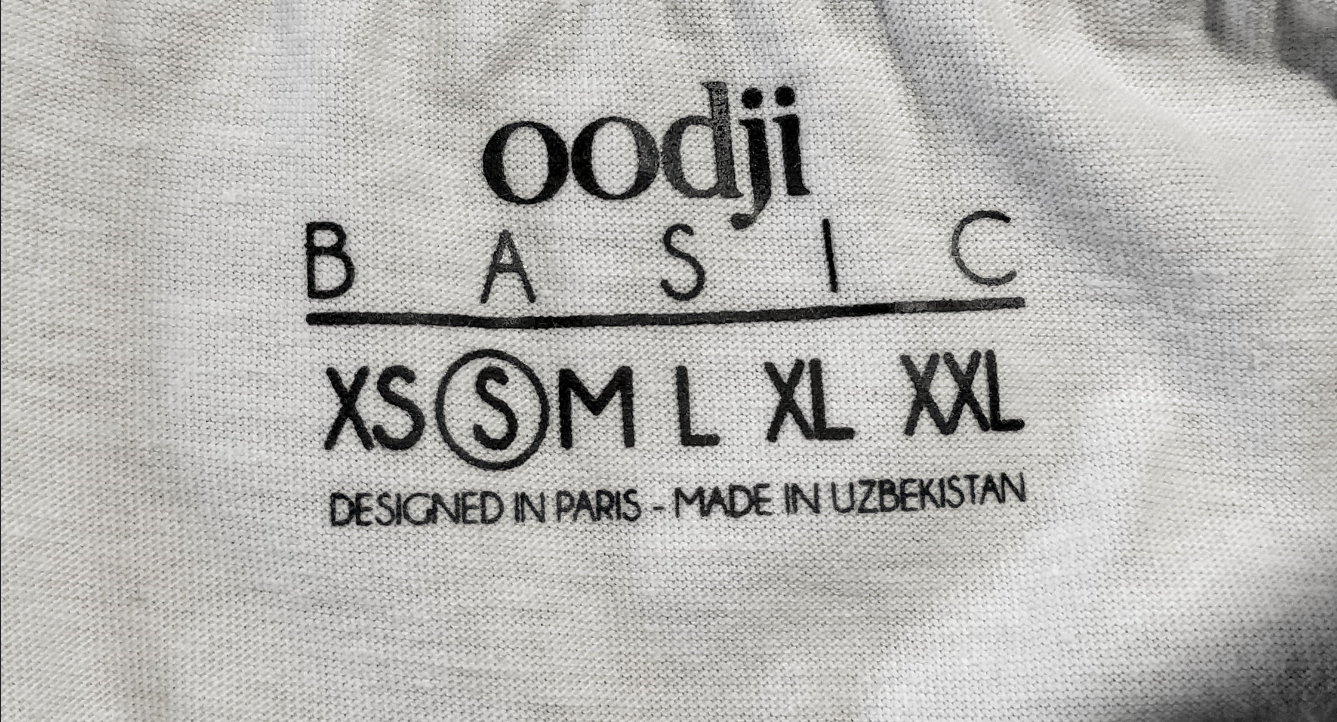
Mandatory labelling: Designed in Paris and made in Uzbekistan.

Since 2013, in Ukraine company has become the object of attention of activists of the campaign "Do not buy Russian goods!" Activists urge not to buy in markets "OGGI" nothing pointing to the owners of Russian origin network. Also OGGI hit to public lists of Russian goods of activists and journalists.

== Stores ==
- Russia: 252 stores

City	Stores
Saint-Petersburg	25
Moscow	76
Nizhniy Novgorod	8
Total	109

Name Of District	Stores
Central Federal District	31
Northwestern Federal District	12
Volga Federal District	38
Siberian Federal District	23
Urals Federal District	14
Southern Federal District	16
Far Eastern Federal District	9
Total	143

- Ukraine: 28 stores
- Kazakhstan: 5 stores
- Armenia: 2 stores
- Poland: 15 stores
- Czech Republic: 4 stores
- Belarus: 5 stores
- Kyrgyzstan: 3 stores
- Moldova: 5 stores
- Slovakia: 2 stores
