= Meyric R. Rogers =

Anglo-American curator and design historian

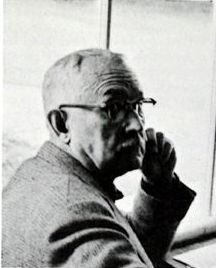

Meyric R. Rogers (1893–1972) was an Anglo-American curator and design historian.

== Life ==
Meyric Reynold Rogers was born to Reynold and Elizabeth Rogers in Kings Norton, England on January 8, 1893. In his youth, he moved to the US and attended Sommerville High School. He attended Harvard College and graduated in 1916. After graduation, he continued his studies in the Architecture School, while teaching in the Harvard Fine Arts School and working as the Assistant Curator of Decorative Arts at the Metropolitan Museum. He received his Masters in Architecture in 1919. Rogers married Anne Strother Kirk in 1928. They had two children, Edith Elizabeth "Beth" (born 1929) and Meyric Kirk "Myke." The couple divorced in 1948.

== Career ==
After completing his Masters at Harvard, he received a teaching position at Smith College. In 1927, Rogers took the position of Director of the Baltimore Museum. After his work at Smith and the Baltimore Museum, Rogers accepted a position at Harvard University as an Associate Professor of Fine Arts and acting Chairman of the Board of Tutors in the Division of Fine Arts. He served as the Director of City Art Museum of St. Louis from 1929–1939. Rogers became the appointed AIC Curator of Decorative Arts Department in 1939. In 1950, he served as a juror for the canonical Good Design exhibition, organized by MoMA. After his position at AIC, Rogers was named the Art Curator at Yale University in 1957. In 1959, Rogers created the American Furniture Study Center at Yale.

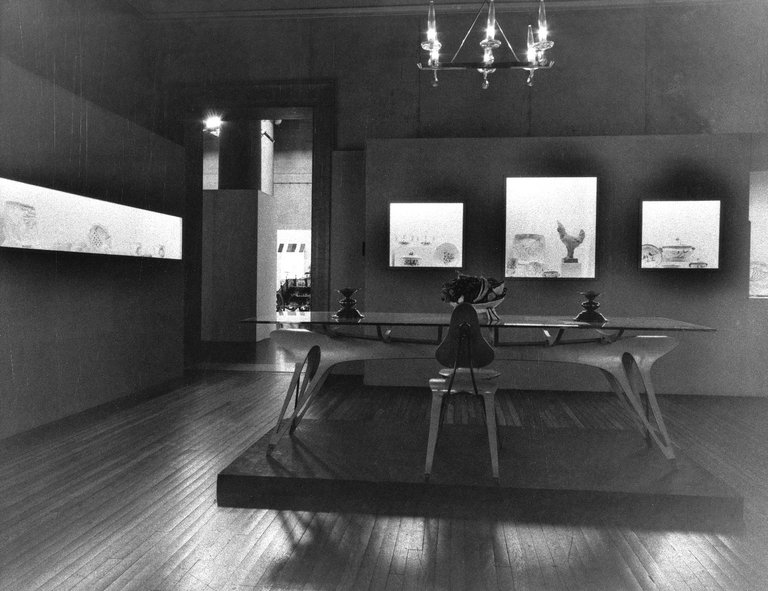
Installation view of the Italy at Work: Her Renaissance in Design Today exhibition at the Brooklyn Museum in 1950

== Important exhibitions ==
- 1935 George Caleb Bingham : the Missouri artist, 1811-1879 art MoMA
- 1950–53 (co-curated with Charles Nagel) Italy at Work: Her Renaissance in Design Today at AIC

== Publications ==
- The Pierpont Morgan Wing: A Handbook (New York: Metropolitan Museum of Art, 1925), also by Joseph Breck
- Four American painters: George Caleb Bingham ([New York] Published for the Museum of Modern Art by Arno Press, 1930) also by James B. Musick, and Arthur Pope. Winslow Homer, Albert P. Ryder, Thomas Eakins, with texts by Frank Jewett Mather Jr., Bryson Burroughs, and Lloyd Goodrich
- George Caleb Bingham : the Missouri artist, 1811-1879. (New York : The Museum of Modern Art, 1935), also by James B Musick, Arthur Pope, and George Caleb Bingham
- Venetian painting of the XVIIIth century; loan exhibition, April 6 to April 18, 1936. (New York: M. Knoedler and co., 1936)
- The development of flower painting from the seventeenth century to the present : special loan exhibition, City Art Museum, St. Louis, May, 1937. (St. Louis : The City Art Museum, 1937)
- Carl Milles : an interpretation of his work (New Haven : Yale University Press, 1940)
- American rooms in miniature ([Chicago] : The Art Institute of Chicago, [1941]), with Narcissa Niblack Thorne
- Handbook to the European rooms in miniature, ([Chicago] : The Art Institute of Chicago, [1943]), also by Art Institute of Chicago, Narcissa Niblack Thorne, and Cleveland Museum of Art
- Handbook to the Lucy Maud Buckingham medieval collection ([Chicago] Art Institute of Chicago, 1945), also with Lucy Maud Buckingham and Oswald Goetz
- American interior design : the traditions and development of domestic design from colonial times to the present ( Ann Arbor, University of Michigan Press, 1947), also by Art Institute of Chicago
- Handbook to the European rooms in miniature, ([Chicago], 1948), also by Art Institute of Chicago, James Ward Thorne, and Cleveland Museum of Art
- Italy at Work: Her Renaissance in Design Today, edited by The Art Institute of Chicago, (Rome: The Compagnia Nazionale Artigiana, 1950.) Foreword by Walter Dorwin Teague
- Early American silver selected from the Mabel Brady Garvan collection, Yale University ([New Haven] : [Yale University Art Gallery], 1960) Also with John Marshall Phillips
- Garvan furniture at Yale ([New Haven] : [Yale University Art Gallery], 1960)
