= Charles Nagel (architect) =

American architect (1899–1992)

Charles Nagel Jr.
- Born: 1899
- Died: 1992 (aged 92–93); Massachusetts
- Education: Yale University
- Occupation: Architect
- Parent(s): Charles Nagel and Anne Shepley
- Practice: Jamieson & Spearl
- Projects: Gateway Arch

Charles Nagel Jr. (1899 – 1992) was a Saint Louis, Missouri architect, curator, and museum director.

Nagel Jr. was the son of Charles Nagel, a lawyer and politician, and his second wife Anne Shepley. He attended Yale University, where he earned three degrees, culminating with an M.F.A. in architecture.

He was employed at the Saint Louis architectural firms of Jamieson & Spearl and Hall & Proetz, and with Coolidge, Shepley, Bulfinch, Abbott in Boston, and later the firm of Nagel & Dunn in Saint Louis. He served as curator of Decorative Arts at Yale's Gallery of Fine Arts and as director of the Saint Louis Art Museum, the Brooklyn Museum, and the National Portrait Gallery.

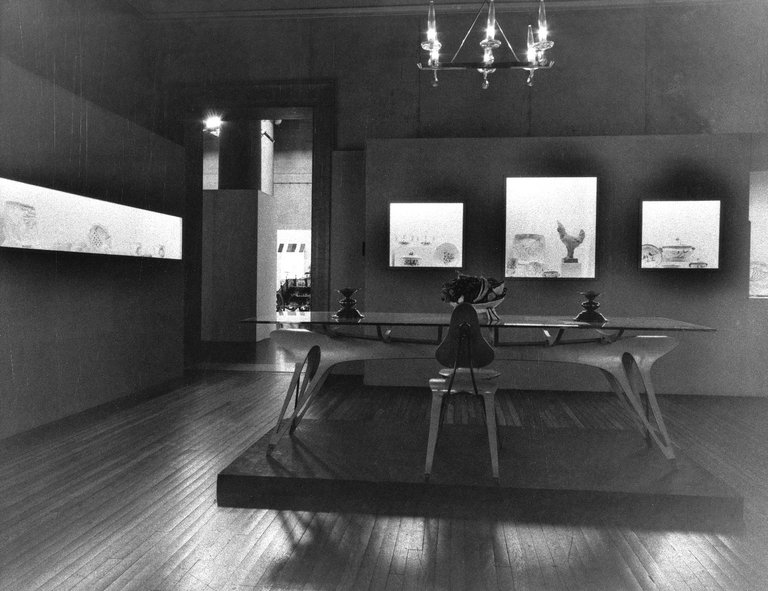
Installation view of the Italy at Work: Her Renaissance in Design Today exhibition at the Brooklyn Museum in 1950

At the Brooklyn Museum, Nagel co-organized a major exhibition of Italian design—"Italy at Work: Her Renaissance in Design Today"—which traveled to twelve U.S. museums from 1950 to 1953. His co-organizer was Meyric R. Rogers, then the Curator of Decorative and Industrial Arts at the Art Institute of Chicago.

Nagel served as juror and secretary of the Jefferson National Expansion Memorial Competition, which led to the selection of the Gateway Arch design.

He died in Massachusetts, on 20 February 1992, and is buried there.
