= Carlo Rosselli =

Italian political leader (1899–1937)

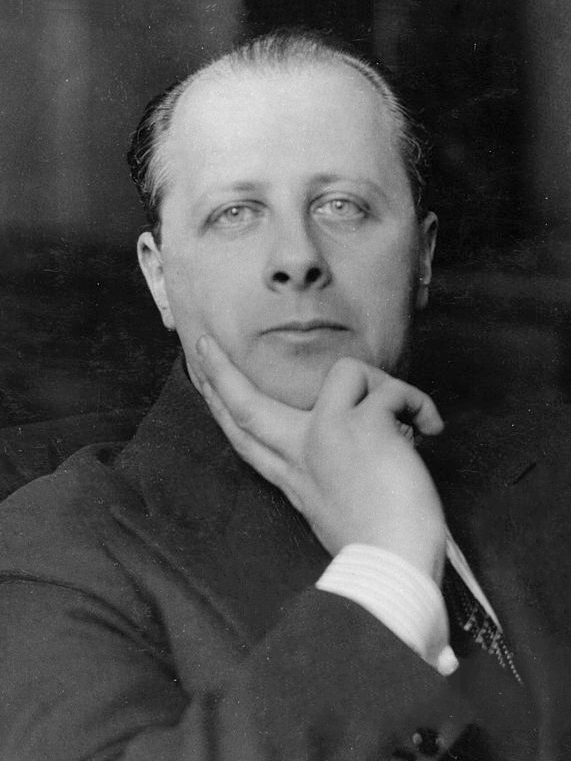
- Born: Carlo Alberto Rosselli; 16 November 1899; Rome, Italy
- Died: 9 June 1937 (aged 37); Bagnoles-de-l'Orne, France
- Occupations: Political leader; journalist; historian; anti-fascist activist
- Writing career
- Notable work: Liberal Socialism

Carlo Alberto Rosselli (16 November 1899 – 9 June 1937) was an Italian anti-fascist, journalist, and philosopher.

He developed a theory of "liberal socialism," a form of post-Marxist, reformist socialism directly inspired by the success of the British Labour Party and the Labour movement in the UK, as well as by the historical-political tradition of liberal and libertarian radicalism, both in Italy and abroad. In 1925, he founded the clandestine publication Non Mollare, and in 1926 he founded the Milan-based journal Ill Quarto Stato, with Pietro Nenni. In 1929, Rosselli founded the anti-fascist militant movement Giustizia e Libertà. Rosselli personally took part in combat in the Spanish Civil War, where he served on the Republican side. He was murdered, alongside his brother, by fascists in France on the order of Benito Mussolini.

== Early life and education ==
Rosselli was born in Rome to a wealthy Tuscan Jewish family. His mother, Amelia Pincherle Rosselli, had been active in republican politics and thought and had participated in the unification of Italy. She was also a playwright and children's book author. His father, Giuseppe Emanuele "Joe" Rosselli (1867–1911) died when Carlo was 12. Both his maternal and paternal families were politically active supporting the Italian Risorgimento. In 1903, he was taken to Florence with his mother and siblings, when his parents separated.

After Italy joined the First World War, in 1915, his brother Aldo, joined as the army as an officer and died in 1916 in combat, posthumously receiving a silver medal for valor. Carlo joined the Italian Armed Forces and fought in the alpine campaign, rising to the rank of second lieutenant. Beginning in 1917 Carlo contributed to the publication Noi giovani (We, the Young"), which had been founded by his brother Nello.

After the war, through the influence of his brother Nello, Rosselli studied in Florence with Gaetano Salvemini, who would thereafter remain a constant companion of both the Rosselli brothers. It was in this period that he became a socialist, sympathetic to the reformist ideas of Filippo Turati, in contrast to the revolutionary socialist thinking of Giacinto Menotti Serrati. In 1921, he graduated with a degree in political sciences from the University of Florence with a thesis about syndicalism. He later undertook a law degree, which he would pursue in Turin and Milan, where he met Luigi Einaudi and Piero Gobetti. He graduated in 1923 from the University of Siena. For several weeks, he visited London where he studied the workings of the British Labour Party, which would deeply influence him and his ideology.

== Rise of fascism ==
An active supporter of the Unitary Socialist Party (PSU) of Turati, Giacomo Matteotti, and Claudio Treves, Rosselli began writing for Critica Sociale (Social Criticism) a journal edited by Turati. After the murder of Matteotti, Rosselli pushed for a more active opposition to Italian fascism. With the help of Salvemini and Ernesto Rossi, he founded the clandestine publication Non mollare (Do Not Give Up). During the following months, fascist violence against the left became increasingly severe. Rossi left the country for France, followed by Salvemini. On 15 February 1926, fellow activist Piero Gobetti died in exile in Paris from injuries sustained in a fascist attack in Turin in 1925. Still in Italy, Rosselli and Pietro Nenni founded the review Quarto Stato (Fourth Estate), which was banned after a few months.

Later in 1926, Rosselli organized with Sandro Pertini and Ferruccio Parri the escape of Turati to France. While Pertini followed Turati to France, Parri and Rosselli were captured and convicted for their roles in Turati's escape and sentenced to a period of confinement on the island of Lipari (1927). It was then that Rosselli began to write his most famous work, Socialismo liberale (Liberal Socialism). In July 1929, he escaped to Tunisia, from where he travelled to France, to join the community of Italian anti-fascists including Emilio Lussu and Francesco Fausto Nitti. Nitti later portrayed Rosselli's adventurous escape in the book Le nostre prigioni e la nostra evasione (Our Prisons and Our Escape), published in Italian in 1946; the first English edition, published in 1929, was titled Escape.

== Exile in Paris and Giustizia e Libertà ==
Flag of Giustizia e Libertà, an Italian anti-fascist resistance movement founded and initially led by Rosselli

In 1929, with Alberto Cianca, Lussu, Nitti, and a partisan circle of refugees that had formed around Salvemini, Rosselli helped found the anti-fascist movement Giustizia e Libertà (GL). GL published various issues of the review and the notebooks titled Giustizia e Libertà which appeared as a weekly magazine and newspaper, and was active in the organizing various spectacular actions, the most notable of which was the flight over Milan by Bassanesi in 1930. In 1930, he published a French edition of Socialismo liberale, titled Socialisme libéral.

The book was at once a passionate critique of Marxism and a creative synthesis of democratic socialism, Marxist revisionism (Eduard Bernstein, Turati, and Treves) and of classical Italian liberalism (Benedetto Croce, Francisco Saverio Merlino, and Salvemini). It also contained a critique of the Stalinism of the Third International, which had lumped together social democracy, bourgeois liberalism, and fascism under the derisive formula of "social fascism". As a result, Palmiro Togliatti, one of the most important leaders of the Communist Party of Italy (PCd'I) and later the Italian Communist Party (PCI), described Liberal Socialism as "libellous anti-socialism" and called Rosselli "a reactionary ideologue who has nothing to do with the working class".

GL joined the Concentrazione Antifascista Italiana (Italian Anti-Fascist Concentration), a union of all the non-communist anti-fascist forces (republican, socialist, and nationalist) that sought to promote and coordinate the activities of exiles opposing fascism in Italy. The organization also launched the weekly political magazine Giustizia e Libertà. Rosselli was the founding editor of the weekly and served in the post from 1934 to 1937. Following his assassination in 1937, Alberto Cianca replaced him in the post.

== Spanish Civil War ==
After the rise of Nazism in Germany, the paper began to call for insurgency, revolutionary action, and military action in order to prevent the Italian and German regimes before plunging Europe into a tragic war. Its editors wrote that Spain seemed destined to share the fate of all fascist states. In July 1936, the Spanish Civil War erupted as the fascist-monarchical-led army attempted a coup d'état against the republican government of the Popular Front. Rosselli helped lead the Italian anti-fascist supporters of the Spanish Republican Army, criticizing the neutrality policies of France and Britain, especially as Italy and Germany sent arms and troops in support of the rebels. In August, Rosselli and the GL organized their own brigades of volunteers to support the Second Spanish Republic.

With Camillo Berneri, Rosselli headed the Matteotti Battalion, a mixed volunteer unit of Italian anarchists, liberals, socialists, and communists. The unit was sent to the Aragon front, and participated in a victory against Francoist forces in the Battle of Monte Pelato. Speaking on Barcelona Radio in November, Rosselli popularized the slogan Oggi in Spagna, domani in Italia ("Today in Spain, tomorrow in Italy"). After falling ill, Rosselli was sent back to Paris, from where he continued to organize support for the anti-fascist cause, and proposed an even broader "popular front" while remaining critical of the Communist Party of Spain (PCE) and the Soviet government of Joseph Stalin. In 1937, Berneri was killed by Communist forces during a purge of anarchists in Barcelona. With the fall of the Spanish Republic in 1939, GL partisans were forced to flee to France.

== Murder ==
In June 1937, Rosselli and his brother visited the French resort town of Bagnoles-de-l'Orne. On 9 June, the two were killed by a group of cagoulards, militants of La Cagoule, a French fascist group. Archival documents later implicated Mussolini's regime in authorizing the murder. The two brothers were buried in the Père Lachaise Cemetery in Paris; in 1951, the family repatriated their remains to Italy and reinterred them at the Monumental Cemetery of Trespiano, a frazione of Florence. His British-born wife Marion Catherine Cave, their three children, Giovanni Andrea "John", Amelia "Melina", and Andrew, and his mother Amelia Pincherle Rosselli survived him.

== Thought ==
Rosselli published only one book, Liberal Socialism. This work marked Rosselli as a heretic on the Italian left of his time, where Marx's Das Kapital, albeit variously understood, was still regarded as the main reliable source of political analysis and guidance. The influence of the British labour movement, which he knew well, was significant. Based on the electoral successes of the Labour Party, Rosselli was convinced that the norms of liberal democracy were essential, not only for building socialism but also for its realization. This stood in contrast to Leninist tactics, which prioritize organizational power over democratic procedures. Rosselli's synthesis can be summarized as follows: "[parliamentary] liberalism is the method, Socialism is the aim".

As a democratic socialist, Rosselli rejected the Marxist–Leninist idea of revolution founded on the dictatorship of the proletariat which he felt, as demonstrated in the Russian case, was synonymous with the dictatorship of a single party. Instead, he advocated for a revolution that—as famously stated in the GL program—must be a coherent system of structural reforms aimed at the constructing a socialism that does not limit but rather seeks to enhance individual and associational freedoms. Writing in his final years, Rosselli became more radical in his positions, defending the social organization of the CNT-FAI that he had seen in anarchist Catalonia and Barcelona during the Spanish civil war and whose views were shaped by the rise of Nazi Germany.

== Works ==
- Carlo Rosselli (1994). Liberal Socialism. Edited by Nadia Urbinati. Translated by William McCuaig. Princeton: Princeton University Press.

== Bibliography ==
- Pugliese, Stanislao G. (July 1997). "Death in Exile: The Assassination of Carlo Rosselli". Journal of Contemporary History. 32 (3): 305–319. doi:10.1177/002200949703200302. S2CID 154546885.
- Tranfaglia, Nicola (1968). Carlo Rosselli, dall'Interventismo a Giustizia e Libertà. Bari: Laterza.
- Pugliese, Stanislao G. (1999), Carlo Rosselli: Socialist Heretic and Antifascist Exile, Harvard University Press, ISBN 0-674-00053-6
