= Concentrazione Antifascista Italiana =

Italian anti-fascist organization

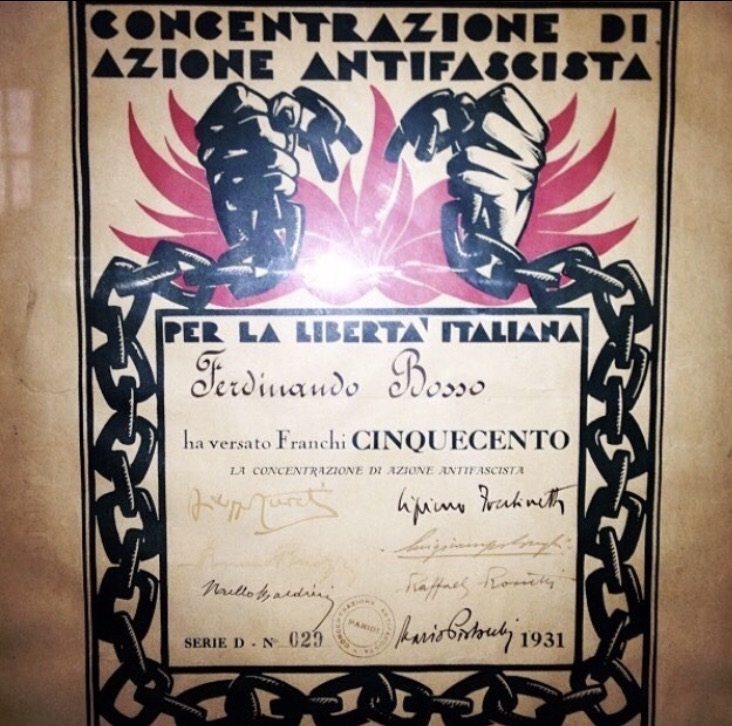
Badge of a CAI member, 1931

Concentrazione Antifascista Italiana (CAI; Italian Anti-Fascist Concentration), officially known as Concentrazione d'Azione Antifascista (Anti-Fascist Action Concentration), was an Italian coalition of anti-fascist groups which existed from 1927 to 1934. It was formed in Paris on 27 March 1927 with the purpose of the organization of Italian antifascist forces in order to reorganize the anti-fascist movement abroad avoiding to repeat the old divisions existing in Italy before the establishment of the regime.

The CAI made a public appeal signed by Claudio Treves and Giuseppe Emanuele Modigliani (PSLI), Pietro Nenni and Angelica Balabanoff (PSI), Fernando Schiavetti and Mario Pistocchi (Italian Republican Party), Bruno Buozzi and Felice Quaglino (CGdL) and by Alceste De Ambris (Italian League for Human Rights, Lega italiana dei diritti dell'uomo, LIDU). Communists remained outside along with liberals, populars and others in order to keep contact with Italian masses "in their social defence and political resistance moves". The official weekly newspaper La Libertà was created on 1 May 1927 with Claudio Treves as director.

Due to the divisions among the members, CAI showed poor accomplishing skills since its first actions: it obtained success defending the emigrates in France, urging the intervention of LIDU in the assistance to the victims (including communists) of police provisions. But the work of CAI was insignificant in Italy and for this reason republicans and leftists in particular kept their distances from it without leaving the organization. The leading group authority of PSLI weighed on CAI and imposed itself as the mediator of financial contributions granted by the Labour and Socialist International, of which it was member. Moreover, this circumstance fuelled the left opposition within the PSI, which had its strengths in the sections of Vienne and Paris, where a third formation was formed in favour of the entry of socialists into the Antifascist Proletarian Committees (Comitati Proletari Antifascisti), organized by PCd'I. Socialist left founded Il nostro Avanti ("Our Avanti") in Paris, a newspaper that antifascists called Il piccolo Avanti ("The Little Avanti").

== Sources ==
- Page on Italian online historical dictionary (in Italian)
- Leonzio, Simone (25 October 2016). "Segretari e leader del socialismo italiano" (PDF). Domani Socialista (in Italian).
- Pugliese, Stanislao G.; Pugliese, Stanislao (2004). Fascism, Anti-fascism, and the Resistance in Italy: 1919 to the Present. Rowman & Littlefield. p. 10. ISBN 978-0-7425-3123-9.
- Tollardo, Elisabetta (2016). Fascist Italy and the League of Nations, 1922-1935. Springer. p. 152. ISBN 978-1-349-95028-7.
- Scala, Spencer M. Di (1988). Renewing Italian Socialism: Nenni to Craxi. Oxford University Press. pp. 6–8. ISBN 978-0-19-536396-8.
- Sacchi, Marco (July 2010). "I socialisti massimalisti nell'emigrazione antifascista". Sotto le bandiere del marxismo (in Italian). Archived from the original on 14 April 2017.
