= Nello Rosselli =

Italian politician (1900–1937)

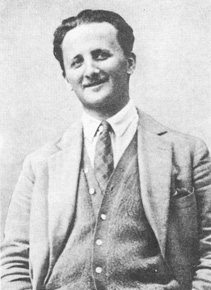
- Rosselli in 1925
- Born: Sabatino Enrico Rosselli; 29 November 1900; Rome, Italy
- Died: 9 June 1937 (aged 36); Bagnoles-de-l'Orne, France
- Occupations: Political leader, journalist, historian, anti-fascist activist

Sabatino Enrico "Nello" Rosselli (29 November 1900 – 9 June 1937) was an Italian socialist leader and historian who was murdered, alongside his brother Carlo Rosselli, by fascists in France on orders of Benito Mussolini. His wife Maria Todesco, their four children (Silvia, Paola, Aldo, and Alberto), and his mother Amelia Pincherle Rosselli survived him.

== Family ==
Rosselli was born on 29 June 1900 in Rome to a prominent Jewish family. His parents were Giuseppe Emanuele "Joe" Rosselli (1867–1911) and Amelia Pincherle (1870–1954), who was the paternal aunt to writer Alberto Moravia. Nello was the youngest of three sons, the others being Aldo Sabatino (1895–1916) who died in World War I, and Carlo Alberto (1899–1937).

== Political career and murder ==
Nello was a member of the reformist Unitary Socialist Party (PSU) of Giacomo Matteotti, Claudio Treves, and Filippo Turati, which had split from the Italian Socialist Party (PSI). After the rise of Italian fascism, he fled to France with his brother, and became active there in anti-fascist and socialist politics, helping to found the group Giustizia e Libertà and aiding the Republicans in the Spanish Civil War, as well as carrying out propaganda missions within Italy.

In June 1937, Nello went to visit his brother Carlo at the French resort town of Bagnoles-de-l'Orne, in Orne. On 9 June, the two were killed by a group of cagoulards, militants of La Cagoule, a French fascist group. Archival documents later implicated Mussolini's regime in authorizing the murder. The two brothers were buried in the Père Lachaise Cemetery in Paris; in 1951, the family moved them to Italy into the Monumental Cemetery of Trespiano, a frazione of Florence.
