= Giustizia e Libertà =

Italian anti-fascist movement

- Emblem of Giustizia e Libertà
- Active: 1929–1945
- Allegiance: Italian anti-fascist resistance
- Type: Partisans
- Part of: Action Party
- Engagements: Spanish Civil War; World War II: Liberation of Italy

Commanders
- Notable commanders: Riccardo Bauer, Carlo Rosselli, Ferruccio Parri, Giorgio Bocca

Giustizia e Libertà (Italian pronunciation: [dʒuˈstittsja e lliberˈta]; lit. 'Justice and Liberty') was an Italian anti-fascist resistance movement, active from 1929 to 1945. The movement was cofounded by Carlo Rosselli, Ferruccio Parri, who later became Prime Minister of Italy, Emilio Lussu, Sandro Pertini, who became President of Italy, and other Italian anti-fascist refugees.

The movement's members held various political beliefs but shared a belief in active, effective opposition to fascism, compared to the older Italian anti-fascist parties. Giustizia e Libertà also made the international community aware of the realities of fascism in Italy, thanks to the work of Gaetano Salvemini.

The movement also played the crucial role of spreading information and raising awareness among international public opinion, unveiling the reality of fascist Italy which was hidden behind regime propaganda, in particular thanks to the actions of Gaetano Salvemini, who had been the inspiration behind the group and the teacher of Rosselli.

== Italian anti-fascist organization (1929–1940) ==
=== Foundation ===
Flag of Giustizia e Libertà

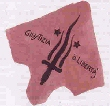
Sleeve emblem Giustizia e Libertà Partisans

The anti-fascist organisation Giustizia e Libertà was established in 1929 by the Italian refugees Riccardo Bauer, Carlo Rosselli, Emilio Lussu, Alberto Tarchiani, and Ernesto Rossi. They had been imprisoned on Lipari and escaped together on 27 July 1929. Once they reached Paris in August, they began to organise resistance against Italian Fascism, forming clandestine groups in Italy and setting up an intense propaganda campaign, publishing under Lussu's maxim: "Insorgere! Risorgere!" (Rebel! Revive!).

Carlo Levi was named a director of the Italian branch along with Leone Ginzburg, a Russian Jew from Odessa who had emigrated with his parents to Turin. The group's logo, a flame placed between a G and L was designed by Gioacchino Dolci, another exile that had escaped from Lipari. The group's members included the exiles Raffaele Rossetti, Alberto Cianca, Vincenzo Nitti, and Francesco Fausto.

=== Early objectives ===
Giustizia e Libertà was committed to militant action to fight the Fascist regime—it tried to be not a political party, but a revolutionary movement. The movement saw Benito Mussolini as a ruthless murderer who himself deserved to be killed as punishment. Various early schemes were designed by the movement in the 1930s to assassinate Mussolini, including one dramatic plan of using an aircraft to drop a bomb on Piazza Venezia where Mussolini resided.

After a series of arrests and trials, (including the conviction of Carlo Levi) the movement was forced in 1930 to curb this activity. In 1931, the organisation joined the Concentrazione Antifascista Italiana (Anti-Fascist Concentration), and in 1932 began promoting a plan that aimed not for the restoration of the pre-fascist political order but for a new social democracy centered around a Republican state. It called for economic rights and administrative decentralisation. The group produced its own journal, on which Salvatorelli, De Ruggiero and others collaborated. This journal reflected the politics of the group's leaders, who sought to distance themselves from communism and the Italian Communist Party.

=== Spanish Civil War ===
At the outbreak of the Spanish Civil War in 1936, the organisation formed its own volunteer brigades to support the Spanish Republic. Carlo Rosselli and Camillo Berneri headed a mixed volunteer unit of anarchist, liberal, socialist, and communist Italians on the Aragon front, whose military successes included a victory against Francoist forces in the Battle of Monte Pelado. They popularised the slogan: "Oggi in Spagna, domani in Italia" (Today in Spain, tomorrow in Italy). In 1937, Camillo Berneri was killed by communist forces during a purge of anarchists in Barcelona. With the fall of the Spanish Republic in 1939, Giustizia e Libertà partisans were forced to flee back to France.

Several members of Giustizia e Libertà, including Aldo Garosci, Alberto Cianca, and Alberto Tarchiani, then emigrated to the United States, where they helped form the antifascist Mazzini Society to promote a liberal democratic republic for Italy. They sailed to England in 1943 and set in operation the clandestine Giustizia e Libertà radio to denounce both Fascism and the monarchy for its complicity in Fascism.

== The military arm of Partito d'Azione (1942–1945) ==
Giustizia e Libertà was forced to cease public operations when German troops occupied France in 1940. Its members were dispersed, but largely reconstituted themselves as the Action Party (Partito d'Azione) in German-occupied Italy following the Armistice of 1943. The military arms of the organisation, the partisan brigades, were still referred to as Giustizia e Libertà.

After 8 September 1943, partisan units under the Giustizia e Libertà banner formed after the Italian capitulation to Allied forces and the creation of the Italian Social Republic puppet state of Nazi Germany. As the largest non-Communist partisan groups, they benefited from provisions and training that were denied to other units by the western Allies. Among the group's best known commanders was Ferruccio Parri, who, using the nom-de-guerre "Maurizio," represented the Action Party in the Military Committee of the National Liberation Committee of Northern Italy (CLNAI). Centres of activity included Turin, Florence, and Milan, where a resistance cell was headed by Ugo La Malfa, Ferruccio Parri, and Adolfo Tino. Parri was arrested in Milan and turned over to the Germans, but he was later exchanged for German officials imprisoned by the partisans. He returned in time to take part in the conclusive phase of the resistance and in the Milan uprising.

The writer Primo Levi was a member of the Action Party partisan group in Aosta Valley. He was captured by fascist forces in 1943, handed over to the Germans in 1944, and deported to Auschwitz III (Monowitz).

Giustizia e Libertà brigades were regarded as professional military units, which drew fighters from every social class. In the twenty months of the war, their units sustained 4,500 overall casualties, among them the greater portion of their leaders.

== See also ==
- Giustizia e Libertà, publication of the group
- Liberalism and radicalism in Italy
- Liberal socialism
- Rovetta massacre
- International Brigades

== Bibliography ==
- Historical Dictionary entry from Paravia Mondadori Editori, an Italian Educational publishing house
- Mario Giovana, Giustizia e Libertà in Italia. Storia di una cospirazione antifascista, 1929-1937, Torino, Bollati Boringhieri, 2005.
