= Maximalist Italian Socialist Party =

Maximalist Italian Socialist Party Partito Socialista Italiano Massimalista
- Abbreviation: PSIm
- Secretary: Angelica Balabanoff; Dino Mariani (effective since 1936)
- Founded: 16 March 1930
- Dissolved: 1940s
- Split from: Italian Socialist Party
- Merged into: Italian Socialist Party; Italian Communist Party; Italian Democratic Socialist Party
- Headquarters: Paris
- Ideology: Orthodox Marxism; Revolutionary socialism Maximalism; Anti-fascism; Anti-Stalinism
- Political position: Left-wing
- International affiliation: International Revolutionary Marxist Centre (from 1933)

The Maximalist Italian Socialist Party (Italian: Partito Socialista Italiano Massimalista) or PSIm, was the residual part of the Italian Socialist Party in exile following the split that occurred during the first phases of the Socialist Convention of Grenoble, held on 16 March 1930, by Pietro Nenni and the fusionist fraction.

== History ==
=== Signs of conflicts among the PSI ===
==== Socialists in exile ====
On 9 November 1926, after the Chamber of Deputies and the Senate voted for the removal of 120 opposition deputies, police closed the headquarters of anti-fascist parties and organizations. The direction of PSI was dissolved, transferring its powers to some managers living abroad and in contact with the socialist secretary Olindo Vernocchi from Rome, while sections ceased to communicate with each other. Remaining parts of the socialist organization were integrated in the Italian federations located in France, Switzerland, Austria, Belgium and Americas.

The new direction of PSI was formed by the maximalist majority emerged during the 19th Congress of PSI in Rome of 1922, when the reformist faction was expelled. Ugo Coccia was elected as the political secretary while Giorgio Salvi was the deputy political and administrative secretary. On 10 December 1926 Avanti! became a weekly newspaper, reduced to a minimal format and with Ugo Coccia as editor-in-chief.

Leaders decided to keep the party alive «with its physiognomy, tactics and programme», recommending to cease every trending activity and to act «in favour of comrades affected by the fascist terror». Regarding the struggle against fascism, the party declared its will to operate «along with other parties active on the field of class conflict».

=== End of parties and first hypothesis of socialist unity ===
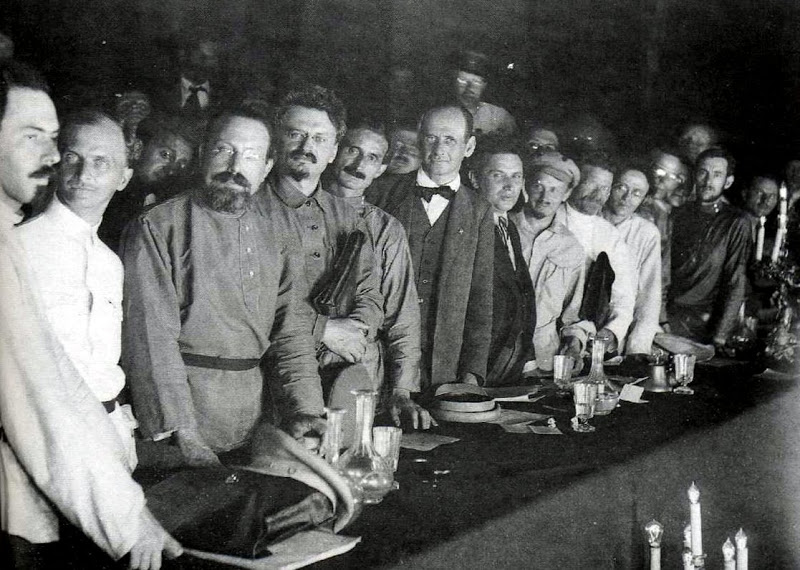
Delegates of the 2nd World Congress of the Comintern. Leon Trotsky is the third from the left, while in front of him there is Giacinto Menotti Serrati, supporter of the merger of PSI with PCd'I. Furthermore, Alfred Rosmer (France), Paul Levi (Germany), Grigory Zinoviev, Nikolai Bukharin and Mikhail Kalinin can also be found. Moscow, 1920.

The first party to be dissolved by the Fascist Regime was the Unitary Socialist Party (PSU) on 6 November 1925, founded on 5 October 1922, a day after the 19th Congress of the Italian Socialist Party. After this event, the co-director of Avanti! Pietro Nenni proposed to make way for reformists within the party, recalling Claudio Treves in Avanti! and rebuilding the unity between all socialists. The direction, with the exception of Giuseppe Romita, refused the proposal of Nenni, who left Avanti! and the PSI executive on 17 December 1925 and founded the journal Quarto Stato with Carlo Rosselli.

However, Pietro Nenni was not in favour of a fusion with the Communist Party of Italy (PCd'I): in January 1923, he wrote an article on Avanti! entitled La liquidazione del Partito Socialista? ("Is this the liquidation of the Socialist Party?") where he considered the merger as a liquidation at loss of PSI. In the same edition of the newspaper, Giacinto Menotti Serrati, supporter of Comintern and director in charge of Avanti!, published an article exalting to the fusion between PSI and PCd'I. An anti-merger movement was formed in Milan on 14 January 1923 within the National Committee of Socialist Defence (Comitato Nazionale di Difesa Socialista), which occupied the headquarter of Avanti! and elected Tito Oro Nobili as the parliamentary leader, replacing the fusionist Francesco Buffoni. However, the fusionist group founded the National Unionist Committee (Comitato Nazionale Unionista).

PSI was then divided between autonomist and fusionist maximalists and a congress was convened for the 14 November 1926 to discuss about the merger. During that, three points were discussed:

- The first one, known as Socialist Defence (Difesa Socialista), was the expression of the maximalist majority (Vella, Vernocchi, Momigliano, Nobili and others) against the merger with PSU but divided on the proposal of joining the International Working Union of Socialist Parties – the future London Bureau formed in 1926 with the Russian revolutionary maximalist Angelica Balabanoff as secretary;
- The second one, called Socialist Action (Azione socialista) and supported by Bacci, Mazzali, Morigi and Valeri, was in favour of the unification but on leftist intransigent positions;
- The third one, headed by the Committee for Socialist Unity within PSI (Comitato per l’unità socialista nel PSI) and supported by Nenni, Romita, Amedeo, Schiavi and Viotto, was strongly unitary with the PSU.

There was also a fourth position, called thirdinternationalist (terzinternazionalista) and supported by Lazzari, Mancini and Clerici, which was in favour of joining the Communist International without presenting any motions but converging its votes on the maximalist motion. This dialectic, derived from the traditional libertarian soul of the party, was completely inconclusive and inadequate to face with determination the contemporary political situation, characterized by freedom-destroying provisions that confirmed the establishment of the fascist regime with the end of syndical freedoms, the illegality of strike proclamation and the suppression of elective communal councils, replaced by mayors appointed by the government. In the meantime, the congress was not organized and the debate regarding the fusion did not produce any result.

A call to the proletarian unity against fascism was addressed by PSI to Unitarian socialists, communists, republicans and anarchists on the Avanti! of 27 February 1927, hoping for «the formation of a strong beam of the working class to oppose against the beam of the bourgeoisie in power in Italy». The Communist Party of Italy refused the proposal, denouncing the maximalist appeal as «a miserable move of the party», while the Unitary Socialist Party (PSULI) invited maximalist socialists to join the Antifascist Action Concentration (Concentrazione d’Azione Antifascista). Maximalists accepted hoping that the Concentration would welcome also the communists.

==== Agreement between anti-fascist forces ====
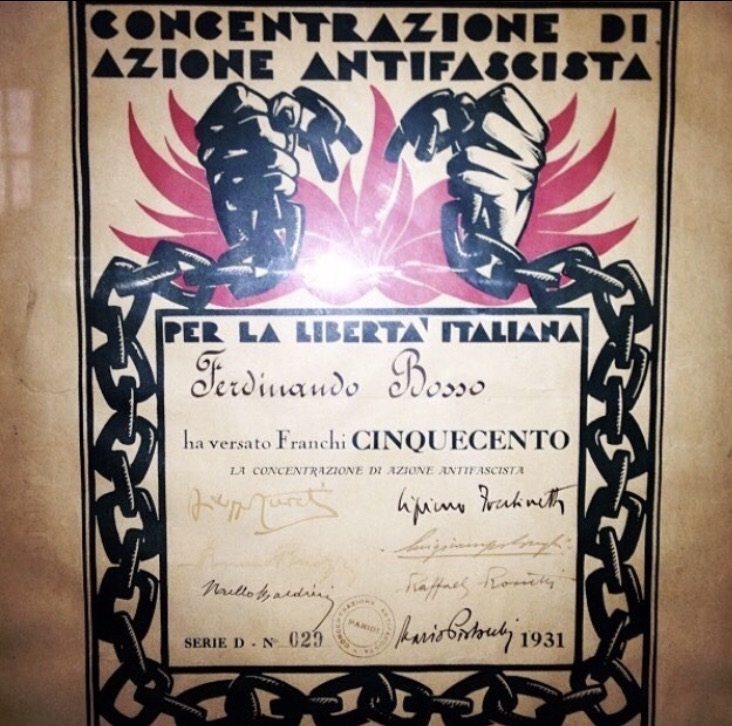
Badge of a CAI member, 1931.

On 27 March 1927, the Italian Anti-Fascist Concentration (Concentrazione Antifascista Italiana, CAI) was formed in Paris and made a public appeal signed by Claudio Treves and Giuseppe Emanuele Modigliani (PSLI), Pietro Nenni and Angelica Balabanoff (PSI), Fernando Schiavetti and Mario Pistocchi (Italian Republican Party), Bruno Buozzi and Felice Quaglino (CGdL) and by Alceste De Ambris (Italian League for Human Rights, Lega italiana dei diritti dell'uomo, LIDU). The purpose of CAI was the organization of Italian antifascist forces to reorganize the anti-fascist movement abroad avoiding to repeat the old divisions existing in Italy before the establishment of the regime. Communists remained outside along with liberals, populars and others to keep contact with Italian masses «in their social defence and political resistance moves». The official weekly newspaper La Libertà was created on 1 May 1927 with Claudio Treves as director.

Due to the divisions among the members, CAI showed poor accomplishing skills since its first actions: it obtained success defending the emigrates in France, urging the intervention of LIDU in the assistance to the victims (including communists) of police provisions. But the work of CAI was insignificant in Italy and for this reason republicans and leftists in particular kept their distances from it without leaving the organization. The leading group authority of PSLI weighed on CAI and imposed itself as the mediator of financial contributions granted by the Labour and Socialist International, of which it was member. Moreover, this circumstance fuelled the left opposition within the PSI, which had its strengths in the sections of Vienne and Paris, where a third formation was formed in favour of the entry of socialists into the Antifascist Proletarian Committees (Comitati Proletari Antifascisti), organized by PCd'I. Socialist left founded Il nostro Avanti ("Our Avanti") in Paris, a newspaper that antifascists called Il piccolo Avanti ("The Little Avanti").

=== Towards the split ===
==== Convention of Marseille ====
Contrasts about the fusion sharpened at the end of 1927. The area led by Angelica Balabanoff tried to rebut the fusionist moves of Nenni with an expedient: a political line change and a merger with socialist reformist PSULI had to be confirmed by a formal congress held in Italy, not by an emigrated representation of PSI. In the meantime, the socialist Direction declared a convention for 15 January 1928 in Marseille to clarify the PSI relations with PSLI and LSI. Balabanova did not participate to this convention, because she was in Sweden as a member of the secretary office of the International Information Bureau of Revolutionary Socialist Parties. Also Nenni did not attend because he thought that «It could be useless to participate to a convention where we can not discuss, until it would possible in Italy». The debate, joined by 30 delegates, overcame the claim of the Direction to limit the discussion to the only organizational field; all the participants, maximalists, fusionist o thirdinternationalists in favour of a united front with communists, wanted to discuss and deliberate, so that some motions were proposed by the Committee of Defence (maximalist), Filippo Amedeo (fusionist) while others were voted in the different federations, including those of London and Zurich.

The convention ended with a majority vote which sanctioned the attitude of the Direction but recommended «the unity of purposes and action of the whole Party for the struggle that comrades of Italy conduct against the fascist dictatorship» and gave a mandate «to the Party Direction to hit with an inflexible energy comrades, sections and federations that not observe with loyal discipline to the duties traced by the Convention». Furthermore, all the members of the assembly admitted the impossibility to keep alive a party organization in Italy.

Those results were negatively received by who was openly in favour to the fusion with PSLI. The PSI Direction convened on 19 February 1928 and elected Angelica Balabanoff as new political secretary, along with an executive committee formed by Giorgio Salvi, Giovanni Bordini, Siro Burgassi and Ugo Coccia, who would flank Pietro Nenni in the executive of the Antifascist Concentration. The Direction assumed three new members: left maximalist Carlo Marchisio, manager of the Lyon section, fusionist Filippo Amedeo, former syndicalist and deputy of Turin, and maximalist Franco Clerici, already member of PSI Direction in 1921.

==== Appeal to the revolutionary unity ====
An important symbol of Italian anti-fascism: the flag of Arditi del Popolo.

Those events were not appreciated by socialists who were convinced about the necessity to strengthen the LSI. Among them there was the Grand Orient of Paris: according to a confidential communication of the Italian Ministry of the Interior, it deliberated to push on socialist leaders to achieve the fusion of the two parties «generally not belonging to Masonry», of whose support «they need every day for work purposes and political protection». The intervention of the Grand Orient, which had a great influence in the French political life, was probably defined by factors of international politics like threatens of crises that Benito Mussolini alluded during a speech of 5 June 1927.

In February 1928, PSI direction renewed the leading bodies and deliberated a manifest as an appeal to the unity of revolutionary left in which «the two great illusions maturated during the war with the proletariat were attacked: the collaborationist illusion and the Bolshevik one», expecting the liquidation of the two working class internationals (LSI and Comintern) and aiming to recreate the international proletarian unity achieved before WWI. Adversaries to the appeal moved resolutely to action starting to push on hesitants. Nenni, along with Amedeo Clerici from Vienna and Ugo Coccia, openly criticized the Direction. Coccia left the direction of Avanti! when the Authority Direction declared closed every discussion about the fusion with reformists, and he was replaced on 12 August 1928 by the political secretary Angelica Balabanoff herself. On 3 February 1929, Balabanoff wrote on the socialist newspaper:

The Party is intangible.[...] If there are subscribers who no longer have faith in the revolutionary class struggle, who consider good the reformist method, who still have the illusion of being able to do socialism in the International of war, who approve the collaborationist methods and the disgraceful democratic utopias, let them go with reformists: they will stay where they belong. [...] As a revolutionary party, PSI remains and will remain the Party of the revolution of Italian proletariat.[...]

— Angelica Balabanoff

The autonomist majority imposed the ceasing of the debate on socialist unity and took disciplinary actions after rebellions among federal conventions. The controversy within PSI became unstoppable and spread also outside the French borders, in particular among the Italian Socialist Federation of Switzerland which was publishing in Zurich L'Avvenire dei lavoratori ("The Future of Workers"), supporter at the time of pro-merger positions. Nenni was alleged to be approached by a «person sent specially from Italy» who propose to him a return in exchange for a charge among fascist labour unions. Fascist OVRA police took advantage from this situation and infiltrated some agents in the PSI section of Paris.

Another cause of conflicts within the party was the role of the Concentration: Balabanoff accused reformists (who were holding the power inside the association as well as the LSI funds) to keep it inert. She aimed to a more wide unitary solution, within the framework of a political line of the unity of all the proletarian movement but without breaking up with the Concentration.

==== Convention of Grenoble and the fusionist split ====
Fusionists then formed the Committee for Socialist Unity (Comitato per l'unità socialista) and Nenni asked moreover for a regular congress to be held. The direction, under the protests of opponents who objected the threaten of an auto-convocation by rebel federations, postponed a convention about organizational problems initially scheduled for 6 January 1930. However, the direction expelled 58 militants. On 16 March, two different meetings were held in Grenoble among tensions:

- The fusionist group, headed by Coccia and Nenni, debated until the morning of 17 March and elected a direction formed by Antonio Bianchi, Franco Clerici, Ugo Coccia, Mario Gabici and Pietro Nenni, appointed as secretary and director of L’Avvenire dei Lavoratori of Zurich
- The maximalist autonomist group, led by Angelica Balabanoff, elected a new direction formed by Sigfrido Ciccotti, Carlo Marchisio, Oreste Mombello, Pietro Refolo, Giorgio Salvi (deputy secretary and administrative secretary) and Gino Tempia. Autonomists confirmed Balabanoff as political secretary and nominated the "fiduciary directionals" of the Federations, formed by convinced workers, and intensified the relations with socialists in Latin America.

Both factions claimed to have the majority in the party, obtained actually by fusionists in Zurich, London and Marseille, while the left claimed to have the three-quarters of subscribers to PSI. During a reunion, fusionist ascertained that the direction did not want to revoke the expulsion measures (rejecting also their motion) and they decided to not participate to the Convention held in the local Bourse du Travail. Another split of PSI happened when a group of maximalist terzini visited the two political assemblies announcing their adhesion to the Communist Party of Italy.

==== Dispute on Avanti! and the name of the party ====
Pietro Nenni, deputy secretary and editor-in-chief of L'Avvenire dei lavoratori of Zurich, renamed his newspaper to Avanti! on 22 March 1930, forcing then Angelica Balabanoff and his party to make appeal to justice: the court annulled the renaming and conceded the rights of Avanti! to the maximalists, who would publish the newspaper until 1 May 1940. In 1934, Nenni tried again to take the Avanti! in Paris, but the local court impeded him and his newspaper was later renamed to Nuovo Avanti ("New Avanti", without the exclamation mark). Another dispute regarded the old abbreviation of PSI, because on the socialist cards released in exile by the fraction of Pietro Nenni, from 1931 until the creation of the first Italian Socialist Party of Proletarian Unity, had the wording Partito Socialista Italiano-Sezione dell'Internazionale operaia socialista (or PSI-IOS, literally "Italian Socialist Party – Section of Labour Socialist International"). While the cards released by maximalist socialists (who legally held the rights on the old name) had the simple abbreviation Partito Socialista Italiano, modern historians add the adjective "massimalista" ("maximalist") to it. Those circumstances suggest the Balabanoff area was the majoritarian one.

=== Looking for a political line ===
==== Exit from Concentration and General Confederation of Labour ====
Under the hegemony of internal left, PSIm quitted the Concentration, claiming that it was not the ideal place for "authentic revolutionary" forces. Moreover, the party decided to leave the reformist General Confederation of Labour led by Bruno Buozzi, who wanted to join the Sindacati Rossi ("Red Unions") formed by the communists.

Meanwhile, the fusionist fraction of Nenni managed the confluence into the new party, during a congress known as the 21st Congress or Congresso dell’Unità ("Congress of Unity") held in the House of French Socialists between 19 and 20 July 1930 in Paris. Among the representatives of various foreign socialist parties, there were 47 delegates representing 1017 members for fusionist maximalists and other 50, representing 811 former members of PSULI. Nenni, along with Giuseppe Saragat, performed an operation intended to liquidate reformism and maximalism in favour of the establishment of a «rigorously Marxist and democratic socialism, adopting the class struggle as instrument and the liberation of humanity from every economical and political serfdom as purpose». The party was then affiliated with the Labour Socialist International, and the name chosen for the unified party was Partito Socialista Italiano-Sezione dell’Internazionale operaia socialista.

In 1931, due to internal divergences, Nenni distanced himself from the party of Guido Salvi, deputy political secretary of PSIm as well as administrative secretary and owner of the Avanti!. The newspaper administrator Giuseppe Andrich resigned too, while Avanti! and the party were in serious economical troubles. In a climate of attacks from PCd'I when it was carrying out the political line of "social fascism", the third General Convention of the Italian (Maximalist) Socialist Party was hold abroad in Lyon on 27 and 28 March 1932.

==== Between the ideological and political identity of the United Front ====
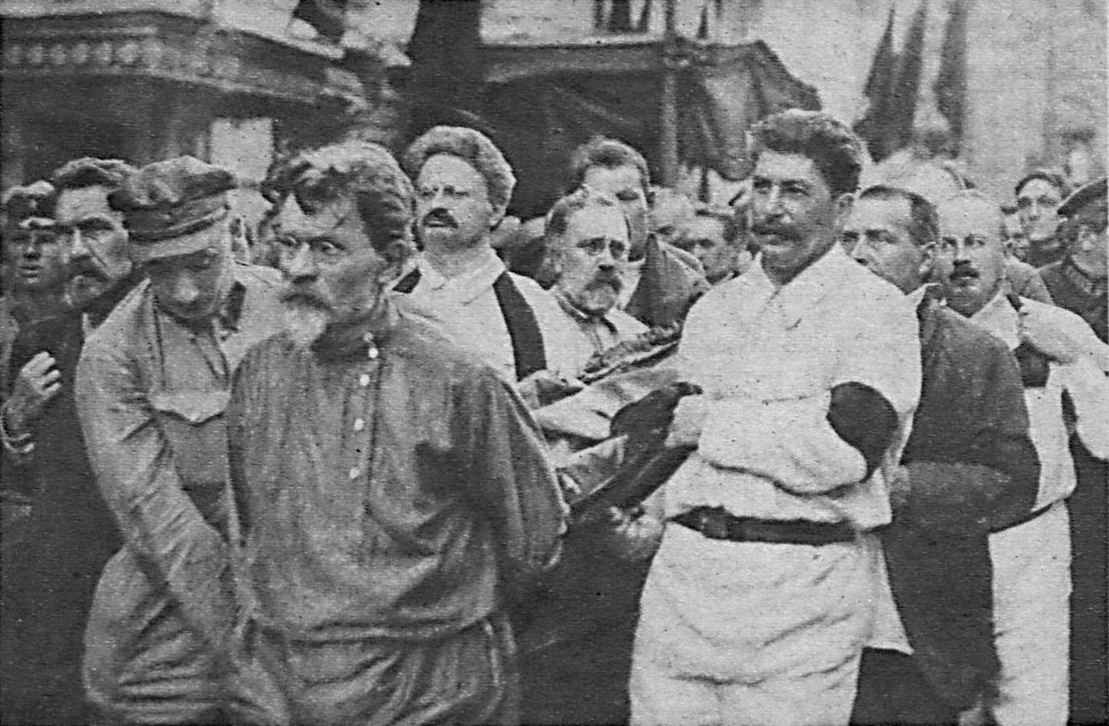
The last common appearance of the old guard of Bolshevik Party during the funerals of Felix Dzerzhinsky on 30 April 1926. Between Kalinin, Kamenev, Tomsky and Bukharin, there are Joseph Stalin and Leon Trotsky.

About sixty delegates took part to the PSIm Lyon convention, debating on the anti-fascist struggle and the relations with other organizations abroad. The exit from the Italian League for Human Rights was approved, confirming the leave from CGdL, while the join to Red Unions was proposed but rejected by the majority of delegates, who approved instead the participation of PSIm to a united front with communists. In 1932, after the death of Turati and Coccia, Nenni and Saragat reinforced their role within the PSI-LSI. In a turbulent international situation, communists were talking about a "world revolution" while socialists (including PSIm) were attracted by the opposition to Stalin of Leon Trotsky. Meanwhile, the rise to power of the National Socialist German Workers’ Party pushed Italian communists to begin negotiations with other leftists parties to create a consultative committee regarding actions to be performed in Italy and abroad.

A few days later, the 22nd Congress of PSI-LSI was held in Marseille on 17–18 April 1933. An invitation was addressed to PSIm for the reconstruction of the socialist unity among the LSI, while the proletarian one with communists was complained, but refusing the Bolshevik notion of power which would have dictatorship and terrorism as main fatal consequences.

On 4 and 5 June 1933, during the 4th convention of PSIm, the Direction identified as the main causes of the victory of fascism and nazism not only the misunderstanding of the two phenomena by Second and Third International, but also the paralysis provoked by disagreements and fratricidal fights within the action of masses which destroyed the faith in the future revolution. The convention tried to stimulate comrades by creating positive statements and reporting the successes obtained in the struggles to perform syndicalist and class unity among Italian emigrates, and giving themselves the merit to have associated the parties adhering to the Cominform with a call for unity addressed to the two Internationals.

An intermediate movement was formed among the Direction and it considered the creation of a sincere and effective agreement of proletarian organizations as the main task of the party, to give back to masses the faith in the future revolution and the necessary force to oppose the imperialism and transform the capitalist society into a socialist one. It was recommended the abstention from everything could break the new contacts established among members of the different proletarian movements, evidencing the need to denounce to the proletarian public opinion all whose activities that aimed to the establishment of the supremacy at the expense of the other. The debate focused mainly on the relations with PCd'I and the creation of a united front with communists, a proposal which would be later approved. Balabanoff was confirmed as secretary and director of Avanti!, with Dino Mariani as deputy secretary.

Despite the LSI was considered by the maximalist PSI as "the International of war and collaborationist reformism, den of social chauvinists", this kind of collaborative "elasticity" or spirit of understanding towards the London Bureau was a surprise. While Leon Trotsky accused the merger of Spanish right and communist left into the POUM as a "surrender to centrism", Italian maximalists considered it as a clear example of "reconstitution of the proletarian unity".

==== Socialist left conferences ====
On 19 June 1933, while Adolf Hitler was conquering the power in Weimar Republic, a World Conference was held in Brussels with all the proletarian organizations not affiliated with Comintern nor Labour Socialist International. During that conference, a permanent committee was formed and Angelica Balabanoff declared:

The reformist socialism as conceived by Nenni and his comrades is a complete failure. Only the unity of all proletarians can hinder a further expansion of fascist movements!

— Angelica Balabanoff

The representatives of 14 marxists held a Conference in Paris between 27 and 28 August of the same year, and three different sides faced each other in that occasion:

- The one belonging to the Labour Party of Norway and French Proletarian Unity Party (PUP) which was collocated in the tradition of Vienna International and claimed that every common action with the Communist International was impracticable. This side was also in favour to the reunification of the proletarian movement through the social democracy.
- An intermediate position, defended also by the British Independent Labour Party, which aimed to a future alliance with Comintern.
- While other organizations – including PSIm – considered failed the reformist LSI and the Comintern controlled by USSR. However, members of this faction had various lines of thought: the most extreme ones were deduced by Socialist Workers' Party of Germany, Dutch Independent Socialist Party and Revolutionary Socialist Party, as well as by the Left Opposition, which signed a manifest (known as the "Declaration of Four") in favour of a new Workers' International and the foundation of new communist parties. While acknowledging the failure of the two main international political forces of the proletarian movement, the Swedish Communist Party, the Spanish Federación Comunista and the Independent Labour Socialist Party (NSPP) of Poland refused to participate to a new international.

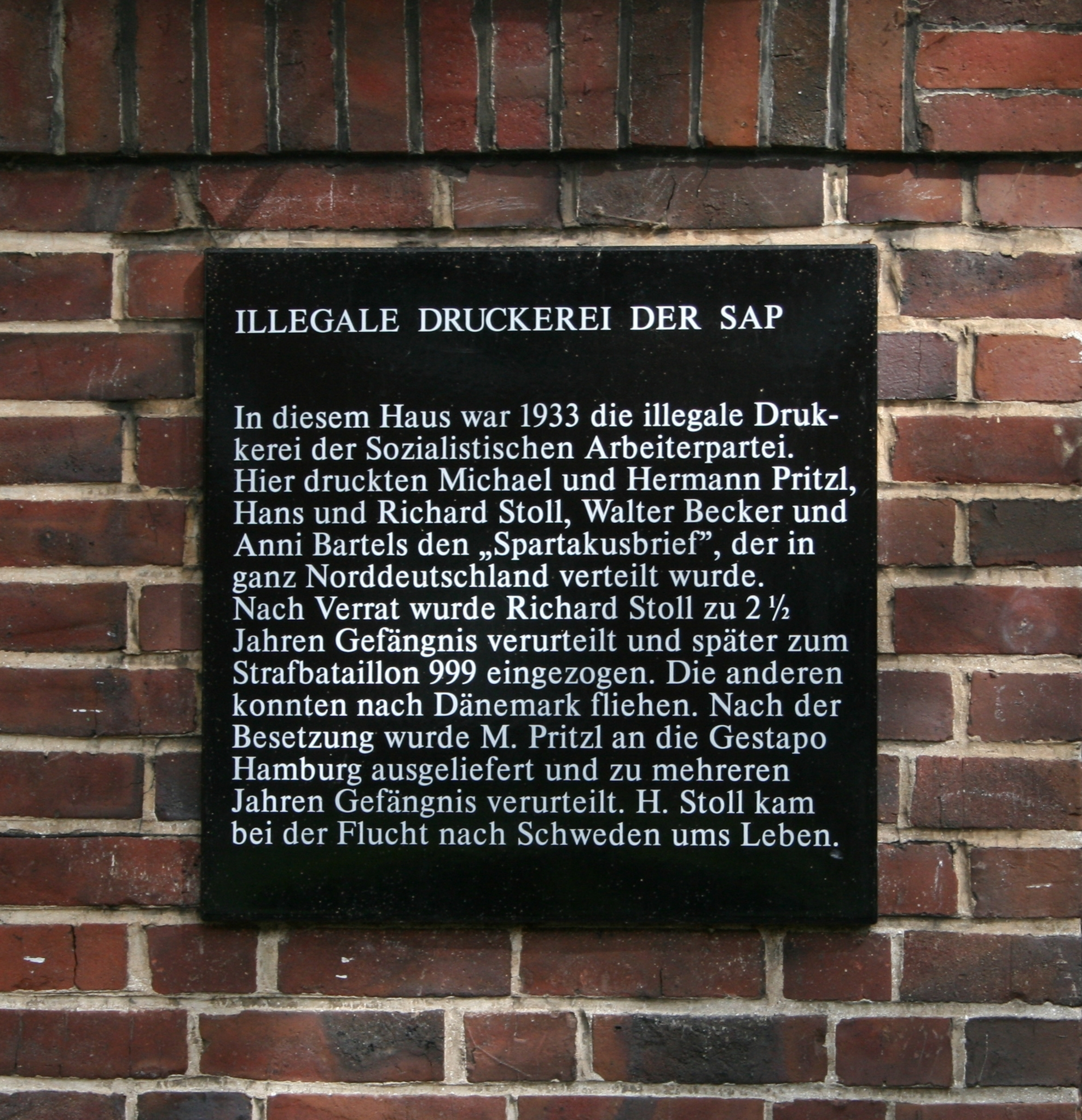
Commemorative plate of the illegal typography of the Workers' Socialist Party of Germany, co-signer party of the Declaration of Four.

Among the poor results of the Paris Conference, there were the proposal of boycotting Germany and holding a world congress «representing all the workers' organizations of the world that accept the need of struggle to realize socialism as a basis». Due to the heterogeneity of point of views of the participants to the conference, no common decision could be adopted about the new International. During the Conference, communists were criticized about the United Front and the committees against war, while the participation of PSIm annoyed PCd'I. Later, a policy of rapprochement to reformists provoked an internal controversy and various federations and sections intervened, forcing the Direction to gather to answers to the communist direction and the United Front Committee Against Fascism and War. In this occasion, the PSIm was allowed to criticize the mistakes committed by the two International and it could contact the other political organizations to achieve the syndical union. PSIm was also allowed to invite Trotskyists and other proletarian political tendencies to the debate.

==== Message to comrades of Italy ====
Since the elections of 1933 in the Second Spanish Republic, with the rise of the Spanish Confederation of Autonomous Rights (CEDA) and the establishment of a government coalition with radicals within the cabinet of Alejandro Lerroux, revolts led by anarchic syndicates blew up throughout the country and provoked the general strike organized by left labour unions on 5 October 1934, causing revolutionary popular motions in Asturias. These events convinced Angelica Balabanoff about the coming of the ideal time to reprise contact with socialists in Italy. A committee formed by Dino Mariani and the political secretary tried to send an invitation to trustees living in Italy and the secretaries of sections abroad. The message was formed by seven pages divided into two documents and stated that:

- Fascism managed «to spiritually pulverize masses, scare them, disorient them and to lead them towards indifference and wide passivity»
- «The action of the Party should set the goal of arousing, first of all, a mass movement around immediate claim through a work to be done among the “Fascist institutions of labour”»
- The general criteria assigned to the socialist action consisted in «the creation of a dynamism having masses as the subject or which can directly give that attitude to them”: as a mean, the party should be organized into groups “of revolutionary avant-garde”»
- The party should be warned about “intransigentists” and “visionary activists” (who aimed to a general strike and an armed insurrection, considering unstable the fascist regime) as well as those who were waiting for operate «sufficient enlargement in the meshes of the dictatorship»

The second part of the letter indicated the themes of propaganda to promote, drawing the attention of activists to the active movement among the fascist youth, who «takes seriously the devilries of the fascist arsenal and believes in the anti-capitalistic function of corporations». The letter ensured Italian socialists that the PSI Direction did not want to impose any political and tactical directives to the Italian groups, nor a dictatorial organization control. Furthermore, it stated that the programme had to be reworked according to the needs that would be revealed with the development of the movement in Italy.

==== Convention of Saint-Ouen ====
Meanwhile, PSIm held its General Convention in Paris between 30 and 31 December 1934. It was attended by 52 delegates and Dino Mariani introduced the debate with an article published on Avanti! of 30 December, the opening day of the assembly. Mariani accused the division among the labour and socialist movement provoked by right and left sections, between social democratic and communist leaders, for the victories achieved by the fascist reaction in Italy and elsewhere. He talked then about the need to unite the working class in both the syndical and political field. Mariani also condemned the refusal to the PSIm question to be admitted to the Unity of Action Pact, and he invited comrades to insist in asking for the proletarian unity based «on clear principles». The motion summarizing the works included a courageous defence of the Russian Revolution, but at the same time it included also a severe criticism towards the ant-unitary behaviour of Comintern leaders, and concluded indicating the points of the programme that the Party established for the immediate future.

An idea of a new relation with communists made instead its way through the cadres of PSIm since the Marseille Congress of 1933. This re-approaching process between PSI-LSI and PCd'I culminated into the Unity of Action Pact signed on 17 August 1934, although PSIm was excluded. Pietro Nenni and Giuseppe Saragat signed for socialists, but the ideas of Saragat regarding communists were preserved at the ideological level but outdated at the political one; the joint struggle against the common fascist enemy was considered instead as an absolute priority. That happened while actions of the United Front did not seem to proceed well, given that there were resistances against the joint action among the Labour Socialist International. According to Nenni, only the collaboration on the syndical level could be possible; while communists stated that «the PSI-LSI was invited to a self-criticism for the wrong behaviour towards the allies».

=== Hypothesis of the new Labour International ===
==== Conference of Paris ====
In February 1935, a conference was held in Paris by left socialists among the London Bureau and two different political sides clashed: one wanted to «work for the unity of working class», while another one aimed to engage «for the revolutionary unit of the working class, which it would not be realized between the two existing internationals – LSI and Comintern, considered as a failure», and asked for the establishment of a new international body.

The unity of parties signatory of the «Declaration of Four» in June 1933 (proclaiming «the establishment of a new proletarian International and new communist parties»), was however deteriorated: since the beginning, the SAPD and the Dutch Independent Socialist Party voted in favour of the "resolution on the reconstruction of the world labour movement", without advancing the prospective of a new proletarian International and consequently keeping their affiliation to the Internationale Arbeitsgemeinschaft (IAG), a body of the London Bureau considered "centrist" by Left Opposition. Furthermore, there were divergences between SAP and the Trotskyist movement about how a new International had to be created: according to SAP, this should happen through a long process of maturation of labour movement avant-garde; while Trotskyist stated that it was necessary to immediately select an avant-garde at world level according to a very precise programme, explaining the need of this kind of construction work.

During the Conference, the debate about a new International divided the PSIm, with a part of its Direction around Balabanoff in favour of it and a group around Dino Mariani against. However, the party joined the proposal presented by SAP that expected a long period of fascism rule in Germany and Italy and a mass orientation to left-wing, advising also to «facilitate, help social democratic left movements» in Germany and Austria, urging to defend the democratic freedoms and developing an active police in the other countries.

==== Policies of Popular Fronts ====
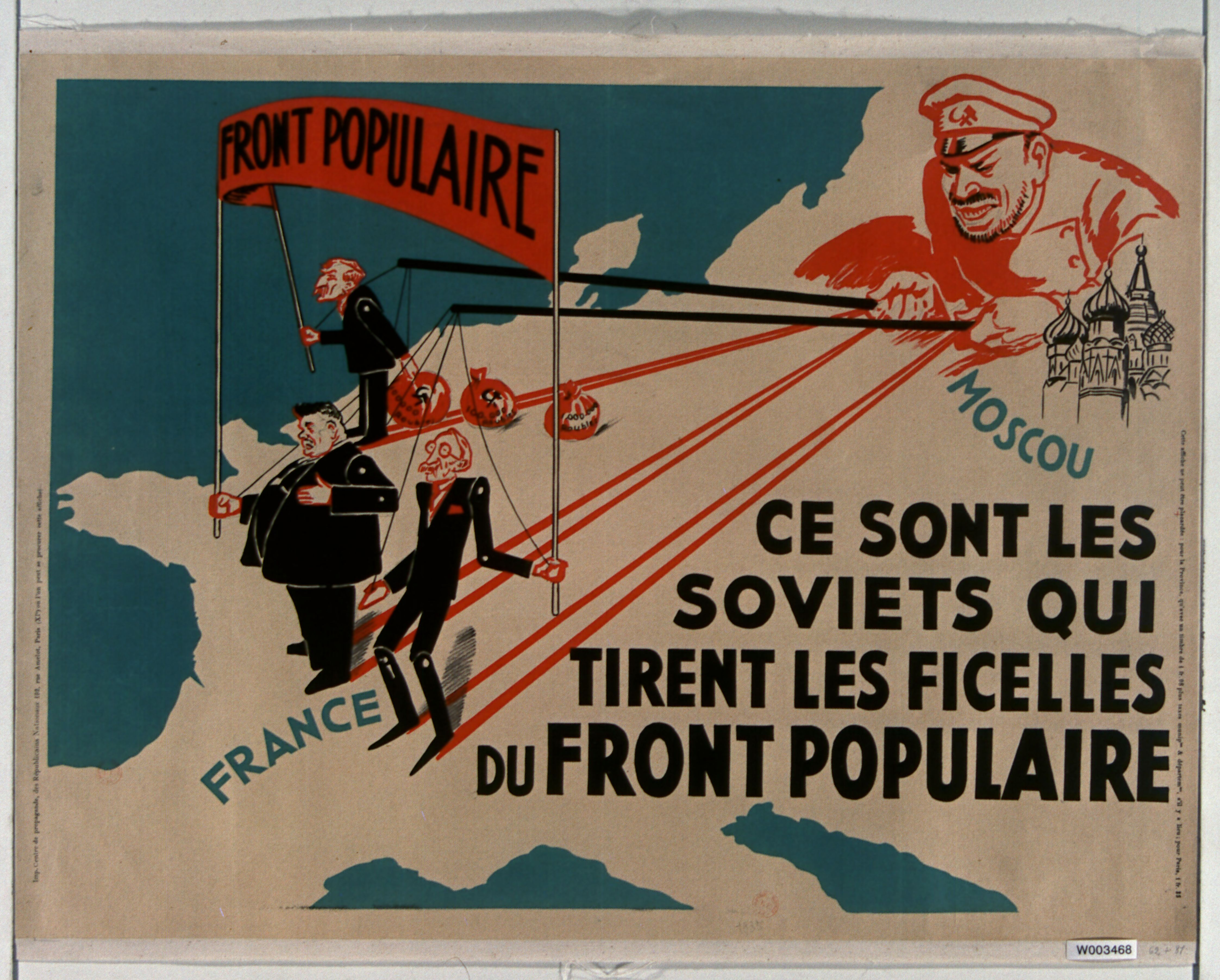
"Soviets are the ones who pull the threads of the Popular Front"; manifest of Independent Republicans for French elections of 1936.

In July 1935, at the same time of the "frontist" turn of Comintern during its 7th Congress (25 July – 20 August 1935), French Communist Party and Section of the Workers' International formed the Popular Front along with other smaller French left-wing groups, inaugurating the political line of Popular fronts followed also by SAP in Germany during the same period.

The PSIm group of Dino Mariani accepted the invitation by Communist Party of Italy and PSI-LSI to join the Congress of Italians abroad, while a group of PSIm militants solicited for a merger with PSI-LSI.

The PSI-LSI Direction convened in Paris on 14 and 15 July 1935 and approved the motion in favour of the «realization of one of the main goals of workers: one Party, one syndical organization, one International», in order to support the quest of peace and, in case of an attack against the Soviet Union, to «defend Russia without any kind of compromises with any imperialism». A common manifest was stipulated with communists «to turn the war towards the defeat of fascism and the victory of popular revolution, for a socialist Italy».

Among PSI-LSI, resistances against the Unity of Action Pact with PCd'I arose: Pietro Tresso and Nicola Di Bartolomeo, exponents of New Italian Opposition (Nuova Opposizione Italiana, NOI), stated that «the Popular Front would lead to the capitulation in Stalin's hands», considering «the constitution of a Fourth International as necessary». Meanwhile, Leon Trotsky inaugurated his new entrist tactic to «conquer and transform them into "marxist revolutionary parties" – or destroy them» (referring to parties considered as "centrists" by him), expecting a long battle during that it was necessary to clarify and sharpen contradictions among those parties for an internal differentiation.

The NOI, founded as an opposition group within PCd'I against the political line dictated by the party following the turn of so-called Third Period, was expelled by the Central Committee of 9 June 1930 which accused the opposition of «contacting Trotskyists, conducting a slanderous campaign against the party and having a "wrong evaluation of the prospectives of the fascist regime"». NOI then became the Italian section of the International Left Opposition and subsequently joined PSI-LSI.

The debate within PSIm about the need of a new proletarian International saw the group of Balabanoff in favour of the Trotskyist proposal, and due to that the party accepted two meetings with dissident NOI exponents of PSI-LSI organized in September 1935.

==== Agreement Committee with communist left ====
A meeting was held in Brussels at the end of October 1935 between Alessandro Consani for PSIm and the leaders of Left Fraction of PCd'I, followed by a meeting held on 5 November by Consani, Dino Mariani, Nicola Di Bartolomeo and other Trotskyist exponents for their admission to the party. Another meeting was held five days later, with the participation of Trotskyist Mario Bavassano, and the formation of an Agreement Committee (Comitato d’Intesa) was approved, pushing on Pietro Tresso, Alfonso Leonetti, Paolo Ravazzoli and other NOI leader to make them join to PSIm.

The Party Direction, considering the leave of Balabanoff to the United States, redistributed the charges: international relations were entrusted to Balabanoff and Giuseppe Andrich, relations with not French federations to Santo Semeraro, communications with the United Front to Siro Burgassi, while Dino Mariani became the effective secretary replacing Angelica Balabanoff.

Meanwhile, a polemic was provoked towards Dino Mariani by Alessandro Consani, a maximalist leader who would be later revealed as an agent provocateur and spy for Fascist OVRA, and Mariani resigned from most of his charges, being aware of his limits and his absolute dedication to the cause that he did not want to hinder.

=== Armed representation during the Spanish Civil War ===
==== Victories of lefts in Spain and coup d'etat ====
Flag of the Popular Front.

The 1936 Spanish general election was won by the Popular Front (Frente Popular) with 4,176,156 votes and 276 deputies, against 3,783,601 votes of the Counter-revolutionary National Front with 132 deputies. Since the first days after the victory of the Popular Front, peasants began to occupy the lands of their owners, and left activists started to request the amnesty for prisoners among the cities. In Oviedo, jails were opened and detainees freed. These events gave hopes among exiled antifascists who thought about how to act in Italy.

However, a group of officers tried to overtake the Popular Front government with a military coup. The uprising became active between 17 and 18 July 1936, and also if the rebellion had to be a "quick coup d'état", the republican government was able to maintain the control over most of the country. Fascist Italy of Mussolini and Nazi Germany of Hitler violated the embargo against Spain and sent troops and vehicles to golpists, unleashing a civil war occurred.

==== Maximalist military engagement in POUM ====
With the motto «Oggi in Spagna, domani in Italia!» ("Today in Spain, tomorrow in Italy") launched by Carlo Rosselli, Giustizia e Libertà and the Maximalist Italian Socialist Party gave their support to republicans and addressed an appeal to other anti-fascist parties among Italian emigrates, to make them intervene in the conflict. About thirty maximalist socialists came in Spain to join the Workers' Party of Marxist Unification (Partido Obrero de Unificación Marxista, POUM), the Spanish homologue and political referent of PSIm. Among them there was Giuseppe Bogoni, who settled in Perpignano as a link officer with Aldo Garosci, the organizer of the Italian column armed and trained in Barcelona by Mario Angeloni. Meanwhile, another Italian formation, guided by the militant of the Italian Fraction of Communist Left Enrico Russo, joined to the first international brigade formed in Spain, Columna Internacional Lenin (Lenin International Column), created by POUM for the Aragona front in July 1936.

On 29 July, PSIm Direction sent a solidarity letter to POUM, and Julián Gorkin answered thanking in the name of his party secretary, while the socialist newspaper Avanti! exalted the Spanish revolutionary action. PSIm gave its support to POUM by sending men and funds through Alessandro Consani, despite their financial troubles.

Between 31 October and 2 November 1936, the London Bureau indicted an "International Conference Against War and Fascism" in Brussels, to which PSIm Direction took part, and that was preceded by a meeting between PSIm, POUM, SAP and SFIO revolutionary left (Marceau Pivert, Michel Collinet and Michel Duchesne). PSIm agreed with the proposal of POUM regarding the creation of a new Workers' International, but French were not in favour and concrete decisions were not made. Meanwhile, Avanti! and PSIm defended POUM which was ousted by the Catalan government due to a denounce of "Trotskyism".

=== World War II and dismantle ===
The Maximalist Italian Socialist Party continued its political activity and the publishing of Avanti! (which remained to maximalists) beyond 1940, but it was dismantled after the end of WWII, joining the Italian Socialist Party of Proletarian Unity (Partito Socialista Italiano di Unità Proletaria, PSIUP). Some PSIm exponents preferred to join instead the Italian Communist Party.

Balabanoff later abandoned the maximalist positions and adhered to the Socialist Party of Italian Workers (Partito Socialista dei Lavoratori Italiani, PSLI), which later became the Italian Democratic Socialist Party (Partito Socialista Democratico Italiano, PSDI).

== Ideological profile ==
The historical and ideological base of Maximalist Italian Socialist Party was the maximalist socialism which had controlled the PSI since the 13th Socialist Congress of Reggio Emilia held in July 1912. Considering maximalism as an interpretation of the SPD Erfurt Program and an archaic concept of parties of Second International related to Orthodox Marxism and debates since the first 20th century, along with the rising revisionist movement, the unity of the Italian proletariat movement was undermined by theoretical re-elaborations done since the first years of 1900 by other Marxists, in particular by Lenin, provoking the split up during the 17th Congress of PSI.

From those assumptions, Maximalist PSI characterized itself for a strict ideological intransigence, remaining faithful to the concept of dictatorship of the proletariat but with a different interpretation from whose imposed in the USSR of Stalin. The political rigour of PSIm led Palmiro Togliatti to define the exiled party as a «Trotskyist-POUMist sect of provocateurs». In view of the International Conference Against War and Fascism convened by the London Bureau (31 October – 2 November 1936), PSIm promulgated a resolution of participation whose declaration of principle hoped the Bureau transformation «from a simple connection point to a coordination body», and where the following proposal were postulated resuming the political positions of PSIm:

- The possibility of an ideological change for the better had to be denied to LSI and Comintern, ascertaining their failure;
- PSIm position had to be redefined in relation of the anarchical and trotskyist movement, on the base of experience in Russia and Spain;
- The concept of dictatorship of proletariat should be replaced with that of the "revolutionary power of the proletariat";
- The definition of United Front should be replaced with "revolutionary front";
- The proletarian characteristic of the Soviet Union had to be recognized, even denying the identification of "socialist state" because its labour productivity was less than that of the capitalist society, the revenue distribution gave place to privileged castes and the despotism of Stalinian bureaucracy would suppress every principle of proletarian democracy .

Despite the acts of generosity and anti-fascist coherence done by PSIm toward the Communist Party of Italy and PSI-LSI, the group of Balabanoff remained always firmly critical against these political subjects.

== International affiliation ==
Maximalist PSI was affiliated to the International Revolutionary Marxist Centre (IRMC), also known as London Bureau. This took origin from the experience of Vienna International founded on 27 February 1921 by a series of left socialist parties with the purpose of overcoming the division suffered by the world proletarian movement after the October Revolution and the establishment of Communist International. The experience ended with a failure and, on 10 May 1923, some parties of the Vienna International rejoined reformists of the former Second International and co-founded the Labour Socialist International. Socialist parties that were still faithful to the revolutionary method as the way to socialism, including PSI, formed instead the International Information Bureau of Revolutionary Socialist Parties, the future London Bureau. The IRMC, after being politically near to the trotskyist movement and Left Opposition since the first years of the 1930s, became a meeting point for those parties ideologically belonging to communist left, communist right and left socialism.

So that in August 1933 two different political orientations appeared: one claimed that left socialism should work for the unity of working class, while the other one aimed to the revolutionary unity of the working class, which could not be achieved by the failed policies of the two existing Internationals but only through the creation of a new International. at the beginning of the 1940s, while the Soviet Union did no longer advocate for a world revolution but it was defending only its own national interests, and the reformism had been completely included in the system of bourgeois companies and capitalism, the IRMC and most of its parties suffered due to this situation and the World War II.

== See also ==
- Pietro Nenni
- Angelica Balabanoff
- Italian Socialist Party
- Communist Party of Italy
- Socialism in Italy

== Bibliography ==
- Leonzio, Simone (25 October 2016). "Segretari e leader del socialismo italiano" (PDF). Domani Socialista (in Italian).
- Sacchi, Marco (July 2010). "I socialisti massimalisti nell'emigrazione antifascista". Sotto le bandiere del marxismo (in Italian). Archived from the original on 14 April 2017.
- Balabanoff, Angelica (2013). Jörn Schütrumpf (ed.). Lenin oder: Der Zweck heiligt die Mittel. Berlin: Karl Dietz Verlag Berlin GmbH.
- Togliatti, Palmiro (January–March 2011) [1938]. "La situazione economica e politica del regime fascista. Un inedito del 1938". Studi Storici (in Italian) – via Academia.edu.
- Preston, Paul (2006). The Spanish Civil War: Reaction, Revolution and Revenge (3rd ed.). London: HarperCollins. ISBN 978-0-00-723207-9.
- Michal, Bernard (1971). La guerra di Spagna I. Geneva: Edizioni di Cremille.
- Thomas, Hugh (1963). Storia della guerra civile spagnola. Giulio Einaudi Editore.
