= Benito (film) =

1993 television film directed by Gianluigi Calderone

- Italian: Il Giovane Mussolini
- Spanish: El joven Mussolini
- Written by: Vincenzo Cerami, Mimmo Rafele, Lidia Ravera
- Directed by: Gianluigi Calderone
- Starring: Antonio Banderas, Susanne Lothar, Toni Bertorelli
- Original language: Italian

Production
- Running time: 307 minutes

Original release
- Release: 1993

Benito (Italian: Il Giovane Mussolini), also referred to as Benito - The Rise and Fall of Mussolini in English-speaking countries, is an Italian TV miniseries regarding the story of Benito Mussolini's early rise to power in the Italian Socialist International and his relationship with Angelica Balabanoff. It was made in 1993 by RTVE of Spain, Rai Due of Italy, Microfilm, and the Kirch Company. It stars Antonio Banderas as Mussolini.

== Synopsis ==
Mussolini arrives in a small town in 1901 and gets a job as a school teacher; he is subsequently fired for having sex with the headmaster's daughter. This would be a common theme throughout the movie. After giving up on teaching, he works as a builder on the new University of Geneva campus building, and where a lover persuades him to become a student. This is also where he organizes his first protest after the death of a worker he knew. For this, he is nearly deported but is saved by Angelica's intervention. After getting run out of then-Austro-Hungarian Trieste, he goes back to his hometown of Forlì, where he marries Rachele. Soon he is at the forefront of the Socialist movement when he becomes the editor-in-chief of Avanti!. At this point Mussolini unites the "reds," the Socialists, with the "yellows," the Republicans in an anti-war movement. This marks the peak of his power, with the Italian left-wing politics under his control. However, he gradually loses his anti-war fervor and splits from the Socialist party altogether, turning all his allies into enemies.

== Cast ==
The following starred in the film:

- Antonio Banderas as Benito Mussolini
- Toni Bertorelli as Primo
- Valentina Lainati as Giulia Ferrari
- Ivano Marescotti as Giacinto Menotti Serrati
- Franco Mescolini as Ferrari
- Anna Geislerová as Eleonora
- Claudia Koll as Rachele Guidi
- Susanne Lothar as Angelica Balabanoff
- Luca Zingaretti as Pietro Nenni

== Reception ==
The film was criticised for "romanticising" Mussolini by the British newspaper The Guardian. Banderas however received praise for his portrayal.
