= Filippo Amedeo =

Italian politician

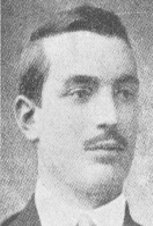

Personal details
- Born: 2 February 1891 Turin
- Died: 18 June 1946 (aged 55)

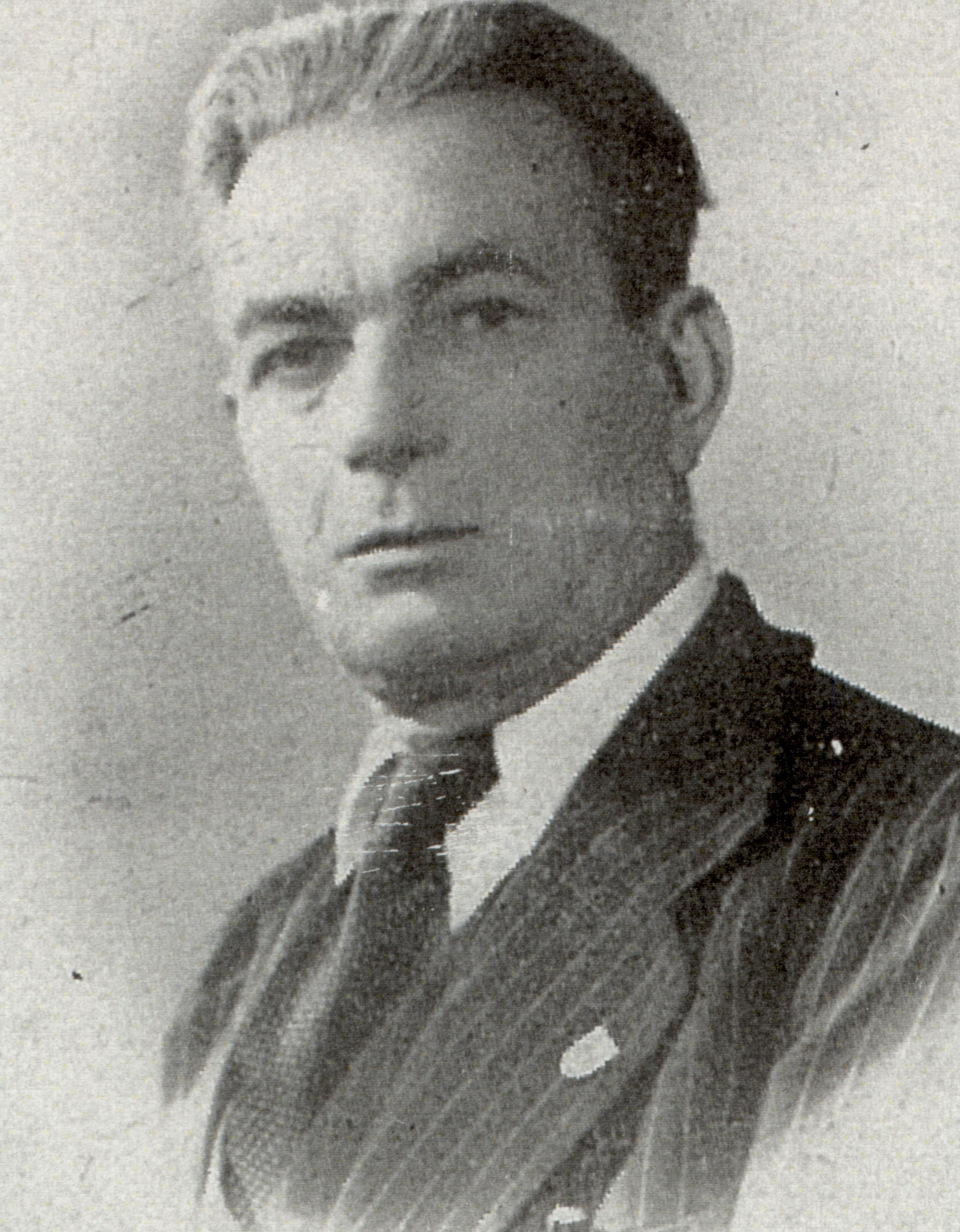

Filippo Amedeo (2 February 1891 – 18 June 1946) was an Italian politician and worker, socialist leader and parliamentarian..

Amedeo was born in Turin. He represented the Italian Socialist Party in the Chamber of Deputies from 1921 to 1926 and in the Constituent Assembly of Italy for a short time in 1946.

== Biography ==
=== Birth and youth battles ===
Filippo Amedeo was born on 2 February 1891 into a working-class family of very modest origins, so he was forced to learn a trade from a very young age. He became a carpenter and cabinetmaker and became involved in the trade union field, where he distinguished himself for his organizational skills and combativeness, becoming secretary of the Turin League of Woodworkers and subsequently secretary of the National Federation and member of the executive committee of the Chamber of Labour. He became involved in politics at an early age, approaching the anarcho-socialist and anti-militarist positions found in the socialist youth organisation. In 1909 he was reported as a member of the Social War Herveist group, inclined towards Sorelian revolutionary syndicalism.

=== The Libyan war ===
Despite his pacifism, in 1911 he was forced to take part in the Libyan war and in 1915 he was called up to arms in the First World War. However, he did not stop carrying out anti-militarist propaganda activities and for this reason he was twice subjected to military proceedings and subsequently condemned. He was a valiant soldier who did not want to be decorated for a war he did not believe in because it was in clear contrast with his anti-militarist principles. In 1918 his relations with the Turin socialists for the dissemination of propaganda material were intercepted and therefore he was tried with his companions, taking on responsibilities that were not his in order not to reveal the organizational plot. In 1920 he played an important role in the occupation of the factory for which he had worked since returning from the war, the Garavini mechanical plant; he also participated in the bitter conflicts between capital and labor that erupted with the demobilization and return of the veterans.

=== From incarceration to electoral success ===
On November 20, 1920, he was arrested and imprisoned; that same day his mother died due to the pain of hearing the news of her son's incarceration. The dignity with which Amedeo experienced prison did not go unnoticed and his party colleagues indicated his name as a protest candidate in the 1921 elections. He was voted by plebiscite, coming third after two established leaders of Turin's reformist socialism with Giulio Casalini and Giuseppe Romita; in May 1921 he left his cell in the Carceri Nuove of Turin to take the seat of Palazzo Montecitorio as a deputy of the XXVI legislature. In the political struggle of those years he sided with the maximalist tendency of Giacinto Menotti Serrati, Arturo Vella and Olindo Vernocchi which at the 1922 congress would lead to the expulsion of the reformists, without embracing the fusionist positions. With Nenni he launched, already in 1923, the national socialist defense committee, where he was elected secretary of the federation, a position he held until 1926, alongside Romita and Barberis.

=== His anti-fascist militancy. ===
He was successfully re-elected in 1924 and from then on began his battle against the regime, first on the benches of Parliament, then in the anti-fascist emigration. He joined the National Socialist Trade Union Committee, in a difficult moment, when the tension between the various trade union components of the left was at its peak, failing to find an agreement for a common anti-fascist opposition on the social terrain, with oscillations that ranged from the legalitarianism of the General Confederation of Labor to the insurrectionism of the communists. In the face of the Matteotti crime, the positions maintained were those of the Aventine pro-democracy, advocates of a moral protest in defense of parliamentarianism and legality, opposed to an opposition to the regime that would involve an appeal to the country, and the request for Mussolini's resignation, with the proclamation of a new government. Amedeo favored a revolutionary solution and, alongside Piero Gobetti, created the Opposition Committee, founded in Turin. On 18 June 1924, the resignation of the head of government and the self-convocation of the minority deputies to appoint another executive were requested, but the proposal was not followed up at a national level. January 3, 1925 marked the fascist revenge in the Chamber and, in the country, with a further restriction of freedoms. Between 17 and 25 February, Amedeo presided over two meetings of the Opposition Committee, together with representatives of the factories' internal commissions, in order to broaden the social opposition.

=== The clandestine structuring of the Party. ===
In the summer of '25, after the failure of the Aventine, Amedeo dedicated himself to the clandestine organization of the party, in Piedmont, in the factories, where he had his main contacts. Following the Zaniboni attack and the forced dissolution of the PSU, he converged on Nenni's positions for the strengthening of a socialist leadership group with a view to reunification with the reformists, now without an organizational reference. In March 1926 Nenni founded the magazine "Quarto Stato" with Carlo Rosselli which marked the overcoming of the Aventine failure and a recomposition of the two socialist branches on renewed theoretical bases. Amedeo was one of its collaborators, while his further attempt was to found a socialist unity committee that hoped for the greatest possible convergence in every political and trade union initiative. Socialist reunification was seen as overcoming old ideological divisions in the name of active voluntarism in the fight against dictatorship.

== The exile ==
On the evening of November 9, the day the public safety laws came into force, Amedeo was arrested. To escape it, he clandestinely boarded a steamship and emigrated to France. In 1940 he was condemned in absentia by the Special Tribunal for the defense of the state for Impairment of national prestige abroad (Filippo Amedeo and Giuseppe Pitet had published, in July 1939, in the Voce degli Italiani an interview entitled What is the state of soul of the Italian soldiers).

== League of Rights. ==
Active member of the League of Human Rights transformed into an effective instrument of assistance and integration of the numerous Italian emigrants. He participated intensely in the political debate within the PSI during the emigration on the issues that troubled the homeland in the last period. He expressed himself in favor of unification with the reformists and for a broad alliance to be pursued with the other anti-fascist forces present in the Concentration.

== The break with the maximalists in Grenoble ==
The Grenoble congress of 1930 recorded a strong split, even with a prevalence of the unitarians, and yet another split with the definitive break with the maximalists, destined for a long agony. The revisionists celebrated the congress dominated by Nenni, to which Amedeo continued to give his support and participation, accompanied by the younger and more capable forces who were fighting for an ideological revision and an immediate unification of the PSI with the Socialist Unitary Workers' Party Italians from Turati, Treves and Saragat and with the support of the Socialist International. It was a question of developing practicable objectives in a concrete strategy to fight against fascism, a policy of alliances that would overcome the usual classist barriers, inserting the PSI fully into the assembly of social democratic parties. Amedeo was repeatedly elected in the direction of the Section of the Socialist Workers International"; he was a lecturer for Lidu, the Italian League of Human Rights, and for SFIO, the French socialist party. At the end of the 1920s he tried to re-establish relations with his Turin comrades who remained at home by acting as an intermediary with France, with the Parisian management. He had an extensive clandestine correspondence delivered to convey propaganda material issued by the leaders of the two parties that would be reunited in July 1930 and spread it in Piedmont, Lombardy and Liguria. The work was dismantled by an infiltrator who tried to gain Amedeo's trust, leading to the arrest of seven Turin citizens including Romita and Mario Amedeo, his brother. In '36 he fought in the civil war in Spain alongside Nenni and De Rosa in the Matteotti Brigades until the defeat of the Republic.

== The resistance ==
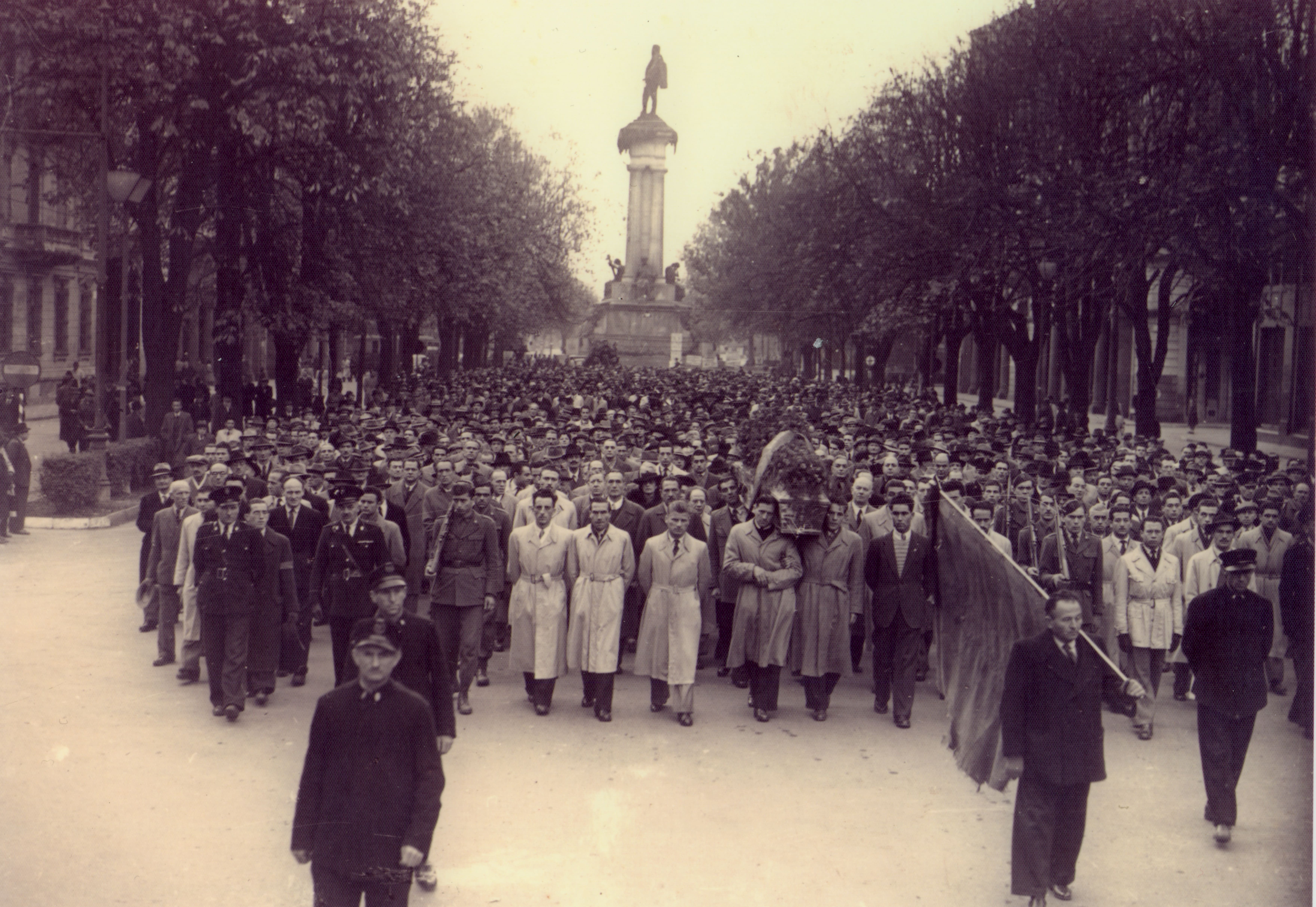
Civil funeral of Filippo Amedeo

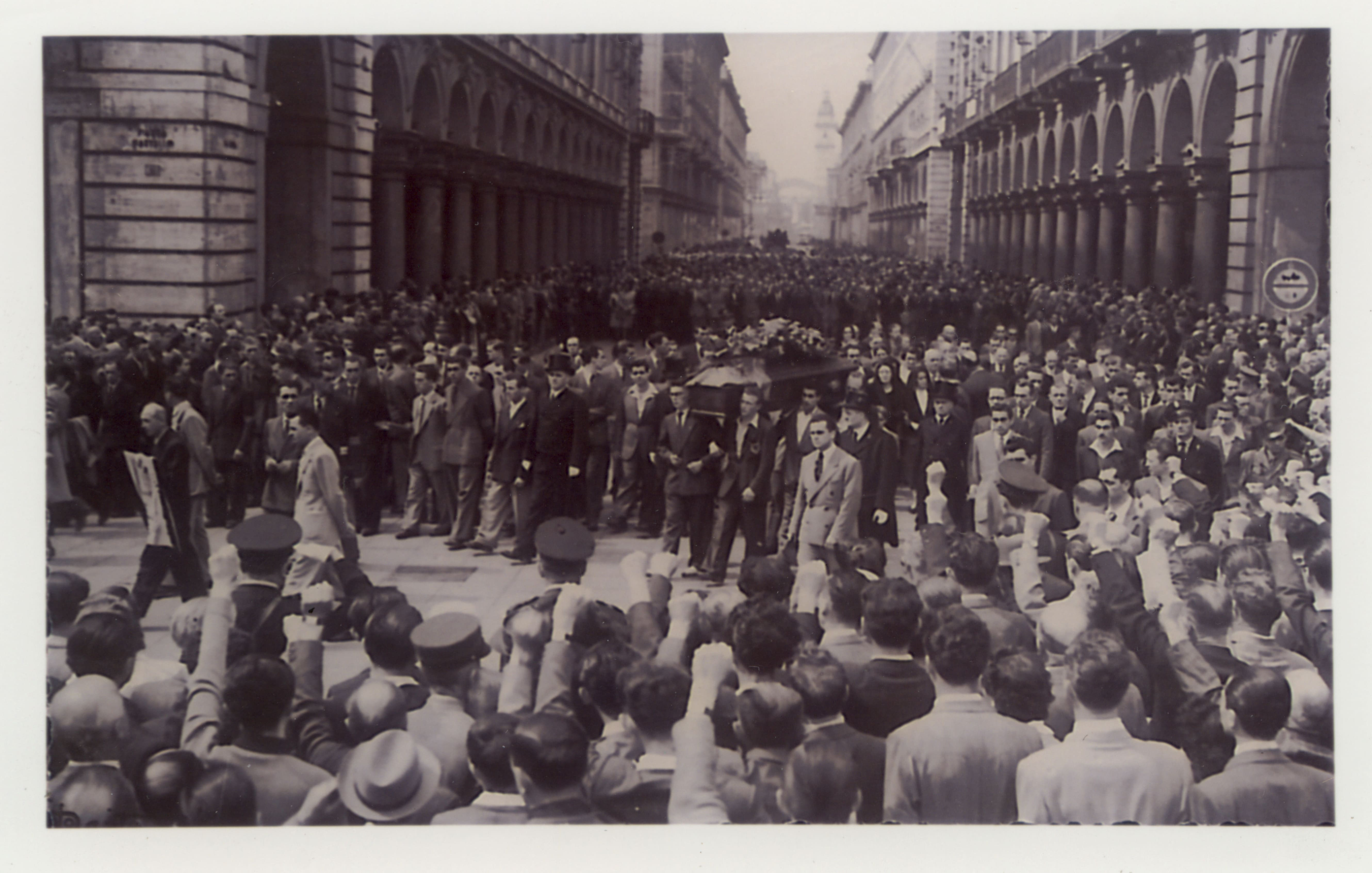
Civil funeral of Filippo Amedeo.

Returning to France he was greeted by entry into the war and the following year he found himself fighting against fascism allied with the Nazis. He was arrested in 1943 by the Gestapo while trying to cross the border and was locked up in the Nuove of Turin, from where he was freed by a popular assault. In Turin, a National Front of united action had been clandestinely reconstituted together with communists, Catholics and shareholders and therefore the Socialist Regional Committee operated there. In those days Amedeo took part in an important meeting to deal with the situation in Badoglia, but was arrested again, after having been appointed city organizational secretary. He was taken to Susa prison, but then released; a bounty of half a million lire was hanging on him, forcing him back into hiding. His political positions continued to be consistent with those of exile. His last period of life was dedicated to organizational work, during the electoral campaign that would have seen him among the elected representatives of his constituency without being able to subsequently see his nation reborn on new foundations. He died on 18 June 1946 from a sudden illness, probably due to the wear and tear of the experiences he had lived. Given the strong contribution he made in the anti-fascist struggle, on the day of his secular funeral, one of the first to be celebrated after the Second World War, an immense crowd attended to pay homage to him. Not only people close to the socialist party, but also people grateful for the value brought in such a difficult moment for Italy.
