= Maximalists =

Maximalists may refer to several political movements and parties including:

- The Bolsheviks
- The Maximalist Italian Socialist Party
- The Portuguese Maximalist Federation
- The Union of Socialists-Revolutionaries-Maximalists
