= Vernocchi =

Vernocchi is a surname. Notable people with the surname include:

- Olindo Vernocchi (1888-1948), Italian politician and journalist
- Veronica Vernocchi (born 1978), Italian female Muay Thai fighter and kickboxer artis
