= Ugo Coccia =

Italian journalist and politician (1895–1932)

Secretary General of the Italian Socialist Party
- In office 31 December 1926 – 15 January 1928
- Preceded by: Angelica Balabanoff
- Succeeded by: Olindo Vernocchi
- In office 30 July 1930 – 23 December 1932
- Preceded by: Secretariat Committee
- Succeeded by: Pietro Nenni

Personal details
- Born: 11 August 1895 Rieti, Kingdom of Italy
- Died: 23 December 1932 (aged 37) Hyères, France
- Party: Italian Socialist Party
- Occupation: Journalist

Ugo Coccia (11 August 1895 – 23 December 1932) was an Italian socialist journalist and politician who served as the secretary of the Italian Socialist Party (PSI) for two terms from 1926 to 1928 and from 1930 to 1932. He died in exile in Hyères, France.

== Biography ==
Coccia was born in Rieti on 11 August 1895. He started his socialist activities from young age. He was the editor of the Avanti! newspaper until 1928 when Angelica Balabanoff assumed the post.

Coccia left Italy in 1926 when a strict law which ended the legal existence of the oppositional movements were put into force by the Fascist government of Benito Mussolini. Coccia continued his activities in Switzerland and France. He became the secretary of the PSI on 31 December 1926 succeeding Olindo Vernocchi in the post. Coccia's tenure ended on 15 January 1928 when Angelica Balabanoff was elected to the post. Coccia was elected secretary of the secretary of the PSI-IOS (Socialist Workers' International) at the unity congress held in Paris on 30 July 1930, replacing Pietro Nenni in the post. A secretariat committee composed of Oddino Morgari, Giuseppe Saragat and Angelo Tasca assumed the post on 2 September 1939.

Coccia died in Hyères, France, on 23 December 1932, while serving as the secretary of the PSI-IOS, from heart disease resulting from a rheumatic disease which he contracted in the trenches during World War II.

His son, Franco Coccia (1929–2017), was also a politician.

== Legacy ==
A conference in memory of Coccia was organized by the Filippo Turati Foundation and the Pietro Nenni Foundation in his hometown, Rieti, on 12 March 1999. The papers presented at the conference were published as a book entitled Ugo Coccia e la generazione degli esuli (Italian: Ugo Coccia and the generation of exiles) in 2001.
