= Alberto Jacometti =

Italian journalist and politician (1902–1985)

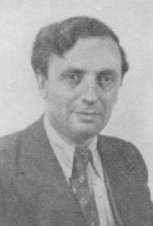

Secretary General of the Italian Socialist Party
- In office April 1948 – 1949
- Preceded by: Lelio Basso
- Succeeded by: Pietro Nenni

Personal details
- Born: 10 March 1902 San Pietro Mosezzo, Novara, Kingdom of Italy
- Died: 10 January 1985 (aged 82) Novara, Italy
- Party: Italian Socialist Party

Alberto Jacometti (10 March 1902 – 10 January 1985) was an Italian journalist and socialist politician. He served as a deputy at the Italian Parliament and as a secretary general of the Italian Socialist Party for a short period between 1948 and 1949. He resigned from the party one year before his death in 1985.

== Biography ==
Jacometti was born in San Pietro Mosezzo, Province of Novara, on 10 March 1902. He joined the Italian Socialist Party and participated in World War I. When the oppression of the Fascist rule intensified he left Italy and settled in Paris in 1926. There he edited a publication entitled L'iniziativa. In 1929 he settled in Belgium and contributed to a publication, Problemi della Rivoluzione italiana. From 1941 he became part of the National Committee of Liberation for the Novara province.

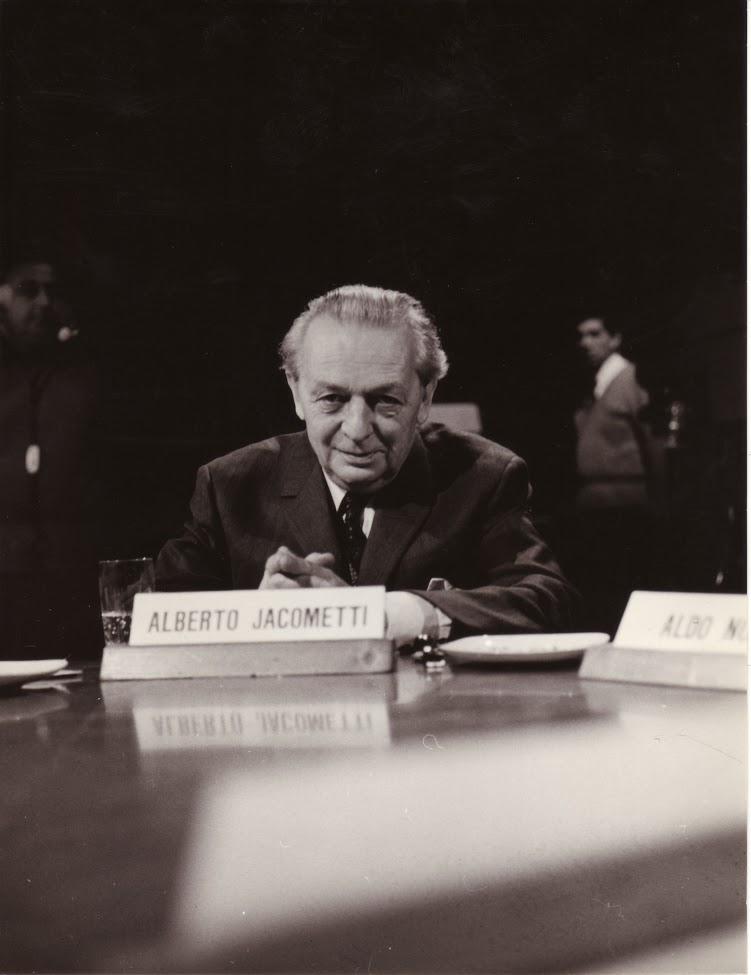
Jacometti during a television interview in 1963

Following his return to Italy Jacometti was elected as a member of the National Council. Being a member of the Italian Socialist Party he led the centrist faction along with Riccardo Lombardi. In the congress held on 18 April 1948 Jacometti was elected as the secretary general of the Italian Socialist Party succeeding Lelio Basso who had resigned from the office. Before the election Jacometti, Riccardo Lombardi and Giuseppe Romita led the opposition group against Basso's leadership. Jacometti's term as the secretary general was brief and ended in 1949 when he was forced to resign from the office due to the opposition of Pietro Nenni and Lelio Basso.

Jacometti served at the Italian Parliament until 1963. He left the Italian Socialist Party in 1984 due to conflict with the party leader Bettino Craxi. Jacometti died in his hometown, Novara, 10 January 1985.
