= Giuliana Nenni =

Italian journalist and politician (1911–2002)

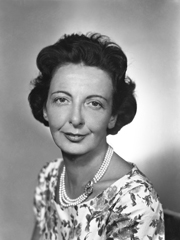

Member of the Senate of the Republic
- In office 12 June 1958 – 4 June 1968
- Constituency: Emilia Romagna

Member of the Chamber of Deputies
- In office 8 May 1948 – 11 June 1958
- Constituency: Bologna

Personal details
- Born: 26 December 1911 Forlì, Kingdom of Italy
- Died: 19 March 2002 (aged 90) Rome, Italy
- Party: Italian Socialist Party
- Parents: Pietro Nenni (father); Carmen Emiliani (mother) (mother)
- Relatives: Vittoria Nenni (sister)
- Occupation: Journalist

Giuliana Nenni (26 December 1911 – 19 March 2002) was an Italian journalist and politician. She served in the Italian Parliament and Senate for the Italian Socialist Party. She was known as the sister of all Romagna’s women.

== Early life and education ==
Giuliana Nenni was born in Forlì on 26 December 1911. She was the eldest daughter of Pietro Nenni, leader of the Italian Socialist Party, and Carmen Emiliani. Her father was in prison when Giuliana was born. She had three younger sisters; Eva, Vittoria, and Luciana.

When her family was in exile in Paris from 1926 Nenni attended the courses on French civilization at the Sorbonne University.

== Career and activities ==
Nenni edited a socialist newspaper entitled Populaire in Paris. She joined the Italian Socialist Party in 1934. She and her family returned to Italy after the Fascist rule ended in 1943. In 1944 she involved in the establishment of a leftist resistance movement in Rome, Unione Donne Italiane (UDI). She was a member of the Italy-USSR association which was established by the Italian Socialist Party and the Italian Communist Party in 1949.

In 1948 Nenni was elected to the Italian Parliament for the Italian Socialist Party from Bologna and also, served at the Parliament for the next term. She became a member of the Italian Senate in 1958 and served there for two successive terms. In June 1958 the socialist deputy Luigi Sansone presented a proposal to introduce a divorce law to the Senate in collaboration with Giuliana Nenni which was not supported by the Senate. From 1968 Nenni began to work as the private secretary of her father, Pietro Nenni.

Following the death of Pietro Nenni in January 1980 his daughters, Giuliana and Luciana, established the Pietro Nenni Foundation.

== Personal life and death ==
Nenni was not married and had no children. She died in Rome on 19 March 2002.

== Electoral history ==
Election	House	Constituency	Party	Votes	Result
1948	Chamber of Deputies	Bologna–Ferrara–Ravenna–Forlì	FDP	40,871	Elected
1953	Chamber of Deputies	Bologna–Ferrara–Ravenna–Forlì	PSI	13,086	Elected
1958	Senate of the Republic	Emilia-Romagna – Ferrara	PSI	27,426	Elected
1963	Senate of the Republic	Emilia-Romagna – Ferrara	PSI	25,195	Elected
