= Angelica Balabanoff =

Russian-Italian writer and social activist (1878–1965)

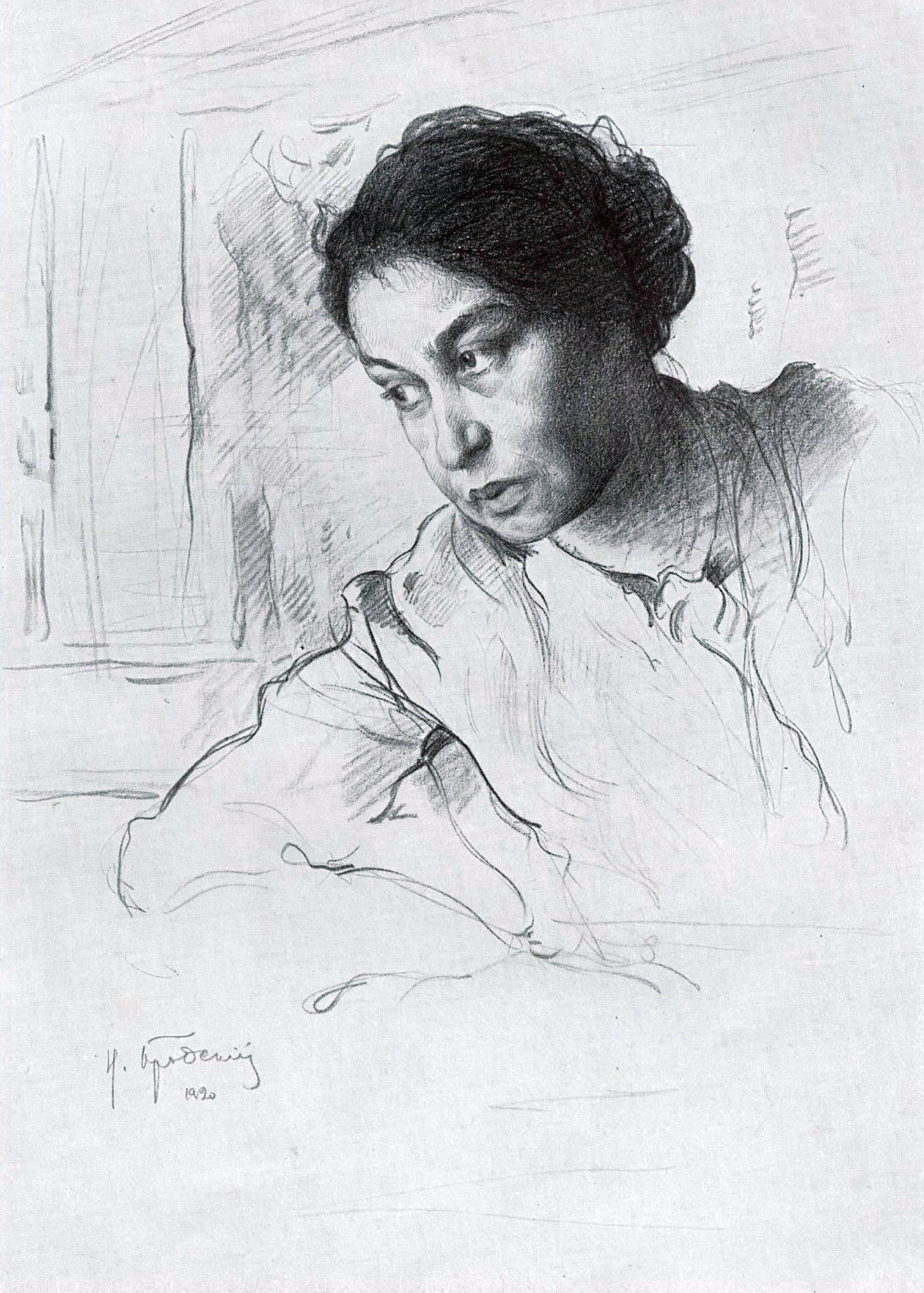
- 1920 portrait
- Born: Anzhelika Isaakovna Roizman; August 4, 1878; Chernigov, Russian Empire
- Died: November 25, 1965 (aged 87); Rome, Italy
- Other names: Angelica Balabanov, Angelica Balabanova, Anželika Balabanova
- Occupations: Activist, secretary of the Comintern
- Political party: PSI (1900–1930; 1945–1947); PSIm (1930–1945); PSDI (1947–1965)
- Other political affiliations: Bolshevik (1917–1922)

Angelica Isaakovna Balabanoff (also Balabanov or Balabanova; Russian: Анжелика Исааковна Балабанова, romanized: Anzhelika Isaakovna Balabanova; 4 August 1878 – 25 November 1965) was a Russian-Italian communist and social democratic activist of Jewish origin. She served as secretary of the Comintern from 1919 to 1920, and later became a political party leader in Italy.

== Biography ==
Angelica Balabanoff was born on 4 August 1878, into a wealthy Jewish family in Chernigov, a provincial capital within the Russian Empire. Her father was a landowner and had 16 children in total. Angelica was the youngest, and several of her siblings had died before she was born.

She received private education at home. There, she rebelled against her mother's strictness. At the age of 19, she left Chernigov to study in Belgium. While attending the New University of Brussels, she was exposed to political radicalism. After graduating with degrees in philosophy and literature, she settled in Rome and began to organize immigrant workers in the textile industry, joining the Italian Socialist Party (Partito Socialista Italiano; PSI) in 1900. She became closely associated with Antonio Labriola, Giacinto Menotti Serrati, Benito Mussolini, and the party's founder Filippo Turati.

She moved further to the left during the First World War, becoming active in the Zimmerwald Movement. During the war, she spent some time in exile in neutral Sweden, where she was affiliated with the Left Socialist movement and became a close friend of Swedish Communist leaders Ture Nerman, Fredrik Ström, Zeth Höglund and Kata Dalström.

When the Russian Revolution broke out in 1917, Balabanoff travelled to Russia and joined the Bolsheviks. According to Emma Goldman, she became disillusioned with the style of socialism in Russia and "had become rooted in the soil of Italy". Balabanoff told Goldman of her discomfort about temporarily living in the Narishkin Palace. She became secretary of the Communist Third International in 1919 and worked alongside Goldman, Vladimir Lenin and Grigory Zinoviev, as well as many others. This led her to become an open critic of Bolshevism, and she left Russia in 1922, travelling back to Italy to reunite with her friend and comrade Giacinto Menotti Serrati.

After Serrati abandoned the PSI for the Communist Party of Italy (Partito Comunista d'Italia; PCdI) in 1924, she assumed control of his Maximalist group (Massimalisti) until the Fascist authorities forced her into exile in Switzerland, where she edited Avanti! and became the secretary of the Paris Bureau. She had first encountered Mussolini, who at the time was still a socialist, while addressing a meeting in Lausanne; her impression of him was not flattering. "I had never seen a more wretched human being", she later wrote, "... he seemed more concerned with his inner turmoil than what I was saying." In 1930, the PSI split over the issue of whether or not to merge with the reformist socialists who had been expelled from the party eight years previously; as a maximalist, Balabanoff dissented from the leadership's desire for "fusion" and formed a new political grouping, the Italian Socialist Party (Maximalist) (Partito Socialista Italiano Massimalista; PSIm), which she led for the next six years.

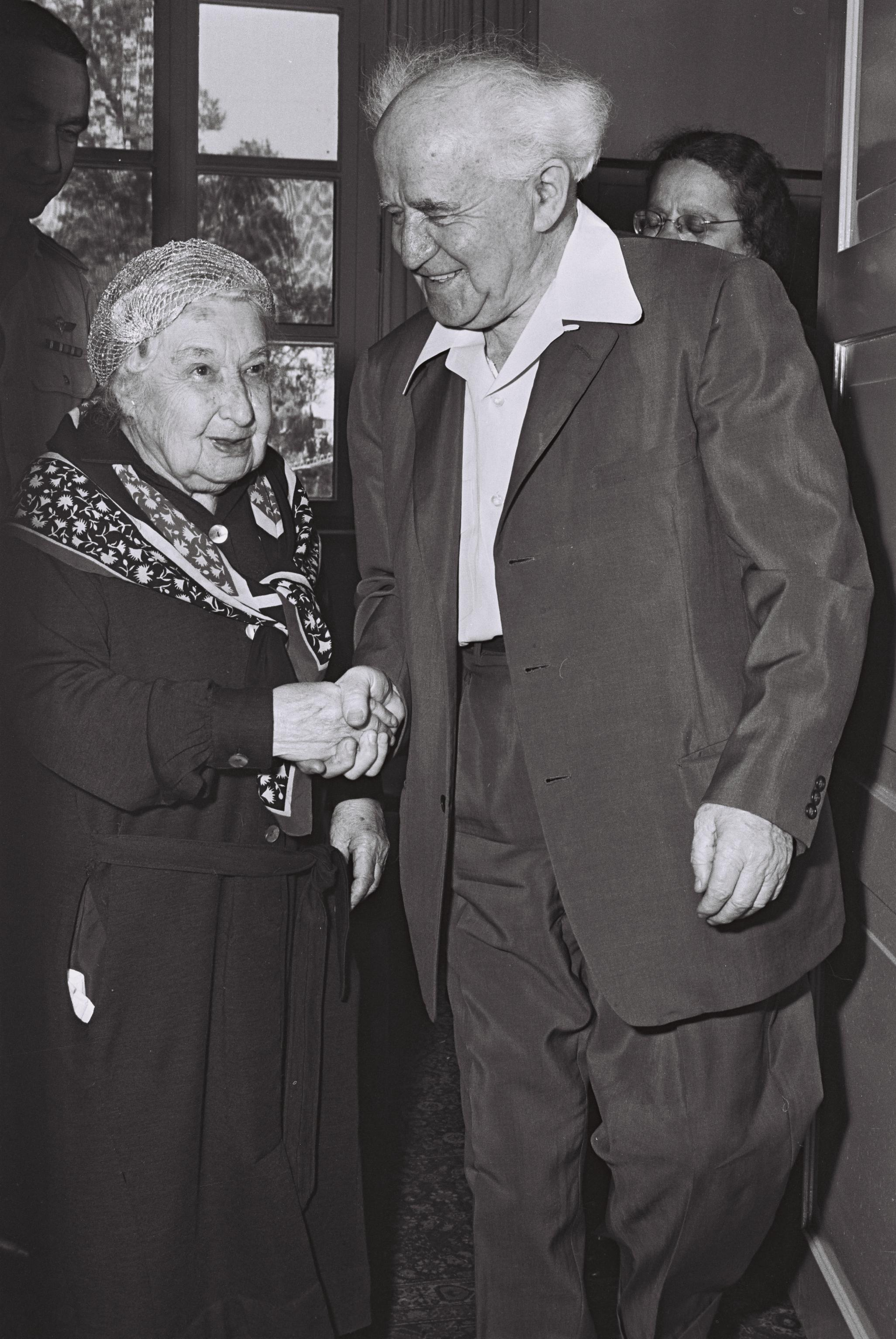
Angelica Balabanoff visiting David Ben Gurion in Tel Aviv, 1962

She later moved to Paris, then New York City before the outbreak of the Second World War. When the war ended, she returned to Italy and rejoined the PSI for a brief period, before once again breaking with it to follow Giuseppe Saragat into the new anti-communist Italian Socialist Workers' Party (Partito Socialista dei Lavoratori Italiani; PSLI), which in 1951 merged with the United Socialist Party (Partito Socialista Unitario; PSU) to become the Italian Democratic Socialist Party (Partito Socialista Democratico Italiano; PSDI).

== Legacy ==
Balabanoff is a major character in the 1993 RAI Italian language production Il Giovane Mussolini, portrayed by Susanne Lothar.

Balabanoff is memorialized in Judy Chicago's The Dinner Party.

A street in the urban area of Colli Aniene in Rome has been named after her.

Edmund Wilson, the noted American man of letters, considered her to be an accomplished poet in five languages (Russian, German, French, Italian, and English) and in 1943 wrote a very favorable article about her poetry in The Nation.

== Works ==
- Il vostro Dovere in tempo di Elezioni: Alle Proletarie (Your Duty in Time of Elections: to the Proletarian Women). Lugano: Cooperativa Tipografica Sociale, 1904.
- Neskol'ko slov ob agitatsii: Pis'mo-lektsiia (A Few Words on Agitation: Correspondence Lecture). Moscow: Gosudarstvennoe Izdatel'stvo, 1920.
- Ot rabstva k svobode: Obiazannosti i prava kommunistov v pervoi trudovoi respublike (From Slavery to Freedom: Duties and Rights of Communists in the First Laborers' Republic). Moscow: Gosudarstvennoe Izdatel'stvo, 1920 / Milano, Avanti!, 1921.
- Svetloi pamiati Iakova Mikhailovicha Sverdlova. (To the Blessed Memory of Iakov Mikhailovich Sverdlov). Moscow: Gosudarstvennoe Izdatel'stvo, 1920.
- Iz lichnykh vospominanii Tsimmerval'dtsa (from the Personal Reminiscences of the Zimmerwaldists). Leningrad-Moscow: Izdatel'stvo "Kniga," 1925.
- Erziehung der Massen zum Marxismus: Psychologisch-pädagogische Betrachtungen (Educating the Masses to Marxism: Psychological-Pedagogical Considerations). Berlin: Laub, 1927.
- Erinnerungen und Erlebnisse, Berlin, E. Laubsche Verlagsbuchhandlung, 1927.
- Marx und Engels als Freidenker in ihren Schriften (Marx and Engels as Free-Thinkers in their Writings). Berlin: Der Freidenker, 1930.
- Wesen und Werdegang des italienischen Faschismus, Wien, Hess & Co., 1931.
- Memorie, Milano-Parigi, Avanti!, 1931.
- Sozialismus als Weltanschauung (Socialism as a Worldview). Berlin: Dt. Freidenkerverband, c. 1932.
- Caduti per noi, caduti per voi (Fallen for Us, Fallen for You). New York: Edizione "La Fiaccola," c. 1935.
- My Life as a Rebel. London: Hamish Hamilton, 1938.
- Traitor: Benito Mussolini and his "Conquest" of Power. New York: G. Popolizio, c. 1942 / (Il traditore Mussolini) Roma-Milano, Avanti!, 1945.
- Tears. New York, E. Laub / Chicago: Jay Bass, 1943.
- Ricordi di una socialista, Roma, De Luigi, 1946.
- Impressions of Lenin. Isotta Cesari, trans. Ann Arbor, University of Michigan Press, 1964 (Lenin visto da vicino, Roma, Opere nuove, 1959).
- La mia vita di rivoluzionaria, Milano, Feltrinelli, 1979.

== Sources ==
- Lafont, Maria (2016). The Strange Comrade Balabanoff: The Life of a Communist Rebel. McFarland Publishers. ISBN 978-0-7864-9878-9.
- White, Libby (2007). "Balabanoff, Angelica". Encyclopaedia Judaica (2nd ed.). Detroit: Macmillan Reference USA. pp. 82–83. ISBN 978-0-02-865931-2.
