= Vittoria Nenni =

Italian resistance fighter (1915–1943)

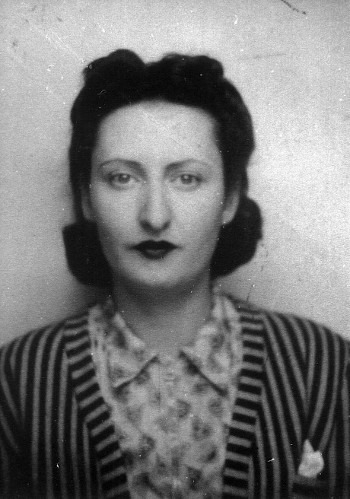
Vittoria Nenni

Vittoria Gorizia Daubeuf (née Nenni; 31 October 1915 – 15 or 16 July 1943) was an Italian anti-fascist activist, active in the French Resistance during the Second World War. The daughter of Italian socialist politician Pietro Nenni, Vittoria and her family fled to France in 1928 to escape persecution and violence in Fascist Italy.

Nenni grew up in interwar France and married the publisher Henri Dabeuf in 1937. In 1942, during the Nazi occupation of France, Dabeuf was caught printing French Communist Party leaflets and executed by firing squad. Nenni was also arrested and deported to the Auschwitz concentration camp, where she spent seven months before dying of disease, probably typhoid fever.

== Background ==
Vittoria Gorizia Nenni was born in Ancona on 31 October 1915 as the third daughter of Pietro Nenni, later a central figure and leader of the Italian Socialist Party, and Carmen Emiliani. At the time of Vittoria's birth, Pietro fought in the Third Battle of the Isonzo. Growing up, Vittoria was given the affectionate nickname Vivà by her family members. She had two elder sisters, Giuliana and Eva, and a younger sister, Luciana. The family eventually moved to Milan and Vittoria began school in October 1922; she reportedly excelled in Italian and mathematics.

In the 1920s, the Nenni family was repeatedly harassed and attacked by fascists. Incidents included a group of fascists terrorizing Vittoria on her way to school in 1926 and Vittoria returning home to find a group of Blackshirts destroying the family's apartment and threatening to make her father "end up like Matteotti". A series of increasingly violent incidents eventually prompted the family to flee to France in 1928, taking up residence in Paris.

Vittoria grew up in the Paris of interwar France, which experienced a relatively progressive political climate, unlike Fascist Italy. Women could study and work, and there was a trend of increasing social freedom. Vittoria attended secondary school in Paris. Compared to her sisters, Vittoria was the least politically active and was not involved in the Italian Socialist Party, though she shared her family's strong democratic and progressive values. In 1937, Vittoria married Henri Dabeuf and acquired French citizenship through their marriage. Dabeuf managed a publishing company, Société Française d'Impressions et d'Éditions, and the couple lived at 22 rue Rémy et Jean de Gourmont.

== French Resistance ==
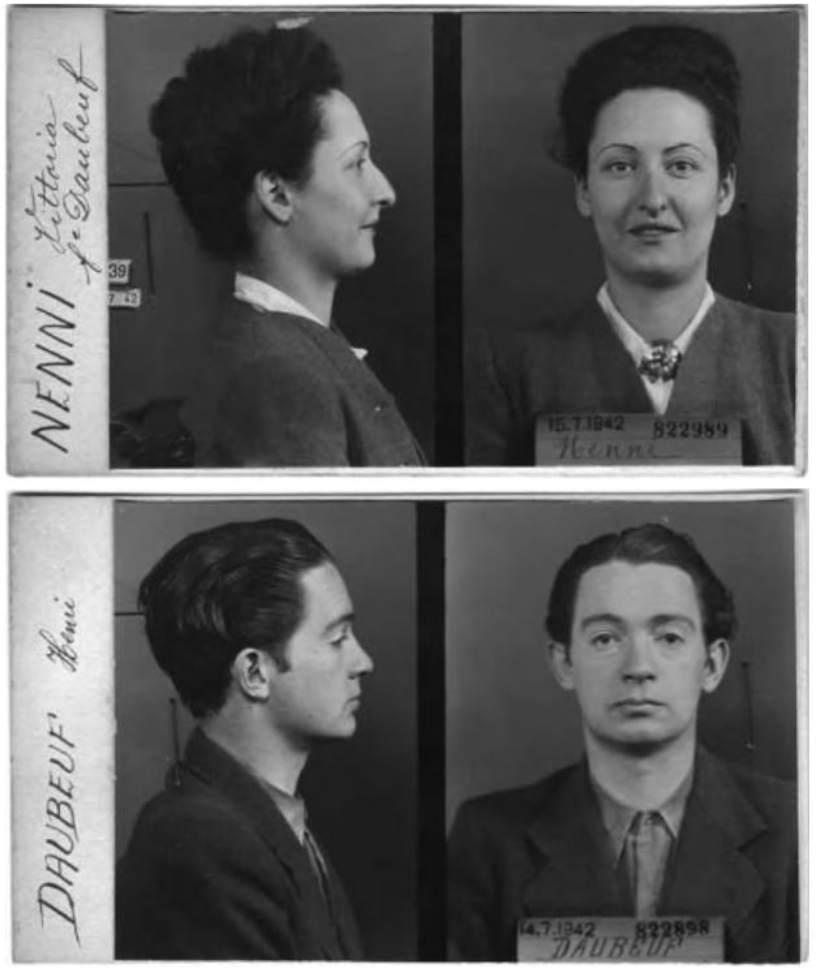
Mug shots of Vittoria (top) and her husband Henri (bottom), June 1942

Nenni and Dabeuf reportedly became involved in the French Resistance after Nazi Germany occupied France in 1940.

In 1942, members of the French Communist Party approached Dabeuf about using his publishing company to print leaflets and brochures. Dabeuf spoke to Nenni about the prospect and she encouraged him to go through with it. On 19 June 1942, the authorities inspected the printing house and discovered incinerated remnants of Communist Party leaflets. Henri was promptly arrested.

=== Arrest and death ===
After her husband's arrest, Nenni visited Dabeuf every day and brought him food. On 23 June, she was also arrested. The two were charged with having printed and distributed anti-Nazi propaganda, and for having spread "anti-French Gaullist propaganda" in university circles.

On 10 August, the men involved in the case were taken away to Fort Mont-Valérien, where Dabeuf was executed by firing squad on the following day. Nenni was initially detained at Fort de Romainville. On 21 or 23 January 1943, she was deported to the Auschwitz concentration camp, alongside 230 other women involved in the French Resistance. Nenni could have avoided deportation to Auschwitz if she had stressed her Italian nationality, though she refused despite being offered to be sent to Italy, supposedly declaring that she "felt French" and wanted to follow the fate of her fellow prisoners.

In Auschwitz, Nenni was tattooed with the serial number 31635. She was placed with the French communists, despite not being a communist and not having joined the Italian Socialist Party. Nenni quickly began to suffer from health complications, including typhus, kidney issues, and numerous sores on her legs. Despite her worsening condition, Nenni helped to treat diseases of some of the fellow prisoners.

Vittoria Nenni probably died of typhoid fever in Auschwitz on 15 or 16 July 1943. Records discovered by Soviet forces after the liberation of Auschwitz state that inmate no. 31635 died of "flu". Her last recorded written words were "Tell my father that I have never lost courage and that I regret nothing."

== Legacy ==
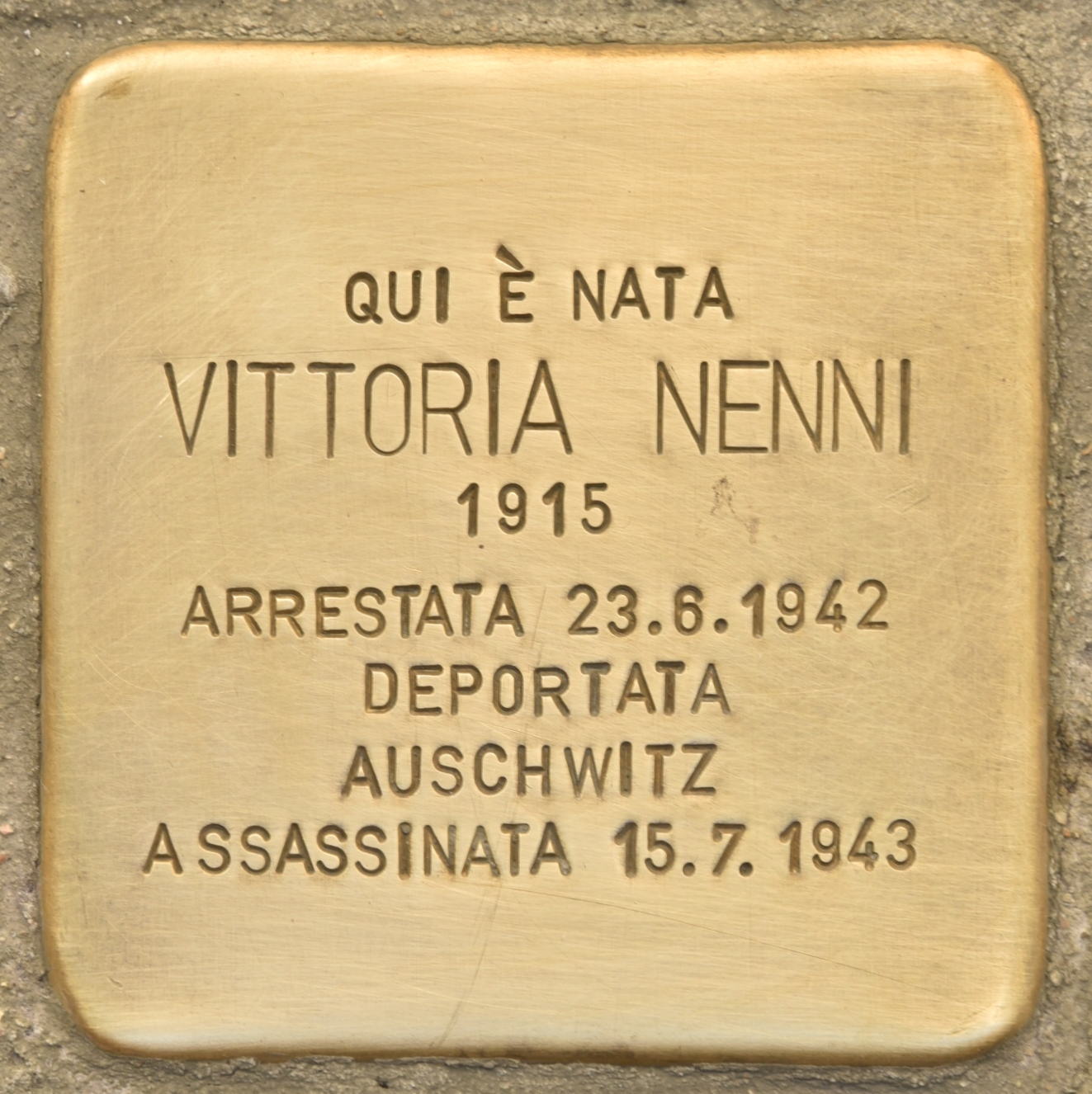
Stolperstein of Vittoria Nenni in Ancona

Nenni's family pursued several desperate attempts to save her, including enlisting the aid of embassies and the Red Cross. Pietro Nenni even considered reaching out to Benito Mussolini, fascist dictator of Italy. Mussolini had been informed of Vittoria's deportation as well as the execution of her husband in 1942. The Nenni family did not know that Vittoria had been deported to Auschwitz, or that she had died, until informed by Prime Minister Alcide De Gasperi in May 1945.

Pietro Nenni visited Auschwitz in 1947 to commemorate his daughter and meet some of the women who had been interned with her. In 1965, Italian president Giuseppe Saragat visited Auschwitz and also commemorated Nenni. In 1971, the Israeli government planted a tree in the Forest of the Martyrs in Nenni's memory. Pietro Nenni and Bettino Craxi visited the forest and Pietro laid down a memorial stone. In 1988, the Italian Socialist Party's membership card was dedicated to Nenni and featured a painting of her by Renato Guttuso. Several streets in Italy have been named after Nenni. On 24 January 2020, a stolperstein (commemorative brass plate) of Nenni was installed in Ancona near the place of her birth.
