= Olindo Vernocchi =

Italian politician, journalist and anti-fascist

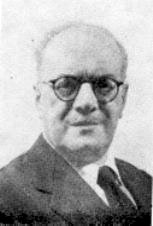
Olindo Vernocchi

Olindo Vernocchi (Forlimpopoli, 12 April 1888 – Rome, 9 March 1948) was an Italian politician, journalist and anti- fascist, national secretary of the Italian Socialist Party (PSI), member of the Constituent Assembly of Italy and president of the Istituto Luce.

== Commitment to socialism ==
The son of a doctor, Vernocchi had enrolled at the University of Bologna to study law in 1908 and during his studies he began to take an interest in politics. He joined the local socialist movement, then growing in his region, and attended various conferences of a political nature together with his friend, the young Benito Mussolini. It was he who first called him "duce" when Mussolini was released from prison in 1912.

In 1910 he was elected city councilor in Forlimpopoli, a position confirmed in the subsequent elections of 1914. In the same year he was secretary of the XIV national congress of the PSI held in Ancona at the end of April and major player in the Red Week strikes in June. A few months later he took over the sole direction of the socialist newspaper from Forlì La Lotta di Classe of which he had already been co-director since 1912 to replace Mussolini, who had moved on to Avanti!.

When Italy entered the First World War, he was called up to arms on 7 June 1915, and assigned to the Forlì garrison in the 11th Infantry Regiment; however, due to his party activity, Vernocchi was soon transferred to Agrigento, in southern Sicily, to the 5th Infantry Regiment. Here, while Enrico La Loggia worked towards the consolidation of the Reformist Socialist Party into a unitary socialist party, Vernocchi approached the newly established city socialist section and collaborated in the formation of the first workers' leagues and the chamber of labour. He coordinated the preparation and execution of the first provincial congress of the party in Agrigento.

After the war ended with 1918, Vernocchi was placed on leave by the Royal Italian Army on 5 June 1919 and moved to Rome, where he began his important collaboration as editor with Avanti!, the party newspaper.

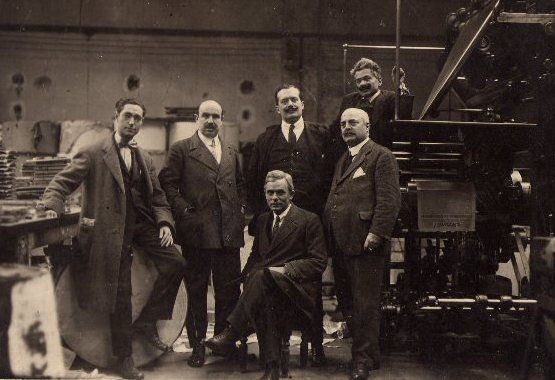
Group of socialists in the Roman editorial office of Avanti! in the early 1920s. The third standing from the left is Olindo Vernocchi.

== Editor of Avanti! ==
In addition to his work as editor for the newspaper, Vernocchi began to participate with increasing commitment in the Roman Union of the PSI, of which he was the leader until the fascist government dissolved political parties. He was a supporter of unitarism, as he made clear at the congresses of Livorno (1921), Rome (1922) and Milan (1923), opposing both the communist split and the purge of reformists. Instead, he was an ardent opponent of the Soviet proposal for unification with the newborn Communist Party of Italy, which was the prevailing line in the party at the end of the Milan congress. Moreover, 1923 was a year of serious tensions, which began shortly before that congress with the arrest of Giacinto Menotti Serrati, the leader of the maximalists, who had just returned from Moscow.

In the 1924 Italian general election, held under the new Acerbo law, he supported the cause of a unitary list of the left in opposition to the National List of Mussolini, but the left parties ran separately. At the same time he took on the co-direction of the Avanti!, together with Pietro Nenni and Riccardo Momigliano, while in the same year Antonio Gramsci founded l'Unità.

In April 1925, Tito Oro Nobili having resigned, he was elected secretary of the party. He was associated with the "Socialist Defense" current within the PSI, along with Nobili, Momigliano, Vella and Lazzari. This grouping rejected any move towards rapprochement with the Social Democrats and the Communists; the other two main currents were the Nennian one (which aimed to include the PSI in the Second International, possibly by fusion with the unitary socialists) and that of the young, "Azione Socialista", the internal left, which foresaw a united front of all left wing forces.

During his brief period as secretary he tried, in vain, to convince his comrades to follow the Aventine Secession with a focus on more class-based and revolutionary action. He tried to reorganize the party taking a cue from the "Bolshevization" of the newborn Communist Party of Italy, structuring it in a more agile and locally rooted way, with small groups spread across the workplace and directly in contact with the executive bodies. Engaged in this restructuring work, he succeeded on 18 September 1925 in having the party leadership vote for the withdrawal of the PSI from the opposition parliamentary bloc. His most ambitious project was an alliance with the Republican Party, built after meticulous negotiations with Nenni and the republican Mario Bergamo in October–November 1925. Due to the resistance from the Republican side and the unstable political situation, the initiative was not followed up.

In fact, in 1926, with the promulgation of the exceptional laws, the PSI was dissolved and Vernocchi was subjected to a strict surveillance regime after his failed attempt to leave the country in 1927. In December 1926 he was replaced in the secretariat of the PSI by Ugo Coccia. Saved from imprisonment by Mussolini's intervention, but in fact unable to participate in any political activity, he worked as an employee of the Phoenix insurance company; in 1932 he was employed as an insurance inspector at the company "La Fondiaria". Meanwhile he maintained close contacts with clandestine activism and numerous expatriate comrades.

== Underground and Resistance ==
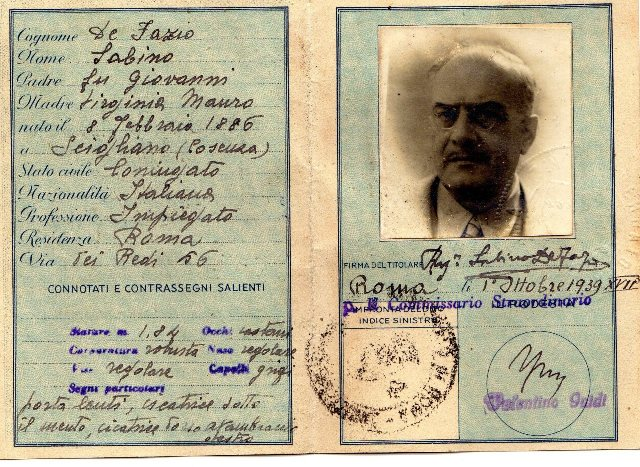
False identity document made out to Sabino De Fazio di Scigliano used by Olindo Vernocchi while in hiding.

On 22 July 1942 it was in his studio in Rome that the meeting was held in which the refoundation of the party was decided; Oreste Lizzadri, Giuseppe Romita, Nicola Perotti and Emilio Canevari also took part. The party began to consolidate: the "group of five" re-established contacts with the old militants, traveling throughout central and southern Italy and promoting anti-fascist actions directly in the city of Rome: distribution of leaflets and clandestine press and support for strikes (particularly important was the one on 1 May 1943 led by university students). The following year Vernocchi and Romita were able to go, representing the PSI in the Opposition Committee, to King Vittorio Emanuele III to ask for the dissolution of the National Fascist Party. Vernocchi worked particularly hard to ensure that the communists were also included in the aforementioned Committee, overcoming the resistance of Alcide De Gasperi. The meeting took place on 26 July 1943, the day following the arrest of Mussolini, after the Grand Council of Fascism voted no confidence in him. A few months later Vernocchi was admitted to the national leadership of the party, which at the same time took the transitory name of the Italian Socialist Party of Proletarian Unity, a name reconfirmed at the 1945 party congress. On 4 August 1944, together with Romita and the communists Amendola and Roveda, he signed the pact of action with the PCI. Meanwhile, on 11 September 1943, the first and only number of the newspaper Il Lavoro d'Italia was published, replacing the previous Lavoro Fascista. Jointly directed by Vernocchi, the Christian Democrat Alberto Canaletti Gaudenti and the communist Mario Alicata, it was an expression of the interconfederal union committee, a sign of the major anti-fascist parties' wish to unite their forces.

== After the war ==
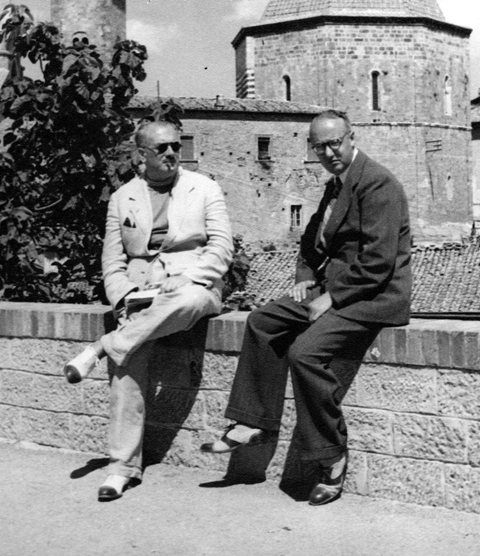
Olindo Vernocchi (left) and Pietro Nenni

After the end of the Second World War, Vernocchi was elected deputy to the Constituent Assembly, in which he was appointed a member of the First Commission for the examination of bills. His contribution to the work can be summed up in his support for some motions presented by the socialist group, for which Ernesto Carpano Maglioli was mostly the rapporteur.

In January 1947 he held the presidency of the socialist congress during the "split" of Giuseppe Saragat. He made the opening speech, in which he began by immediately revealing his unitarist position: "We have a duty towards the proletariat who trembles at the thought that our party might split up". After the separation, it was Vernocchi who ensured that the party resumed the original denomination of the Italian Socialist Party; his proposal also had the aim of preventing the secessionists from taking possession of the name.

In February, also in 1947, he was part of the delegation that on behalf of his party went to negotiate with the Christian Democrats and the Italian Communist Party the composition of the Third De Gasperi government which included the DC-PSI alliance-PCI, without the Italian Republican Party that had present in the previous cabinet. This " ad excludendum reshuffle" followed shortly after De Gasperi's return from the United States, where he had obtained a large loan for reconstruction.

The following month, continuing the activity of the Constituent Assembly, he was the rapporteur of the draft law n.12 concerning "Regulation of the national film industry", presented by De Gasperi and several of his ministers.

Meanwhile, as early as 1944 Vernocchi had been appointed president of the board of directors of the Istituto Luce thanks to the intervention of the Parri government, a position he held until May 1947 when the institute itself was placed in liquidation under the supervision of a special committee chaired again by Vernocchi. Under his presidency the Institute, renamed "Istituto Nazionale Luce Nuova" produced a series of newsreels, called Notiziari Nuova Luce, from 26 July 1945 until January 1947, for a total of 22 issues.

He ended his mandate at the Constituent Assembly on January 31, 1948, a few days after having attended his last party congress, held in Rome from January 19 to 22. He died less than two months later in his Roman home.

== Honours ==
Bronze Medal of Military Valor

«An exponent of a political party engaged in the clandestine struggle against the German invader, he proved to be an incomparable promoter and organizer in the struggle itself, distinguishing himself for courage, enthusiasm and high performance and making a precious contribution to the Patriotic Cause, despite the very active researches disposed towards him by the multiple organs of the Nazi-fascist police. Providing himself actively and tirelessly, he coordinated his activity with that of the "X" Center and the Military Front in the supreme interest of Italy and the Liberation of Rome. Admirable example of absolute dedication to the oppressed homeland. — Rome, September 1943 - June 1944.
