= Pietro Nenni =

Italian politician (1891–1980)

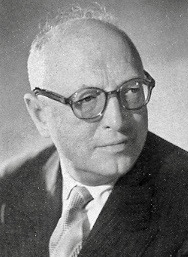
- Pietro Nenni in 1963

Deputy Prime Minister of Italy
- In office 4 December 1963 – 24 June 1968
- Prime Minister: Aldo Moro
- Preceded by: Attilio Piccioni
- Succeeded by: Francesco De Martino
- In office 21 June 1945 – 13 July 1946
- Prime Minister: Ferruccio Parri; Alcide De Gasperi
- Preceded by: Palmiro Togliatti; Giulio Rodinò
- Succeeded by: Luigi Einaudi; Randolfo Pacciardi; Giuseppe Saragat

Minister of Foreign Affairs
- In office 12 December 1968 – 5 August 1969
- Prime Minister: Mariano Rumor
- Preceded by: Giuseppe Medici
- Succeeded by: Aldo Moro
- In office 18 October 1946 – 2 February 1947
- Prime Minister: Alcide De Gasperi
- Preceded by: Alcide De Gasperi
- Succeeded by: Carlo Sforza

Secretary of the Italian Socialist Party
- In office 16 May 1949 – 12 December 1963
- Preceded by: Alberto Jacometti
- Succeeded by: Francesco De Martino
- In office 22 August 1943 – 1 August 1945
- Preceded by: Giuseppe Romita
- Succeeded by: Sandro Pertini
- In office 18 April 1933 – 28 August 1939
- Preceded by: Ugo Coccia
- Succeeded by: Committee

Member of the Senate of the Republic
- Life tenure 25 November 1970 – 1 January 1980
- Appointed by: Giuseppe Saragat

Member of the Chamber of Deputies
- In office 8 May 1948 – 25 November 1970
- Constituency: Rome (1948–1958); Milan (1958–1970)

Personal details
- Born: 9 February 1891 Faenza, Emilia, Italy
- Died: 1 January 1980 (aged 88) Rome, Italy
- Party: PRI (1909–1921); PSI (1921–1980)
- Spouse: Carmen Emiliani (m. 1911; died 1966)
- Children: Giuliana; Eva; Vittoria; Luciana
- Profession: Journalist
- Awards: Stalin Peace Prize

Pietro Sandro Nenni (Italian: [ˈpjɛːtro ˈnɛnni]; 9 February 1891 – 1 January 1980) was an Italian socialist politician and statesman, the national secretary of the Italian Socialist Party (PSI) and senator for life from 1970 until his death. He was a recipient of the Stalin Peace Prize in 1951. He was one of the founders of the Italian Republic and a central figure of the Italian political left from the 1920s to the 1960s.

== Early life and career ==
Nenni was born in Faenza, in Emilia-Romagna. After his peasant parents died, he was placed in an orphanage by an aristocratic family. Every Sunday, he recited his catechism before the countess and if he did well, he received a silver coin, which he recalled as "generous but humiliating".

In 1908, Nenni became editor of a republican paper in Forlì. The socialist paper in the town was edited at the time by Benito Mussolini, later the Fascist dictator of Italy. In 1909 he entered political life by joining the Italian Republican Party. Nenni was arrested in 1911 for his participation in a socialist protest against Italy's imperialistic war in Libya alongside Mussolini and was imprisoned for seven months.

== First World War ==
When the First World War broke out, Nenni advocated the intervention of Italy in the war. In 1915, he volunteered for the Isonzo front. After he was wounded and sent home, he became an editor of the republican paper Mattine d'Italia. He defended Italy's participation in the war but tried not to alienate his socialist friends. In the last years of the war Nenni served at the front again.

When the war was over, Nenni founded, together with some disillusioned revolutionary ex-servicemen, a group called "Fascio", which was soon dissolved and replaced by a real Fascist body. While the socialist Mussolini became a fascist, the republican Nenni joined the Socialist Party in 1921 after its split with the wing that would form the Italian Communist Party (PCI).

In 1923, after the Fascist March on Rome, Nenni became the editor of PSI's official organ, Avanti!, and engaged in antifascist activism. In 1925 he was arrested for publishing a booklet on the fascist murder of Socialist leader Giacomo Matteotti. When the Avanti offices were set aflame and the paper prohibited in 1926, he took refuge in France, where he became secretary of the PSI.

== In exile ==
Nenni had worked in Paris as a correspondent of the Avanti in 1921 and had become acquainted with Léon Blum, Marcel Cachin, Romain Rolland and Georges Sorel. During his Parisian exile, Nenni made a decisive contribution to the survival of the Italian Socialist Party, which had moved abroad, and he worked for an alliance between the various anti-fascist parties which had been driven into exile. In 1935, he helped lead the Italian opposition to Mussolini's invasion of Ethiopia. Nenni went on to fight with the International Brigades in the Spanish Civil War, where he served as a company commander. He was the co-founder and the political commissar of the Garibaldi Brigade. After the defeat of the Spanish Republic and the victory of General Francisco Franco he returned to France. In 1943, he was arrested by the Germans in Vichy France and then imprisoned in Italy on the island of Ponza.

Nenni's third daughter, Vittoria, was active in the French resistance. She was captured and deported to Auschwitz, where she was murdered on 15 July 1943, aged 28. She is commemorated in the writings of Charlotte Delbo. After being liberated in August 1943, he returned to Rome to lead the Italian Socialist Party, which had been reunified as the Italian Socialist Party of Proletarian Unity. After the surrender of Italy to the Allied armed forces on 8 September 1943, he was one of the political officials of the National Liberation Committee, the underground political entity of Italian Partisans during the German occupation.

== Postwar politics ==
In 1944, Nenni became the national secretary of the PSI again, favoring close ties between his party and the PCI. After the Liberation, he took up government responsibilities, becoming Deputy Prime Minister and Minister for the Constituent Assembly in the government of Ferruccio Parri and the first government of Alcide De Gasperi. He was Minister for the Constitution, and in October 1946 he became Minister for Foreign Affairs in the second De Gasperi government.

The close ties between the PSI and the PCI caused the Giuseppe Saragat-led anti-communist wing of the PSI to leave and form the Italian Socialist Workers' Party in 1947 (later merged into the Italian Democratic Socialist Party, PSDI). During the early stage of the Cold War he opposed Italy's entry into NATO fearing that it could drag the country into a war between the two superpowers and reignite the Italian civil war and instead favoured a policy of neutrality. In 1951 he was awarded the Stalin Peace Prize.

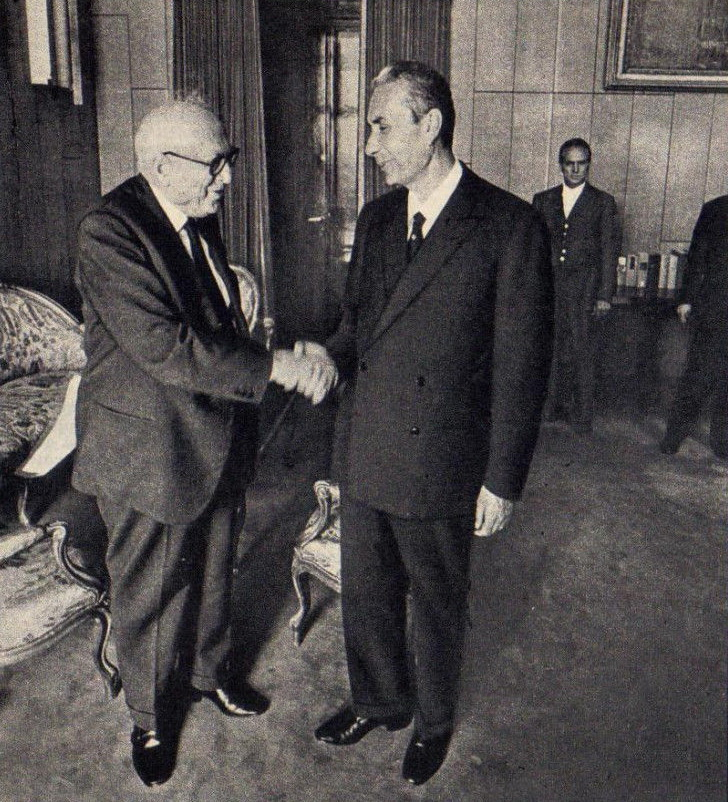
Nenni and Aldo Moro at Quirinale in Rome

In 1956, Nenni broke with the PCI after Soviet Union's invasion of Hungary. He returned the award and donated the Prize money ($25,000) to the International Red Cross. Subsequently, he slowly led his party into supporting membership of the North Atlantic Treaty Organization (NATO) and he sought co-operation with the leading party, the Christian Democrats.

== Opening to the centre-left ==
In the early 1960s, Nenni facilitated an "opening to the centre-left" enabling coalition governments between the PSI and the Christian Democrats and leading the socialists back into office for the first time since 1947. He formed a centre-left coalition with Saragat, Aldo Moro and Ugo La Malfa, and favored a reunion with the PSDI. From 1963 to 1968 he was Deputy Prime Minister in the three successive governments led by Moro and in December 1968 he became Minister for Foreign Affairs in the first government of Mariano Rumor, but resigned in July 1969, when the center-left alliance collapsed.

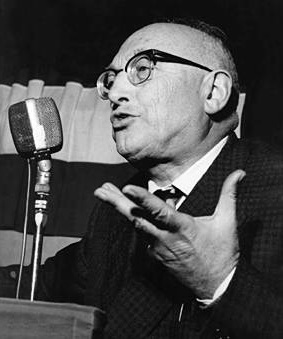
Nenni giving a speech

Although the reunification attempts between the socialists and Giuseppe Saragat's breakaway Social Democrats resulted in the formation of a joint list Unified PSI–PSDI, both parties fared poorly in the 1968 Italian general election. In 1969, a disillusioned Nenni virtually retired and Francesco De Martino took his place. He resigned as head of the PSI and was made a senator for life in 1970 and in 1971 he ran unsuccessfully for President of Italy. He died in Rome on 1 January 1980. He was an atheist.

== Electoral history ==
Election	House	Constituency	Party	Votes	Result
1946	Constituent Assembly	Rome–Viterbo–Latina–Frosinone	PSIUP	24,961	Elected
1948	Chamber of Deputies	Rome–Viterbo–Latina–Frosinone	FDP	57,020	Elected
1953	Chamber of Deputies	Rome–Viterbo–Latina–Frosinone	PSI	53,435	Elected
1958	Chamber of Deputies	Milan–Pavia	PSI	30,138	Elected
1963	Chamber of Deputies	Milan–Pavia	PSI	38,458	Elected
1968	Chamber of Deputies	Milan–Pavia	PSI	53,483	Elected

Political offices
Preceded by Palmiro Togliatti	Deputy Prime Minister of Italy; 1945–1946	Vacant
Preceded by Alcide De Gasperi	Minister of Foreign Affairs; 1946–1947	Succeeded by Carlo Sforza
Preceded by Attilio Piccioni	Deputy Prime Minister of Italy; 1963–1968	Vacant Title next held by Francesco De Martino
Preceded by Giuseppe Medici	Minister of Foreign Affairs; 1968–1969	Succeeded by Aldo Moro
Party political offices
Preceded by Ugo Coccia; Caretaker	Secretary of the Italian Socialist Party; 1931–1945	Succeeded by Sandro Pertini
Preceded by Alberto Jacometti	Secretary of the Italian Socialist Party; 1949–1963	Succeeded by Francesco De Martino
