= Giacinto Menotti Serrati =

Italian politician (1872–1926)

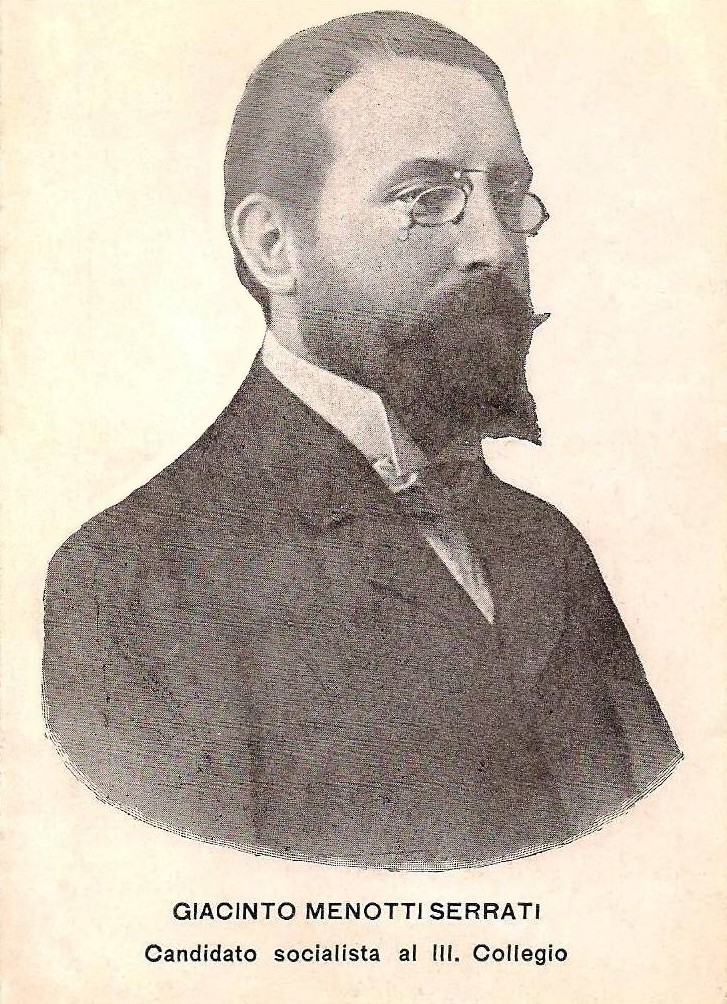

Giacinto Menotti Serrati (Italian: [dʒaˈtʃinto meˈnɔtti serˈraːti]; 25 November 1872 – 10 May 1926) was an Italian communist politician and newspaper editor.

== Biography ==
He was born in Spotorno. He was a central leader of the Italian Socialist Party (PSI), editor of the paper Avanti! (ever since he took over from ousted Benito Mussolini in 1914), and during the First World War he pushed the party to the left.

He was an active member of the Zimmerwald Movement and, after the October Revolution of 1917, Serrati led the PSI into joining the Comintern. During the Second Congress of the Comintern held in Moscow in 1920, Serrati served on its Presiding Committee and was also elected to the Comintern Executive Committee that year. However, in 1921 he opposed the Comintern principle of breaking with the reformists and remained head of the Italian Socialist Party during the split into an Italian Communist Party.

In 1924, he nonetheless led the left wing of the PSI into fusion with the Communist Party, being elected to the latter's Central Committee.

He died of heart failure in Asso in 1926, aged 54, on his way to an underground meeting of the Communist Party. His funeral represented the last major public demonstration of the labor movement before the enactment of the leggi fascistissime (fascist laws).
