= Glossary of Fascist Italy =

This is a list of words, terms, concepts, and slogans in the Italian language and Latin language which were specifically used in Fascist Italy and the Italian Social Republic.

Some words were coined by Benito Mussolini and other Italian Fascists. Other words and concepts were borrowed and appropriated, and other terms were already in use in Italy. Finally, some are taken from Italy's cultural tradition.

== A ==
- Africa Orientale Italiana - "Italian East Africa", the colony of the Italian Empire composed of present-day Eritrea, Ethiopia, and Somalia (except the disputed Somaliland until 1940) founded 1 June 1936 after the invasion and occupation of Ethiopia by Italy in which occupied Ethiopia, Italian Eritrea, and Italian Somalia were merged into a single colony. British Somaliland was briefly occupied and annexed to Italian East Africa from 1940 to 1941.
- Arditi - a group of elite soldiers used by Italy during World War I. The blackshirt and fez of the Arditi were adopted by the Italian Fascists as symbols of Italian Fascism.
- Azienda Generale Italiana Petroli, "General Italian Petroleum Company" - a petroleum joint-stock company created by the government of Fascist Italy in 1926 that amalgamated multiple petroleum companies in Italy.
- Aquila, Latin and Italian term for "eagle." The aquila was a symbol of the Roman Empire that was adopted by the Italian Fascist movement and Fascist Italy.
- Aristocrazia delle Trincee, "Aristocracy of the Trenches" - a concept developed by Mussolini during World War I that advocated a government led by veteran soldiers.
- Associazione Musulmana del Littorio - an organization of the National Fascist Party for people of the Islamic religion (especially in Italy's Muslim-populated colonies).
- Associazione Nazionale Fascista Famiglie Caduti in Guerra - National Fascist Families Association of Fallen in War.
- Avanguardia Giovanile Fascista - "Fascist Avande-Garde Youth" - a youth organization of the National Fascist Party existing from 1921 until 1937 when it was merged into the Gioventù Italiana del Littorio.

== B ==
- Battaglia del Grano - "Battle for Grain", economy policy intended to boost cereal production.

== C ==
- Camicie Nere - "Blackshirts", the paramilitary wing of the Italian Fascist movement. Named after their blackshirt uniform.
- Comitato Nazionale Forestale - "National Forest Committee", an environmental organization of the National Fascist Party, on the issue of the forests of Italy.
- Corporativismo - "Corporatism", referring to the fascist economic corporatism advocated by the Italian Fascist movement and adopted by other fascist movements. Fascist corporatism was a form of tripartism between the state, manager's unions, and labour unions in which the manager and labour unions negotiate to set wages and prices with the state being an arbitrator should unresolved disputes arise. The concept of corporatism pre-existed fascism and has been used by a variety of political ideologies.
- Credere, obbedire, combattere - "Believe, obey, fight", an Italian Fascist slogan.

== D ==
- Duce, Dux - "Leader", referring to the leadership position of Mussolini over the Italian Fascist movement and after 1925, as the leader of the government of Italy. Mussolini, even before the fascist turn, was called duce by the most radical socialist circles for his role as a movement leader. The use of the term "duce" in reference to Benito Mussolini during his militancy in the Italian Socialist Party dates back at least to the early years of 1910-1914, when he was a leading figure in the revolutionary socialist movement and director of the socialist newspaper Avanti!. In those years, the term duce was used in the socialist sphere to indicate charismatic or influential leaders, without the authoritarian connotation that it would later assume.
- Dux (libro) - "Leader" (1926), a book by Italian Fascist figure Margherita Sarfatti in praise of Mussolini.

== E ==
- Eja, eja, alalà! - Italian equivalent of "hip, hip hourray!", it was used as an Italian Fascist slogan. However this motto is not originally from fascism, but fascism took it from the Arditismo of Gabriele d'Annunzio, the motto was used by d'Annunzio's Legionaries during the capture of Fiume d'istria now Rijeka. This motto was used both by militants of the fascist party and by the Arditi del popolo, a group of former Arditi shock troops of the Royal Italian army that was left-wing and anti fascist.
- Era Fascista - "Fascist Era", Fascist rule in Italy from 1922 to 1945. It is also a term used in Fascist Italy for an alternative official calendar reckoned from the March on Rome. For instance Anno XIV E.F. or "Year 14 of the Fascist Era" indicates the fourteenth year after the March on Rome, or 29 October 1935 to 28 October 1936 in the Gregorian calendar. Era Fascista dates were often used alongside Gregorian dates.
- Eritrea Italiana - "Italian Eritrea", the colony of Eritrea within the Italian Empire that existed from the 1880s to 1936. In 1936, Italian Eritrea was merged along with Italian Somalia and Italian-occupied Ethiopia into the combined colony of Italian East Africa.

== F ==
- Fascismo - "Fascism", the ideology of Italian Fascism and generic fascism across the world.
- Fasci all'Estero - "Abroad League", the organization of the National Fascist Party representing Fascist Italians outside of Italy.
- Fasci Italiani di Combattimento - "Italian League of Combat", the organization of the Italian Fascist movement from 1919 until 1921 when it was succeeded by the National Fascist Party.
- Fascio - "Fasces", a corporal punishment device carried by Lictors in ancient Rome composed of an axe and wood rods bounded together by straps. Fascio (singular) or fasci (plural) also refers to leagues in Italy of a variety of political orientation, including liberal, socialist, and nationalist fascio. It is a symbol of strength through unity and Italian national identity via connection to ancient Rome that was the premier symbol used by Italian Fascists.
- Fasci Femminili - "Women's Leagues", the women's organization of the National Fascist Party.
- Futurismo - "Futurism", an ideology created by Marinetti that advocated a total modernization of society in the economy, politics, and culture, supported elimination of all old antiquated traditions, opposed democracy, supported political violence as being normal in society, and opposed feminism. Futurist ideas and supporters were initially numerous in the Italian Fascist movement, Marinetti co-wrote the Manifesto of the Fasci di Combattimento. However Italian Fascist later attempts to appeal to conservatives alienated the futurists including Marinetti who left the party in opposition to its "conservatization" in his view. In spite of this departure however Italian Fascist era art often mixed futurist themes with Romanità themes.

== G ==
- Gerarca - higher officer of the National Fascist Party
- Gioventù Albanese del Littorio - "Albanian Lictor Youth", a subsection of the Gioventù Italiana del Littorio for Albanian population of the Albanian Kingdom within the Italian Empire.
- Gioventù Araba del Littorio - "Arab Lictor Youth", a subsection of the Gioventù Italiana del Littorio for the Arab population of the Italian Empire.
- Gioventù Italiana del Littorio - "Italian Lictor Youth", the youth organization of the National Fascist Party founded in 1937 as a successor to the National Balilla Club and other Italian Fascist youth organizations.
- Giovinezza - The official hymn of the Italian National Fascist Party, regime, and army, and the unofficial national anthem of Italy between 1924 and 1943.
- Governatorato di Dalmazia - Italian province created from occupied Yugoslav territories after the Axis invasion of Yugoslavia in April 1941.
- Gruppo Universitari Fascisti - "Fascist University Group", a student organization of the National Fascist Party.
- Guardia Nazionale Repubblicana - "National Republican Guard", the Blackshirt paramilitary force of the Italian Social Republic formed as a successor to the Carabinieri and the National Security Volunteer Militia of the Fascist regime in the Kingdom of Italy.

== I ==
- Impero Italiano - "Italian Empire", the term unofficially used since the 1880s and officially adopted in 1936 by Fascist Italy after the Second Italo-Abyssinian War for Italy and its imperial possessions.
- Istituto Nazionale di Cultura Fascista - "National Institute of Fascist Culture", the cultural organization of the National Fascist Party and Fascist Italy, founded in 1926 and dissolved in 1943.
- Italia Fascista - "Fascist Italy", the term used by Italian Fascists and non-fascists for Italy under the rule of fascism. Two states were known as Fascist Italy: the Kingdom of Italy from 1922 to 1943 and the Italian Social Republic from 1943 to 1945.
- Italia Imperiale - "Imperial Italy", the Fascist project for securing dominion over the Mediterranean area.
- Italia Irredenta - "Unredeemed Italy", the term used by Italian irredentists who advocated the unification or "return" of claimed former Italian-held, Italian-populated, or Italian-cultured territories to Italy such as Corsica, Dalmatia, Nice, Savoy, and Ticino.
- Italianità - "Italianness", the concept of a common type, nature and character of all Italians. The term was coined during the Risorgimento, and was heavily promoted by the Fascist regime especially in the context of Italianization of territories gained by Italy after the First World War (e.g. South Tyrol).
- Italianizzazione - "Italianization", cultural assimilation of non-Italians or partially Italian peoples into Italian culture and society.

== L ==
- La dottrina del Fascismo - "The Doctrine of Fascism" (1932) - a book describing Italian Fascist ideology written by Giovanni Gentile but with credit given to Mussolini.
- La difesa della razza - "The Charter of Race", the racial policy adopted by Fascist Italy in 1938 that included antisemitic policies, including removed citizenship from Italian Jews, banning Jews from taking positions in the government or other professions such as in banking and education, marriages between Italians and Jews were forbidden, and Jewish private property was confiscated. The Charter also targeted native Africans, forbidding marriage between Italians and native Africans, and imposing racial segregation of Italians from blacks in its colonies.
- Lega Navale Italiana, an organization pre-existing Fascist Italy that was founded in 1907 that was assimilated into the Italian Fascist movement and made a Fascist organization of the Regia Marina in Fascist Italy.
- Libro e moschetto - Fascista perfetto - "Book and rifle make the perfect Fascist", an Italian Fascist slogan.
- Libia Italiana - "Italian Libya", the colony of Libya within the Italian Empire that existed from 1911 to 1943. In 1938, Fascist Italy made the Mediterranean shore of Libya provinces of Italy, as opposed to colonial provinces, that were to be settled by Italians.

== M ==
- Marcia su Roma - "March on Rome", the march of Italian Fascists on Rome that resulted in the appointment of Mussolini as Prime Minister of Italy in 1922.
- Mare Nostrum - "Our Sea", a Latin term used by the Roman Empire for the Mediterranean Sea that was adopted by the Italian Fascists as advocating Italian domination of the Mediterranean just as the Roman Empire had done.
- Massaie Rurali - the fascist women's organization of rural or peasant women.
- Me ne frego - "I don't care", "I don't give a damn", an Italian Fascist slogan. Also used in a 1936 song of the same name.
- Milizia Volontaria per la Sicurezza Nazionale - "National Security Voluntary Militia", the official organization created by Fascist Italy that composed the Blackshirts as a militia of the state.

== N ==
- Nazionalismo italiano - "Italian nationalism", the main core ideological basis of the Italian Fascist movement.
- Novecento Italiano - an Italian art form adopted during the Fascist era that emphasized a call to order in society.

== O ==
- Opera Nazionale Balilla - "National Balilla Club", a youth organization of the National Fascist Party.
- Opera Nazionale Dopolavoro - "National Recreational Club", a leisure and recreational organization of the National Fascist Party.
- Organizzazione per la Vigilanza e la Repressione dell'Antifascismo - "Organization for Vigilance and Repression of Anti-Fascism", the secret police of Fascist Italy.

== P ==
- Partito Fascista Albanese - the branch of the National Fascist Party in the Italian protectorate of the Albanian Kingdom.
- Partito Fascista Repubblicano - "Republican Fascist Party", the successor to the National Fascist Party that held power in the Italian Social Republic from 1943 to 1945, after the monarchy of the Kingdom of Italy ousted Mussolini and the National Fascist Party from power in 1943.
- Partito Nazionale Fascista - "National Fascist Party", the Italian Fascist political party founded in 1921 as the successor to the Fasci Italiani di Combattimento.
- Podestà
- Potenze dell'Asse - "Axis Powers", the alliance including Fascist Italy, Nazi Germany, the Empire of Japan, and other states that fought against the Allied Powers during World War II.
- Provincia Autonoma di Lubiana - "Autonomous province of Ljubljana". Province created of occupied Yugoslav territories after the Axis invasion of Yugoslavia.

== Q ==
- Quarta Sponda - "The Fourth Shore", Italian Libya.

== R ==
- Reale Unione Aeronautica Fascista - "Royal Fascist Aeronautical Union", the aeronautical organization of the National Fascist Party.
- Regno Albanese - "Albanian Kingdom", the Italian protectorate of Albania existing from 1939 to 1943.
- Regno d'Italia - "Kingdom of Italy", the Italian state existing from 1861 to 1946 that held the entire Italian Peninsula. It was the first manifestation of Fascist Italy from 1922, with the appointment of Mussolini as prime minister by King Victor Emmanuel III, until 1943 when Emmanuel III removed Mussolini as prime minister and banned the National Fascist Party.
- Repubblica Sociale Italiana - "Italian Social Republic", the client state of Nazi Germany existing from 1943 to 1945. It was founded after the ousting from power, arrest, and rescue by German forces of Mussolini in the Kingdom of Italy. It was completely dependent on German economic and military assistance as it faced invasion by the Allies. It was the second and final manifestation of Fascist Italy.
- Romanità - "Roman-ness" or "Roman Ideal", the concept of Roman identity of Italians utilized by Italian nationalists, including Italian Fascists that emphasized the connection of Italy and Italians to culture of ancient Rome and especially the Roman Empire.

== S ==
- Sansepolcrismo - Term used to refer to Italian Fascist supporters who are known as the original supporters of the movement. The Sansepolcrismo are persons claiming to have attended the rally organized by Mussolini at Piazza San Sepolcro in Milan on March 23, 1919, where he proclaimed the principles of Fascism.
- Sezione Operaie e Lavoranti a Domicilio - the 'Section for Female Laborers and Home-workers', a women's organization of the Fascist Party.
- Sindacalismo nazionale - "National syndicalism", Mussolini's concept of a united corporatist Italy.
- Somalia Italiana - "Italian Somalia", the colony of Italian-held territories of Somalia within the Italian Empire that existed from the 1880s to 1936. In 1936, Italian Somalia was merged along with Italian Eritrea and Italian-occupied Ethiopia into the combined colony of Italian East Africa.
- Spazio vitale - "vital space", a territorial expansionist policy of Fascist Italy that advocated expansion of Italian national territory to spread Italians into the Balkans and Africa to overcome problems of overpopulation in Italy. A similar policy was advocated by Nazi Germany called Lebensraum ("living space")
- Squadristi - "Squads", another name for the Blackshirts (see: Camicie Nere).

== U ==
- Unione Nazionale Ufficiali in Congedo d'Italia - "Official National Union of the On-Leave in Italy", an organization of soldiers on-leave that was dedicated to their moral and technical preparation to be on leave.

== List of abbreviations and acronyms ==
See the glossary above for full explanations of the terms.

- AGF - Avanguardia Giovanile Fascista, or Fascist Avand-Garde Youth
- AGIP - Azienda Generale Italiana Petroli, or General Italian Petroleum Company
- AML - Associazione Musulmana del Littorio, or Lictor Muslim Association
- ANFFCG - Associazione Nazionale Fascista Famiglie Caduti in Guerra, or National Fascist Families Association of Fallen in War
- AOI - Africa Orientale Italiana, or Italian East Africa
- CCNN - Camicie Nere, or Blackshirts
- CMF - Comitato Nazionale Forestale, or National Forest Committee.
- EF - Era Fascista, or Fascist Era
- GIL - Gioventù Italiana del Littorio, or Italian Lictor Youth
- GNR - Guardia Nazionale Repubblicana, or National Republican Guard
- GUF - Gruppo Universitari Fascisti, or Fascist University Club
- INCF - Istituto Nazionale di Cultura Fascista, or National Institute of Fascist Culture
- LNI - Lega Navale Italiana, or Italian Naval League
- MVSN - Milizia Volontaria per la Sicurezza Nazionale, or National Security Voluntary Militia
- ONB - Opera Nazionale Balilla, or National Balilla Club
- OND - Opera Nazionale Dopolavoro, or National Recreational Club
- OVRA - Organizzazione per la Vigilanza e la Repressione dell'Antifascismo, or Organization for Vigilance and Repression of Anti-Fascism
- PFA - Partito Fascista Albanese, or Albanian Fascist Party
- PFR - Partito Fascista Repubblicano, or Republican Fascist Party
- PNF – Partito Nazionale Fascista, or National Fascist Party
- RSI - Repubblica Sociale Italiana, or Italian Social Republic
- RUAF - Reale Unione Aeronautica Fascista, or Royal Fascist Aeronautical Union
- UNUCI - Unione Nazionale Ufficiali in Congedo d'Italia, or Official National Union of the On-Leave in Italy
