= Arab fascism =

Arab fascism (Arabic: الفاشية العربية) is a far-right ideology combining fascism with Arab nationalism.

== History ==
The ideology emerged shortly after the First World War and grew during the interwar period. As the rise of Arab fascism was concurrent with Arab independence from the Ottoman Empire, Arab fascists' beliefs were very anti-Turkish. Arab fascism grew with support from Nazi Germany and Fascist Italy, and Arab fascists became increasingly antisemitic after the establishment of Israel. Arab fascism first grew in Syria, Lebanon, Iraq, Palestine, and Egypt. Some Arab fascists adhered to Arab-Islamic nationalism, while the rest were secular.

Michel Aflaq had purchased a copy of The Myth of the Twentieth Century, a book about Nazism. Ba'athism was described by Cyprian Blamires as being inspired by Arab fascism, although with the addition of socialism. Saddam Hussein has been described as a fascist or as being influenced by fascist ideology and state leaders like Adolf Hitler or Philippe Pétain. In 1941, Arab fascists in Iraq committed the Farhud, an antisemitic pogrom.

During the 1930s and subsequent decades, nationalist movements across the Arab world drew influence from European fascist ideologies, with this trend being actively promoted by both Italy and Germany. Mussolini strategically positioned himself as a promoter of Arab nationalism, particularly to expand Italian regional power. In Italian Libya, Italian authorities established a parallel Libyan Arab Fascist organization. Throughout the 1930s, antisemitic sentiment grew in various Middle Eastern regions as fascist and Nazi ideologies gained appeal among Arab nationalist leaders. Representatives from Syria and Iraq participated in the Nuremberg Party Congresses, and Mein Kampf was translated into Arabic multiple times. Three organizations demonstrated the most direct influence from European fascism: the Syrian People's Party (also called the Syrian National Socialist Party), Iraq's Al-Futuwwa youth organization, and Egypt's Young Egypt movement (known as the Green Shirts). These three shared common characteristics of anti-rationalism, anti-intellectualism, emotional appeal, and territorial expansionist goals. Sami Shawkat, who developed the ideological framework for the Futuwwa movement, promoted a vision of a unified "Arab nation" with expansionist ambitions.

The Rapid Support Forces is a Sudanese paramilitary force that originated from the Janjaweed that was used by the Sudanese government during the War in Darfur. They have been widely characterized as fascist and Arab supremacist.

== See also ==
- Al-Muthanna Club
- Free Arabian Legion
- Golden Square (Iraq)
- Islamofascism
- Mein Kampf in Arabic
- Muslim Association of the Lictor
- Relations between Nazi Germany and the Arab world
- Syrian Social Nationalist Party
- Kataeb Party
- Ziaism
- Farhud
