= Foro Italico =

Sport venues in Rome, Italy

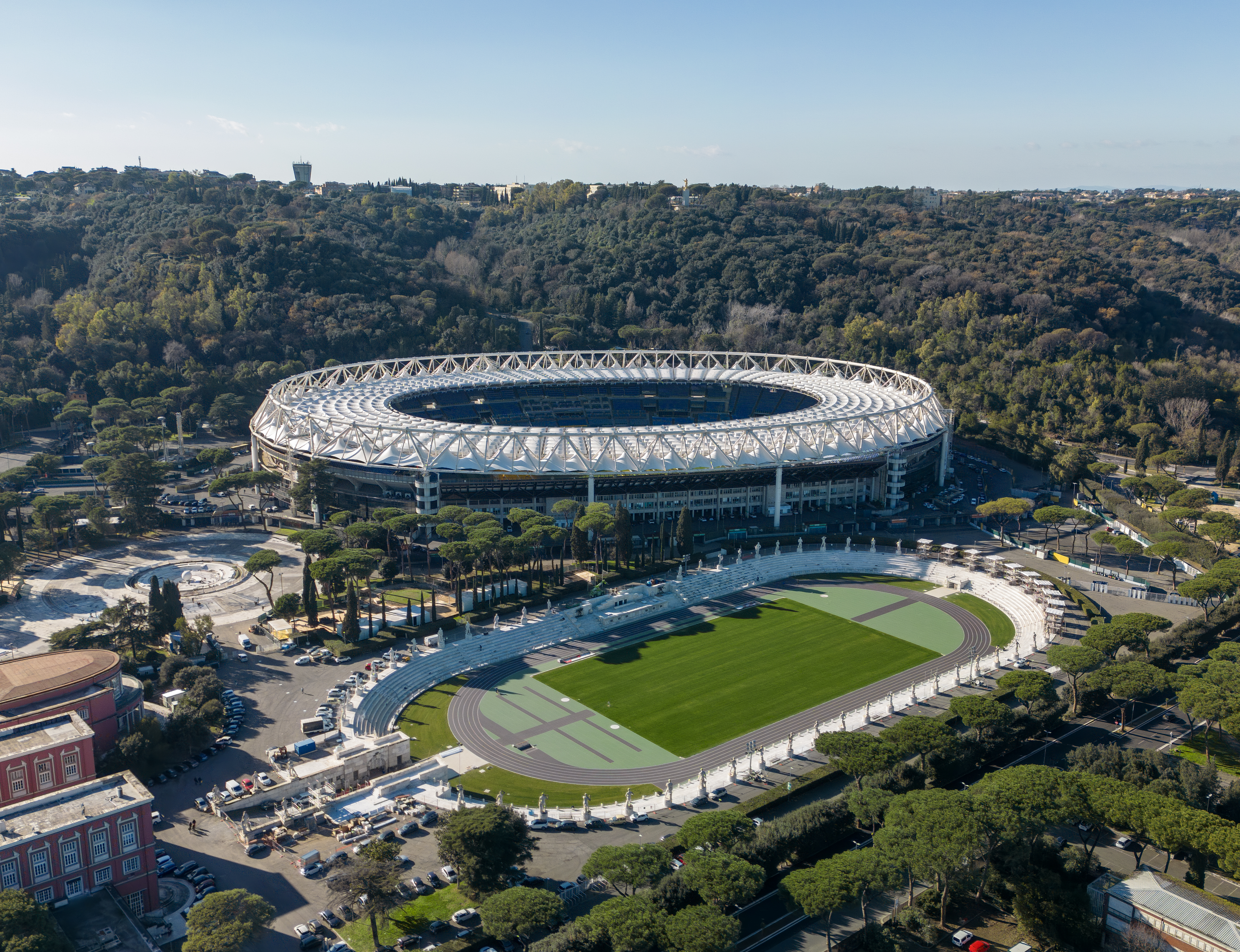
- Stadio Olimpico and Stadio dei Marmi (foreground)
- Interactive map of Foro Italico
- Location: Rome, Italy
- Coordinates: 41°55′52″N 12°27′23″E

Construction
- Opened: 4 November 1932
- Architects: Enrico Del Debbio, Luigi Moretti

Foro Italico is a sports complex in Rome, Italy, on the slopes of Monte Mario. It was built between 1928 and 1938 as the Foro Mussolini (literally Mussolini's Forum) under the design of Enrico Del Debbio and, later, Luigi Moretti. Inspired by the Roman forums of the imperial age, its design is lauded as a preeminent example of Italian fascist architecture instituted by Mussolini. The purpose of the prestigious project was to get the Olympic Games of 1940 to be organised by fascist Italy and held in Rome.

== History ==
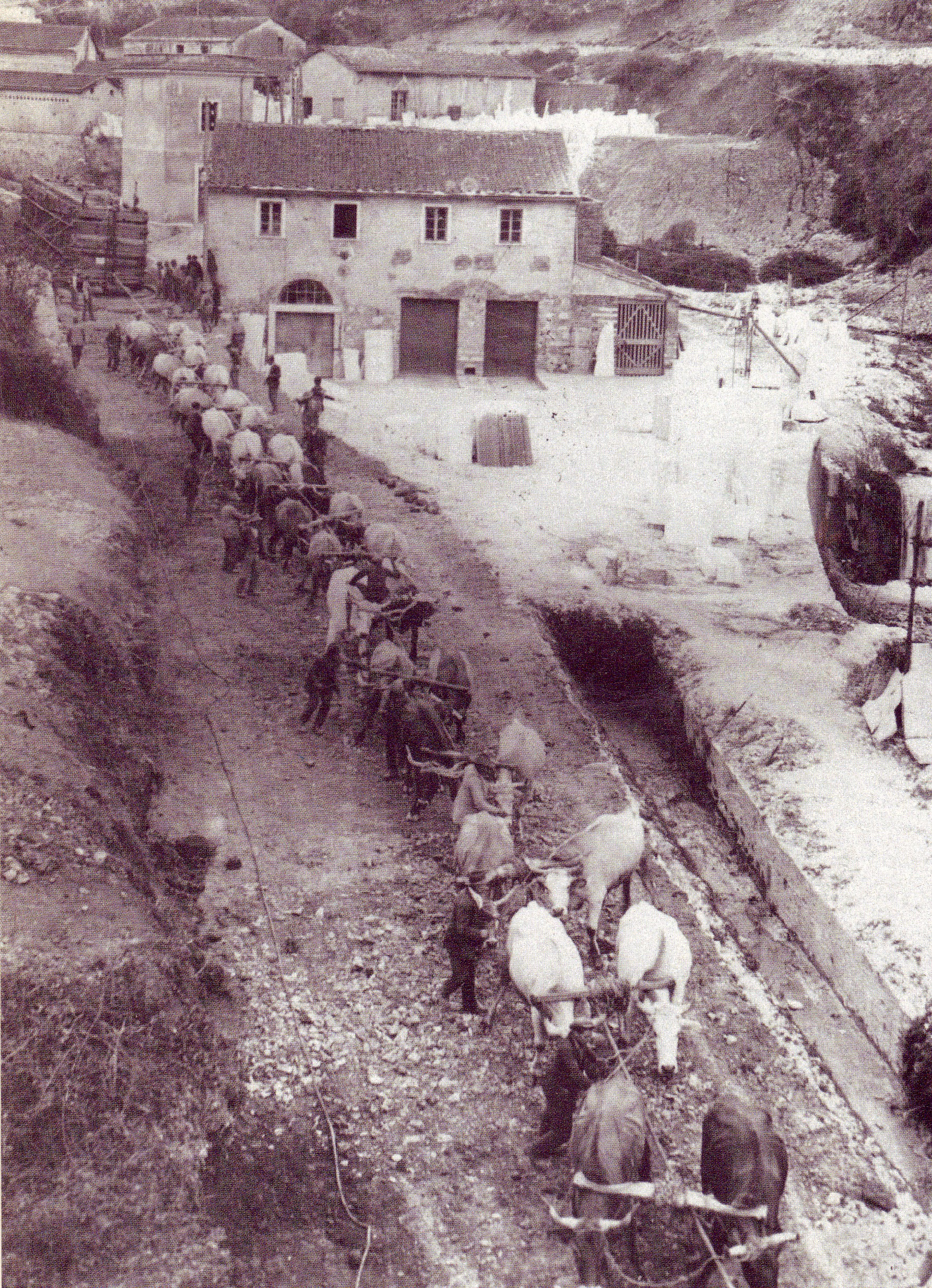
A phase of the transport of the Foro Italico monolith to the boarding place. The monolith was towed to Fiumicino on a pontoon, then it went up along the Tiber towed on the shore by oxen. It was the last major river transport in Rome.

The first buildings of the architectural complex were inaugurated on November 4, 1932: they were Palazzo H, the seat of the Fascist School of Physical Education; the so-called "Monolith"; the Stadio dei Marmi; the Stadio dei Cipressi (then Stadio dei Centomila and now Stadio Olimpico).

In 1936 and, subsequently, until 1941, Luigi Moretti - former author of the Accademia di scherma al Foro Italico in the Foro Mussolini - worked out designs that, while incorporating Del Debbio's urban plan, involved an expansion of the Foro towards Tor di Quinto; these designs were never put into practice.

== Description ==
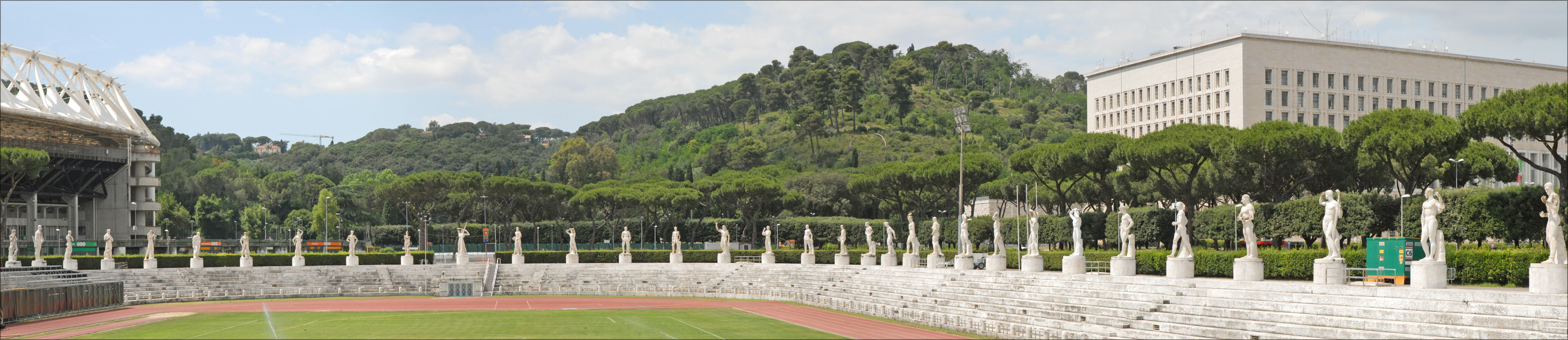
The Stadio dei Marmi surrounded by statues representing athletes.

The main entrance of the Foro is south-east, in line with the ponte Duca d'Aosta: here - on a wide avenue entirely covered with a mosaic made of black and white tesserae - rises a huge obelisk 17.5 meters high (excluding the base), carved in Carrara marble, known as Stele Mussolini.

The facility is decorated with statues, donated by the different Italian Provinces and therefore of different authors, which represent various sport activities: for example, the statue dedicated to javelin throw was donated by the Province of Perugia, while the one representing the so-called "ball with the bracelet" (an ancient Renaissance game) is due to the Province of Forlì-Cesena.

Near the Stadio Olimpico rises the Palazzo della Farnesina, the seat of the Ministry of Foreign Affairs since 1959, designed by the architects who won the architectural design competition: Enrico Del Debbio, Arnaldo Foschini, Vittorio Ballio Morpurgo.

The Foro is home to numerous sports venues, such as the largest sports facility in Rome, the Stadio Olimpico, the ornate Stadio dei Marmi and the adjoining building which is the seat of the Italian National Olympic Committee (originally built for the purposes of the Fascist Male Academy of Physical Education). Foro Italico also comprises an aquatics center built for the 1960 summer Olympics, the Stadio del Nuoto ("Swimming Stadium") and a tennis center.

The tennis center, which annually hosts the Italian Open, an ATP Masters 1000 and WTA 1000 event, is an extensive area with a total of 18 clay surface tennis courts, nine of which are used for the Italian Open tournament and the rest for training purposes. There are currently three stadium courts: the main one, Stadio Centrale, was rebuilt for the 2010 tournament and has a capacity of 10,400 spectators; the other grounds are the Stadio Nicola Pietrangeli (formerly Stadio Pallacorda), 3,500 seats, and the Grand Stand Arena.

Foro Italico has hosted important events, most notably the 1960 Summer Olympics. Since 2012, the Stadio Olimpico hosts the home games of the Italy national rugby union team at the Guinness Six Nations. Other live events like music concerts are also held at the various venues in the complex.

=== Sports venues ===
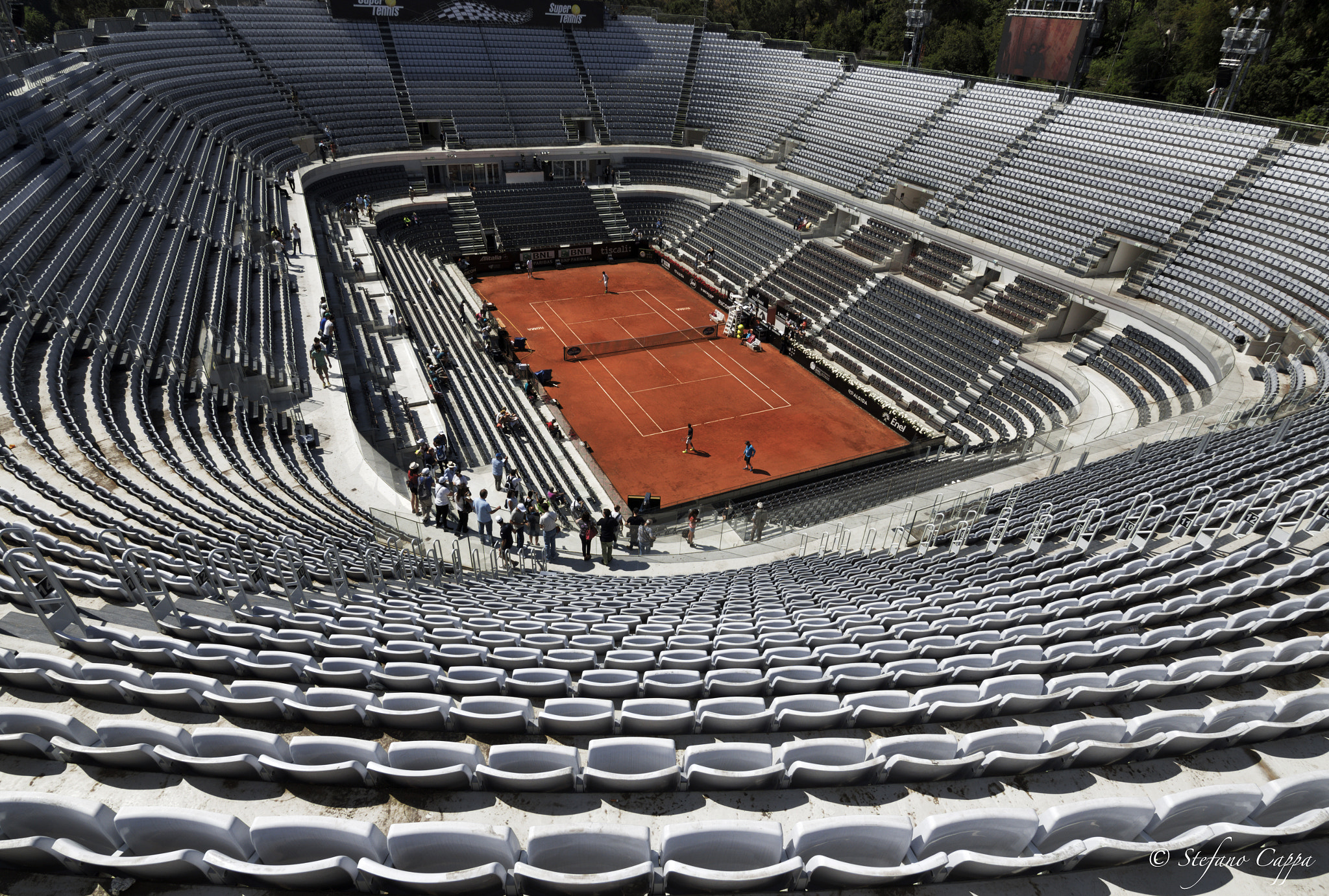
The main tennis court: Stadio Centrale del Tennis.

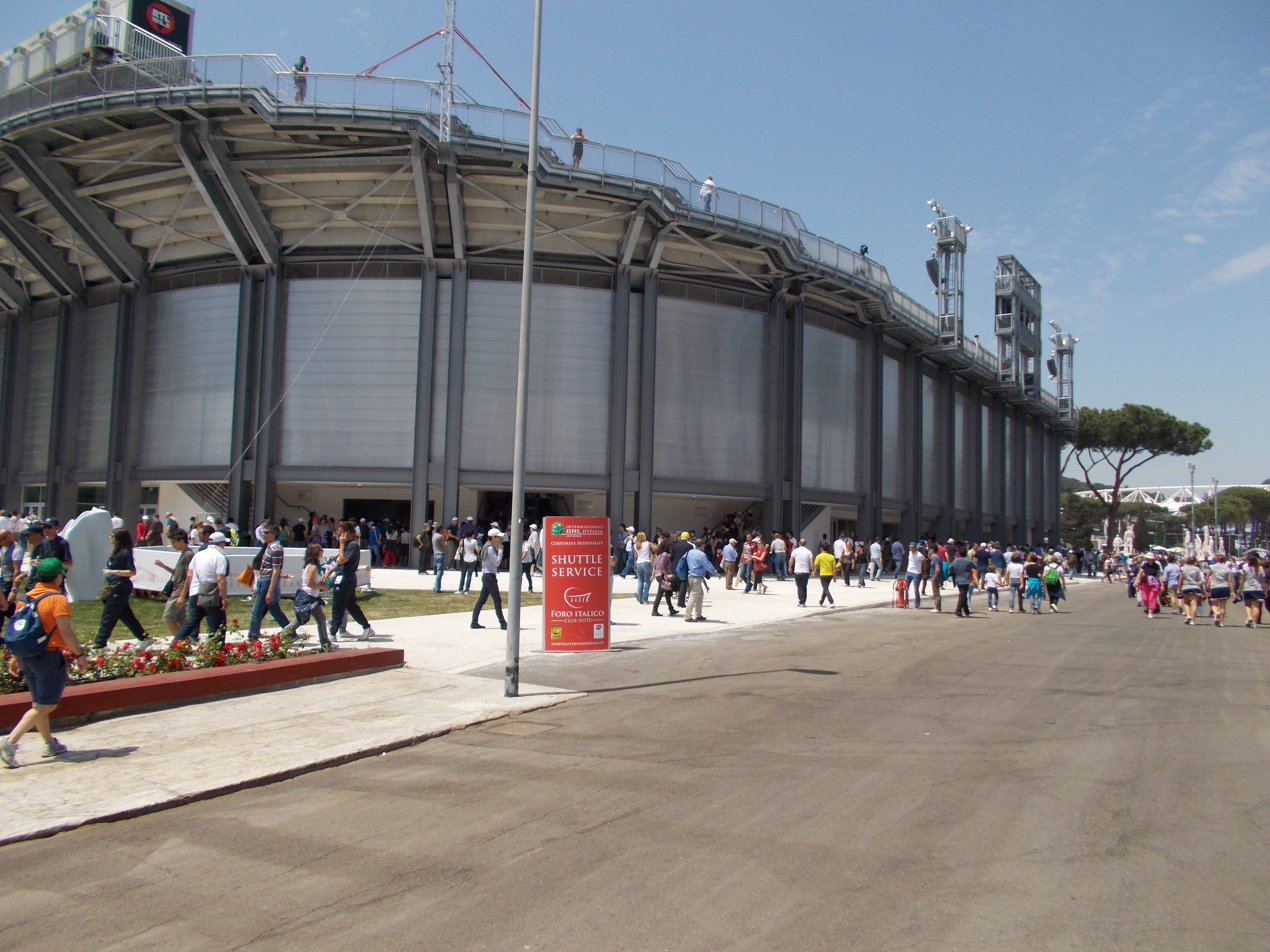
External view of the Stadio Centrale del Tennis.

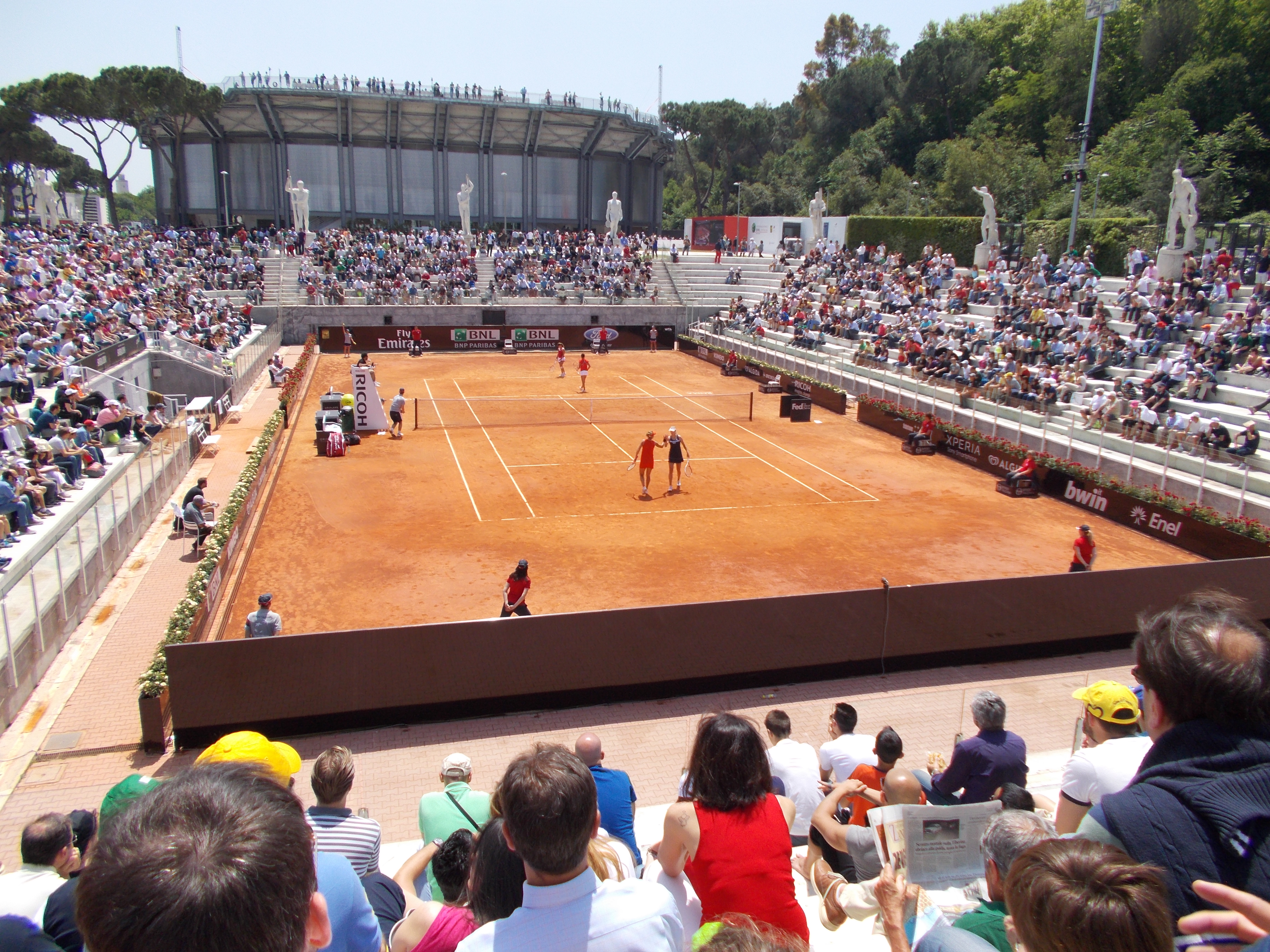
Stadio Nicola Pietrangeli, The tennis court named after Nicola Pietrangeli

- Stadio Olimpico
- Stadio dei Marmi
- Stadio Centrale del Tennis
- Stadio Olimpico del Nuoto

=== International sporting events ===
- 1960, Summer Olympics
- 1968, UEFA European Football Championship
- 1974, European Athletics Championships
- 1980, UEFA European Football Championship
- 1983, LEN European Aquatics Championships
- 1987, World Championships in Athletics
- 1990, FIFA World Cup
- 1994, World Aquatics Championships
- 2009, World Aquatics Championships
- 2011, Beach Volleyball World Championships
- 2021, Street Skateboarding World Championships
- 2021, UEFA European Football Championship
- 2022, LEN European Aquatics Championships
- 2024, European Athletics Championships

=== Walk of fame ===
On May 7, 2015 a walk called "The legends of Italian Sport - Walk of fame" has been inaugurated on Viale delle Olimpiadi. On this walk, 100 plaques were set bearing the names of former athletes who wrote the history of national sport chosen by the CONI Athletes Commission. Many personalities of Italian sport attended at the ceremony, chaired by the President of CONI, Giovanni Malagò. The President announced that in the following years the plates of other former Italian athletes of international importance would be added to the walk.

== See also ==
- List of tennis stadiums by capacity
- Fascist Male Academy of Physical Education
- Opera Nazionale Balilla (ONB)
- Gioventù Italiana del Littorio (GIL)
- Accademia fascista maschile di educazione fisica
- Foro Italico University of Rome
- Italian National Olympic Committee (CONI)

== Bibliography ==
- Marcello Piacentini, Il Foro Mussolini in Roma. Arch. Enrico Del Debbio , in "Architettura", February 1933, file II, pp. 65–75
- Mario Paniconi, Criteri informatori e dati sul Foro Mussolini , in "Architettura", February 1933, file II, pp. 76–89
- Organizzazioni e caratteristiche tecniche dell'opera , in "Architettura", February 1933, file II, pp. 90–105
- Casini-Cortesi, Mariella (November–December 2007). "Le figura femminile del Foro Italico". Monte Mario. 39 (248). Roma: Amici di Monte Mario: 1–4.
