= Accademia della Farnesina =

Centre for sport and political education in Fascist Italy

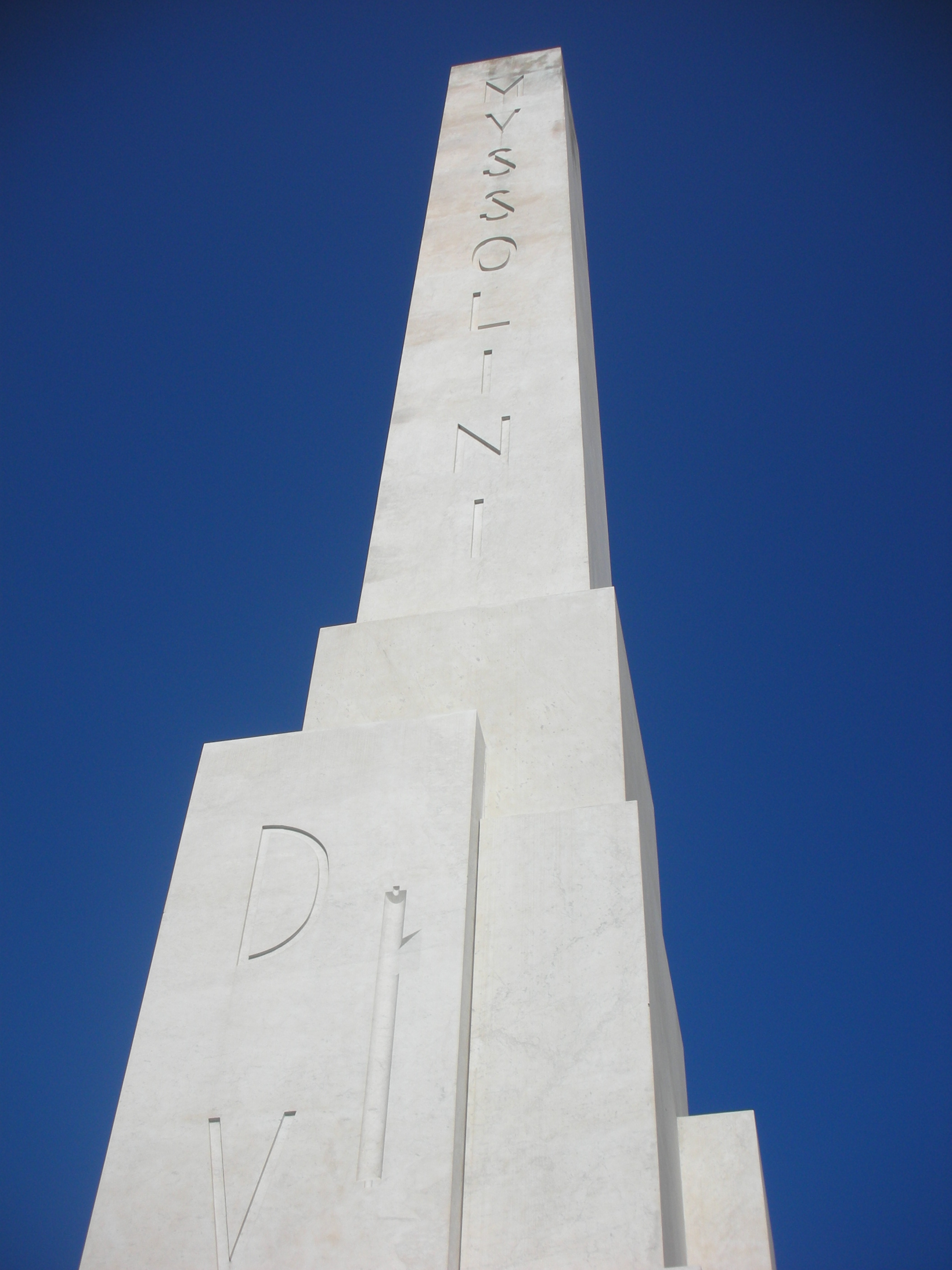
The Monolito at the Foro Italico

The Academia della Farnesina, also known as the Accademia fascista maschile di educazione fisica or Accademia fascista della Farnesina, was the most important centre for the education of the elites of the Fascist youth organizations in Fascist Italy.

== Fascist School of Physical Education ==
The Fascist School of Physical Education opened on 5 February 1928 and was initially hosted in the Farnesina, in the Military Academy of Physical Education, a centre aimed at training the sport and gymnastic instructors of the Royal Italian Army. This Institute would provide hospitality to the new school until the inauguration of its own facilities in November 1932. The primary objective of the Fascist School of Physical Education was to train the Physical Education teachers of the Italian schools and the sport instructors of the Opera Nazionale Balilla (ONB). However, the lack of youth leaders forced Renato Ricci, president of the ONB, to partially change the aims of the institute. Consequently, the school became the foremost centre for training male leaders of Fascist youth organisations.

== Opera Nazionale Balilla ==
The study programme at the Farnesina lasted two years. After obtaining their certificate, students undertook a nine-month apprenticeship. Following this, they were permanently employed by the Opera Nazionale Balilla. Throughout their studies, students took part in a variety of sports and gymnastics activities, as well as attending classes in subjects such as anatomy, physiology, first aid, traumatology, hygiene, psychology, Fascist law, philosophy, pedagogy, the history of physical education, art, singing, French and English.

One year after its inauguration, the school changed its name to Accademia fascista di educazione fisica (Fascist Academy of Physical Education). Ricci intended it to be 'the biggest educational experiment' ever undertaken in order to create the New Man. The institute was required to provide the Opera Nazionale Balilla with educators and leaders. From 1929 onwards, the Academy's programmes changed; all subjects deemed necessary for the political training of future leaders of youth organisations became essential. Students were assigned different roles according to their performance during the course. Some became teachers at the Academy, while those deemed most suitable for political activity became youth leaders. In November 1932, the Institute moved to its final location at 'Palazzo H' in the Foro Mussolini.

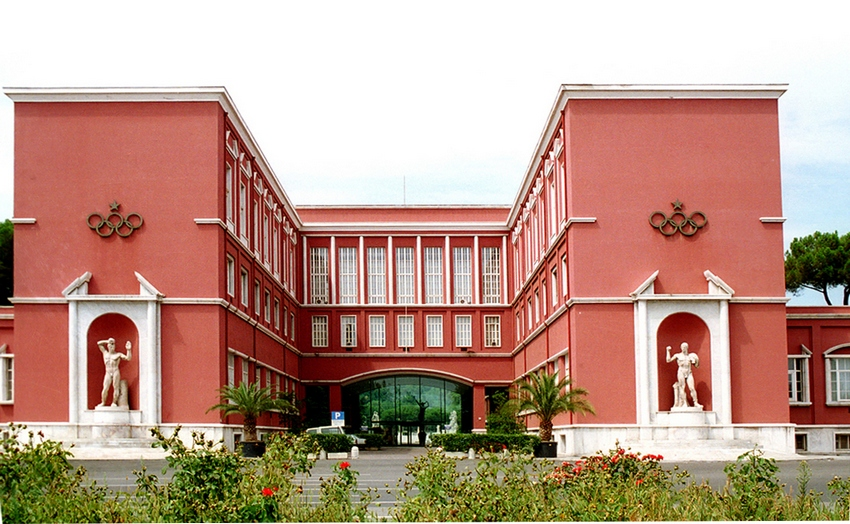
The Palazzo H in the Foro Italico, formerly the seat of the Accademia della Farnesina

The aims of the Institute were officially stated in two laws: Royal Decree 1.227 of 28 August 1931 and Royal Decree 1.592 of 31 August 1933. According to these legislative measures, the school was required to train and select the Fascist Youth leadership.

== Gioventù Italiana del Littorio ==
In 1937, the Fascist Youth Organization became a party organization and changed its name from Opera Nazionale Balilla to Gioventù Italiana del Littorio (GIL). Consequently, the academy also had to be reorganized. In April 1938, the General Command of the GIL appointed two commissions. Their aim was to draft new statutes and new programmes for the Fascist Academies of Rome and Orvieto. Following the recommendations of the two commissions, the Italian Parliament passed a new law (No. 866 of 22 May 1939) ordering both institutes to continue operating until the end of the Fascist regime. The Foro Mussolini Institute changed its name to 'Accademia della GIL'. Rather than being under the jurisdiction of the Ministry of National Education, the Academy now depended directly on the National Fascist Party. The courses were now extended to three years, and the study of the German language became mandatory in 1940. The subjects were divided into four categories: politics, the military, biology and science, and sport. Unlike other Italian schools, the Academy awarded its degrees in the name of the Duce, rather than the King.

In order to become a student at the Academy, it was necessary to pass a public selection process and demonstrate suitability in terms of morals, politics, race, personality and family background. Applications were not submitted by the aspiring students themselves, but by the local leaders of the Gioventù Italiana del Littorio, who selected the applicants they deemed most suitable to attend the Academy. After 1938, racial purity became an essential requirement, and Jewish students were expelled.

On 30 October 1940, Riccardo Versari, who had been the Academy's chancellor since its foundation, handed over his position to Nicola Pende. A prominent endocrinologist and leading figure in the development of somatotype and constitutional psychology in Italy, Pende was one of the scientists who signed the Manifesto of Race. He tried in vain to transform the academies in Rome and Orvieto into universities.

== Post-regime ==
After the fall of the Fascist regime on 25 July 1943, the GIL was dissolved, and the Accademia della Farnesina was closed. In the Repubblica Sociale Italiana (RSI), Renato Ricci created a new youth organization known as Opera Balilla and re-established the male and female academies respectively in Gallarate and in Castiglione Olona. When the war ended, many students who had been unable to complete their courses at the Fascist academies requested the opportunity to finish their training and obtain their final qualifications. In response, the Italian parliament passed a law establishing that these former students should be given the opportunity to pass their final exams by attending additional courses. This law enabled many students, particularly those expelled for racial reasons, to complete their studies. However, the law also stated that courses organised in the RSI and degrees granted by the academies of Gallarate and Castiglione Olona were not recognised by the Italian Republic. On 20 February 1951, the High Council of Public Education approved the regulation for the organization of the courses that took place in Rome from 1951 to 1954. The High Institute for Physical Education (ISEF) was established in Rome in 1953 to train physical education teachers, following a ministerial decree on September 18, 1952. It was not until 25 January 1967 that the Institute obtained permanent premises at the former GIL Music Academy, located at the Foro Italico (formerly the Foro Mussolini).

== Bibliography ==
- Betti, C. (1984). L’Opera nazionale balilla e l’educazione fascista. Florence: La Nuova Italia. ISBN 978-8822100771.
- Cammarata, A. (1932). Pedagogia di Mussolini. La scuola dell’Opera Nazionale Balilla. I corsi per i capi centuria e i Campi DUX. Palermo: Trimarchi.
- Cammarata, A. (1938). La scuola del fascismo. Appunti di pedagogia militante per gli educatori. Palermo: Trimarchi.
- Caporilli, M.; Simeoni, F. (1990). Il Foro Italico e lo Stadio olimpico: immagini dalla storia. Rome: Tomo Edizioni. ISBN 978-8871510033.
- Cian, V. (1933). Su l’Opera Nazionale Balilla, discorso pronunciato nella seduta del 4 aprile 1933-XI. Rome.
- Di Donato, M. (1985). "L'evoluzione storica della formazione del personale insegnante di educazione fisica in Italia (1847–1943)". Alcmeone. 8 (5–6): 175–179.
- Greco, A.; Santuccio, S. (1991). Foro Italico. Rome: Multigrafica. ISBN 978-8875971144.
- Koon, Tracy H. (1985). Believe Obey Fight: Political Socialization of Youth in Fascist Italy, 1922-1943. Chapel Hill: University of North Carolina Press. ISBN 978-0807816523.
- Morgan, T.B. (1932). Italian physical culture demonstration. New York: The Macfadden Company, Inc.
- Pica, A. (1937). Il Foro Mussolini. Milan: Bompiani.
- Piccoli, D.S. (1936). Le organizzazioni giovanili in Italia. Rome: Novissima.
- Ponzio, A. (2008). "A Forgotten Story: The Training for the Teachers of Physical Education in Italy during the Fascist Period". Sport in Society. 11 (1): 44–58. doi:10.1080/17430430701717681.
- Ponzio, A. (2008). "L’Accademia della Farnesina: un esperimento di pedagogia totalitaria nell’Italia fascista (1927–1943)". Mondo contemporaneo. 1: 35–66.
- Ponzio, A. (2009). "Die Führerschaftsausbildung in der Hitlerjugend und in den italienischen Jugendorganisationen". Quellen und Forschungen aus italienischen Archiven und Bibliotheken. 1: 489–511.
- Ponzio, A. (2009). "La formazione degli insegnanti di educazione fisica nel ventennio fascista". Lancillotto e Nausicaa. 26 (1): 36–47.
- Ponzio, A. (2009). La Palestra del Littorio. L’Accademia della Farnesina: un esperimento di pedagogia totalitaria nell’Italia fascista. Milan: Franco Angeli. ISBN 978-8856810653.
- Ponzio, A. (2015). Shaping the New Man. Youth Training Regimes in Fascist Italy and Nazi Germany. Madison: University of Wisconsin Press. ISBN 978-0299305802.
- Sacchetto, A. (1936). L’Opera Nazionale Balilla. Padua: Soc. Coop. Tip.
- Varese, F. (1992). "L'Accademia femminile di educazione fisica di Orvieto". Alcmeone. 5 (1): 34–39.
- Zapponi, N. (1982). "Il partito della gioventù. Le organizzazioni giovanili del fascismo 1926-1943". Storia contemporanea. 13 (4–5): 569–633.

== See also ==
Foro Mussolini virtual tour

- Gioventù Italiana del Littorio
- Opera Nazionale Balilla
- Foro Italico
