= Ethiopian Lictor Youth =

Ethiopian fascist youth organization

Ethiopian Lictor Youth (Italian: Gioventù Etiopica del Littorio, abbreviated G.E.L.) was a fascist youth organization in Ethiopia. Founded in 1936, GEL was modelled after the Gioventù Italiana del Littorio (the youth wing of the National Fascist Party) and the Arab Lictor Youth in Libya.

== History ==
Soon after the Italian occupation of Ethiopia, thousands of school-children were organized in GEL. Through GEL a free lunch program for children was set up. GEL had its own uniforms.

On May 24, 1937, a contingent of GEL paraded through Rome in connection with the twentieth anniversary of the Italian entry into the First World War. The GEL unit sang a specially composed song in honour of Il Duce, Benito Mussolini. Later renamed 'Indigenous Lictor Youth', Gioventù Indigena del Littorio in 1940, after the introduction of racial segregation laws in July 1938, GEL was never incorporated into the Italian mother organization. The organization was disbanded on orders from Rome after a brief existence.
