= Me ne frego =

Me ne frego is an Italian phrase meaning "I don't care" or "I don't give a damn". It may refer to:

- a slogan in Italian fascism
- "Me ne frego" (1936 song), an Italian song written by R. Prisco and E. A. Mario in 1936 and released by Odeon Records
- "Me ne frego", a 2020 song by Achille Lauro
