= National Fascist Party =

Italian political party (1921–1943)

National Fascist Party Partito Nazionale Fascista
- Abbreviation: PNF
- Governing body: Grand Council of Fascism
- Leader: Benito Mussolini
- Founded: 9 November 1921
- Dissolved: 27 July 1943
- Preceded by: Fasci Italiani di Combattimento
- Succeeded by: Republican Fascist Party
- Headquarters: Palazzo Braschi, Rome
- Newspaper: Il Popolo d'Italia
- Paramilitary wing: Action squads, Blackshirts
- Membership: approx. 800,000 (1923 est.)
- Ideology: Fascism (Italian)
- Political position: Far-right
- National affiliation: National Bloc (1921); National List (1924)
- Colours: Black
- Anthem: "Giovinezza" (lit. 'Youth')

Party flag

The National Fascist Party (Italian: Partito Nazionale Fascista, PNF) was a far-right, ultranationalist, and fascist political party in Italy founded by politician Benito Mussolini in 1921 as a political expression of Italian fascism, and as a reorganisation of the previous Italian Fasces of Combat. The party ruled the Kingdom of Italy from 1922, when Fascists took power with the March on Rome, until the fall of the Fascist regime in 1943, when Mussolini was deposed by the Grand Council of Fascism. The National Fascist Party was succeeded by the Republican Fascist Party in the territories under the control of the Italian Social Republic, and it was ultimately dissolved at the end of World War II.

The National Fascist Party was rooted in Italian nationalism and the desire to restore and expand Italian territories, which Italian Fascists deemed necessary for a nation to assert its superiority and strength and to avoid succumbing to decay. Italian Fascists claimed that modern Italy was the heir to ancient Rome and its legacy and historically supported the idea of continued expansion of the Italian Empire to provide spazio vitale ("living space") for colonisation by Italian settlers and to establish control over the Mediterranean Sea. The party also supported social conservative stances.

Fascists promoted a corporatist economic system, whereby employer and employee syndicates are linked together in associations to collectively represent the nation's economic producers and work alongside the state to set national economic policy. This economic system intended to resolve class conflict through collaboration between the classes. Moreover, the PNF strongly advocated autarky.

Italian Fascism, similarly to German Nazism, opposed liberalism, but did not seek a reactionary restoration of the pre-French Revolutionary world, which it considered to have been flawed, and not in line with a forward-looking direction on policy. It was opposed to Marxist socialism because of its typical opposition to nationalism, but was also opposed to the reactionary conservatism developed by Joseph de Maistre. It believed the success of Italian nationalism required respect for tradition and a clear sense of a shared past among the Italian people alongside a commitment to a modernised Italy, as well as a solid belief that Italy was destined to become the hegemonic power in Europe.

The National Fascist Party along with its successor, the Republican Fascist Party, are the only parties whose re-formation is banned by the Constitution of Italy: "It shall be forbidden to reorganize, under any form whatsoever, the dissolved Fascist party."

== History ==
=== Historical background ===
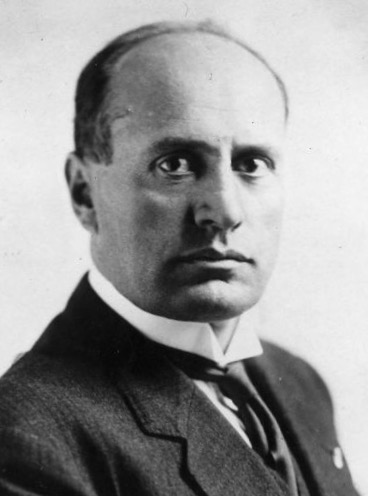
Mussolini during the 1920s

After World War I (1914–1918), despite the Kingdom of Italy (1861–1946) being a full-partner Allied Power against the Central Powers, Italian nationalism claimed Italy was cheated in the Treaty of Saint-Germain-en-Laye (1919), thus the Allies had impeded Italy's progress to becoming a "Great Power". Thenceforth, the PNF successfully exploited that perceived slight to Italian nationalism in presenting Fascism as best suited for governing the country by successfully claiming that democracy, socialism and liberalism were failed systems.

In 1919 at the Paris Peace Conference, the Allies compelled the Kingdom of Italy to yield to Yugoslavia the Croatian seaport of Fiume (Rijeka), a mostly Italian city of little nationalist significance, until early 1919. Moreover, elsewhere Italy was then excluded from the wartime secret Treaty of London (1915) it had concorded with the Triple Entente, wherein Italy was to leave the Triple Alliance and join the enemy by declaring war against the German Empire and Austria-Hungary in exchange for territories at war's end, upon which the Kingdom of Italy held claims (see Italia irredenta).

In September 1919, the nationalist response of outraged war hero Gabriele D'Annunzio was declaring the establishment of the Italian Regency of Carnaro. To his independent Italian state, he installed himself as the Regent Duce (Leader) and promulgated the Carta del Carnaro (Charter of Carnaro, 8 September 1920), a politically syncretic constitutional amalgamation of right-wing and left-wing politics – anarchist, proto-fascist and democratic republican ideas – which much influenced the politico-philosophic development of early Italian fascism. Consequent to the Treaty of Rapallo (1920), the metropolitan Italian military deposed the Regency of Duce D'Annunzio on Christmas 1920. In the development of the fascist model of government, D'Annunzio was a nationalist and not a fascist, whose legacy of political–praxis ("Politics as Theatre") was stylistic (ceremony, uniform, harangue and chanting) and not substantive, which Italian fascism artfully developed as a government model.

Founded in Rome during the Third Fascist Congress on 7–10 November 1921, the National Fascist Party marked the transformation of the paramilitary Fasci Italiani di Combattimento into a more coherent political group (the Fasci di Combattimento had been founded by Mussolini in Milan's Piazza San Sepolcro on 23 March 1919).

The Fascist Party was instrumental in directing and popularising support for Mussolini's ideology. In the early years, groups within the PNF called Blackshirts (squadristi) built a base of power by violently attacking socialists and their institutions in the rural Po Valley, thereby gaining the support of landowners. Compared to its predecessor, the PNF abandoned republicanism to turn decisively towards the right-wing of the political spectrum.

=== March on Rome ===
On 28 October 1922, Mussolini attempted a coup d'état, titled the March on Rome by Fascist propaganda, in which almost 30,000 fascists took part. The quadrumvirs leading the Fascist Party, General Emilio De Bono, Italo Balbo (one of the most famous ras), Michele Bianchi and Cesare Maria de Vecchi, organised the March while the Duce stayed behind for most of the march, though he allowed pictures to be taken of him marching along with the Fascist marchers. Generals Gustavo Fara and Sante Ceccherini assisted the preparations of the March of 18 October. Other organisers of the march included the Marquis Dino Perrone Compagni and Ulisse Igliori.

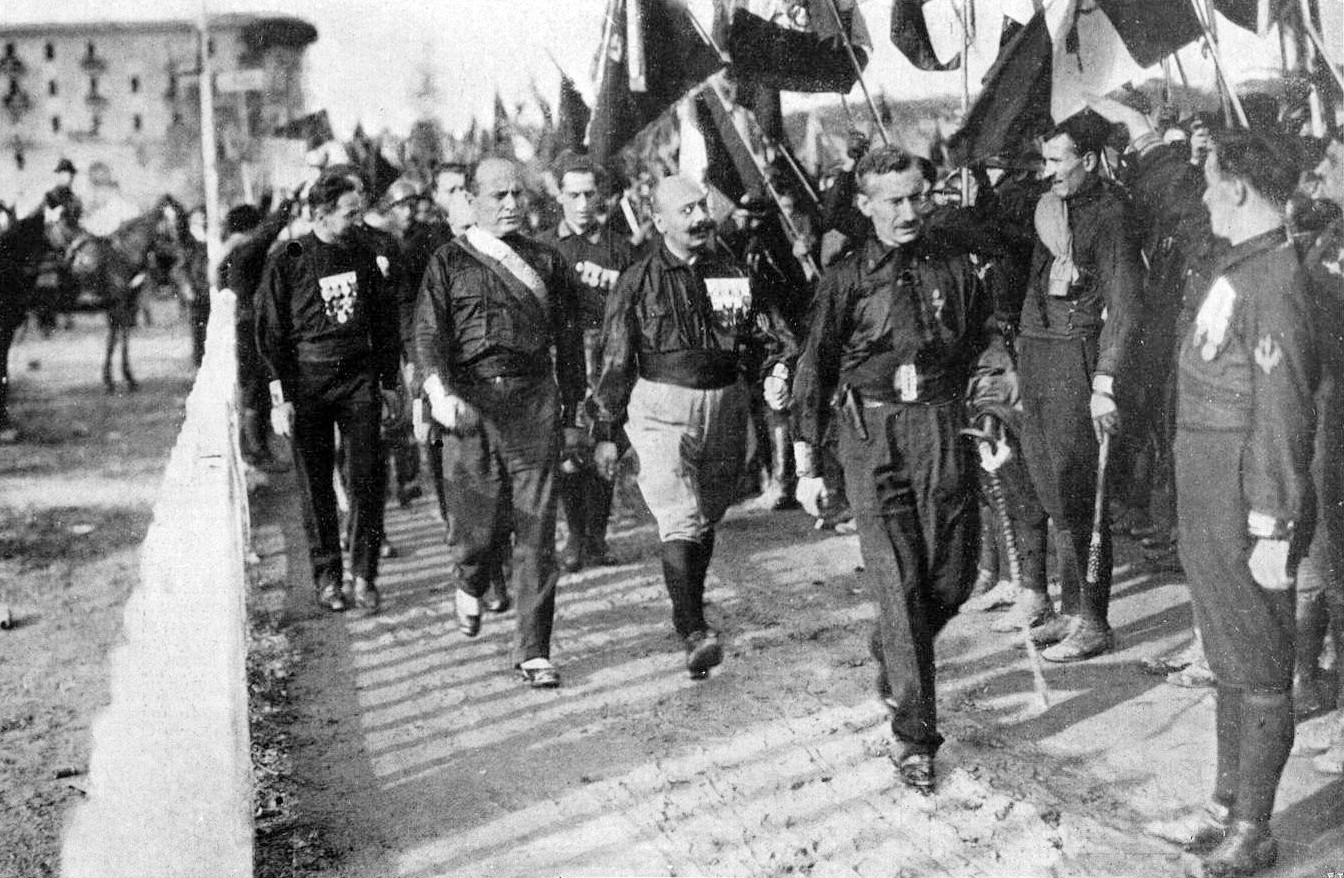
Benito Mussolini with Fascist Blackshirts during the March on Rome

On 24 October 1922, Mussolini declared before 60,000 people at the Fascist Congress in Naples: "Our program is simple: we want to rule Italy". Meanwhile, the Blackshirts, who had occupied the Po plain, took all strategic points of the country. On 26 October, former prime minister Antonio Salandra warned current prime minister Luigi Facta that Mussolini was demanding his resignation and that he was preparing to march on Rome. However, Facta did not believe Salandra and thought that Mussolini would govern quietly at his side. To meet the threat posed by the bands of fascist troops now gathering outside Rome, Facta (who had resigned the next day on 29 October 1922 but continued to hold power) ordered a state of siege for Rome. Having had previous conversations with the king about the repression of fascist violence, he was sure the king would agree. However, King Victor Emmanuel III refused to sign the military order. On 30 October, the King handed power to Mussolini, who was supported by the military, the business class, and the right-wing part of the population.

The march itself was composed of fewer than 30,000 men, but the King in part feared a civil war since the squadristi had already taken control of the Po plain and most of the country, while fascism was no longer seen as a threat to the establishment. Mussolini was asked to form his cabinet on 31 October 1922, while some 25,000 Blackshirts were parading in Rome. Mussolini thus legally reached power in accordance with the Statuto Albertino, the Italian Constitution. The March on Rome was not the conquest of power which fascism later celebrated, but rather the precipitating force behind a transfer of power within the framework of the constitution. This transition was made possible by the surrender of public authorities in the face of fascist intimidation. Many business and financial leaders believed it would be possible to manipulate Mussolini, whose early speeches and policies emphasised free market and laissez-faire economics. This proved overly optimistic, as Mussolini's corporatist view stressed total state power over businesses as much as over individuals, via governing industry bodies ("corporations") controlled by the Fascist party, a model in which businesses retained the responsibilities of property, but few if any of the freedoms.

Even though the coup failed in giving power directly to the Fascist Party, it nonetheless resulted in a parallel agreement between Mussolini and King Victor Emmanuel III that made Mussolini the head of the Italian government. On 15 December, the Grand Council of Fascism was founded and it was the supreme organ of the PNF.

=== Fascist government ===
After a drastic modification of electoral legislation (the Acerbo Law), the Fascist Party clearly won the highly controversial elections of April 1924. In early 1925, Mussolini dropped all pretence of democracy and set up a total dictatorship. From that point onward, the PNF was effectively the only legally permitted party in the country. This status was formalised by a law passed in 1928 and Italy remained a one-party state until the end of the Fascist regime in 1943. The new laws were strongly criticised by the leader of the Socialist Party Giacomo Matteotti during his speech in Parliament and a few days later Matteotti was kidnapped and killed by fascist blackshirts.

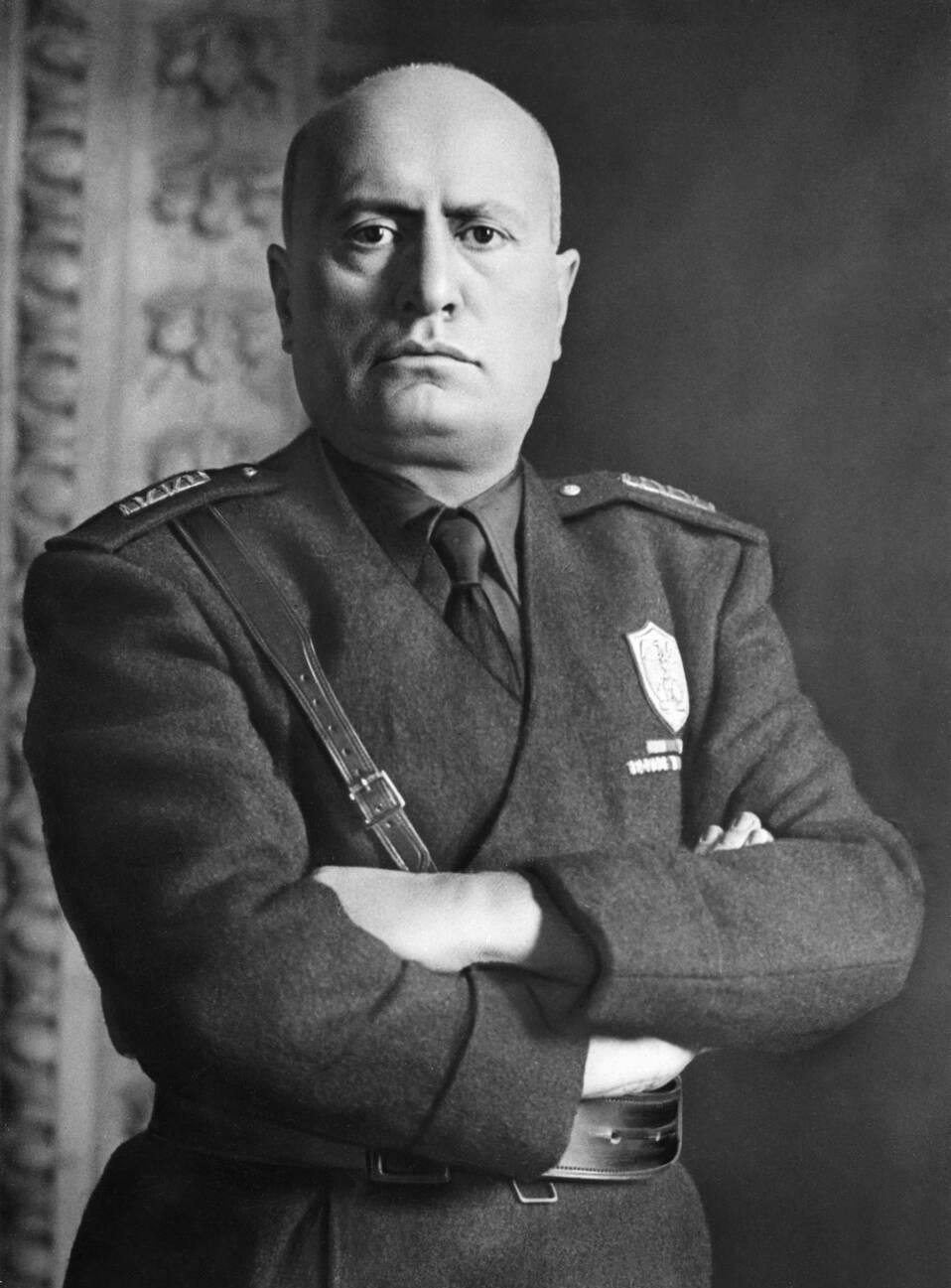
Mussolini in an official portrait

After taking sole power, the Fascist regime began to impose the Fascist ideology and its symbolism throughout the country. Party membership in the PNF became necessary to seek employment or gain government assistance. The fasces adorned public buildings, Fascist mottos and symbols were displayed in art and a personality cult was created around Mussolini as the nation's saviour called "Il Duce", "The Leader". The Italian parliament was replaced in duties by the Chamber of Fasces and Corporations, solely filled with Fascist Party members. The PNF promoted Italian imperialism in Africa and staunchly promoted racial segregation and white supremacy of Italian settlers in the colonies.

In 1930 came the Youth Fasces of Combat. The 1930s were characterised by the secretary Achille Starace, "faithful" to Mussolini and one of the few fascist secretaries from Southern Italy, who launched a campaign of Fascism in the country made up of a wave of ceremonies and rallies and the creation of organisations which aimed to frame the country and the citizen in all its manifestations (both public and private). To regiment youth movements, Starace brought the Opera Nazionale Balilla (ONB) under the direct control of the PNF and the Youth Fasces that were dissolved and merged into the new Gioventù Italiana del Littorio (GIL).

On 27 May 1933, party membership was declared a basic requirement for public office. On 9 March 1937, it became mandatory if one wanted access to any public office and from 3 June 1938 those who did not join the party could not work. In 1939, Ettore Muti replaced Starace at the helm of the party, a fact that testifies to the increasing influence of Galeazzo Ciano, the Minister of Foreign Affairs and son-in-law of Mussolini.

On 10 June 1940, from the balcony of Palazzo Venezia Mussolini announced the entry of Italy into World War II on the side of Hitler's Germany.

=== The Fall of Mussolini ===
On 25 July 1943, following a request from Dino Grandi due to the failure of the war the Grand Council of Fascism overthrew Mussolini by asking the King to resume his full authority in officially removing Mussolini as prime minister, which he did. Mussolini was imprisoned, and the Fascist organizations immediately collapsed and the party was officially banned by Pietro Badoglio's government on 27 July.

After the Nazi-engineered Gran Sasso raid liberated Mussolini in September, the PNF was revived as the Republican Fascist Party (Partito Fascista Repubblicano – PFR; 13 September), as the single party of the Northern and Nazi-protected Italian Social Republic (the Salò Republic). Its secretary was Alessandro Pavolini. The PRF did not outlast Mussolini's execution and the disappearance of the Salò state in April 1945, amidst the final Allied offensive in Italy.

== Organisations ==
The National Fascist Party maintained several subordinate organisations that extended its reach across Italian society, from paramilitary street fighters to youth movements, women's groups and overseas diaspora networks.

=== Paramilitary wings ===
The party's earliest paramilitary force consisted of the action squads (squadristi), the Blackshirt street fighters who violently suppressed socialist organisations in the early 1920s and were instrumental in the March on Rome. Following the March, these were formalised into the Milizia Volontaria per la Sicurezza Nazionale (MVSN), or Blackshirts, by royal decree in January 1923, bringing the squads under state authority while keeping them tied to the party.

=== Youth and student wings ===
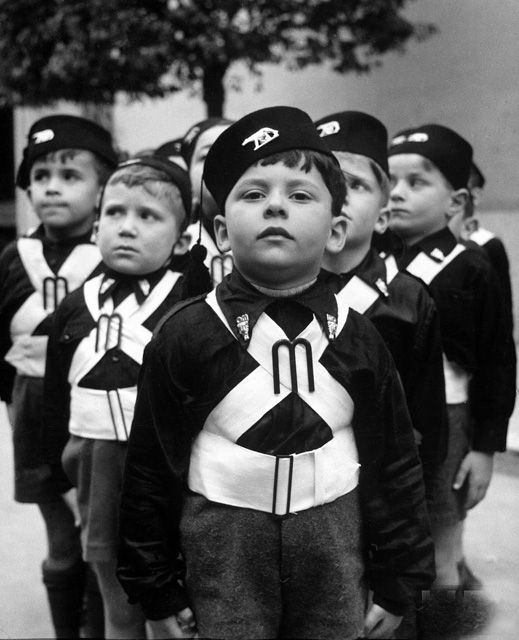
Boys in Balilla uniform, 1936

Youth organisation was central to the regime's ambition to mould a new generation of Fascist Italians. The Avanguardia Giovanile Fascista (AGF) served as the party's initial youth wing, established in the 1920s. It was superseded in 1926 by the Opera Nazionale Balilla (ONB), established by law under the Ministry of National Education, with membership initially voluntary before being made compulsory for boys aged 6 to 18 and girls aged 8 to 14. The ONB was brought under direct PNF control by secretary Achille Starace in the 1930s, and in 1937 was absorbed into the Gioventù Italiana del Littorio (GIL), which was established to replace the ONB and supervise the minds of all youths, directed effectively against the influence of the Catholic Church on the young. The GIL remained the sole official youth organisation until the fall of the regime in 1943. University-age members were organised separately throughout this period by the Gruppi Universitari Fascisti (GUF), founded in 1922.

=== Women's wing ===
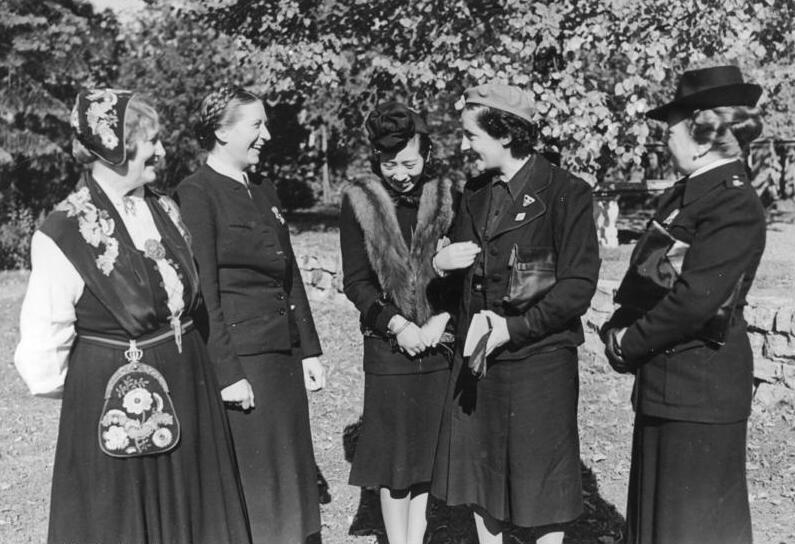
Representatives of international fascist women's organisations in Berlin, 1941; Olga Medici del Vascello of the Fasci Femminili is pictured second from right

The Fasci Femminili (FF) served as the party's women's organisation, founded informally in 1919 and formally constituted in 1920. While the regime's ideology cast women primarily as mothers and reproducers of the nation, the FF mobilised women in support of party activities, welfare work, and propaganda. It incorporated several subordinate sections, including the Opera Nazionale Maternità ed Infanzia (ONMI), established in 1925 to support mothers and children, the Massaie Rurali (MR) for rural working-class women, founded in 1933, and the Sezione Operaie e Lavoranti a Domicilio (SOLD) for urban female labourers, founded in 1937. By 1939 the FF had 750,000 members.

=== Overseas wing ===
The Fasci Italiani all'Estero extended the party's presence beyond Italy's borders, organising Italian emigrant communities abroad. These overseas fasci served both as a means of maintaining cultural and political ties with the Italian diaspora and as vehicles for spreading Fascist ideology internationally. Balilla units were also established in some territories outside Italy, including in Malta, then a British colony, where Maltese nationalists created a unit, and in Marseille, where one was implemented within the local Casa d'Italia; both were disbanded with the outbreak of the Second World War.

=== Colonial affiliates ===
The PNF established affiliated organisations within Italy's colonial empire. Following the Italian invasion of Albania in 1939, the Albanian Fascist Party (Albanian: Partia Fashiste Shqiptare, PFSh) was constituted as a branch of the PNF, with members required to swear an oath of loyalty to Mussolini. It held nominal power in Italian Albania until the Armistice of Cassibile in 1943.

In Italian Libya, the Muslim Association of the Lictor (Italian: Associazione Musulmana del Littorio, AML) was founded on 9 January 1939 by Governor-General Italo Balbo as the Muslim branch of the PNF, following the extension of a special Italian citizenship to indigenous Libyans. Its corresponding youth organisation was the Arab Lictor Youth.

In Italian Ethiopia, the Ethiopian Lictor Youth (Italian: Gioventù Etiopica del Littorio, GEL) was founded in 1936, modelled after the GIL and the Arab Lictor Youth. Thousands of schoolchildren were enrolled shortly after the Italian occupation, and a GEL contingent paraded through Rome in May 1937 to mark the twentieth anniversary of Italy's entry into the First World War. Following the introduction of racial segregation laws in 1938, the organisation was renamed Gioventù Indigena del Littorio in 1940, though it was never incorporated into the Italian parent organisation and was eventually disbanded.

== Ideology ==
Italian Fascism was rooted in Italian nationalism and Georges Sorel's revolutionary syndicalism that eventually evolved into national syndicalism in Italy. Most Italian revolutionary syndicalist leaders were not only "founders of the Fascist movement", but later held key positions in Mussolini's administration. They sought to restore and expand Italian territories, which Italian Fascists deemed necessary for a nation to assert its superiority and strength and to avoid succumbing to decay. Italian Fascists claimed that modern Italy is the heir to ancient Rome and its legacy and historically supported the creation of an Italian Empire to provide spazio vitale ("living space") for colonisation by Italian settlers and to establish control over the Mediterranean Sea.

Italian Fascism promoted a corporatist economic system whereby employer and employee syndicates are linked together in associations to collectively represent the nation's economic producers and work alongside the state to set national economic policy. This economic system intended to resolve class conflict through collaboration between the classes.

Italian Fascism opposed liberalism, but rather than seeking a reactionary restoration of the pre-French Revolutionary world, which it considered to have been flawed as it had a forward-looking direction. It was opposed to Marxist socialism because of its typical opposition to nationalism, but was also opposed to the reactionary conservatism developed by Joseph de Maistre. It believed the success of Italian nationalism required respect for tradition and a clear sense of a shared past among the Italian people, alongside a commitment to a modernised Italy.

=== Italian nationalism ===
Italian Fascism is based upon Italian nationalism and in particular seeks to complete what it considers as the incomplete project of Risorgimento by incorporating Italia Irredenta ("unredeemed Italy") into the state of Italy. The National Fascist Party founded in 1921 declared that the party was to serve as "a revolutionary militia placed at the service of the nation. It follows a policy based on three principles: order, discipline, hierarchy".

It identifies modern Italy as the heir to the Roman Empire and Italy during the Renaissance and promotes the cultural identity of Romanitas ("Roman-ness"). Italian Fascism historically sought to forge a strong Italian Empire as a "Third Rome", identifying ancient Rome as the "First Rome" and Renaissance-era Italy as the "Second Rome". Italian Fascism has emulated ancient Rome and Mussolini in particular emulated ancient Roman leaders, such as Julius Cæsar as a model for the Fascists' rise to power and Augustus as a model for empire-building. Italian Fascism has directly promoted imperialism, such as within the Doctrine of Fascism (1932) ghostwritten by Giovanni Gentile on behalf of Mussolini, declared:

The Fascist state is a will to power and empire. The Roman tradition is here a powerful force. According to the Doctrine of Fascism, empire is not only territorial or military or mercantile concept, but a spiritual and moral one. One can think of an empire, that is, a nation, which directly or indirectly guides other nations, without the need to conquer a single square kilometre of territory.

— Benito Mussolini, Giovanni Gentile, Doctrine of Fascism (1932)

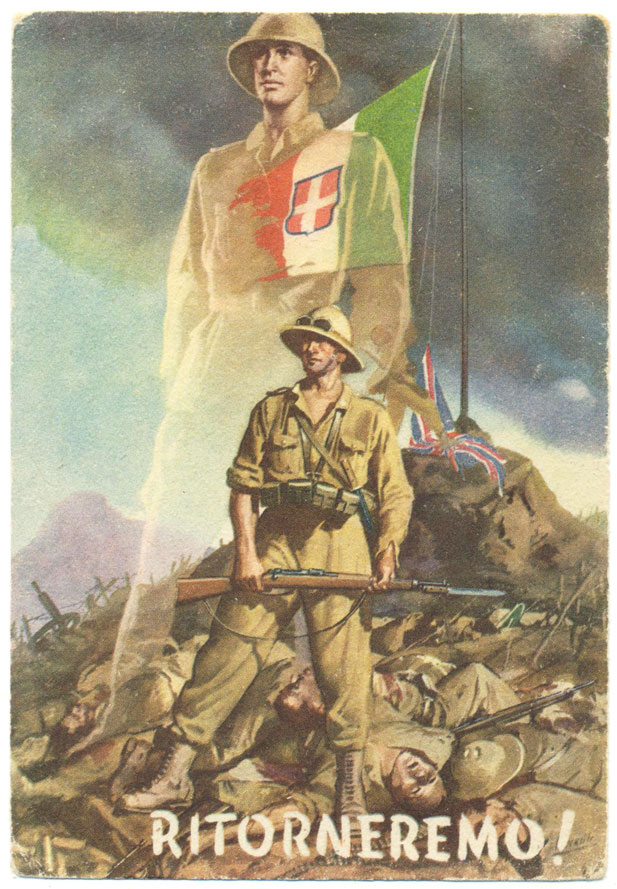
An Italian wartime propaganda poster promising a "return" to Italian East Africa which fell to British and colonial forces in a campaign in January–November 1941

Fascism emphasised the need for the restoration of the Mazzinian Risorgimento tradition that pursued the unification of Italy, that the Fascists claimed had been left incomplete and abandoned in the Giolittian-era Italy. Fascism sought the incorporation of claimed "unredeemed" territories to Italy.

To the east of Italy, the Fascists claimed that Dalmatia was a land of Italian culture whose Italians, including those of Italianized South Slavic descent, had been driven out of Dalmatia and into exile in Italy and supported the return of Italians of Dalmatian heritage. Mussolini identified Dalmatia as having strong Italian cultural roots for centuries via the Roman Empire and the Republic of Venice. The Fascists especially focused their claims based on the Venetian cultural heritage of Dalmatia, claiming that Venetian rule had been beneficial for all Dalmatians and had been accepted by the Dalmatian population. The Fascists were outraged after World War I, when the agreement between Italy and the Entente Allies in the Treaty of London of 1915 to have Dalmatia join Italy was revoked in 1919.

The Fascist regime supported annexation of Yugoslavia's region of Slovenia into Italy that already held a portion of the Slovene population, whereby Slovenia would become an Italian province, resulting in a quarter of Slovene ethnic territory and approximately 327,000 out of total population of 1.3 million Slovenes being subjected to forced Italianization.

The Fascist regime supported annexation of Albania, claimed that Albanians were ethnically linked to Italians through links with the prehistoric Italiotes, Illyrian and Roman populations and that the major influence exerted by the Roman and Venetian empires over Albania justified Italy's right to possess it. The Fascist regime also justified the annexation of Albania on the basis that — because several hundred thousand people of Albanian descent had been absorbed into society in Southern Italy already — the incorporation of Albania was a reasonable measure that would unite people of Albanian descent into one state. The Fascist regime endorsed Albanian irredentism, directed against the predominantly Albanian-populated Kosovo and Epirus – particularly in Chameria inhabited by a substantial number of Albanians. After Italy annexed Albania in 1939, the Fascist regime endorsed assimilating Albanians into Italians and colonising Albania with Italian settlers from the Italian Peninsula to gradually transform it into an Italian land. The Fascist regime claimed the Ionian Islands as Italian territory on the basis that the islands had belonged to the Venetian Republic from the mid-14th until the 18th century.

To the west of Italy, the Fascists claimed that the territories of Corsica, Nice and Savoy held by France were Italian lands. During the period of Italian unification in 1860 to 1861, Prime Minister of Piedmont-Sardinia, Camillo Benso, Count of Cavour, who was leading the unification effort, faced opposition from French Emperor Napoleon III who indicated that France would oppose Italian unification unless France was given Nice and Savoy that were held by Piedmont Sardinia, as France did not want a powerful state having control of all the passages of the Alps. As a result, Piedmont-Sardinia was pressured to concede Nice and Savoy to France in exchange for France accepting the unification of Italy. The Fascist regime produced literature on Corsica that presented evidence of the italianità of the island. The Fascist regime produced literature on Nice that justified that Nice was an Italian land based on historic, ethnic and linguistic grounds. The Fascists quoted Medieval Italian scholar Petrarch who said: "The border of Italy is the Var; consequently Nice is a part of Italy". The Fascists quoted Italian national hero Giuseppe Garibaldi who said: "Corsica and Nice must not belong to France; there will come the day when an Italy mindful of its true worth will reclaim its provinces now so shamefully languishing under foreign domination". Mussolini initially pursued promoting annexation of Corsica through political and diplomatic means, believing that Corsica could be annexed to Italy through first encouraging the existing autonomist tendencies in Corsica and then independence of Corsica from France, that would be followed by annexation of Corsica into Italy.

To the north of Italy, the Fascist regime in the 1930s had designs on the largely Italian-populated region of Ticino and the Romansch-populated region of Graubünden in Switzerland (the Romansch are a people with a Latin-based language). In November 1938, Mussolini declared to the Grand Fascist Council: "We shall bring our border to the Gotthard Pass". The Fascist regime accused the Swiss government of oppressing the Romansch people in Graubünden. Mussolini argued that Romansch was an Italian dialect and thus Graubünden should be incorporated into Italy. Ticino was also claimed because the region had belonged to the Duchy of Milan from the mid-fourteenth century until 1515. Claim was also raised on the basis that areas now part of Graubünden in the Mesolcina valley and Hinterrhein were held by the Milanese Trivulzio family, who ruled from the Mesocco Castle in the late 15th century. Also during the summer of 1940, Galeazzo Ciano met with Adolf Hitler and Joachim von Ribbentrop and proposed to them the dissection of Switzerland along the central chain of the Western Alps, which would have left Italy also with the canton of Valais in addition to the claims raised earlier.

To the south, the regime claimed the archipelago of Malta, which had been held by the British since 1800. Mussolini claimed that the Maltese language was a dialect of Italian, and theories about Malta being the cradle of the Latin civilisation were promoted. Italian had been widely used in Malta in the literary, scientific and legal fields and it was one of Malta's official languages until 1937, when its status was abolished by the British as a response to Italy's invasion of Ethiopia.

Italian irredentists had claimed that territories on the coast of North Africa were Italy's Fourth Shore and used the historical Roman rule in North Africa as a precedent to justify the incorporation of such territories to Italian jurisdiction as being a "return" of Italy to North Africa. In January 1939, Italy annexed territories in Libya that it considered within Italy's Fourth Shore, with Libya's four coastal provinces of Tripoli, Misurata, Benghazi and Derna becoming an integral part of metropolitan Italy. At the same time, indigenous Libyans were given the ability to apply for "Special Italian Citizenship" which required such people to be literate in the Italian language and confined this type of citizenship to be valid in Libya only.

Tunisia, a French protectorate since 1881, had the highest concentration of Italians in North Africa and its seizure by France had been viewed as an injury to national honour in Italy at what they perceived as a "loss" of Tunisia from Italian plans to incorporate it. Upon entering World War II, Italy declared its intention to seize Tunisia as well as the province of Constantine of Algeria from France.

To the south, the Fascist regime held interest in expanding Italy's African colonial possessions. In the 1920s, Italy regarded Portugal as a weak country that was unbecoming of a colonial power due to its weak hold on its colonies and mismanagement of them and as such Italy desired to annexe Portugal's colonies. Italy's relations with Portugal were influenced by the rise to power of the authoritarian conservative nationalist regime of António de Oliveira Salazar, which borrowed fascist methods, though Salazar upheld Portugal's traditional alliance with Britain.

=== Totalitarianism ===
In 1925, the PNF declared that Italy's Fascist state was to be totalitarian. The term "totalitarian" had initially been used as a pejorative accusation by Italy's liberal opposition that denounced the Fascist movement for seeking to create a total dictatorship. However, the Fascists responded by accepting that they were totalitarian, but presented totalitarianism from a positive viewpoint. Mussolini described totalitarianism as seeking to forge an authoritarian national state that would be capable of completing Risorgimento of the Italia Irredenta, forge a powerful modern Italy and create a new kind of citizen – politically active Fascist Italians.

The Doctrine of Fascism (1932) described the nature of Italian Fascism's totalitarianism, stating the following:

Fascism is for the only liberty which can be a serious thing, the liberty of the state and of the individual in the state. Therefore for the fascist, everything is in the state, and no human or spiritual thing exists, or has any sort of value, outside the state. In this sense fascism is totalitarian, and the fascist state which is the synthesis and unity of every value, interprets, develops and strengthens the entire life of the people.

— Benito Mussolini, Giovanni Gentile, Doctrine of Fascism (1932)

American journalist H. R. Knickerbocker wrote in 1941: "Mussolini's Fascist state is the least terroristic of the three totalitarian states. The terror is so mild in comparison with the Soviet or Nazi varieties, that it almost fails to qualify as terroristic at all." As example he described an Italian journalist friend who refused to become a Fascist. He was fired from his newspaper and put under 24-hour surveillance, but otherwise not harassed; his employment contract was settled for a lump sum and he was allowed to work for the foreign press. Knickerbocker contrasted his treatment with the inevitable torture and execution under Stalin or Hitler, and stated "you have a fair idea of the comparative mildness of the Italian kind of totalitarianism".

However, since World War II, historians have noted that in Italy's colonies Italian Fascism displayed extreme levels of violence. One-tenth of the population of the Italian colony of Libya died during the Fascist era, including from the use of gassings, concentration camps, starvation and disease; in Ethiopia during and after the Second Italo-Ethiopian War, a quarter of a million Ethiopians died.

=== Corporatist economics ===
Italian Fascism promotes a corporatist economic system. The economy involves employer and employee syndicates being linked together in corporative associations to collectively represent the nation's economic producers and work alongside the state to set national economic policy. It supports criminalisation of strikes by employees and lockouts by employers, as it deems these acts prejudicial to the national community as a whole.

=== Age and gender roles ===
The Italian Fascists' political anthem was called Giovinezza ("The Youth"). Fascism identifies the physical age period of youth as a critical time for the moral development of people that will affect society.

Italian Fascism pursued what it called "moral hygiene" of youth, particularly regarding sexuality. Fascist Italy promoted what it considered normal sexual behaviour in youth while denouncing what it considered abnormal sexual behaviour. It deemed homosexuality as deviant sexual conduct. The Fascist state also criminalised the dispersion of birth control as well as abortion and created laws that taxed bachelors. Fascist Italy regarded the promotion of male sexual excitation before puberty as the cause of criminality amongst male youth. Fascist Italy reflected the belief of most Italians that homosexuality was wrong and even went as far as to create punitive laws against homosexuals. Instead of the traditional Catholic teaching that it was a sin, a new approach was taken based on then-modern psychoanalysis that it was a social disease. Fascist Italy pursued an aggressive campaign to reduce prostitution of young women.

Mussolini perceived women's primary role to be childbearers while men were warriors, once saying that "war is to man what maternity is to the woman". In an effort to increase birthrates, the Italian Fascist government gave financial incentives to women who raised large families and initiated policies designed to reduce the number of women employed. Italian Fascism called for women to be honoured as "reproducers of the nation" and the Italian Fascist government held ritual ceremonies to honour women's role within the Italian nation. In 1934, Mussolini declared that employment of women was a "major aspect of the thorny problem of unemployment" and that for women working was "incompatible with childbearing". Mussolini went on to say that the solution to unemployment for men was the "exodus of women from the work force".

=== Tradition ===
Italian Fascism believed that the success of Italian nationalism required a clear sense of a shared past amongst the Italian people, along with a commitment to a modernised Italy. In a famous speech in 1926, Mussolini called for Fascist art that was "traditionalist and at the same time modern, that looks to the past and at the same time to the future".

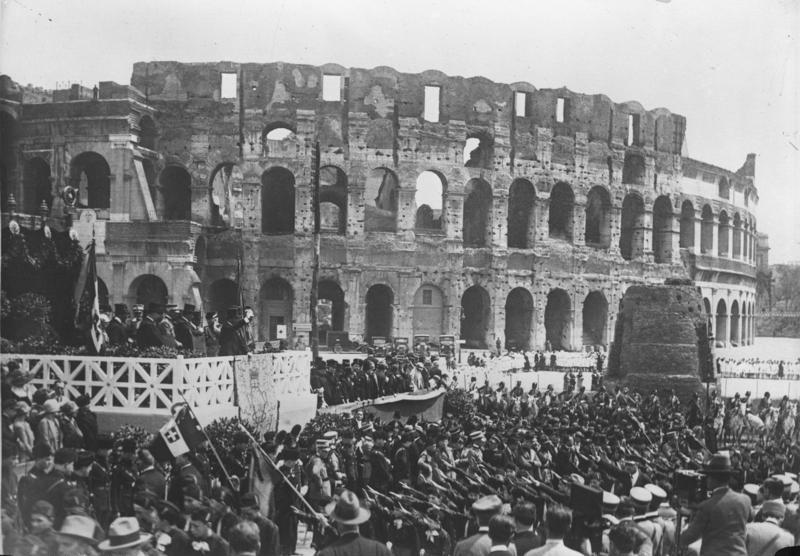
Fascist rally near the Colosseum in Rome

Traditional symbols of Roman civilisation were used by the Fascists, particularly the fasces that symbolised unity, authority and the exercise of power. Other traditional symbols of ancient Rome used by the Fascists included the she-wolf of Rome. The fasces and the she-wolf symbolised the shared Roman heritage of all the regions that constituted the Italian nation. In 1926, the fasces was adopted by the Fascist government of Italy as a symbol of the state. In that year, the Fascist government attempted to have the Italian national flag redesigned to incorporate the fasces. This was stopped by the strong opposition of Italian monarchists. Afterwards, the Fascist government in public ceremonies raised the national tricolour flag along with a Fascist black flag. Years later, after Mussolini was deposed by the King and rescued by German forces in 1943, the Italian Social Republic founded by Mussolini and the Fascists did incorporate the fasces on the state's war flag, which was a variant of the Italian tricolour national flag.

The issue of the rule of monarchy or republic in Italy was an issue that changed several times through the development of Italian Fascism. Initially Italian Fascism was republican and denounced the Savoy monarchy. However, Mussolini tactically abandoned republicanism in 1922 and recognised that the acceptance of the monarchy was a necessary compromise to gain the support of the establishment to challenge the liberal constitutional order that also supported the monarchy. King Victor Emmanuel III had become a popular ruler in the aftermath of Italy's gains after World War I and the army held close loyalty to the King. Thus any idea of overthrowing the monarchy was discarded as foolhardy by the Fascists at this point. Importantly, Fascism's recognition of monarchy provided Fascism with a sense of historical continuity and legitimacy. The Fascists publicly identified King Victor Emmanuel II – the first King of a reunited Italy, who had initiated the Risorgimento – along with other historic Italian figures, such as Gaius Marius, Julius Cæsar, Giuseppe Mazzini, Camillo Benso, Count of Cavour, Giuseppe Garibaldi, and others, for being within a tradition of dictatorship in Italy that the Fascists declared that they emulated. However, this compromise with the monarchy did not yield a cordial relationship between the King and Mussolini. Although Mussolini formally accepted the monarchy, he pursued and largely achieved reduction of the power of the King to that of a figurehead. The King initially held complete nominal legal authority over the military through the Statuto Albertino. That ended during the Fascist regime when Mussolini created the position of First Marshal of the Empire in 1938. This was a two-person position of control over the military held by both the King and the head of government. It had the effect of eliminating the King's previously exclusive legal authority over the military by giving Mussolini equal legal authority. In the 1930s, Mussolini became aggravated by the monarchy's continued existence due to envy of the fact that his counterpart in Germany Adolf Hitler was both head of state and head of government of a republic; and Mussolini in private denounced the monarchy and indicated that he had plans to dismantle the monarchy and create a republic with himself as head of state of Italy upon an Italian success in the then-anticipated major war about to erupt in Europe.

After Mussolini was deposed by the King in 1943 and Italy switched sides from the Axis to the Allies, Italian Fascism returned to republicanism and condemnation of the monarchy. On 18 September 1943, Mussolini made his first public address to the Italian people since his rescue from arrest by German forces. He commended the loyalty of Hitler as an ally while condemning Victor Emmanuel III for betraying Italian Fascism. On the topic of the monarchy removing him from power and dismantling the Fascist regime, Mussolini stated that "[i]t is not the regime that has betrayed the monarchy, it is the monarchy that has betrayed the regime" and that "[w]hen a monarchy fails in its duties, it loses every reason for being...The state we want to establish will be national and social in the highest sense of the word; that is, it will be Fascist, thus returning to our origins." The Fascists at this point did not denounce the House of Savoy in the entirety of its history. They credited Victor Emmanuel II for his rejection of "scornfully dishonourable pacts" and denounced Victor Emmanuel III for betraying Victor Emmanuel II by entering a dishonourable pact with the Allies.

The relationship between Italian Fascism and the Catholic Church was mixed, as originally it was highly anti-clerical and hostile to Catholicism. From the middle to late 1920s, anti-clericalism lost ground in the movement as Mussolini in power sought accord with the Church. In 1929, the Italian government signed the Lateran Treaty with the Holy See, a concordat between Italy and the Catholic Church that created the Vatican City enclave, a sovereign state governed by the papacy. This ended years of tension between the Church and the Italian government after Italy annexed the Papal States in 1870. Italian Fascism justified its adoption of antisemitic laws in 1938 by claiming that Italy was fulfilling the Christian religious mandate of the Catholic Church that had been initiated by Pope Innocent III in the Fourth Lateran Council of 1215. At that time, the Pope issued oppressive laws for Jews in Christian lands, including requiring distinctive clothing.

== Influence outside Italy ==
The National Fascist Party model was very influential beyond Italy. In the twenty-one-year interbellum period, many political scientists and philosophers sought ideological inspiration from Italy. Mussolini's establishment of law and order to Italy and its society was praised by Winston Churchill, Sigmund Freud, George Bernard Shaw and Thomas Edison, as the Fascist Government combated organised crime and the Mafia with violence and vendetta (honour).

Italian Fascism influenced Adolf Hitler's Nazi Party, the Imperial Rule Assistance Association, the FET y de las JONS, the Ustashe, the Russian Fascist Organization, Brit HaBirionim, the British Union of Fascists, the Romanian National Fascist Movement (the National Romanian Fascia and National Italo-Romanian Cultural and Economic Movement). The Sammarinese Fascist Party established a government in San Marino with a politico-philosophic basis that was essentially Italian Fascism. In the Kingdom of Yugoslavia, Milan Stojadinović established his Yugoslav Radical Union, which was based on Fascism. Party members wore green shirts, Šajkača caps and used the Roman salute. Stojadinović also took to calling himself Vodja. In Switzerland, pro-Nazi Colonel Arthur Fonjallaz of the National Front became an ardent Mussolini admirer after visiting Italy in 1932 and advocated the Italian annexation of Switzerland, whilst receiving Fascist foreign aid. The country was host for two Italian politico-cultural activities: the International Centre for Fascist Studies (CINEF — Centre International d' Études Fascistes), and the 1934 congress of the Action Committee for the Universality of Rome (CAUR — Comitato d' Azione della Università de Roma). In Spain, the writer Ernesto Giménez Caballero, in Genio de España (The Genius of Spain, 1932) called for the Italian annexation of Spain, led by Mussolini presiding an international Latin Catholic empire. He then progressed to be closely associated with Falangism, leading to him discarding the idea of Spanish annexation to Italy. In India, Italian Fascism and particularly the Opera Nazionale Balilla, influenced B.S. Moonje and the Hindu Mahasabha. In Brazil, Italian Fascism played a role in inspiring and financing Plínio Salgado's Brazilian Integralist Action.

== Legacy ==
Although the National Fascist Party was outlawed by the postwar Constitution of Italy, a number of successor neo-fascist parties emerged to carry on its legacy. Historically, the largest neo-fascist party was the Italian Social Movement (Movimento Sociale Italiano), whose best result was 8.7% of votes gained in the 1972 general election. The MSI was disbanded in 1995 and was replaced by National Alliance, a conservative party that distanced itself from Fascism (its founder, former foreign minister Gianfranco Fini, declared during an official visit to State of Israel that Fascism was "an absolute evil"). National Alliance and a number of neo-fascist parties were merged in 2009 to create the short-lived People of Freedom party led by then Prime Minister Silvio Berlusconi, which eventually disbanded after the defeat in the 2013 general election. By now, many former members of MSI and AN joined Brothers of Italy, like Giorgia Meloni, Ignazio La Russa, Adolfo Urso, Francesco Lollobrigida, Daniela Santanchè, Luca Ciriani, Alessandro Ciriani, Tommaso Foti, Nello Musumeci, Gianni Alemanno, Giovanni Donzelli, Nicola Procaccini, Andrea Delmastro Delle Vedove, Marcello Gemmato, Paola Frassinetti, Galeazzo Bignami, Claudio Barbaro, Isabella Rauti, Wanda Ferro, Edmondo Cirielli, Giovanbattista Fazzolari, Alessio Butti, Francesco Acquaroli, Marco Marsilio, Federico Mollicone, Romano Maria La Russa, Marcello Taglialatela, Michele Rallo, Salvo Sallemi, Carlo Ciccioli, Gennaro Sangiuliano, Marco Scurria, Carlo Fidanza, and Elena Donazzan.

== Secretaries of the PNF ==
- Michele Bianchi (November 1921 – January 1923)
- multiple presidency (January 1923 – October 1923)

Triumvirate: Michele Bianchi, Nicola Sansanelli, Giuseppe Bastianini

- Francesco Giunta (15 October 1923 – 22 April 1924)
- multiple presidency (23 April 1924 – 15 February 1925)

Quadrumvirate: Roberto Forges Davanzati, Cesare Rossi, Giovanni Marinelli, Alessandro Melchiorri

- Roberto Farinacci (15 February 1925 – 30 March 1926)
- Augusto Turati (30 March 1926 – 7 October 1930)
- Giovanni Giuriati (October 1930 – December 1931)
- Achille Starace (December 1931 – 31 October 1939)
- Ettore Muti (31 October 1939 – 30 October 1940)
- Adelchi Serena (30 October 1940 – 26 December 1941)
- Aldo Vidussoni (26 December 1941 – 19 April 1943)
- Carlo Scorza (19 April 1943 – 27 July 1943)

== Election results ==
=== Italian Parliament ===
Election	Leader	Chamber of Deputies				
Election	Leader	Votes	%	Seats	+/–	Position
1924	Benito Mussolini	4,653,488	64.9	375 / 535	▲375	▲1st
1929	Benito Mussolini	8,517,838	98.4	400 / 400	▲25	1st
1934	Benito Mussolini	10,043,875	99.8	400 / 400	0	1st

== Party symbols ==
Party emblem of the National Fascist Party

Eagle clutching a fasces, a common symbol of Italian Fascism, regularly used on uniforms and caps

Flag of the National Fascist Party

== Slogans ==
- Viva il Duce! ("Long live the Leader!")
- Saluto al Duce! ("Hail the Leader!")
- Me ne frego ("I don't care")
- Tutto nello Stato, niente al di fuori dello Stato, nulla contro lo Stato ("Everything in the State, nothing outside the State, nothing against the State") – Benito Mussolini (October 1925)
- La guerra è per l'uomo, come la maternità è per la donna ("War is to man, as motherhood is to woman")
- Viva la morte ("Long live death [sacrifice]")
- Credere, obbedire, combattere ("Believe, obey, fight")
- Vincere e vinceremo! ("Win and we will win!")
- Libro e moschetto - fascista perfetto ("Book and rifle - perfect Fascist")
- Se avanzo, seguitemi. Se indietreggio, uccidetemi. Se muoio, vendicatemi ("If I advance, follow me. If I retreat, kill me. If I die, avenge me")
- La libertà non è un diritto, è un dovere ("Liberty is not a right it is a duty")
- Noi tireremo diritto (literally "We will go straight" or "We shall go forward")

== See also ==
- Glossary of Fascist Italy
- Fascism
- Fascism and ideology
- Italian fascism
- Revolutionary nationalism
- Squadrismo
- Ranks and insignia of the National Fascist Party
- Italian fascism and racism

== Bibliography ==
- Renzo De Felice, Le interpretazioni del fascismo, Laterza, Roma-Bari, 1977
- Renzo De Felice, I rapporti tra fascismo e nazionalsocialismo fino all'andata al potere di Hitler. 1922-1933. Appunti e documenti. Anno accademico 1970-1971, Napoli, Edizioni Scientifiche Italiane, 1971
- Renzo De Felice, Autobiografia del fascismo. Antologia di testi fascisti, 1919-1945, Minerva italica, Bergamo, 1978
- Renzo De Felice, Intellettuali di fronte al fascismo. Saggi e note documentarie, Bonacci, Roma, 1985
- Renzo De Felice, Fascismo, Prefazione di Sergio Romano, Introduzione di Francesco Perfetti, Luni Editrice, Milano-Trento, 1998. ISBN 88-7984-109-2
- Renzo De Felice, Breve storia del Fascismo, Mondadori, Milano, 2002
- Carlo Galeotti, Achille Starace e il vademecum dello stile fascista, Rubbettino, 2000 ISBN 88-7284-904-7
- Carlo Galeotti, Benito Mussolini ama molto i bambini..., Galeotti editore, 2022
- Carlo Galeotti, Saluto al Duce!, Gremese, 2001
- Carlo Galeotti, Credere obbedire combattere, Stampa alternativa, 1996
- Paola S. Salvatori, La seconda Mostra della Rivoluzione fascista, in "Clio", XXXIX, 3, 2003, pp. 439–459
- Paola S. Salvatori, La Roma di Mussolini dal socialismo al fascismo. (1901-1922), in «Studi Storici», XLVII, 2006, 3, pp. 749–780
- Paola S. Salvatori, L'adozione del fascio littorio nella monetazione dell'Italia fascista, in "Rivista italiana di numismatica e scienze affini", CIX, 2008, pp. 333–352
- Paola S. Salvatori, Liturgie immaginate: Giacomo Boni e la romanità fascista, in "Studi Storici", LIII, 2012, 2, pp. 421–438
