= Arab Lictor Youth =

Youth organization in Libya

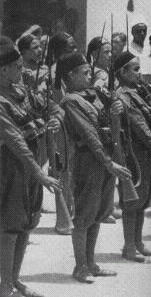
GAL members in uniform

Arab Lictor Youth (Arabic: شباب الليتوريو العرب Shabāb Al-Līttūriw Al-ʿArab, Italian: Gioventù Araba del Littorio, abbreviated G.A.L.) was a fascist youth organization for Arab youth in Italian Libya.

== History ==
GAL was founded by the Italian Governor-General in Libya, Italo Balbo, in October 1935. GAL functioned as the Libyan counterpart of the Italian Lictor Youth (GIL). GAL was divided into Aftal (organizing children up to twelve years of age, similar to the Opera Nazionale Balilla movement in Italy) and Sciubban (organizing youngsters between thirteen and eighteen years of age). GAL was mainly based in the larger cities along the Mediterranean coast. GAL contingents marched at virtually all parades and festivals held in Libya at the time.

The organization provided pre-military and cultural education to Libyan Arab youth. These training programmes became an important part of the educational system during fascist rule in Libya, preparing young Libyans for military service in the Italian armed forces. GAL also had sports activities; it was one of two sports organization in Libya at the time which was open to Muslims. The sporting activities of the organization were led by Ramadan Alì.

The GAL team of football was admitted to play in the last "Campionato tripolino di calcio" (the last "Tripoli championship") in 1940, before WW2 blocked all sport activities in Libya.

As per ideological indoctrination, there is little evidence to suggest that the organization was particularly successful in instilling fascist ideological doctrine amongst the Libyan youth.

Having had at least one year of membership in GAL was one of the conditions for Libyan Muslims seeking "Cittadinanza Italiana Speciale" (Italian Special citizenship, created for indigenous Libyans only within Italian Libya; they could not migrate to Italy proper). There was also a corresponding movements for adults, the Muslim Association of the Lictor (a referent of the National Fascist Party).

== Bibliography ==
- Del Boca, Angelo. Gli italiani in Libia. Vol. 1: Tripoli bel suol d'Amore. Milano, Mondadori, 1997.
- Smeaton Munro, Ion. Through Fascism to World Power: A History of the Revolution in Italy. Ayer Publishing. Manchester (New Hampshire), 1971. ISBN 0-8369-5912-4

== See also ==
- Albanian Lictor Youth
- Italian Libya
