= Spazio vitale =

Italian fascist expansionist political project

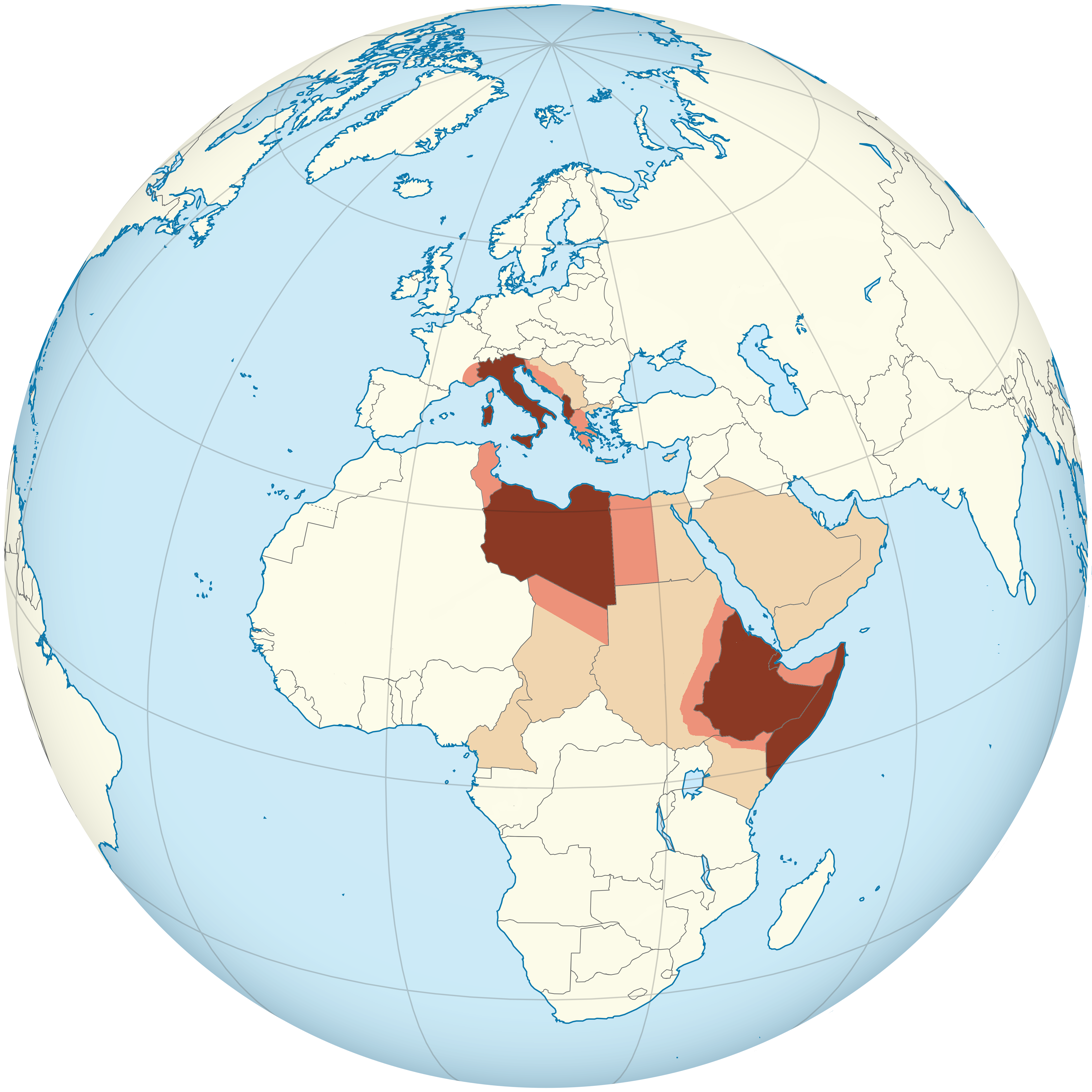
The Italian Empire to be realized within the policy of spazio vitale. Dark red indicates the Italian mainland and actual Italian protectorates and colonies, light red indicates the territories that were occupied by Italian troops during World War II, and beige indicates the territories of the projected Imperial Italy.

Spazio vitale (Italian: [ˈspattsjo viˈtaːle]; 'living space') was the territorial expansionist concept of Italian fascism. It was defined in universal terms as "that part of the globe over which extends either the vital requirements or expansionary impetus of a state with strong unitary organization which seeks to satisfy its needs by expanding beyond its national boundaries". Spazio vitale was analogous to Nazi Germany's concept of Lebensraum.

The territorial extent of the Italian spazio vitale was to cover the Mediterranean as a whole (Mare Nostrum) and Northern Africa from the Atlantic Ocean to the Indian Ocean. It was to be divided into piccolo spazio ('small space'), which was to be inhabited only by Italians, and grande spazio ('large space') inhabited by other nations to be under the Italian sphere of influence. The nations in the grande spazio would be subjected to Italian rule and protection, but were to keep their own languages and cultures. Fascist ideologist Giuseppe Bottai likened this historic mission to the deeds of the ancient Romans, stating that the new Italians will "illuminate the world with their art, educate it with their knowledge, and give robust structure to their new territories with their administrative technique and ability".

== Ideological characteristics ==
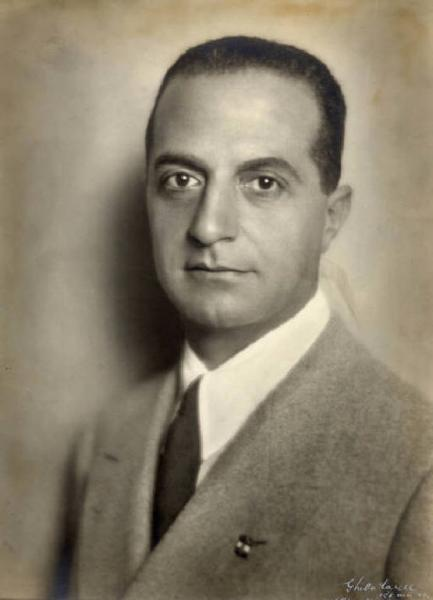
According to the Italian Fascist ideologist (Note: Giuseppe Bottai voted for Mussolini's arrest in 1943; the Italian Social Republic condemned Bottai to death, during the Verona trial. He was able to escape and, in 1944, enlisted in the French Foreign Legion to fight alongside the Allies against Nazi Germany.) Giuseppe Bottai (pictured), spazio vitale justified Italian colonialism in Europe and Africa.

In the political philosophy of Italian fascism, the concept of spazio vitale, which justified the colonial expansion of Italy, corresponded to the Lebensraum concept of the Nazis in Germany.

As such, the ideological purpose of spazio vitale included the exportation of revolutionary fascism to replace the native political systems in order to civilise the conquered peoples into colonies of fascist Italy.

The fascist ideologist Giuseppe Bottai said that the historic mission of spazio vitale was like that of Ancient Rome (753 BC – AD 476), and that the New Rome—the Italian Empire—would "illuminate the world with their art, educate it with their knowledge, and give robust structure to their new territories with their administrative technique and ability". Once under Italian hegemonic rule, the subjugated peoples would be permitted to retain their native languages and cultures within the Italian Empire.

The fascist regime declared that the achievement of Italy's spazio vitale would be divided into three stages: short-term, medium-term, and long-term. The schedule for its achievement was accelerated due to the outbreak of World War II.

== In Europe ==
In Europe, Italy's spazio vitale was to include southeastern Europe. Italy's short-term plans involved the expansion of its grande spazio in southeastern Europe that was to include several nations. In 1941, Italy defined these plans. Croatia and Bosnia and Herzegovina were valuable to Italy because of their timber reserves, cattle herds, and their rich deposits of carbon, lignite, iron, copper, chrome, manganese, pyrites, antimony, and mercury. Serbia, upon being territorially "reduced to its effective proportions", would be within the spazio vitale of its mineral wealth, and in particular its copper deposits in Bor. Bulgaria was to be incorporated into the spazio vitale in the Mediterranean once it had acquired its "rightful" outlet to the Aegean Sea, and would be a major trading partner with Italy due to its rapeseed and soya production, wine production, and chrome deposits. Greece was to be included, whereupon Italy would assist in developing Greece's natural resources and develop a steel industry that had not been achieved; Greece would benefit from trade with Italy, and Italy in turn would gain access to these resources.

Hungary was of interest to be included because of its river harbours, tourism, large-scale production of agricultural machinery, electrical goods, pharmaceuticals, and timber. Romania was a target of Italy's ambitions that was included in plans promoted by Mussolini and Italy's Chief of the General Staff Alberto Pariani. In 1939, Pariani stated that Italian-supported military intervention in Romania would result in Romania ceding Transylvania to Hungary and southern Dobrudja to Bulgaria. Pariani in discussion with Hungarian officials repeated Mussolini's arguments that the Italian Army could militarily intervene against Yugoslavia and cross over its territory to seize Romania's oilfields and prevent a Soviet advance into the Balkans.

== In Africa ==
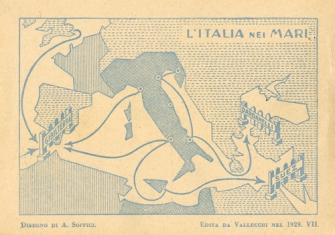
L’Italia nei mari ( ‘Italy in the seas’.)

In Africa, the spazio vitale was to include large territories in North and East Africa. Regarding modern-day Italy as the heir to the Roman Empire, the fascist regime utilized the precedent of historical Roman control of these territories to make land claims in North Africa. North Africa's coastline was regarded as of strategic importance to the fascists' ambition of Mare Nostrum to allow Italy to dominate and control the Mediterranean Sea.

The fascist regime emphasized the strategic importance of political and economic connection of Europe with Africa, and at times referred to the two areas in unison as "Eurafrica". As part of this position, the regime produced maps displaying hypothetical rail lines and hydroelectric grids extending from Africa to Italy through the Italian colony of Libya as proposals to more closely integrate Italy's African possessions with Italy itself.

== See also ==
- Glossary of Fascist Italy
- Greater East Asia Co-Prosperity Sphere
- Italian fascism
- Italian imperialism under fascism
- Lebensraum
- Manifest destiny
- Mare Nostrum
