= Muslim Association of the Lictor =

Muslim Association of the Lictor Associazione Musulmana del Littorio الرابطة الإسلامية للكتور
- Founder: Italo Balbo
- Founded: 9 January 1939
- Dissolved: 1943
- Headquarters: Tripoli, Italian Libya
- Youth wing: Arab Lictor Youth
- Ideology: Italian fascism
- National affiliation: National Fascist Party

The Muslim Association of the Lictor (Italian: Associazione Musulmana del Littorio, AML; Arabic: الرابطة الإسلامية للكتور) was created in January 1939 as the Muslim branch of the National Fascist Party of Italy. It was found mainly and largely in Italian Libya. It was dissolved by the Allies during the invasion of Italy in 1943.

== History ==
The "Associazione mussulmana del Littorio" was founded by the Italian Governor-General in Libya, Italo Balbo, on January 9, 1939.

This "Cittadinanza Italiana Speciale" (Italian Special citizenship) was created for indigenous Libyans only within Libya (they could not migrate to Italy proper with this form of citizenship) that was claimed to have been done as a gesture of gratitude for the military support received by 9000 native Libyans in the Italian conquest of Ethiopia in 1936. Laws were subsequently passed that permitted indigenous Libyans to join the National Fascist Party and in particular the Muslim Association of the Lictor.

The correspondent association of AML for youths in Italian Libya was called Arab Lictor Youth.

== Bibliography ==
- Donati, Sabina A Political History of National Citizenship and Identity in Italy, 1861–1950. Stanford University Press, Stanford, 2013 ISBN 0804787336 ()
