= Opera Nazionale Balilla =

Italian Fascist youth organization

- Formation: 1926
- Dissolved: 1937
- Type: Paramilitary youth organization
- Legal status: Defunct, illegal
- Region served: Fascist Italy
- Parent organization: National Fascist Party

Opera Nazionale Balilla (ONB) was an Italian Fascist paramilitary youth organization functioning between 1926 and 1937, when it was absorbed into the Gioventù Italiana del Littorio (GIL), a youth section of the National Fascist Party.

It takes its name from Balilla, the nickname of Giovan Battista Perasso, a Genoese boy who, according to local legend, started the revolt of 1746 against the Habsburg forces that occupied the city in the War of the Austrian Succession. Perasso was chosen as the inspiration for his supposed age and revolutionary activity, while his presence in the fight against Austria reflected the irredentist stance taken by early Fascism, and Italy's victories in World War I.

The Balilla creed echoed the Nicene Creed: "I believe in Rome the eternal, the mother of my country, and in Italy, her eldest daughter, who was born in her virginal bosom by the grace of God; who suffered through the barbarian invasions, was crucified and buried, who descended to the grave, and was raised from the dead in the nineteenth century, who ascended into heaven in her glory in 1918 and 1922 and who is seated on the right hand of her mother Rome; who for this reason shall come to judge the living and the dead. I believe in the genius of Mussolini, in our Holy Father Fascism, in the communion of the martyrs, in the conversion of Italians and in the resurrection of the Empire."

== Origins ==
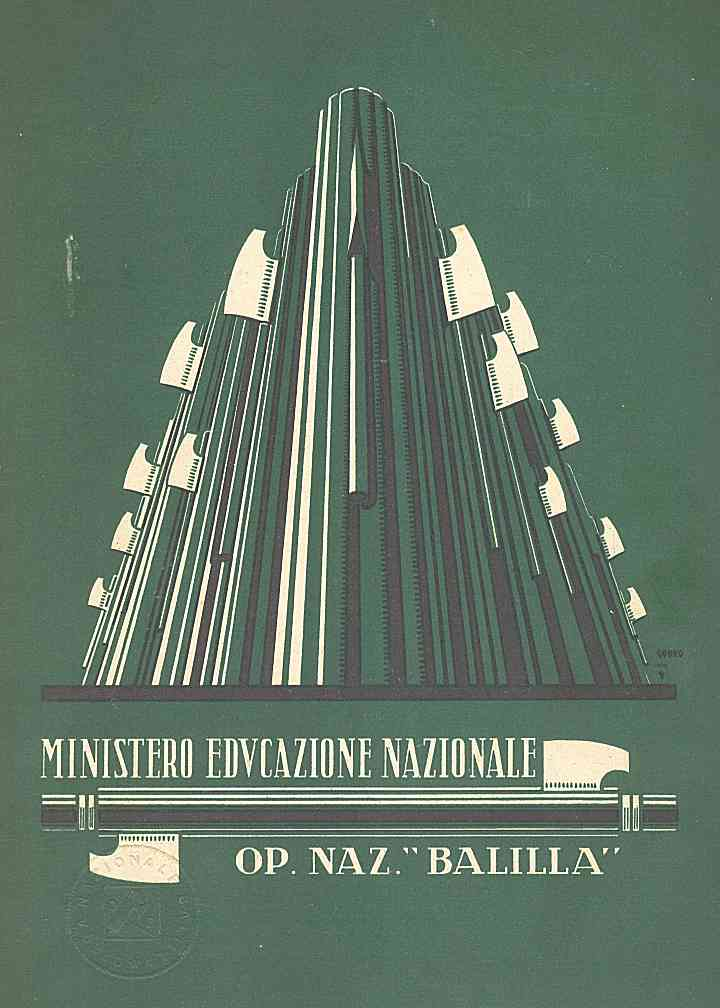
A 1932 Balilla report card.

Nationalists in the years after the war thought of themselves as combating both liberal and domineering institutions created by cabinets such as those of Giovanni Giolitti, including traditional schooling. Futurism, a revolutionary cultural movement which served as a catalyst for Fascism, argued for "a school for physical courage and patriotism", as expressed by Filippo Tommaso Marinetti in 1919. Marinetti expressed his disdain for "the by now prehistoric and troglodyte Ancient Greek and Latin courses", arguing for their replacement with exercise modelled on those of the Arditi soldiers ("[learning] to advance on hands and knees in front of razing machine gun fire; to wait open-eyed for a crossbeam to move sideways over their heads etc."). It was in those years that the first Fascist youth wings were formed (Avanguardia Giovanile Fascista in 1919, and Gioventù Universitaria Fascista, GUF, in 1922).

- Balilla (boys) and Piccole Italiane (girls) - ages 8 to 14
- Avanguardisti and Giovani Italiane - 14 to 18

In time, a section named Figli della Lupa ("Children of the She-Wolf", alluding to the myth of Romulus and Remus; ages 6 to 8) was added. (note: Balilla and Avanguardisti were both substructures of the Opera Nazionale Balilla; the latter was not a separate organization.

Between the ages of 18 and 21, young men and women would join additional groups of the ONB - Fasci Giovanili di Combattimento (see Fasci di Combattimento) and Giovani Fasciste, respectively. Male students in all forms of higher education were enrolled in the GUF.

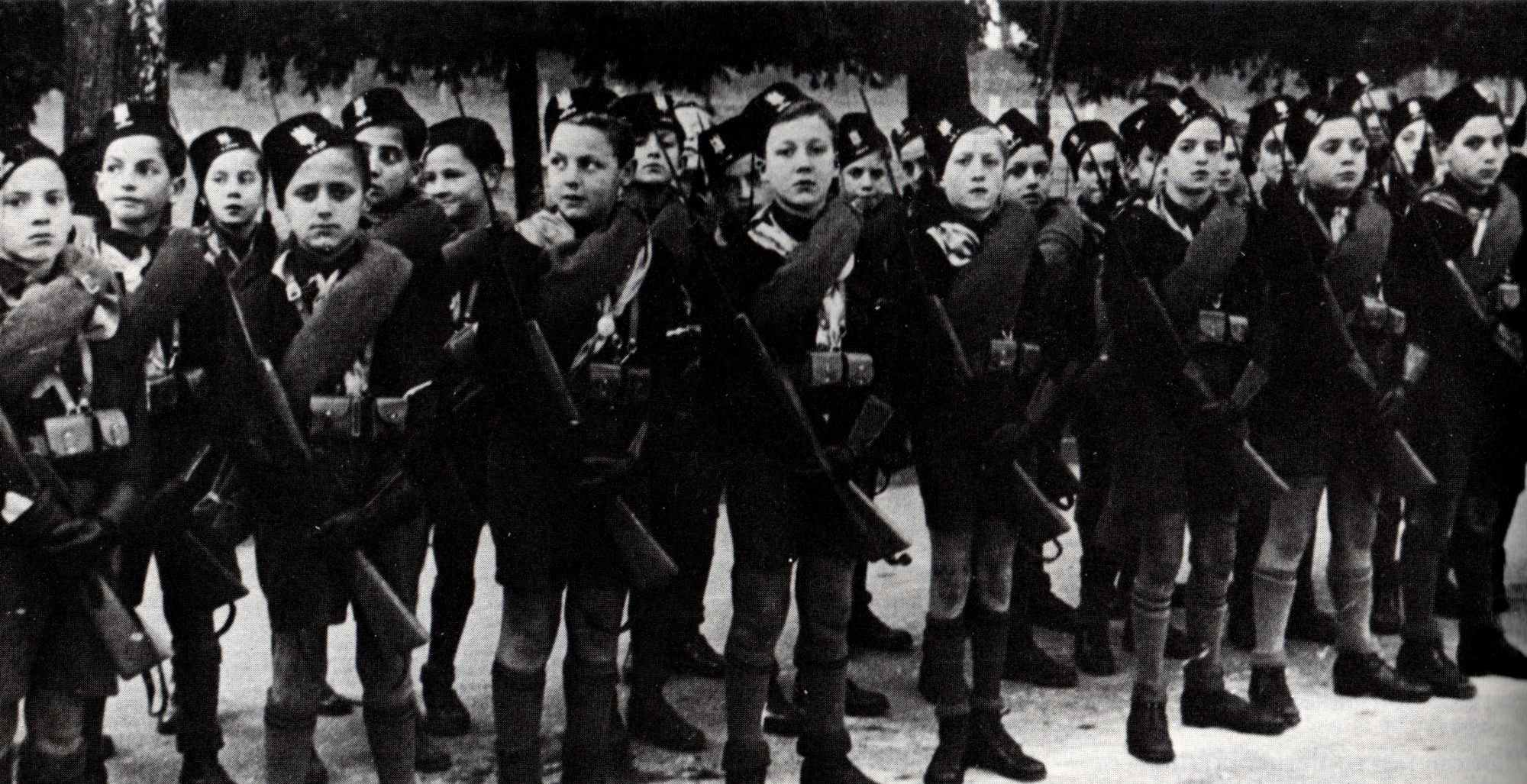
Young members of the Opera Nazionale Balilla wearing military-style uniforms

The Opera Nazionale Balilla was established by law as an institution under the control of the Ministry of National Education in 1926. Initially, membership was voluntary, but it was later made compulsory for boys between the ages of 6 and 18 and girls between the ages of 8 and 14. In 1936, a pre-Balilla kindergarten was established for children under the age of 6. ONB members were required to study military science and Italian history.

While the National Balilla Institution was founded as an Ente Morale, in 1929 it was placed under the power of the Ministry of National Education, with the Head of the Government's related power devolving to the Minister of National Education. In 1935 a veteran National Fascist Party politician Araldo di Crollalanza was named the president of ONB.

== Character ==
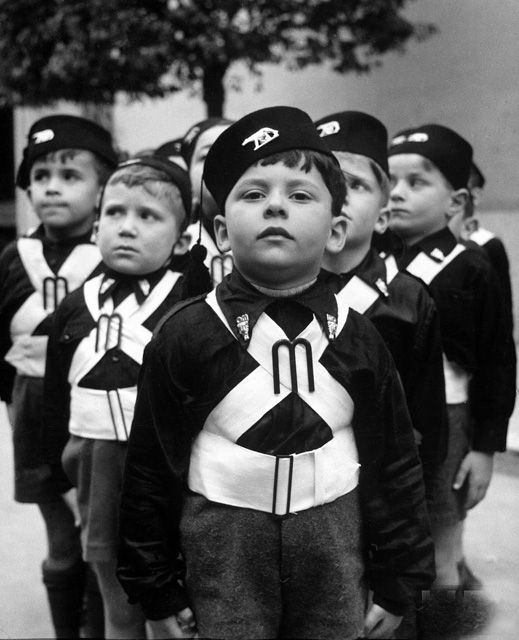
Boys in Balilla uniform, 1936

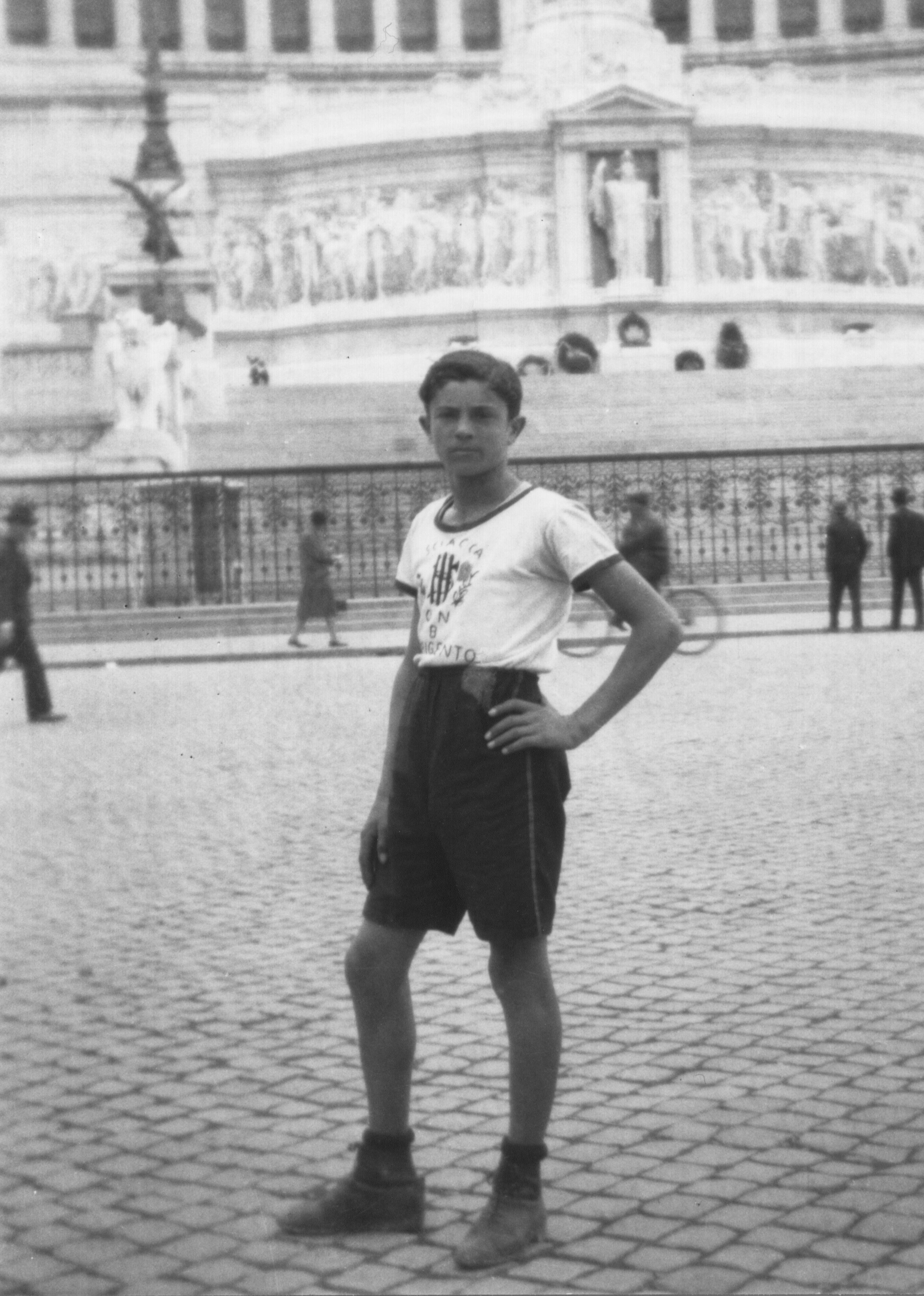
A young balilla in Piazza Venezia.

The organization surpassed its purpose as a cultural institution that was intended to serve as the ideological counterpart of school, and served as a paramilitary group (training for future assignments in the Italian Army), as well as education in the career of choice, technology (including post-school courses for legal adults), or education related to home and family (solely for the girls). It carried out indoctrination with a message of Italian-ness and Fascism, training youths as "the fascists of tomorrow". During the years following its creation, ONB was left without real competition, as the regime banned all other youth movements, including scouting and the Roman Catholic Church group Gioventù Italiana Cattolica (which was forced to limit its activities).

Moreover, the ONB took charge of all activities initiated by schools and pressured teachers to enlist all students. Aside from the usual "Fascist Saturdays", children would spend their summers in camps (which included the national-level Campi Dux, reunions of Balilla and Avanguardisti).

Male children enrolled wore a uniform adapted from that of the Blackshirts: the eponymous black shirt, the fez of Arditi tradition, grey-green trousers, black fasces emblems, and azure bandanas (i.e.: in the national colour of Italy). During military exercises, they were armed with a scaled-down version of Royal Italian Army service rifle, Moschetto Balilla (the rifles were replaced with replica versions for the Figli della Lupa).

Balilla units were also established outside of Italy. In Malta, then a British colony, Maltese nationalists created a unit. Similarly, in Marseille, Balilla was implemented in the Casa d'Italia, the consular house. These were disbanded with the advent of the Second World War.

== Casa del Balilla ==
The local headquarters of the Balilla groups were called Casa del Balilla. Many of them were purpose-built in the Italian rationalist style.

== See also ==
- Hitler Youth
- Great Japan Youth Party
- Ustaše Youth
- Levente Associations
- National Youth Organisation (Greece)
- Young Army Cadets National Movement
- Red Youth Guards
- Fascist Male Academy of Physical Education

== External sources ==
- Italian Fascist Youth Groups

== Bibliography ==
- Carlo Galeotti, Achille Starace e il vademecum dello stile fascista, Rubbettino, 2000 ISBN 88-7284-904-7
- Carlo Galeotti - Benito Mussolini ama molto i bambini..., Galeotti editore, 2022
- Giorgio Vecchiato, Con romana volontà, Marsilio, 2005
- Carlo Galeotti, Saluto al Duce!, Gremese, 2001.
- Carlo Galeotti, Credere obbedire combattere, Stampa alternativa, 1996.
- P. Cavaleri, Eravamo tutti Balilla, Mursia, Milano ISBN 978-88-425-3594-2
- Mariella Colin, I bambini di Mussolini. Letteratura, libri, letture per l'infanzia sotto il fascismo, Editore La Scuola (collana Saggi), 2012 ISBN 978-88-350-3062-1
