= Me ne frego (1936 song) =

Song by Aldo Masseglia

from the album Era Fascista, Vol. 5
- Language: Italian
- Released: 1936
- Genre: War song
- Length: 3:20
- Label: Odeon Records
- Composer: R. Prisco
- Lyricist: E. A. Mario

"Me ne frego" is an Italian song written by composer R. Prisco and poet E. A. Mario in 1936 and released by Odeon Records. In 1997, the song in its original recording was included on the fifth album of the Era Fascista compilation.

== Song meaning ==
The phrase me ne frego literally means "I don't care" in a rude manner. It comes from the idiomatic verb fregarsene, which emotionally describes disdain. Accordingly, the phrase me ne frego can be translated with the same emotional coloring as "I don't care", "I don't give a damn", etc. It comes from the Romanesco dialect. In a military-nationalist sense, the slogan was first mentioned on June 15, 1918 in Giavera del Montello between Captain Pietro Zaninelli of the 27th Battalion of the Arditi and Major Freguglia during the Second Battle of the Piave River during World War I. Freguglia told Zaninelli that he and his company were to attack the Austrians in the building at Giavera del Montello; Freguglia added that it was a suicide mission, but that it had to be carried out at any cost. Zaninelli looked at Freguglia and replied: "Mister commander, I don't care, you are going to do what you have to do for the king and for the fatherland" (Italian: Signor comandante io me ne frego, si fa ciò che si ha da fare per il re e per la patria). Zaninelli died in battle. Later, this slogan, implying contempt for danger and indifference to death, spread among the Arditi, and after the World War I became one of the mottos of the military-nationalist groups loyal to Benito Mussolini during Fascist Italy. Nowadays, it has lost its political connotation and is usually used as a sign of bravery, indifference to danger or fear.

The song, referring to the motto, talks about fearlessness in the face of threat, and the willingness to reject one’s own comfort in the name of the homeland. The second verse claims that Mussolini himself could have uttered it in response to the claims of "Albion" (i.e. Great Britain), and the fourth verse claims that it is spoken directly by Italy to all those who disagree with its ambitions: this is a reference to the Second Italo-Ethiopian War, during which Italy waged a war of aggression against Ethiopia, which led to the foundation of Italian East Africa. The fifth verse claims that even a dark-skinned Askari who has learned Italian is ready to happily repeat the slogan as proof of his Italian patriotism. All the verses lead up to the chorus in such a way that it always looks like a quote:

Me ne frego non so se ben mi spiego,
Me ne frego con quel che piace a me

"I don't care, I don't know if I'm explaining myself well,
I don't care. [I'll do] about what I like."
