= Avanguardia Giovanile Fascista =

Former Italian fascist student organization

Avanguardia Giovanile Fascista (A.G.F.) was a fascist student youth organization established in the 1920s by the National Fascist Party of Benito Mussolini.
