= Gioventù Italiana del Littorio =

Youth movement in Fascist Italy

- Formation: 1937
- Dissolved: 1943
- Type: Youth organization
- Legal status: Defunct, illegal
- Region served: Fascist Italy
- Parent organization: National Fascist Party

The Gioventù Italiana del Littorio (GIL; English: Italian Youth of the Lictor) was the consolidated youth movement of the National Fascist Party of Italy that was established in 1937, to replace the Opera Nazionale Balilla (ONB). It was created to supervise and influence the minds of all youths, that was effectively directed against the influence of the Catholic Church on youths.

== Overview ==
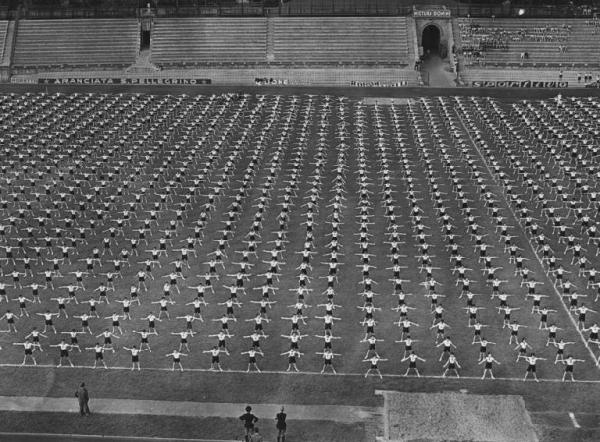
Gioventù Italiana del Littorio, Milan.

The organization surpassed its purpose as a cultural institution that was intended to serve as the ideological counterpart of school, and served as a paramilitary group (training for future assignments in the Italian Army), as well as education in the career of choice, technology (including postschool courses for legal adults), or education related to home and family (solely for the girls). It carried out indoctrination with a message of Italian-ness and Fascism, training youths as "the fascists of tomorrow".

Moreover, the GIL took charge of all activities initiated by schools, and pressured teachers to enlist all students. Aside from the usual "Fascist Saturdays", children would spend their summers in camps (which included the national-level Campi Dux, reunions of Balilla and Avanguardisti).

Male children enrolled wore a uniform adapted from that of the Blackshirts: the eponymous black shirt, the fez of Arditi tradition, grey-green trousers, black fasces emblems, and azure handkerchiefs (i.e.: in the national colour of Italy). During military exercises, they were armed with scaled-down version of Royal Italian Army service rifle, Moschetto Balilla (the rifles were replaced with replica versions for the Figli della Lupa).

When Italy entered World War II, members of the GIL who were above the age of eighteen were called up to fight in the Royal Army of Italy but in 1943, after a string of defeats culminating in the Allied invasions of Sicily and the Italian mainland, boys aged sixteen and over were called up to fight, until the Armistice of Cassibile. However, boys and girls of the GIL found themselves picking sides. Some served in the Italian Co-Belligerent Army, the National Republican Army or the Italian Resistance Movement after German troops marched into Italy and disarmed Italian troops, who refused to continue fighting and established the Italian Social Republic.

== Bibliography ==
- Carlo Galeotti, Achille Starace e il vademecum dello stile fascista, Rubbettino, 2000 ISBN 978-88-7284-904-0
- Carlo Galeotti - Benito Mussolini ama molto i bambini..., Galeotti editore, 2022
- Giorgio Vecchiato, Con romana volontà, Marsilio, 2005. ISBN 978-88-317-8690-4
- Carlo Galeotti, Saluto al Duce!, Gremese, 2001. ISBN 978-88-8440-102-1
- Carlo Galeotti, Credere obbedire combattere, Stampa alternativa, 1996. ISBN 978-88-7226-299-3
