= Women in Italy =

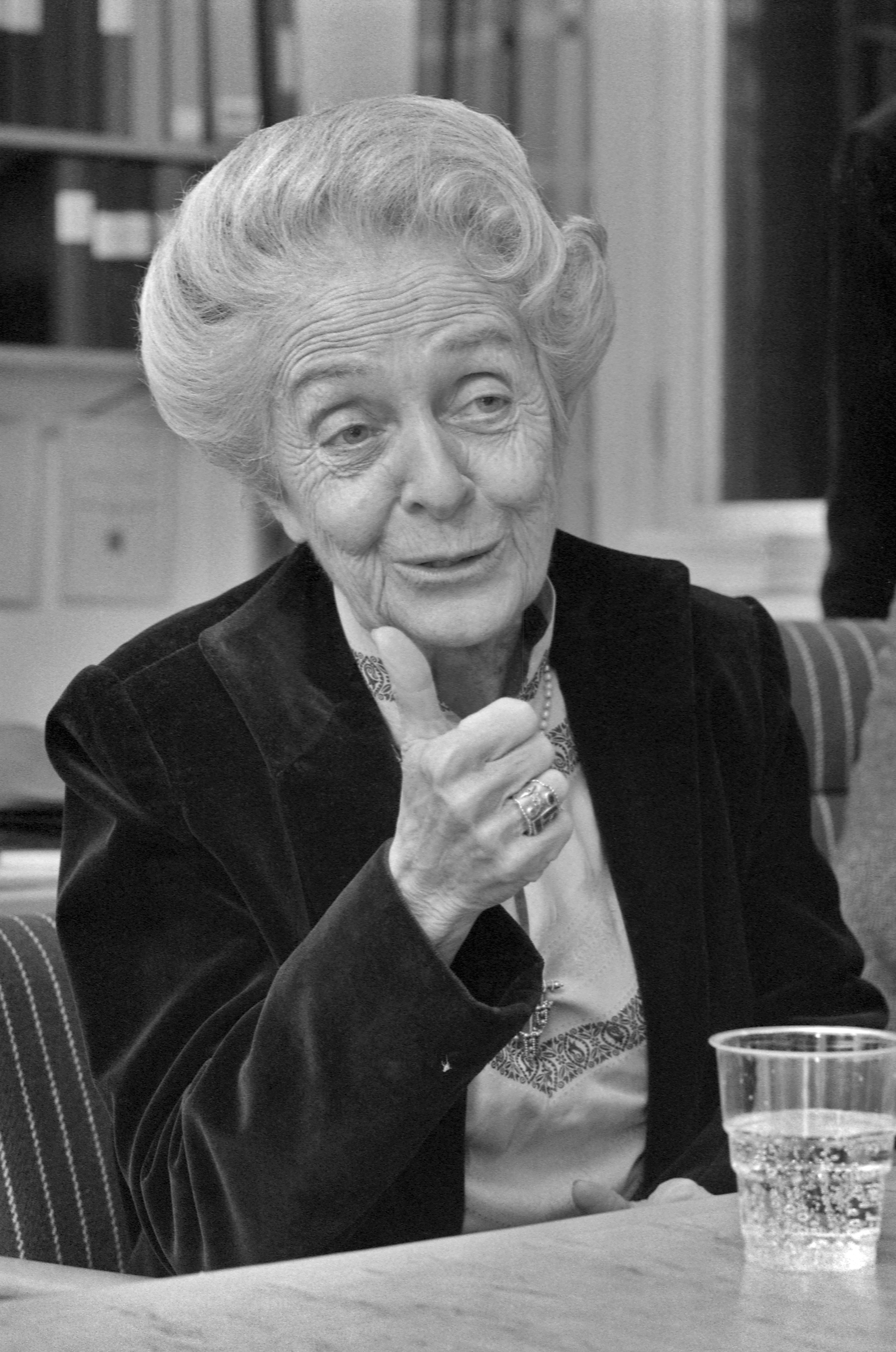
- Rita Levi-Montalcini, 1986 Nobel Prize winner for Medicine

General statistics
- Maternal mortality (per 100,000): 2.7 (2020)
- Women in parliament: 30.1%
- Women over 25 with secondary education: 79.1% (M: 83.3%)
- Women in labour force: 54% (M: 74%)

Gender Inequality Index
- Value: 0.056 (2021)
- Rank: 13th out of 191

Global Gender Gap Index
- Value: 0.704 (2025)
- Rank: 85th out of 148

Women in Italy refers to women who are from (or reside in) Italy. The legal and social status of Italian women has undergone rapid transformation in recent decades. This includes family laws, the enactment of anti-discrimination measures, and reforms to the penal code (particularly regarding crimes of violence against women).

== History ==
=== Women in Etruscan society ===
The Etruscan civilization was an ancient civilization of people inhabiting Etruria (most of modern-day Tuscany, northern Lazio, and northwestern Umbria) in ancient Italy. The Etruscans had a common language and culture; they formed a federation of city-states.

Women were respected in Etruscan society more than their ancient Greek and Roman counterparts. Today only the status of aristocratic women is known because no documentation survives about women in other social classes. Etruscan women were politically important and dominant in family and social life. Their status in Etruscan civilization differed from their Greek and the Roman peers, who were considered to be marginal and secondary in relation to men.

Women's roles and images evolved during the Etruscan period. Affluent women were well-groomed and led family lives within society, where their role mattered politically and administratively. Tanaquil and Velia Spurinna were among the women who played leading roles in Etruscan politics. In the final phase of Etruscan history, women lost much of their independence amidst conquest by the Roman Republic, and their status became that of Roman women.

=== Women in ancient Rome ===
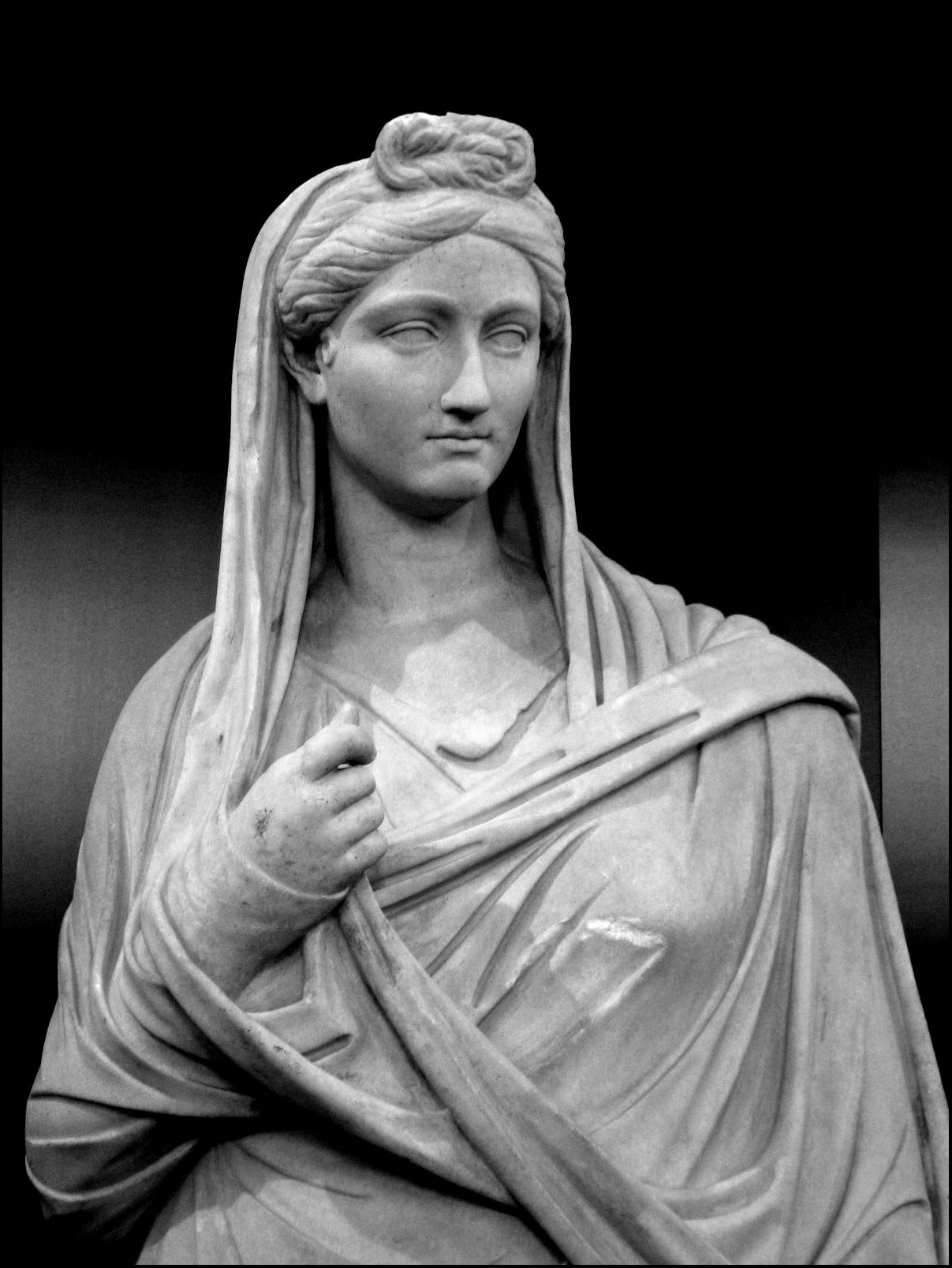
The educated and well-traveled Vibia Sabina (ca. 136 AD) was a grand-niece of the Roman emperor Trajan and became the wife of his successor Hadrian; unlike some empresses, she played little role in court politics and remained independent in private life, having no children and seeking emotional gratification in love affairs

Freeborn women in ancient Rome were citizens (cives), but could not vote or hold political office. Because of their limited public role, women are named less frequently than men by Roman historians. But while Roman women held no direct political power, those from wealthy or powerful families could and did exert influence through private negotiations. Exceptional women who left an undeniable mark on history include Lucretia and Claudia Quinta, whose stories took on mythic significance; fierce Republican-era women such as Cornelia, mother of the Gracchi, and Fulvia, who commanded an army and issued coins bearing her image; women of the Julio-Claudian dynasty, most prominently Livia (58 BC-AD 29) and Agrippina the Younger (15 AD-59 AD), who contributed to the formation of Imperial mores; and the empress Helena (c.250–330 AD), a driving force in promoting Christianity.

As with male members of society, elite women and their politically significant deeds eclipse those of lower-status women in the historical record. Inscriptions and especially epitaphs document the names of a wide range of women throughout the Roman Empire, but often tell little else about them. Some vivid snapshots of daily life are preserved in Latin literary genres such as comedy, satire, and poetry. The poems of Catullus and Ovid include women in Roman dining rooms, at sporting and theatrical events, shopping, putting on makeup, practicing magic, worrying about pregnancy — all, however, through male eyes. The published letters of Cicero show his interactions with his wife Terentia and daughter Tullia, and his speeches disparage the various ways Roman women could enjoy a free-spirited sexual and social life.

The one major public role reserved solely for women was in religion: the priestly office of the Vestals. Forbidden from marriage or sex for a period of thirty years, the Vestals devoted themselves to the study and correct observance of rituals which were deemed necessary for the security and survival of Rome but which could not be performed by the male colleges of priests.

=== Women in Pre-modern Italy ===
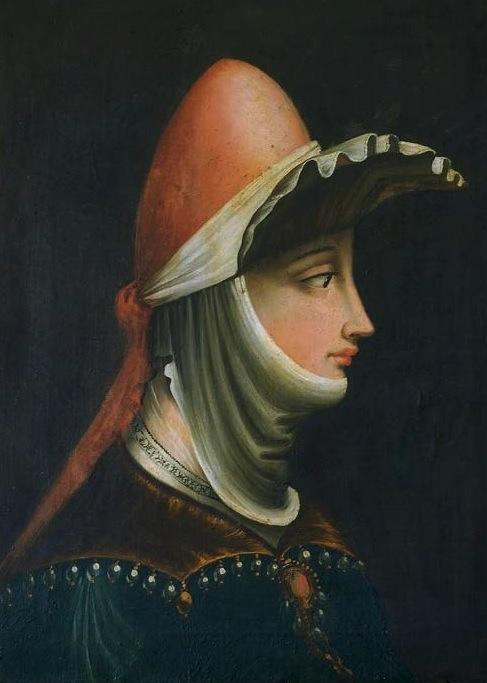
Matilde di Canossa, one of the most important governing figures of the Italian Middle Ages

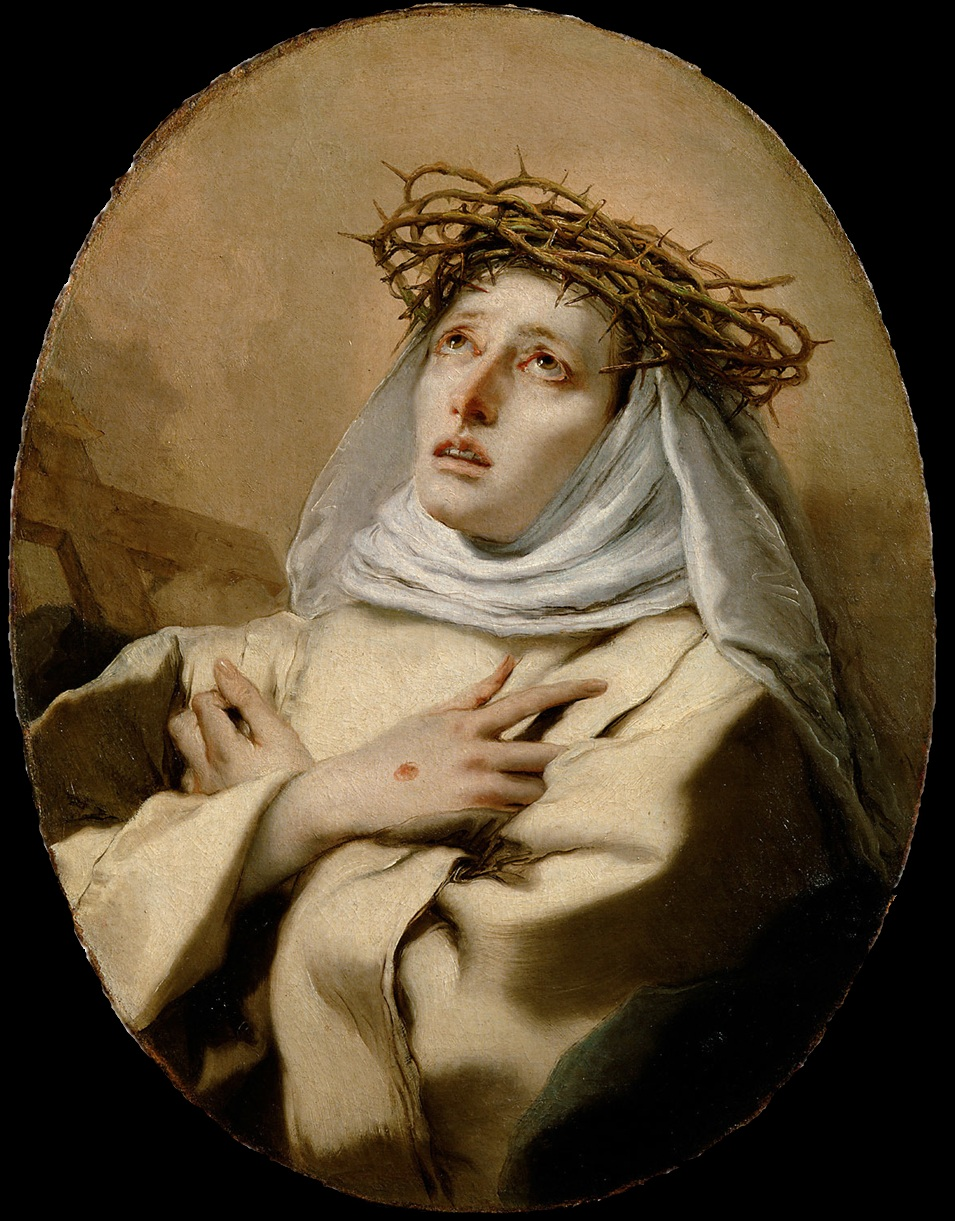
Catherine of Siena, a (co-)patron saint of Europe

During the Middle Ages, Italian women were considered to have very few social powers and resources, although some women inherited ruling positions from their fathers (such in the case of Matilde of Canossa). Educated women could find opportunities of leadership only in religious convents (such as Clare of Assisi and Catherine of Siena).

The Renaissance (15th–16th centuries) challenged conventional customs from the Medieval period. Women were still confined to the roles of "monaca, moglie, serva, cortigiana" ("nun, wife, servant, courtesan"). However, literacy spread among upper-class women in Italy and a growing number of them stepped out into the secular intellectual circles. Venetian-born Christine de Pizan wrote The City of Ladies in 1404, and in it she described women's gender as having no innate inferiority to men's, although being born to serve the other sex. Some women were able to gain an education on their own, or received tutoring from their father or husband.

Lucrezia Tornabuoni in Florence; Veronica Gambara at Correggio; Veronica Franco and Moderata Fonte in Venice; and Vittoria Colonna in Rome were among the renowned women intellectuals of the time. Laura Terracina of Naples was the most published Italian poet of the 16th century. Powerful women rulers of the Italian Renaissance, such as Isabella d'Este, Catherine de' Medici, or Lucrezia Borgia, combined political skill with cultural interests and patronage. Unlike her peers, Isabella di Morra (an important poet of the time) was kept a virtual prisoner in her own castle and her tragic life makes her a symbol of female oppression.

By the late 16th and early 17th centuries, Italian women intellectuals were embraced by contemporary culture as learned daughters, wives, mothers, and equal partners in their household. Among them were composers Francesca Caccini and Leonora Baroni, and painter Artemisia Gentileschi. Outside the family setting, Italian women continued to find opportunities in the convent, and now increasingly also as singers in the theatre (Anna Renzi—described as the first diva in the history of opera—and Barbara Strozzi are two examples). In 1678, Elena Cornaro Piscopia was the first woman in Italy to receive an academical degree, in philosophy, from the University of Padua.

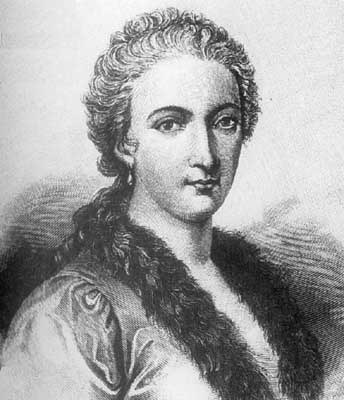
Maria Gaetana Agnesi, an Italian mathematician and linguist who was, according to Dirk Jan Struik, "the first important woman mathematician since Hypatia [5th century A.D.]".

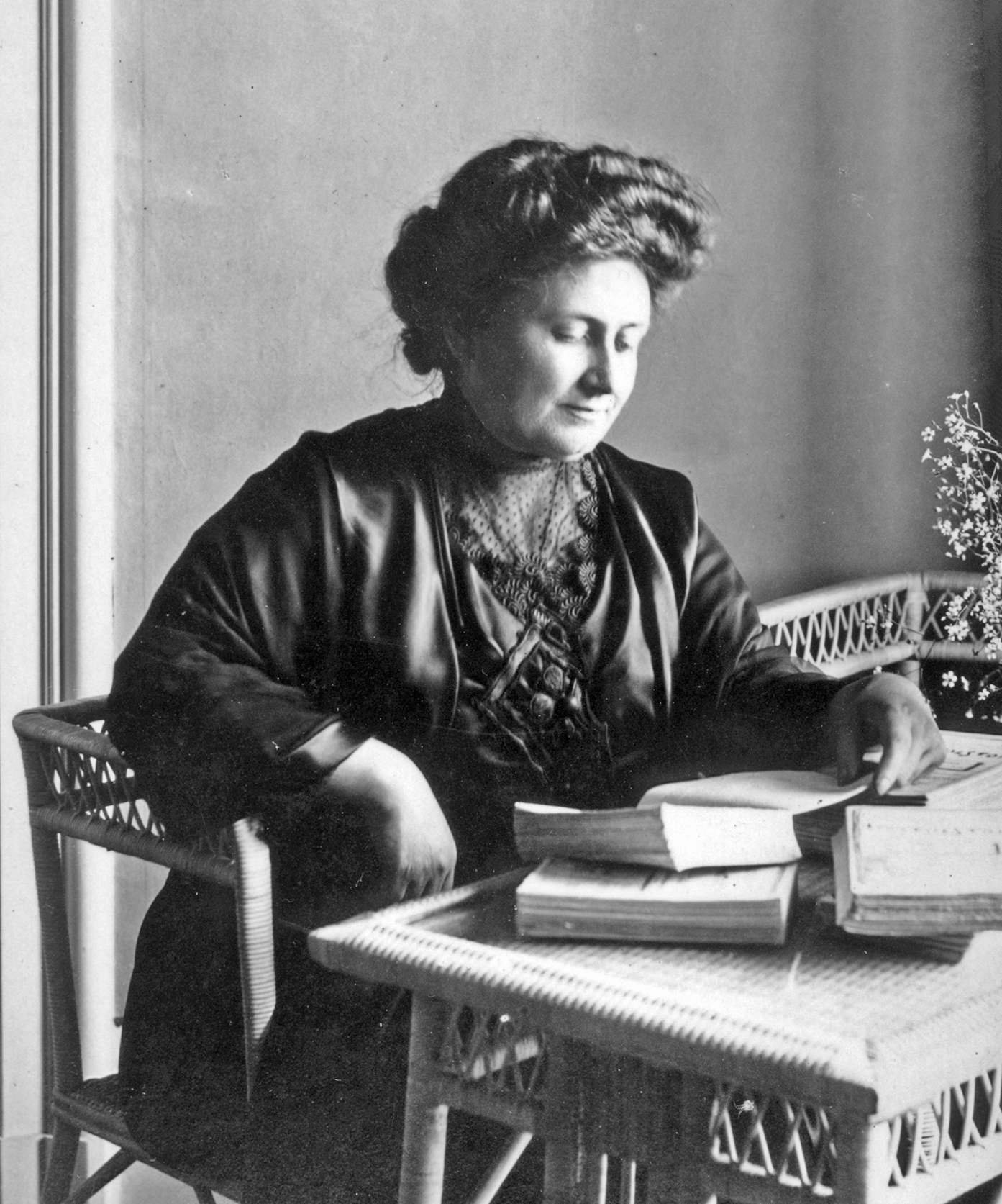
Maria Montessori, physician and educator best known for her philosophy of education and her writing on scientific pedagogy

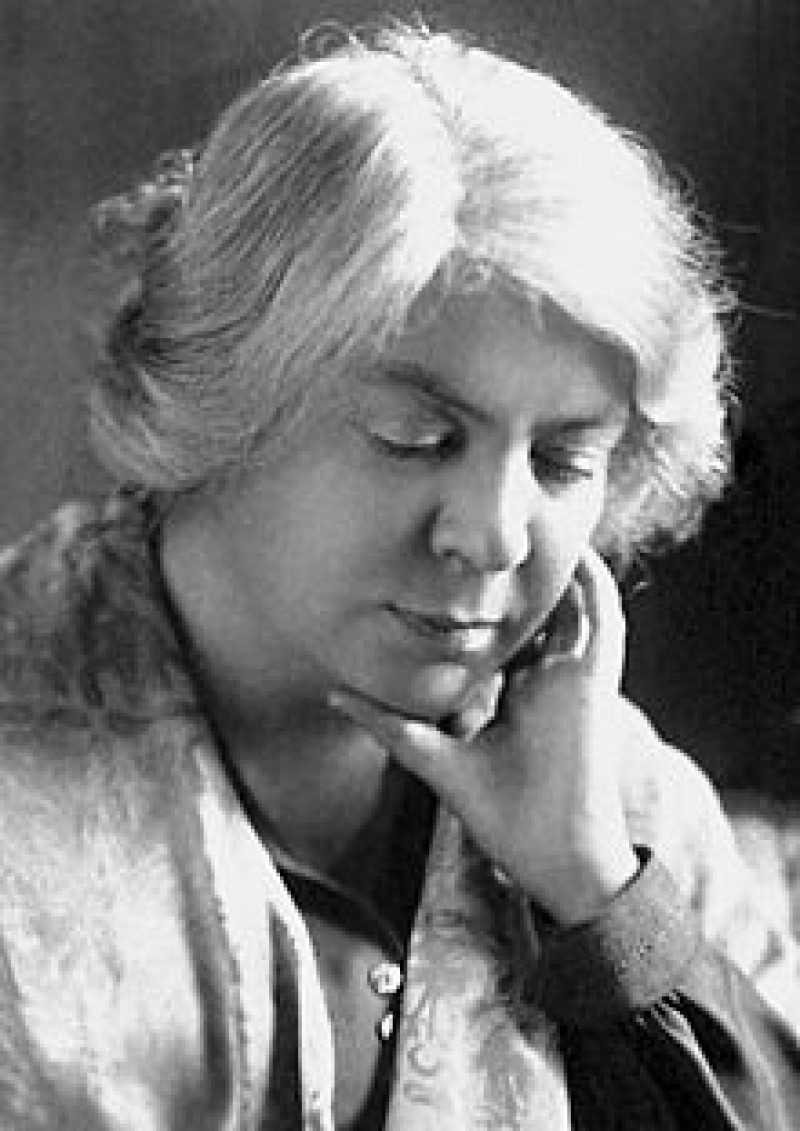
Grazia Deledda, 1926 Nobel Prize winner for Literature

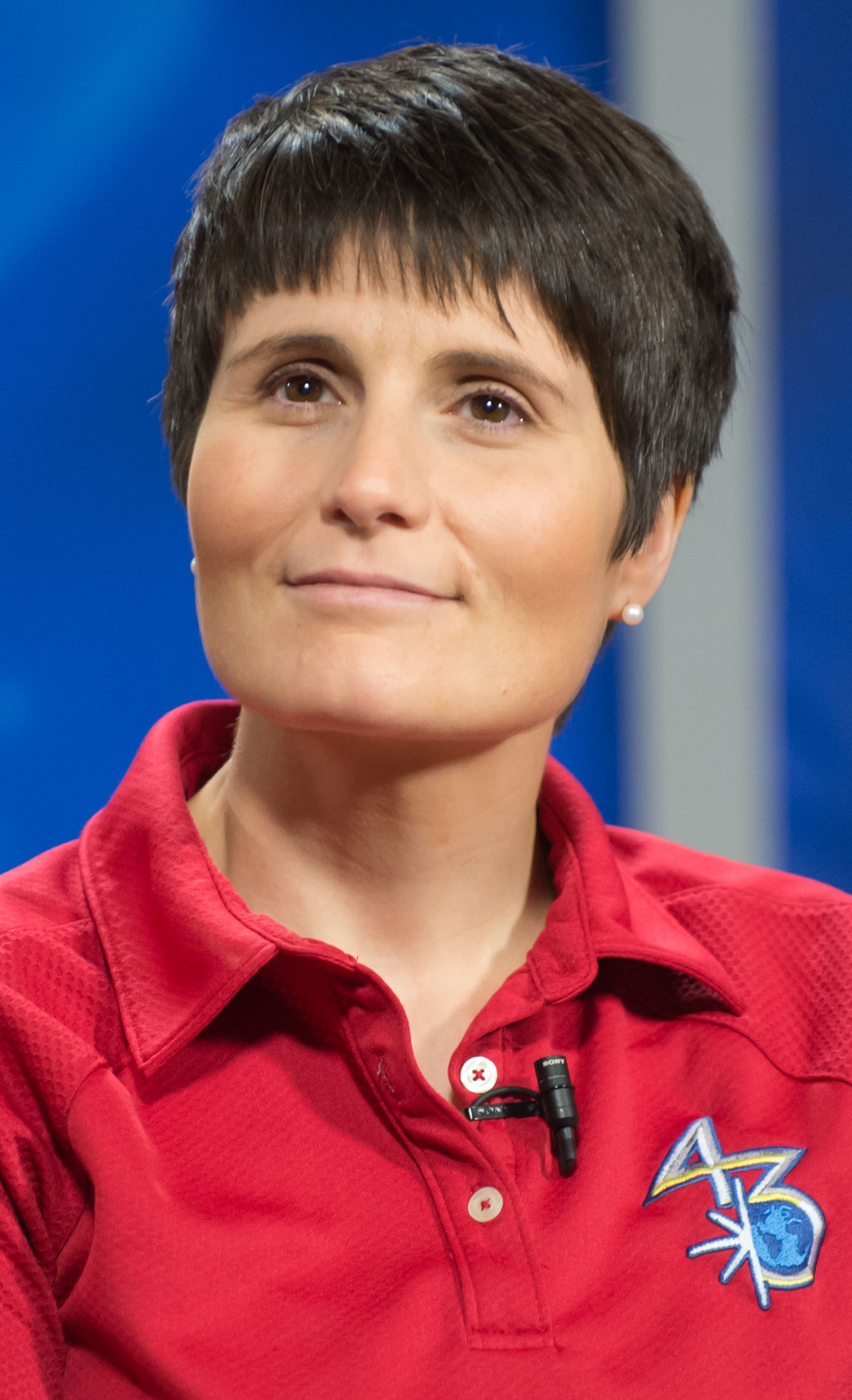
Samantha Cristoforetti, the first Italian woman in space. She holds the record for the longest uninterrupted spaceflight by a European astronaut (199 days, 16 hours).

In the 18th-century, the Enlightenment offered for the first time to Italian women (such as Laura Bassi, Cristina Roccati, Anna Morandi Manzolini, and Maria Gaetana Agnesi) the possibility to engage in the fields of science and mathematics. Italian sopranos and prime donne continued to be famous all around Europe, such as Vittoria Tesi, Caterina Gabrielli, Lucrezia Aguiari, and Faustina Bordoni. Other notable women of the period include painter Rosalba Carriera and composer Maria Margherita Grimani.

=== Women of the Risorgimento ===
The Napoleonic Age and the Italian Risorgimento offered for the first time to Italian women the opportunity to be politically engaged. In 1799 in Naples, poet Eleonora Fonseca Pimentel was executed as one of the protagonists of the short-lived Parthenopean Republic. In the early 19th century, some of the most influential salons where Italian patriots, revolutionaries, and intellectuals were meeting were run by women, such as Bianca Milesi Mojon, Clara Maffei, Cristina Trivulzio di Belgiojoso, and Antonietta De Pace. Some women even distinguished themselves in the battlefield, such as Anita Garibaldi (the wife of Giuseppe Garibaldi), Rosalia Montmasson (the only woman to have joined the Expedition of the Thousand), Giuseppina Vadalà, who along with her sister Paolina led an anti-Bourbon revolt in Messina in 1848, and Giuseppa Bolognara Calcagno, who fought as a soldier in Garibaldi's liberation of Sicily.

=== The Kingdom of Italy (1861–1925) ===
Between 1861 and 1925, women were not permitted to vote in the new Italian state. In 1864, Anna Maria Mozzoni triggered a widespread women's movement in Italy, through the publication of Woman and her social relationships on the occasion of the revision of the Italian Civil Code (La donna e i suoi rapporti sociali in occasione della revisione del codice italiano). In 1868, Alaide Gualberta Beccari began publishing the journal "Women" in Padua. In the late 19th-century, the women's movement organized to campaign for women's rights, such as the Lega promotrice degli interessi femminili in 1880 and the Associazione per la donna in 1896.

A growing percentage of young women were now employed in factories, but were excluded from political life and were particularly exploited. Under the influence of socialist leaders, such as Anna Kuliscioff, women became active in the constitution of the first Labour Unions. In 1902, the first law to protect the labour of women and children was approved and limited women to twelve hours of work per day.

By the 1880s, women were making inroads into higher education. In 1877, Ernestina Puritz Manasse-Paper was the first woman to receive a university degree in modern Italy, in medicine, and in 1907 Rina Monti became the first female department chair and full professor in an Italian University.

The most famous women of the time were actresses Eleonora Duse, Lyda Borelli, and Francesca Bertini; writers Matilde Serao, Sibilla Aleramo, Carolina Invernizio, and Grazia Deledda (who won the 1926 Nobel Prize in Literature); sopranos Luisa Tetrazzini and Lina Cavalieri; and educator Maria Montessori.

Montessori was Italy's first female physician and developed the Montessori education method, which is still in use today. She was part of Italy's change to further give women rights, and she was an influence to educators in Italy and around the globe.

=== Under the Fascist regime (1925–1945) ===
Women's rights suffered a setback under the Fascist government of Benito Mussolini, with fascist ideology dictating procreation as a woman's duty.

Women were directed to fulfill the role prescribed to them by party ideology via the Fascist women's organizations, such as the Massaie Rurali (MR) and the Sezione Operaie e Lavoranti a Domicilio, for rural and urban working-class women respectively under the Fasci Femminili. Girls were included by the creation of youth groups for girls, separated by age class, such as the Piccole Italiane (for girls age 8–12) and the Giovani Italiane (13–18).

Initially, Fascism had an ambivalent view on women's position, and Mussolini promised the leader of the Fascist women, Elisa Majer Rizzioli, to introduce women's suffrage. However, he only introduced municipal suffrage in 1925 and then abolished free elections altogether, making also the municipal suffrage meaningless. After an unsuccessful attempt of the Fascist women to become autonomous in 1924, they were efficiently deprived of all real political influence within the party: after 1930, the Fascist women organizations did not even have a leader, the leadership post of the Fasci Femminili being first left vacant, and from 1937 divided between several people.

The role of women in Fascist ideology was foremost to demonstrate her patriotism and supporting her country by giving birth to children which she would raise to become soldiers or mothers who in turn would support expansionism. While girls were not banned from studying, the cost for women students were raised to discourage it; and while women were not banned from working, certain restrictions were introduced to prevent women from being placed in authority over men in the professional life, such as banning women from certain leadership positions in the educational system which could have given them authority over male colleagues.

In 1927 the Jewish Women's Union Associzione delle Donne Ebree d'Italia (ADEI) was established and committed itself to feminism, anti-fascism, as well as Zionism. The ADEI was founded by Berta Cammeo Bernstein and Gabriella Falco Ravenna.

A series of laws tried to force Italian women back to their roles of wives and mothers. Any political activity by women was harshly repressed; in 1930 antifascist activist Camilla Ravera was sentenced to 15 years in prison. The only woman to whom some political prominence was given during the early Fascist period was Margherita Sarfatti; she was Benito Mussolini's biographer in 1925 as well as one of his mistresses.

The racial laws of 1938 inflicted another blow to women's empowerment in Italy, since a large percentage of the few Italian women to have academic positions were of Jewish descent, from Anna Foà to Enrica Calabresi.

More than 50,000 women, mostly in their twenties, took part in the Italian resistance movement during the Italian Civil War, when Italy was under German occupation (1939-1945). Their mass participation increased the involvement of women in Italian political life.

=== The Italian Republic (1945–present) ===
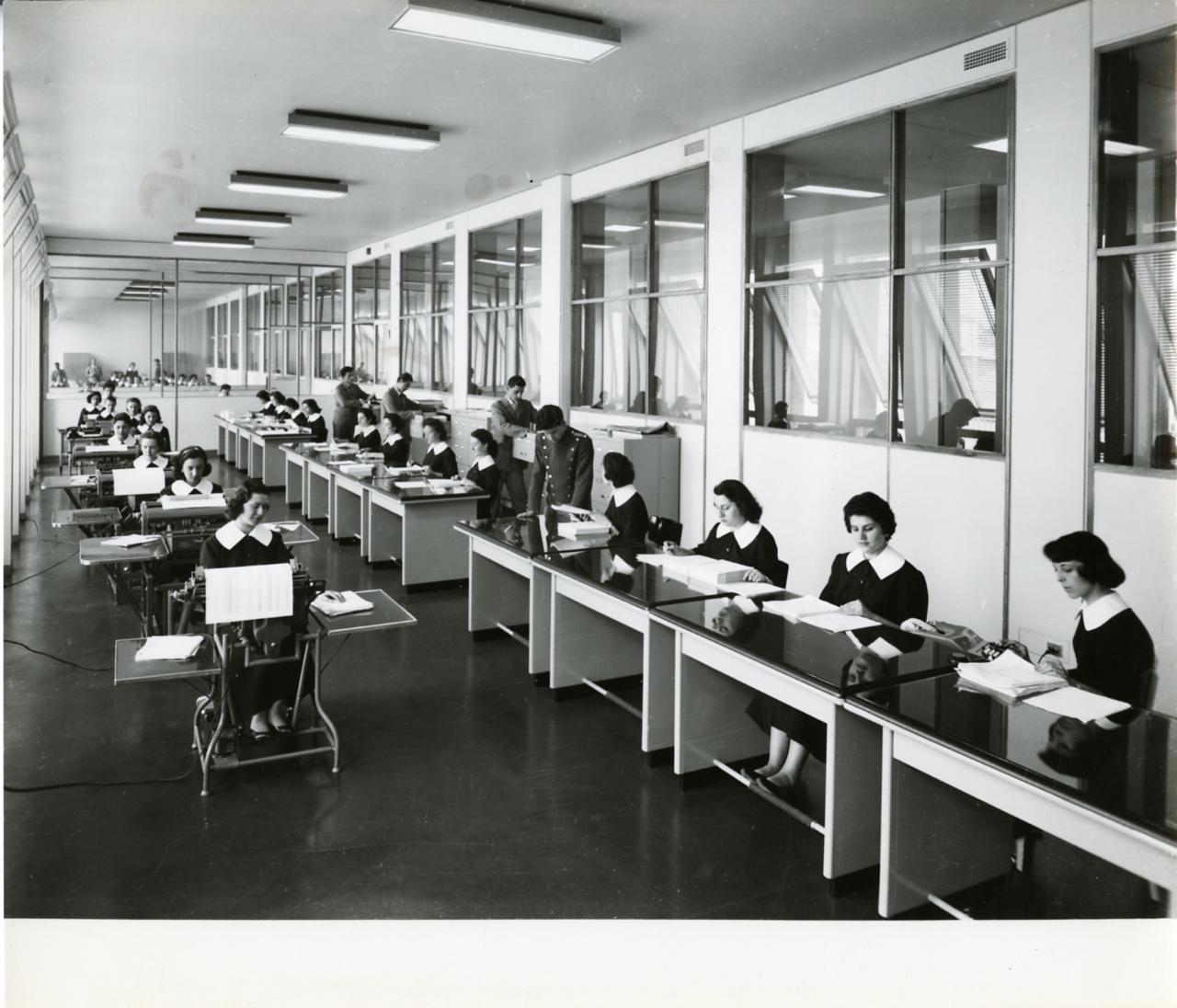
Female workers employed in a big office in Milan, 1960. Photo by Paolo Monti.

After World War II, women were given the right to vote in 1946 Italian institutional referendum. The new Italian Constitution of 1948 affirmed that women had equal rights. It was not however until the 1970s that women in Italy scored some major achievements with the introduction of laws regulating divorce (1970), abortion (1978), and the approval in 1975 of the new family code.

Famous women of the period include politicians Nilde Iotti, Tina Anselmi, and Emma Bonino; actresses Anna Magnani, Sophia Loren, Monica Bellucci and Gina Lollobrigida; soprano Renata Tebaldi; ballet dancer Carla Fracci; costume designer Milena Canonero; sportwomen Sara Simeoni, Deborah Compagnoni, Valentina Vezzali, and Federica Pellegrini; writers Natalia Ginzburg, Elsa Morante, Alda Merini, and Oriana Fallaci; architect Gae Aulenti; scientist and 1986 Nobel Prize winner Rita Levi-Montalcini; astrophysicist Margherita Hack; astronaut Samantha Cristoforetti; pharmacologist Elena Cattaneo; and CERN Director-General Fabiola Gianotti.

In 2022, Giorgia Meloni became the first female Prime Minister of Italy.

== Issues in present time ==
Today, women have the same legal rights as men in Italy, and have mainly the same job, business, and education opportunities.

=== Abortion ===
The maternal mortality rate in Italy is 4 deaths/100,000 live births (as of 2010), one of the lowest in the world. The HIV/AIDS rate is 0.3% of adults (aged 15–49)—estimates of 2009.

Abortion was legalized for the first 90 days of pregnancy in 1978; it is still only legal during the first trimester, while at later stages of pregnancy it is permitted only for medical reasons, such as problems with the health of the mother or fetal defects. However, in practice, there have been difficulties in obtaining an abortion, due to the rising number of doctors and nurses who refuse to perform an abortion based on moral/religious opposition, which they are legally allowed to do. It has been reported that 67% of unintended pregnancies in Italy have managed to successfully result in abortions. The abortion ratio in 2018 was 173.8 per 1,000 live births.

=== Marriage and family ===
Divorce in Italy was legalized in 1970. Obtaining a divorce in Italy is still a lengthy and complicated process, requiring a period of legal separation before it can be granted, although the period of separation has been reduced in 2015. A law of 2022 made it simpler for processes started since March 1, 2023. Adultery was decriminalized in 1969, after the Constitutional Court of Italy struck down the law as unconstitutional, because it discriminated against women. In 1975, Law No. 151/1975 provided for gender equality within marriage, abolishing the legal dominance of the husband.

Unmarried cohabitation in Italy and births outside of marriage are not as common as in many other Western countries, but in recent years they have increased. In 2017, 30.9% of all births were outside of marriage, but there are significant differences by regions, with unmarried births being more common in the North than in the South. Italy has a low total fertility rate, with 1.32 children born/woman (in 2017), which is below the replacement rate of 2.1. Of women born in 1968, 20% stayed childless. In the EU, only Greece, Spain, Cyprus, Poland, and Portugal have a lower total fertility rate than Italy.

=== Female education ===
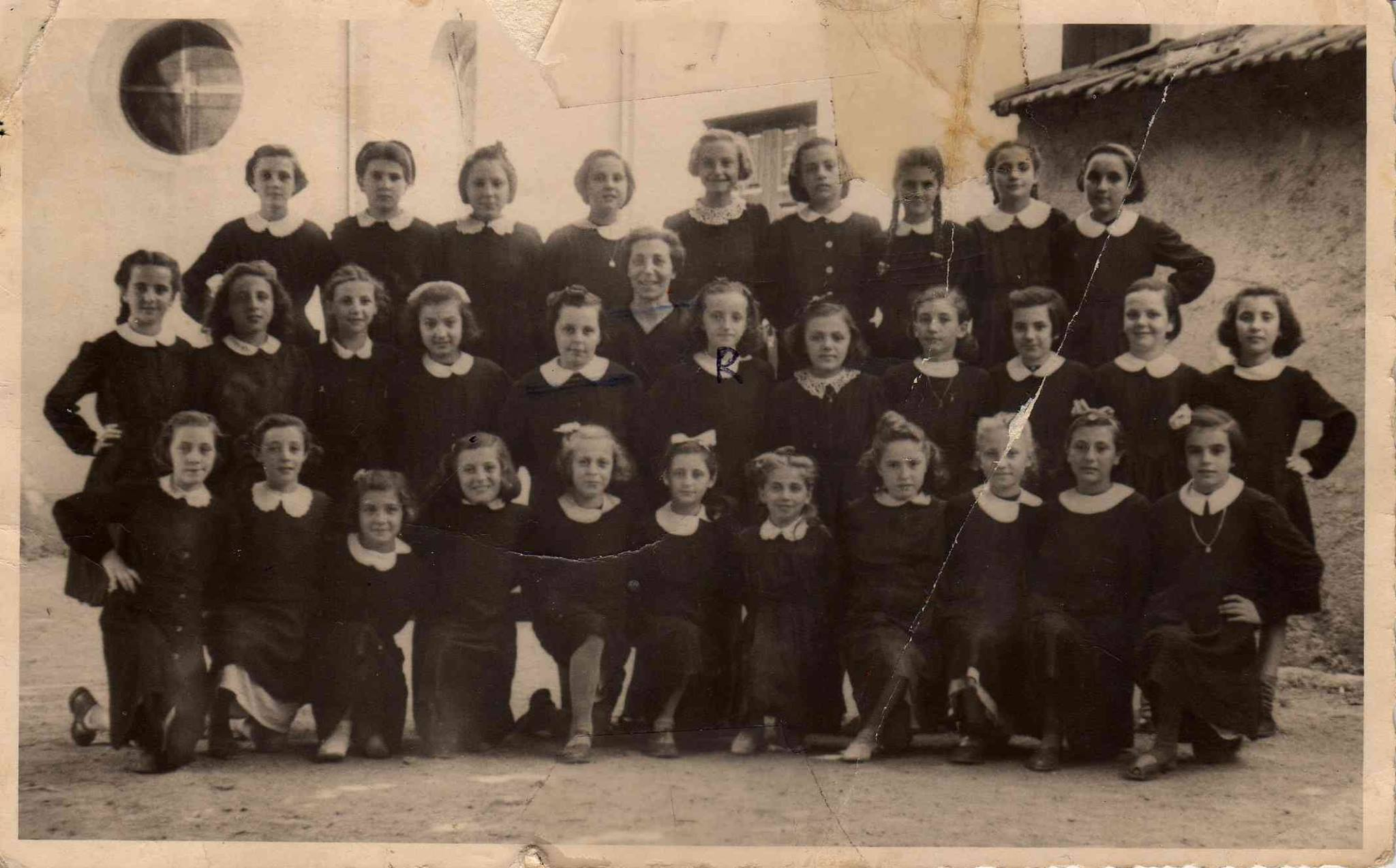
School girls, 1949/1950

Women in Italy tend to have highly favorable results, and mainly excel in secondary and tertiary education. Ever since the Italian economic miracle, the literacy rate of women as well as university enrolment has gone up dramatically in Italy. The literacy rate of women is only slightly lower than that of men (as of 2011, the literacy rate was 98.7% female and 99.2% male). Sixty percent of Italian university graduates are female, and women are excellently represented in all academic subjects, including mathematics, information technology, and other technological areas which are usually occupied by males.

=== Work ===
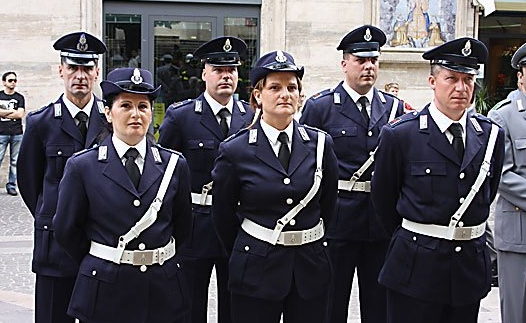
Both male and female Polizia Penitenziaria officers in Itay

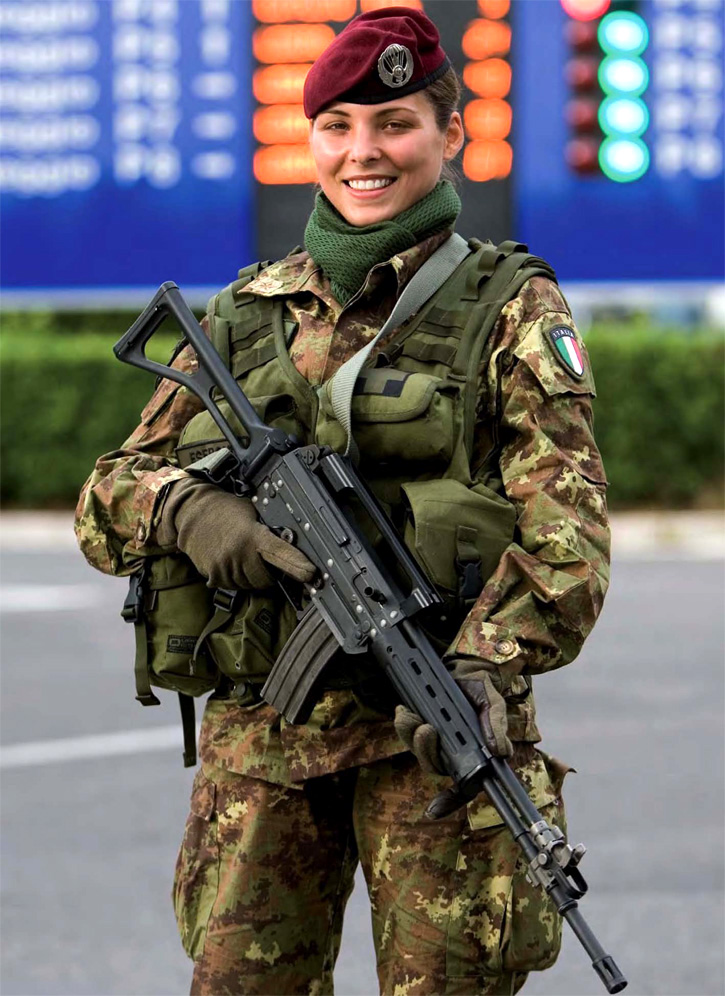
A female Italian soldier from the Italian Army's Paratroopers Brigade "Folgore".

Female standards at work are generally of a high quality and professional, but are not as good as in education. The probability of a woman getting employed is mainly related to her qualifications, and 80% of women who graduate from university go on to seek jobs. Women in Italy face a number of challenges. Although gender roles are not as strict as they have been in the past, sexual and domestic abuse is still quite prevalent in Italy. On average, women do 3.7 hours more housework than men. Men make up the majority of the parliament but more than a third of the seats are held by women (around 36%, a higher rate than countries like Netherlands and Germany, as well as the average EU rate), which makes Italy the eighth country the EU by percentage of women in the national parliament. Additionally, women in Italy are not adequately represented in the workforce, as Italy has one of the lowest rates of employment for women of the countries within the European Union. Women's employment rate (for ages 15–64) is 47.8% (in 2015), compared to 66.5% for men. Many women are still frequently expected to stay at home and care for the house and children, as opposed to earning a salary and becoming a breadwinner, and few senior managerial positions are held by women. Furthermore, there are unequal standards and expectations for the few women who actually make it into a professional setting. Women cannot be fired because of pregnancy, by law, as on 26 March 2001 the Legislative Decree number 151 was released, to protect pregnant women at work. An infamous practice in Italy used to be that of "white resignation" (dimissione in bianco), whereby female employees are asked as condition for their employment or promotion to sign undated resignation papers, which were kept by the employer who added a date on them when the woman was pregnant so that she "resigns" at that date. Yet this practice, which is illegal, did not specifically affect women, as it used to be done for both male and female employers. Italian lawmakers are working to further protect and support women as they break gender stereotypes and join the workforce, but complete cultural change is slow. Nevertheless, the proportion of women in the workforce has increased in recent years: according to World Bank, in 1990 women made up 36.3% of the labour force, while by 2016 they made up 42.1%.

=== Pay ===
Looking at the situation of individual countries and according to data dating back to 2019 in Italy, the gap is 5%: but it is not as it seems. The figure does not take into account some determining factors that characterize the labor market in Italy, such as the female employment rate, the different professional qualifications. According to the first thematic gender report carried out by AlmaLaurea in 2020, in Italy women study and achieve better results, but are still less paid. The survey surveyed 291,000 graduates from 2020, and 655,000 graduates from 2019, 2017 and 2015, interviewed one, three and five years after graduation. The survey showed that in 2020 women made up almost 60% of graduates in Italy and the results, in terms of regularity in studies and graduation grades, are better for women: 60.2% of women complete their studies on time, compared to 55.7% of men and the average graduation grade is, 103.9 and 102.1/110, respectively.

At work, the scenario is changing and the gender gap is dramatically emerging. Five years after graduation, 86% of women have found a job compared to 92.4% of men, and the gap can only widen if they have children. Not only that, men are more likely to be self-employed or employed with a permanent contract (64.5% for women compared to 67.4% for men among first-level graduates; 52.2% and 59.1% among second-level graduates); Women, on the other hand, are entitled to more non-standard contracts, mainly fixed-term contracts (17.0% of women compared to 12.2% for men among first-level graduates; 18.9% and 11.5% among second-level graduates). €1,374 for women and €1,651 for men; Among second-level graduates, the salary amounts to €1,438 and €1,713 respectively.

In terms of salary, the gender pay gap is therefore confirmed: five years after graduation, women are paid 20% less than men. Among first-level graduates, the salary for women is €1,374 and €1,651 for men; Among second-level graduates, the salary amounts to €1,438 and €1,713 respectively.[69]

=== Culture and society ===
Today, there is a growing acceptance of gender equality, and people (especially in the North) tend to be far more liberal towards women getting jobs, going to university, and doing stereotypically male things. However, in some parts of society, women are still stereotyped as being simply housewives and mothers, also reflected in the fact of a higher-than-EU average female unemployment.

Ideas about the appropriate social behaviour of women have traditionally had a very strong impact on the state institutions, and it has long been held that a woman's 'honour' is more important than her well-being. Until the 1970s, rape victims were often expected and forced to marry their rapist. In 1965, Franca Viola, a 17-year-old girl from Sicily, created a sensation when she refused to marry the man who kidnapped and raped her. In refusing this "rehabilitating marriage" to the perpetrator, she went against the traditional social norms of the time which dictated such a solution. Until 1981, the Criminal Code itself supported this practice, by exonerating the rapist who married his victim. The Franca Viola incident was made into a movie called La moglie più bella.

In 2000 female toplessness was officially legalized (in a nonsexual context) in all public beaches and swimming pools throughout Italy (unless otherwise specified by region, province or municipality by-laws) on 20 March 2000, when the Supreme Court of Cassation (through sentence No. 3557) determined that the exposure of the nude female breast, after several decades, was considered a "commonly accepted behavior", and therefore, "entered into the social costume".

In more recent times the media, particularly TV shows, have been accused of promoting sexist stereotypes. In 2017, one talk-show of a state-owned broadcaster was cancelled after accusations that it promoted discriminatory views of women.

=== Violence against women ===
In 2020, statistics showed that a third of women were exposed to violence; 8 out of 10 female murder victims were murdered by a current or previous partner. From 2000 to 2012, 2200 women were killed and 75% of those were murdered by a former or current partner. This represented about one murder every two days. A 2012 United Nations report noted that 90% of women who were raped or abused in Italy did not report the crime to police.

The infographic shows the women murdered in Italy in 2022, highlighting the type of relationship between the women and the authors of the homicide. Each woman is depicted in her own individuality, indicating the age group she belongs to.

Italy has taken steps to address violence against women and domestic violence, including creating Law No. 38 of 23 April 2009. Italy has also ratified the Convention on preventing and combating violence against women and domestic violence.

Regardless of these data, Italy has got a rate of murders of women equal to 0.43 (much lower than the rate of the murders of men), placing Italy at the fifth place by lowest rate of murders of women in the EU. Moreover, the trend has been decreasing since 1992.

Until the 1970s, in Southern Italy rape victims were often expected and forced to marry their rapist. In 1965, Franca Viola, a 17-year-old girl from Sicily, created a sensation when she refused to marry the man who kidnapped and raped her. In refusing this "rehabilitating marriage" to the perpetrator, she went against the traditional social norms of the time which dictated such a solution. In 1976 in the Supreme Court of Italy ruled that "the spouse who compels the other spouse to carnal knowledge by violence or threats commits the crime of carnal violence" [meaning rape] ("commette il delitto di violenza carnale il coniuge che costringa con violenza o minaccia l’altro coniuge a congiunzione carnale"). As well, in 1981, Italy repealed Article 544; this article stated that if a man who raped a woman married his victim, even if she was a minor, any sexual offence would lapse.

Traditionally, as in other Mediterranean-European areas, the concept of family honour was very important in Italy. Indeed, until 1981, the Criminal Code provided for mitigating circumstances for so-called honour killings. Traditionally, honour crimes used to be more prevalent in Southern Italy.

In Rome in 1992, a 45-year-old driving instructor was accused of rape. When he picked up an 18-year-old girl for her first driving lesson, he allegedly raped her for an hour, then told her that if she was to tell anyone he would kill her. Later that night she told her parents and her parents agreed to help her press charges. While the alleged rapist was convicted and sentenced, the Supreme Court of Cassation overturned the conviction in 1998 because the victim wore tight jeans. It was argued that she must have necessarily have had to help her attacker remove her jeans, thus making the act consensual ("because the victim wore very, very tight jeans, she had to help him remove them...and by removing the jeans...it was no longer rape but consensual sex"). The court stated in its decision "it is a fact of common experience that it is nearly impossible to slip off tight jeans even partly without the active collaboration of the person who is wearing them." This ruling sparked widespread feminist protest. The day after the decision, women in the Italian Parliament protested by wearing jeans and holding placards that read "Jeans: An Alibi for Rape." As a sign of support, the California Senate and Assembly followed suit. Soon Patricia Giggans, executive director of the Los Angeles Commission on Assaults Against Women, (now Peace Over Violence) made Denim Day an annual event. As of 2011 at least 20 U.S. states officially recognize Denim Day in April. Wearing jeans on this day has become an international symbol of protest against erroneous and destructive attitudes about sexual assault. In 2008 the Supreme Court of Cassation overturned the ruling, so there is no longer a "denim" defense to the charge of rape.

In 1996, Italy amended its rape laws, toughening the punishment for sexual assault and reclassifying it from a moral offense to a criminal felony.

After a few cases of infibulation practiced by complaisant medical practitioners within the African immigrant community came to public knowledge through media coverage, the Law n°7/2006 was passed in Italy on 1/9/2006, becoming effective on 1/28/2006, concerning "Measures of prevention and prohibition of any female genital mutilation practice"; the Act is also known as the Legge Consolo ("Consolo Act") named after its primary promoter, Senator Giuseppe Consolo. Article 6 of the law integrates the Italian Penal Code with Articles 583-Bis and 583-Ter, punishing any practice of female genital mutilation "not justifiable under therapeutical or medical needs" with imprisonment ranging from 4 to 12 years (3 to 7 years for any mutilation other than, or less severe than, clitoridectomy, excision or infibulation). Penalty can be reduced up to 2/3 if the harm caused is of modest entity (i.e. if partially or completely unsuccessful), but may also be elevated up to 1/3 if the victim is a minor or if the offense has been committed for profit. An Italian citizen or a foreign citizen legally resident in Italy can be punished under this law even if the offense is committed abroad; the law will as well afflict any individual of any citizenship in Italy, even illegally or provisionally. The law also mandates any medical practitioner found guilty under those provisions to have his/her medical license revoked for a minimum of six up to a maximum of ten years.

In 2025, a law was enacted adding femicide to the criminal code of Italy, and making it punishable by life in prison. Femicide under this law applies to women being killed as an “act of hatred or discrimination,” or “an act of control or possession or domination”, as well as women being killed because they wish to leave a relationship, and women being killed when there is an effort to restrict their “individual freedoms”.

== Gallery ==
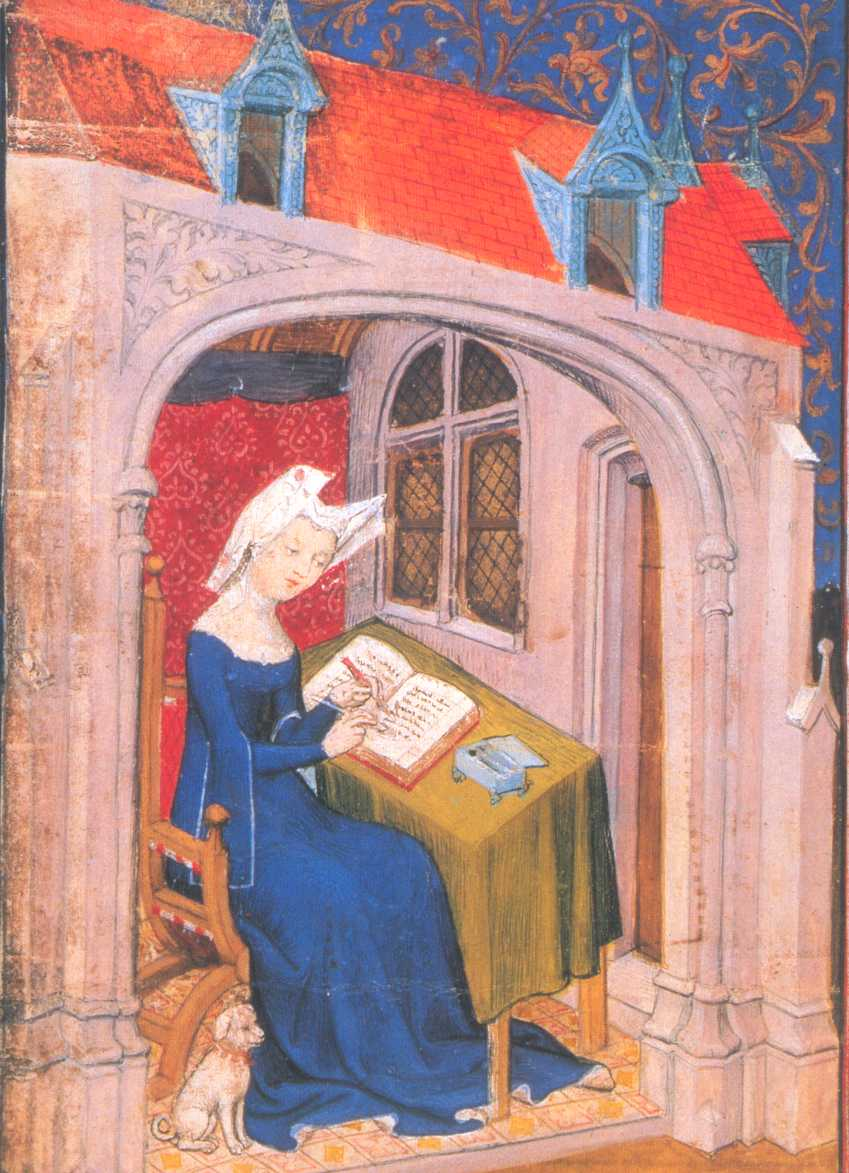
Christine de Pizan

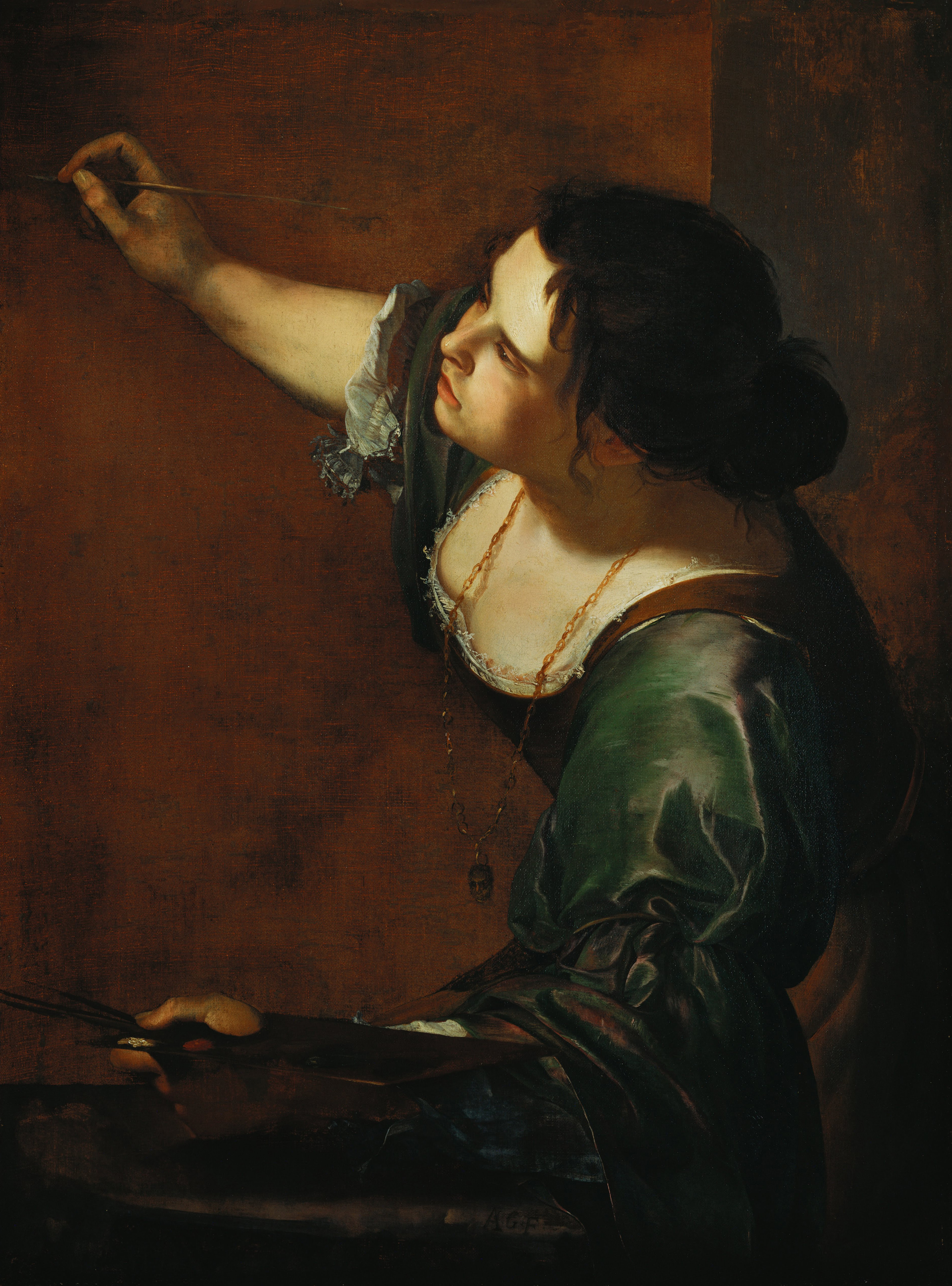
Artemisia Gentileschi

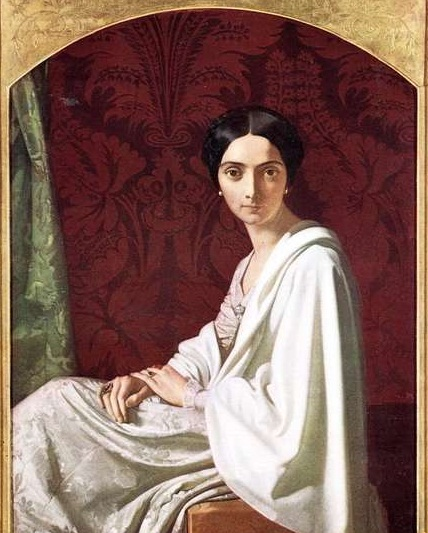
Cristina Trivulzio di Belgiojoso

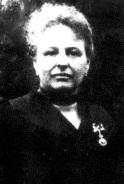
Anna Maria Mozzoni

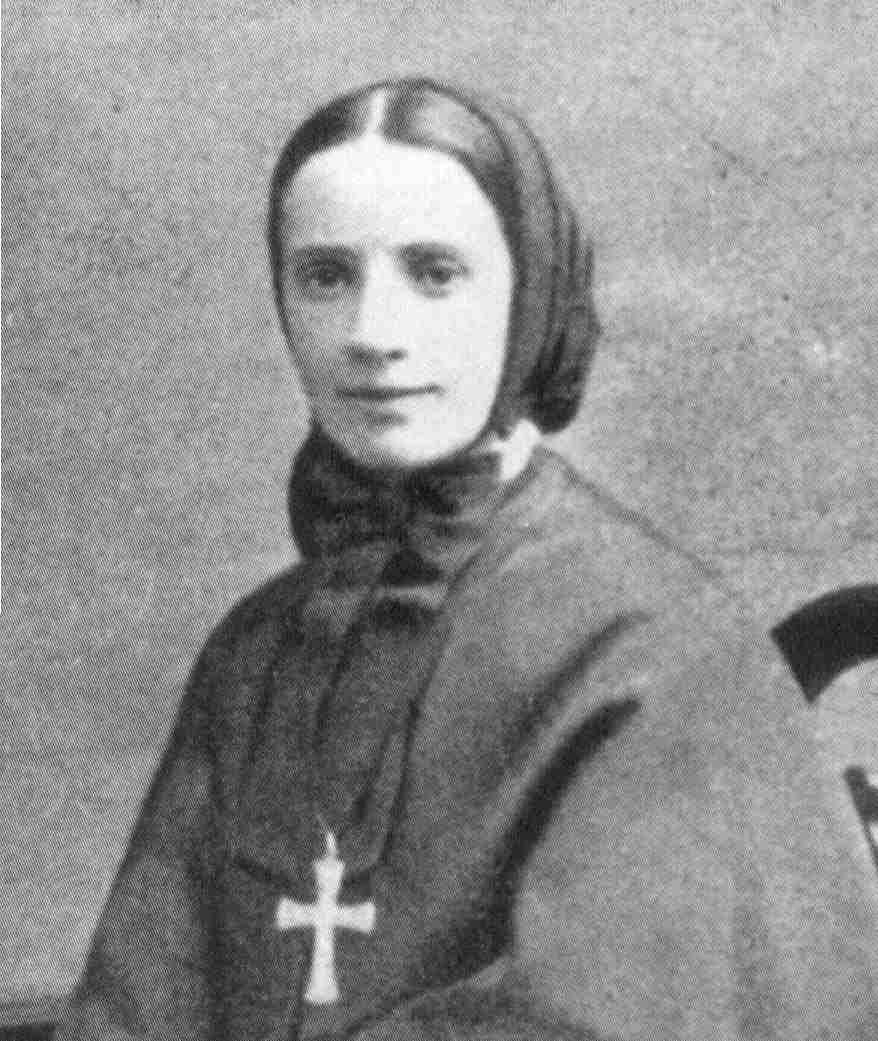
Francesca Saverio Cabrini

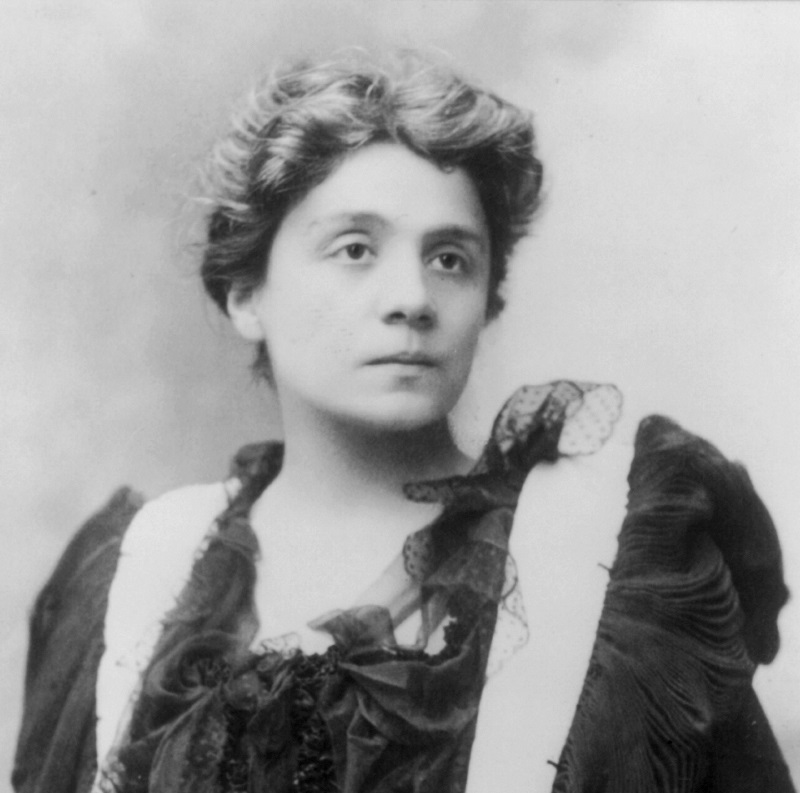
Eleonora Duse

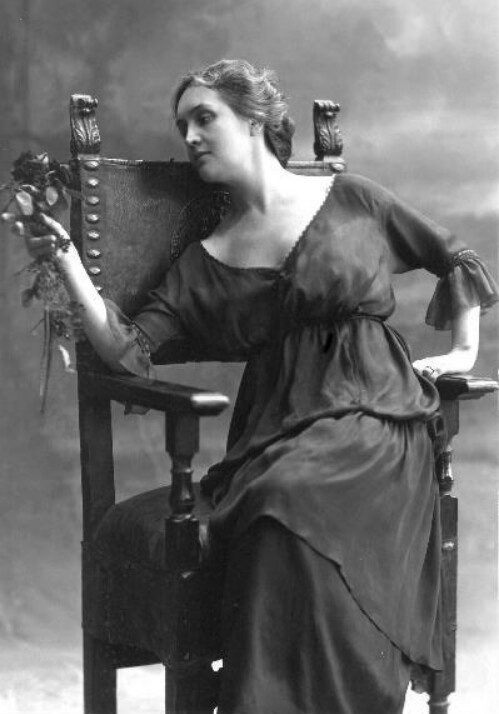
Sibilla Aleramo

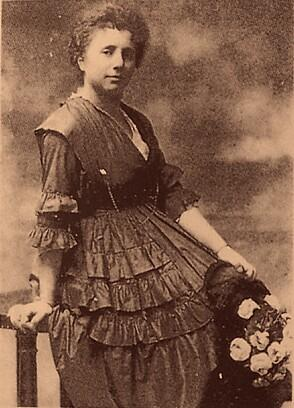
Margherita Sarfatti

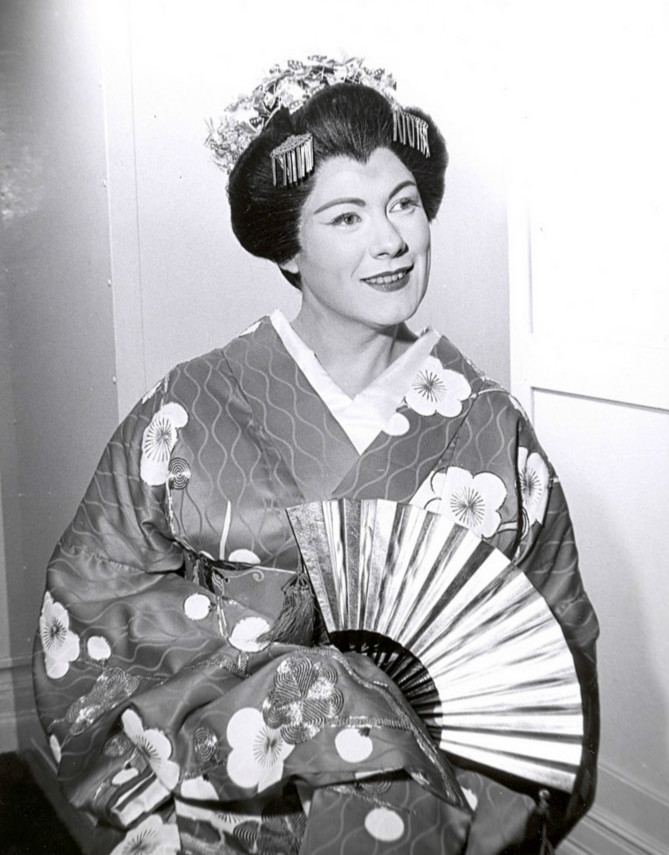
Renata Tebaldi

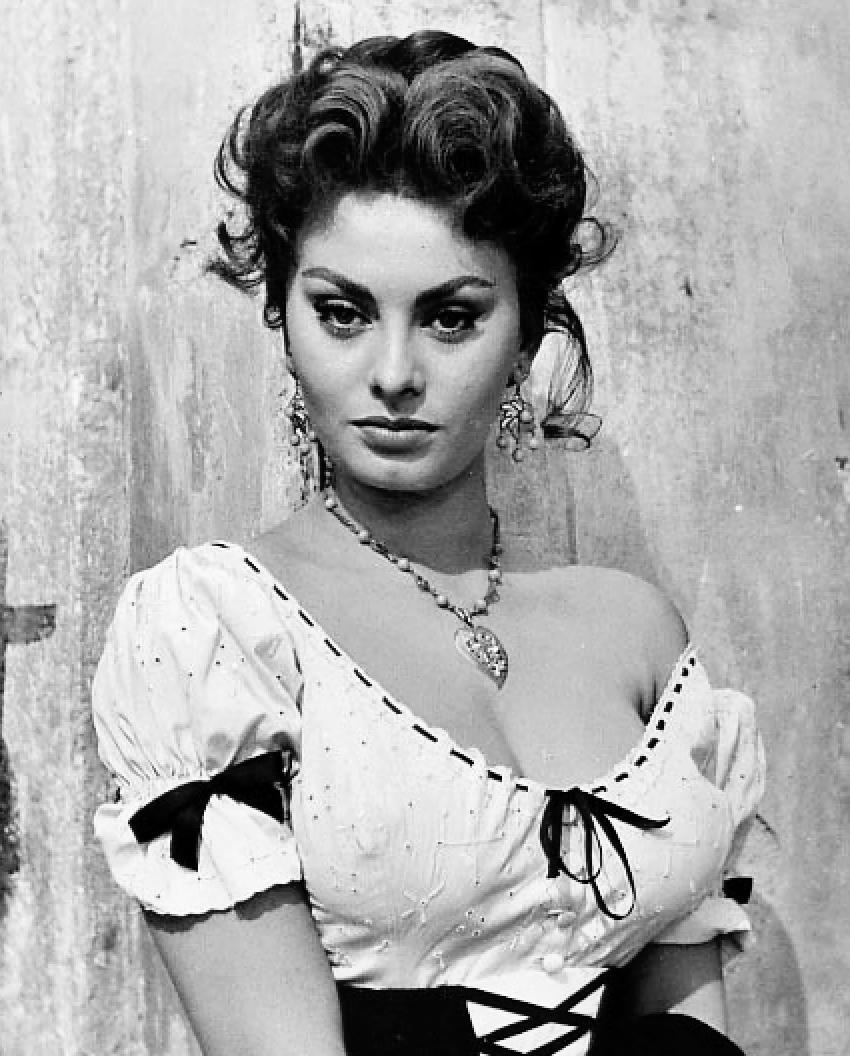
Sophia Loren

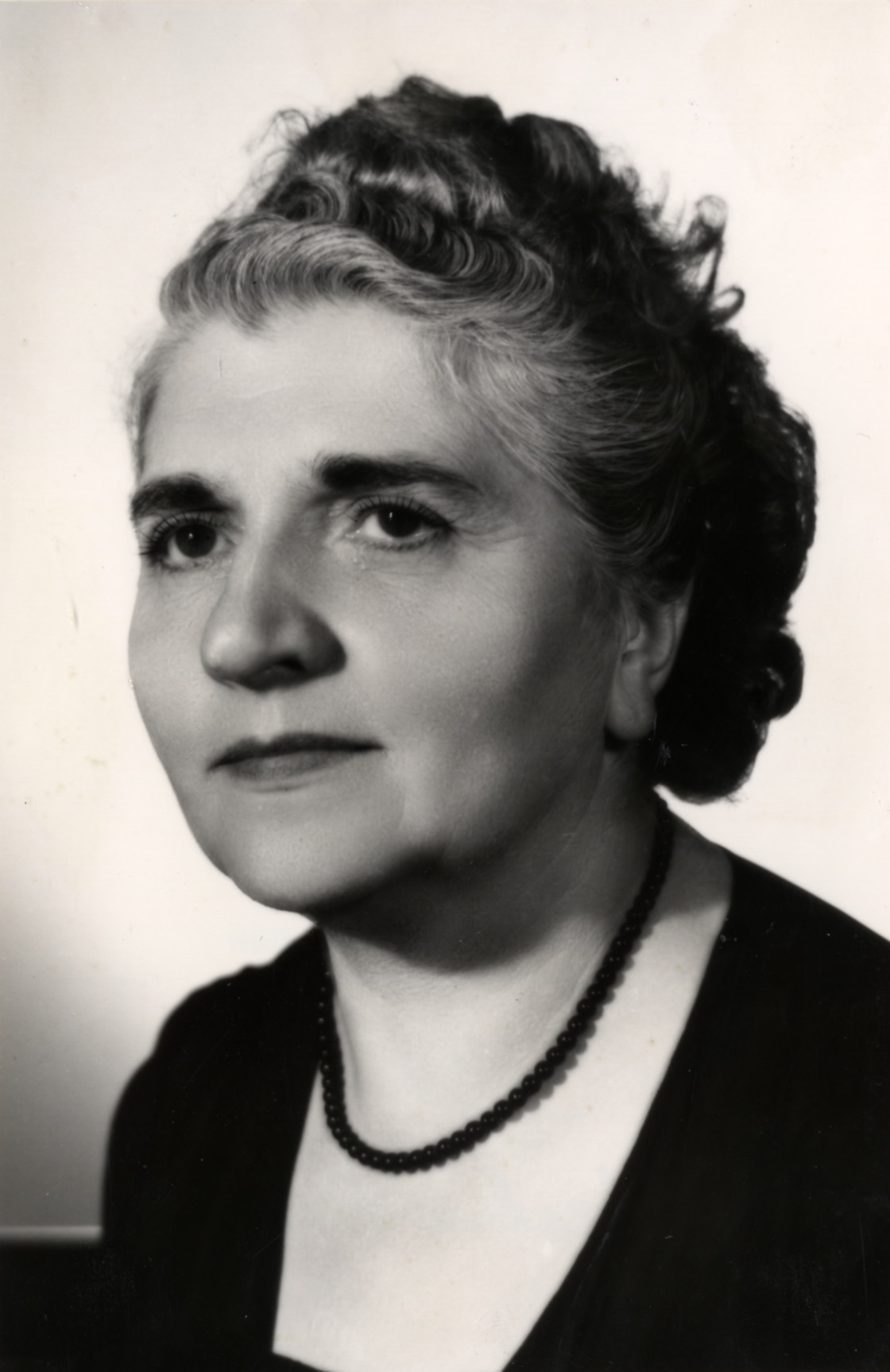
Lina Merlin

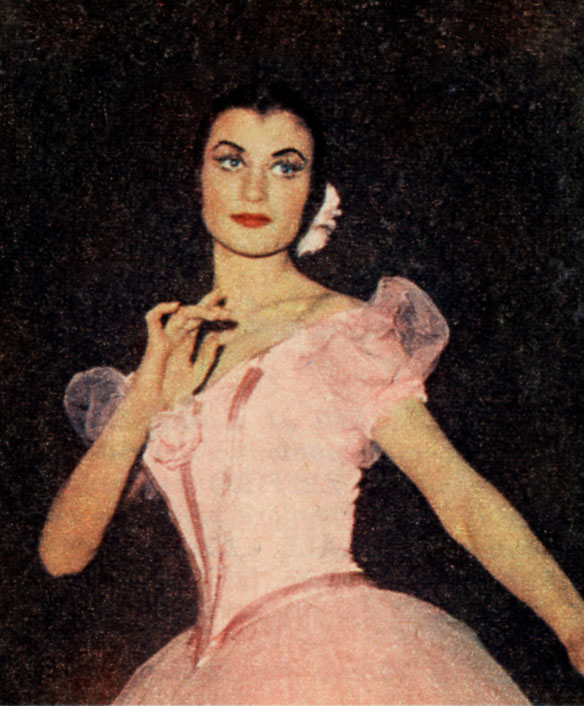
Carla Fracci

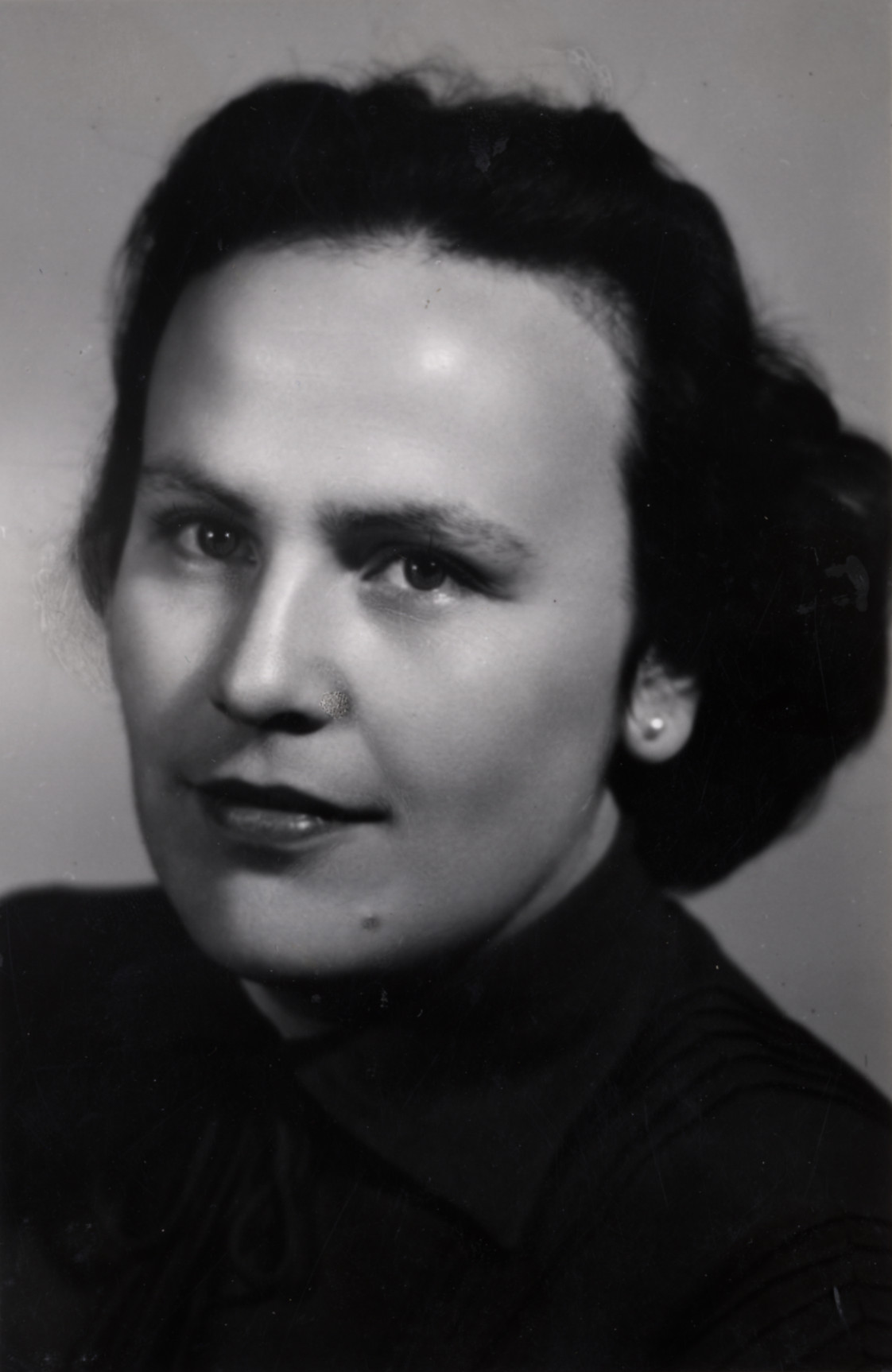
Nilde Iotti

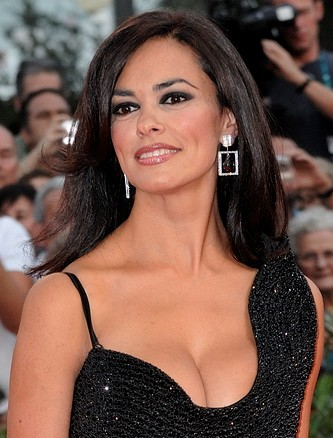
Maria Grazia Cucinotta

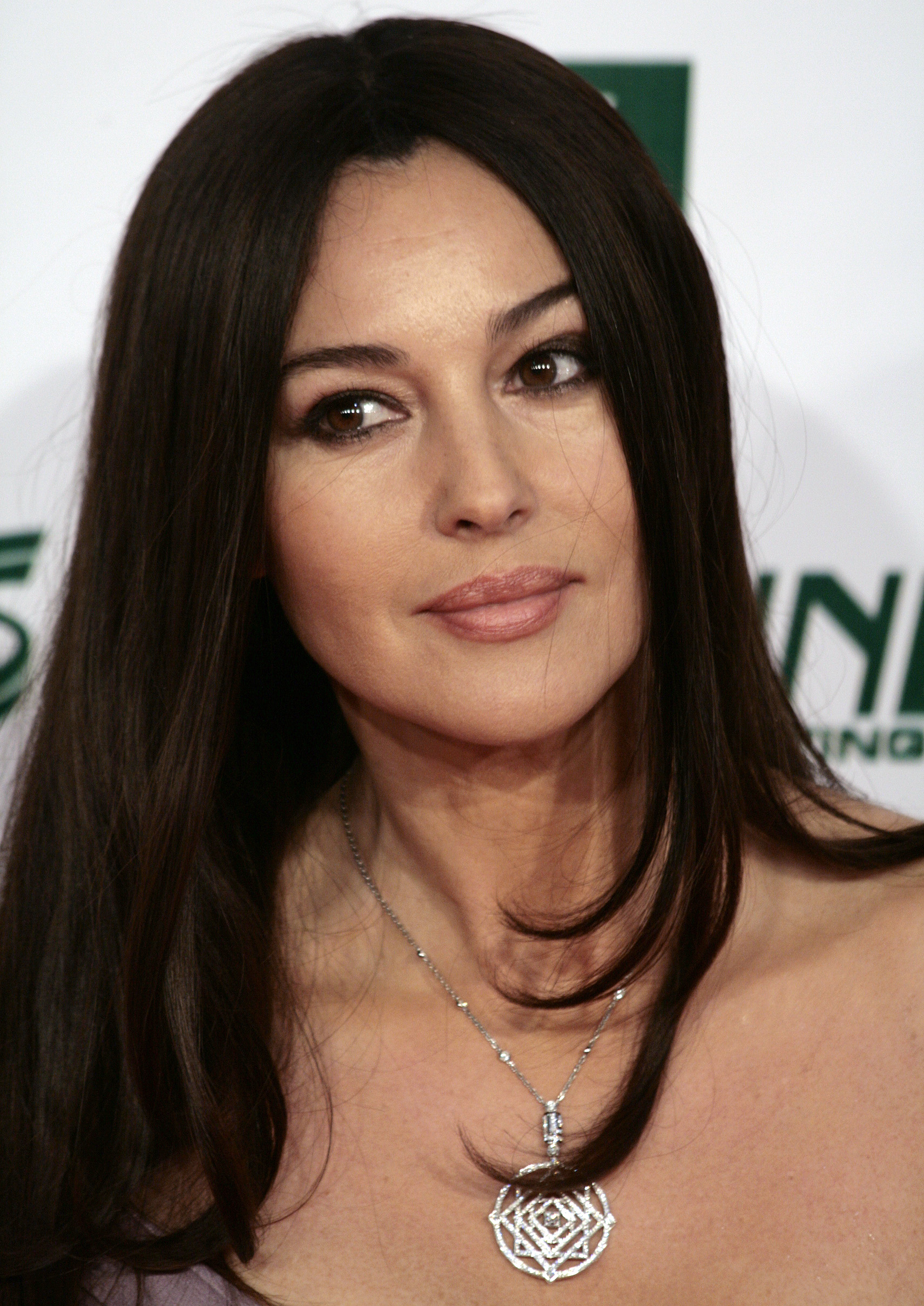
Monica Bellucci

== Bibliography ==
- Aa.Vv. Il Novecento delle Italiane. Una storia ancora da raccontare. Roma: Editori Riuniti, 2001.
- Addis Saba, Marina. Partigiane. Le donne della resistenza. Milano: Mursia, 1998.
- Bellomo, Manlio. La condizione giuridica della donna in Italia: vicende antiche e moderne. Torino: Eri, 1970.
- Boneschi, Marta. Di testa loro. Dieci italiane che hanno fatto il Novecento. Milano: Monadori, 2002.
- Bruni, Emanuela, Patrizia Foglia, Marina Messina (a cura di). La donna in Italia 1848-1914. Unite per unire. Cinisello Balsamo, Milano: Silvana, 2011.
- Craveri, Benedetta. Amanti e regine. Il potere delle donne. Milano: Adelphi, 2005.
- Dal Pozzo, Giuliana. Le donne nella storia d'Italia. Torino: Teti, 1969.
- De Giorgio, Michela. Le italiane dall'Unità a oggi: modelli cultuali e comportamenti sociali. Roma-Bari: Laterza, 1992.
- Drago, Antonietta. Donne e amori del Risorgimento. Milano: Palazzi, 1960.
- Grazia, Victoria de. How Fascism Ruled Women: Italy, 1922-1945. Berkeley: University of California Press, 1993.
- Matthews-Grieco, Sara F. (a cura di). Monaca, moglie, serva, cortigiana: vita e immagine delle donne tra Rinascimento e Controriforma. Firenze: Morgana, 2001.
- Migliucci, Debora. Breve storia delle conquiste femminili nel lavoro e nella società italiana. Milano: Camera del lavoro metropolitana, 2007.
- Roccella, Eugenia, e Lucetta Scaraffa. Italiane (3 voll.). Roma: Dipartimento per le pari opportunita', 2003.
- Rossi-Doria, Anna (a cura di). A che punto è la storia delle donne in Italia. Roma: Viella, 2003.
- Willson, Perry. Women in Twentieth-Century Italy. Palgrave Macmillan, 2009.

== See also ==
- Feminism in Italy
- Women in ancient Rome
- Women in Europe
