= Clara Franceschini =

Italian politician (1900–?)

Clara Franceschini (born 1900) was an Italian politician of the National Fascist Party (PNF).

== Biography ==
Franceschini was born in a poor family in Pavia in 1900. She became a member of the Fascist Party in 1921, was a co-founder of the Pavia Branch of the Fasci Femminili (FF Provincial Fiduciary) and served as its President in 1925-1937. She worked as a holiday camp director and was the Director of the Pavia children's summer camps.

She was appointed to succeed Tina Marino as President of the Massaie Rurali in December 1936. In 1937, she was also appointed President of the Sezione Operaie e Lavoranti a Domicilio (SOLD), and Vice President of the Opera Nazionale Maternità ed Infanzia (OMNI).

In 1937, she was appointed leader of the Fascist women, which was the highest position for a woman in the Fascist Party. The national leadership of the Fascist women's organization, the Fasci Femminili, was left vacant after Angiola Moretti in 1930. There were only leaders of the local branches until the national oversight committee was established in 1937, in which Franceschini and Giuditta Stelluti Scala Frascara were appointed as inspectors by Achille Starace in a shared leadership position, followed in 1938 by an additional four: Wanda Bruschi Gorjux, Laura Marani Argnani, Teresita Menzinger Ruata and Olga Medici del Vascello. To be a member of the Fasci Femminili, or the women's groups under its umbrella, was the only way for a woman to be a part of the Fascist Party, which otherwise excluded women from all formal positions within the party.

Franceschini had a strong position within the Fascist Party and has been referred to as the most important woman within the Party in the late 1930s.In 1938 Mussolini contemplated to have women represented higher in the party hierarchy, and suggested to appoint Franceschini the first woman to serve in the Chamber of Fasces and Corporations, but he withdrew the nomination due to opposition from the traditional minded members of the Fascist Grand Council.
