= Fasci Femminili =

Fascisti women organization (1920–1945)

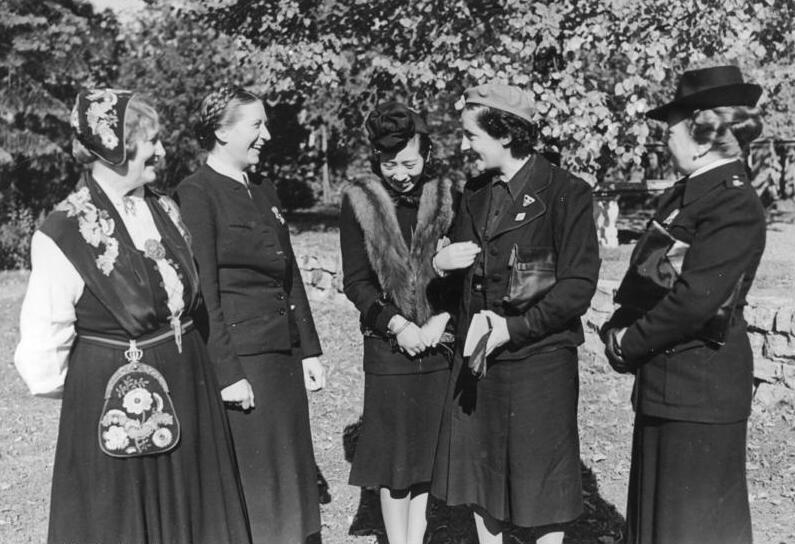
Left to right: Olga Bjoner, Gertrud Scholtz-Klink, Toyoko Ōshima, Pilar Primo de Rivera, and Olga Medici del Vascello in 1941

Fasci Femminili (FF) ("Female Groups") was the women's section of the Italian Fascist Party (PNF). The FF was founded in 1919 and disbanded in 1945. It incorporated all the other Fascist organizations for women and girls, which were all formally sections of the FF.

== History and organization ==
Its purpose was to instruct women in their role according to fascist ideology. The FF met some hostility from male members of the party. When it was formally created in 1920, having then informally existed since 1919, it was almost unique, since other Italian political parties did not include women in their parties. It was reorganized to become a voluntary mass organization in 1929. In practice, the majority of their work was charitable and social work, which was used to instruct women in the ideology of the party and to give the party good publicity.

During the 1920s, the women active within the Fascist Party were mostly educated, middle-class women. Girls were included by the creation of youth groups for girls, separated by age class, such as the Piccole Italiane (for girls age 8–12) and the Giovani Italiane (13–18).

In 1925, the section Opera Nazionale Maternità ed Infanzia (ONMI) was created to support married mothers and children, which was essentially a charity organization managed by the FF-women.

The Massaie Rurali (MR) was founded in 1933 and the Sezione Operaie e Lavoranti a Domicilio (Section for Female Laborers and Home-workers or SOLD) in 1937, both intended to include rural and urban working-class women respectively within the PNF. The FF had 750.000 members in 1939. All these groups were formally sections of the FF.

== Activities and ideology ==
Initially, Fascism had an ambivalent view on women's position, and Mussolini promised the leader of the Fascist women, Elisa Majer Rizzioli, to introduce women's suffrage. However, he only introduced municipal suffrage and then abolished free elections altogether, making also the municipal suffrage meaningless. After an unsuccessful attempt of the Fascist women to become autonomous in 1924, they were efficiently deprived of all real political influence within the party. In May 1926, when the Fasci Femminili demanded that they be allowed to wear black shirts, Augusto Turati, then secretary of the National Fascist Party, responded: "the black shirt is the virile symbol of our revolution and has nothing do with the welfare tasks that Fascism has given women." After 1930, the Fascist women organizations did not even have a leader, the leadership post of the Fasci Femminili being first left vacant, and from 1937 divided between several people.

The role of women in Fascist ideology was foremost to demonstrate her patriotism and support her country by giving birth to children which she would raise to become soldiers or mothers who in turn would support expansionism. While girls were not banned from studying, the cost for women students were raised to discourage it; and while women were not banned from working, certain restrictions were introduced to prevent women from being placed in authority over men in the professional life, such as banning women from certain leadership positions in the educational system which could have given them authority over male colleagues.

== Leadership ==
The Presidents of the Fasci Femminili were Elisa Majer Rizzioli (until 1926) and then Angiola Moretti in 1926–1930. The position was vacant in 1930–1937, followed by a shared leadership by women called Ispettrice Nazionale (national inspectress). In 1937, there were two national inspectresses: Clara Franceschini and Giuditta "Itta" Stelluti Scala Frascara; they were followed by four in 1938: Wanda Bruschi Gorjux, Laura Marani Argnani, Teresita Menzinger Ruata and Olga Medici del Vascello, and in 1940 by: Anna Maria Giusti Dalla Rosa, Angiola Moretti, Ignazia Cavalli d'Olivola, and Sofia Bertaina Chiesa di Cervignasco.

Chairman

- 1919-1926: Elisa Majer Rizzioli
- 1926-1930: Angiola Moretti
- 1930-1937: National leadership vacant, only leaders of the local sections.
- 1937-1938: Co-leadership between two "inspectrice": Clara Franceschini and Giuditta Stelluti Scala Frascara.
- 1938-1945: Co-leadership between six "inspectrice": Wanda Bruschi Gorjux, Laura Marani Argnani, Teresita Menzinger Ruata, and Olga Medici del Vascello.
