= Olga Medici del Vascello =

Italian fascist politician (1882–1966)

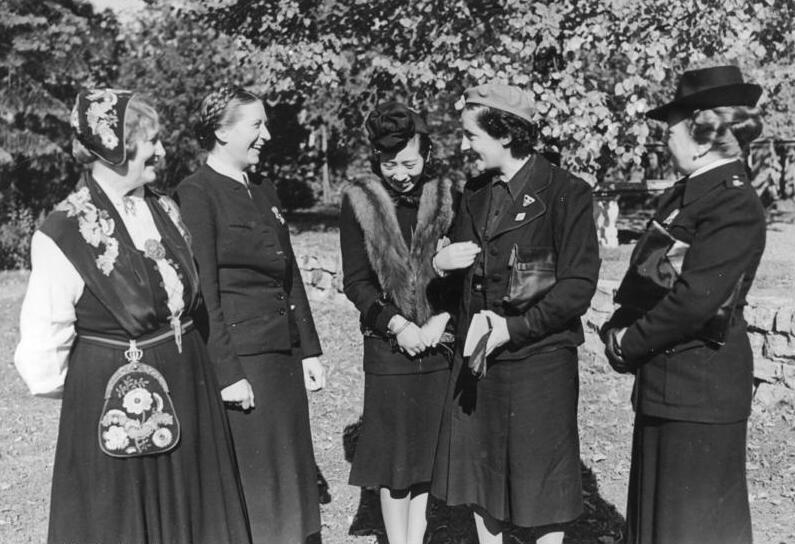
L.t.r. Olga Bjoner, Gertrud Scholtz-Klink, Toyoko Ōshima, Pilar Primo de Rivera, and Olga Medici del Vascello in 1941

Olga Medici del Vascello (1882–1966) was an Italian politician of the National Fascist Party (PNF).

== Biography ==
She was born to the rich merchant Carlo Giovanni Napoleone Leumann and Amalia Cerutti. She married the nobleman Marquess Giacomo Medici del Vascello, Mussolini's chief of cabinet.

In 1930, the national leadership of the Fascist women's organization, the Fasci Femminili, was left vacant after Angiola Moretti. There were only leaders of the local branches until the national oversight committee was established in 1937, in which Clara Franceschini and Giuditta Stelluti Scala Frascara were appointed as inspectors by Achille Starace in a shared leadership position, followed in 1938 by an additional four: Wanda Bruschi Gorjux, Laura Marani Argnani, Teresita Menzinger Ruata and Olga Medici del Vascello. To be a member of the Fasci Femminili, or the women's groups under its umbrella, was the only way for a woman to be a part of the Fascist Party, which otherwise excluded women from all formal positions within the party.

In 1939, she received Gertrud Scholtz-Klink in Italy. Eugen Dollmann described her during this occasion:

"The Marchesa Olga Medici del Vascello was a leading member of the aristocracy and the wife of a Secretary of State. It was my impression that she only took part in the Party's womanly high jinks (which Italian males leered at with their habitual sense of the habitual sense of the erotic) because her activities brought her, at least occasionally, into contact with her idol. This idol was not Starace, whom she regarded as a buffoon, but Benito Mussolini, whom she admired with passionate fervour. [...] She was a witty and sharp-tongued belle laide who resembled an Italian version of Princess Pauline Metternich, once the queen of the Viennese drawing-rooms. She was also a woman of sternly monarchistic views-yet another of the anomalis which the Duce permitted under his regime".

In 1941, she attended the International Fascist women's conference in Nazi Germany with the German and Spanish right wing women. In April 1942, she received the General Secretary of the Spanish Francoist women's organization to facilitate a closer collaboration between the organizations across borders.
