= Bjoner =

Bjoner is a surname. Notable people with the surname include:

- Ingrid Bjoner (1927–2006), Norwegian soprano
- Olga Bjoner (1887–1969), Norwegian journalist, organizational leader and Nazi politician
