= Menzinger =

Menzinger is a surname. Notable people with the surname include:

- Kathrin Menzinger (born 1988), Austrian dancer
- Michael Menzinger (1792–1877), Governor of Liechtenstein
- Teresita Menzinger Ruata, Italian politician
- Vittorio Menzinger (1861-1925), Italian politician

== See also ==
- The Menzingers, American punk rock band
