= Giuditta Stelluti Scala Frascara =

Italian fascist politician

Giuditta "Itta" Stelluti Scala Frascara was an Italian politician of the National Fascist Party (PNF).

== Biography ==
She was a professional nurse, who studied pediatrics in London and spoke four languages. She was a writer of social topics under the male pseudonym Elio Silvestri. She was a rich and owned considerable property in Rome and in the Abruzzi. She became known as a nursing and welfare expert.

She became a member of the Fascist Party in 1927, and fiduciary of the Roman women's group in 1933.

In 1930, the national leadership of the Fascist women's organization, the Fasci Femminili, was left vacant after Angiola Moretti. There were only leaders of the local branches until the national oversight committee was established in 1937, in which Clara Franceschini and Giuditta Stelluti Scala Frascara were appointed as inspectors by Achille Starace in a shared leadership position, followed in 1938 by an additional four: Wanda Bruschi Gorjux, Laura Marani Argnani, Teresita Menzinger Ruata and Olga Medici del Vascello. To be a member of the Fasci Femminili, or the women's groups under its umbrella, was the only way for a woman to be a part of the Fascist Party, which otherwise excluded women from all formal positions within the party. Stelluti Scala Frascara was appointed primarily to act as a liaison party-run charities and their royal patronesses.
