= Angiola Moretti =

Italian fascist politician

Angiola Moretti (1899 - ) was an Italian politician of the National Fascist Party (PNF).

She was from Brescia. She worked as a middle school teacher. She was a veteran of the Fiume legionnaire, and became a member of the PNF in 1923.

She served as the President of the Fascist state women's organization, the Fasci Femminili, between 1926 and 1930, being appointed by Augusto Turati after Elisa Majer Rizzioli was forced to resign. Young and unmarried, the Fascist Ester Lombardo praised the appointed with the comment that young women had "minds more open to new events and opportunities", whereas "old carcasses with very rare exceptions always constitute and obstacle".

She was one of the highest placed top women of the Fascist Party. She was seen as a role model of a Fascist Ideal woman, and described as a ‘Shining Example of Fascist Womanhood’.

She was ousted from her position as President of the Fasci Femminili when her supporter Augusto Turati was ousted in 1930. In 1930, the post she had occupied was abolished and there was no national leader of the Fascist women, until the national oversight committee was established in 1937, with Clara Franceschini and Giuditta Stelluti Scala Frascara appointed as inspectresses, followed in 1938 by an additional four: Wanda Bruschi Gorjux, Laura Marani Argnani, Teresita Menzinger Ruata and Olga Medici del Vascello. Angiola Moretti returned to the leadership of the Fasci Femminili in 1940, when she was appointed Insprectress of the national oversight committee of the Fascist women's organizations, which was the new shared leadership of the Fasci Femminili.

She married Count Nestore Carosi-Martinozzi in 1938.
