= Piccole Italiane =

Youth organization of the National Fascist Party for girls

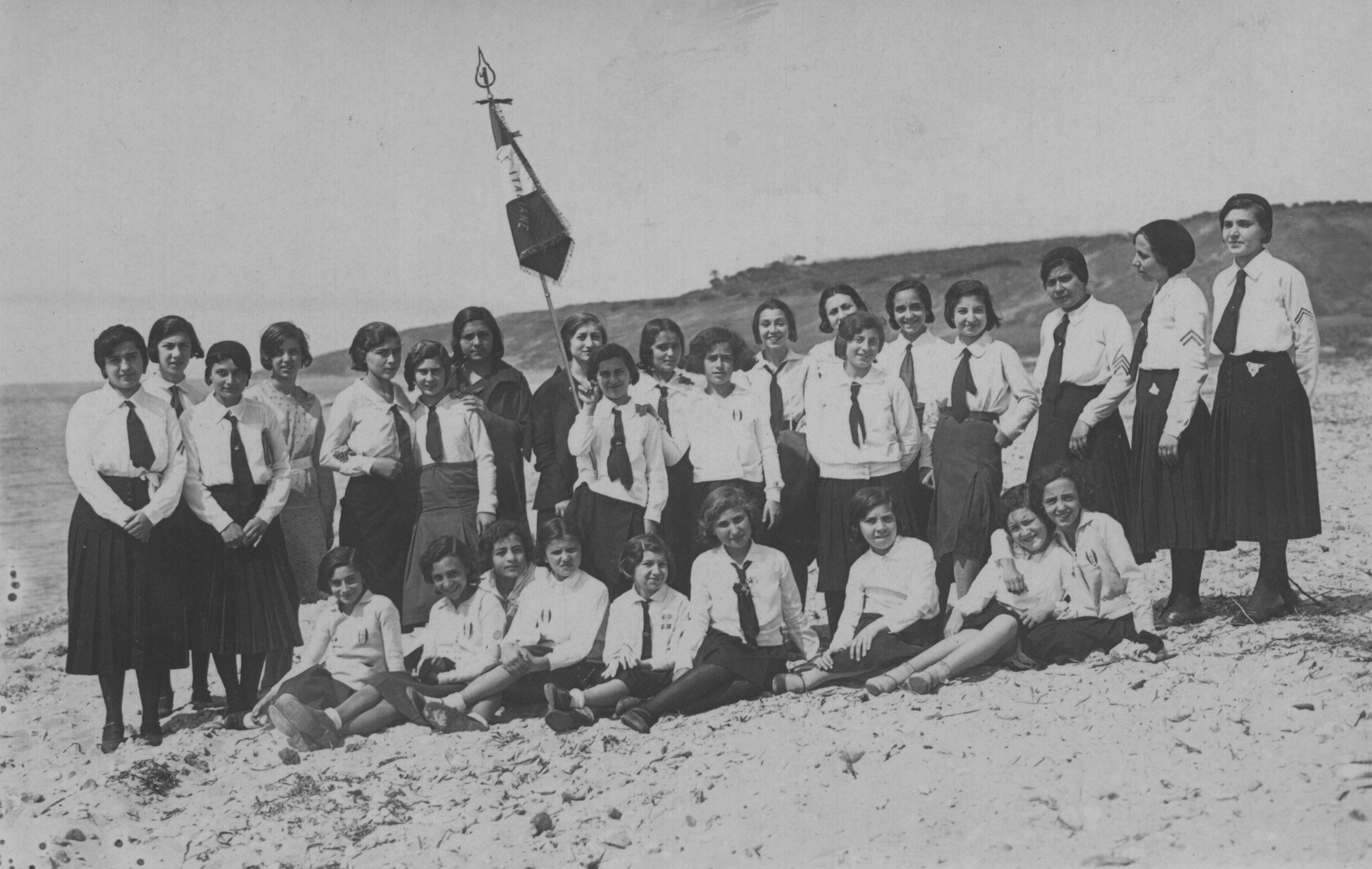
A Piccole Italiane group

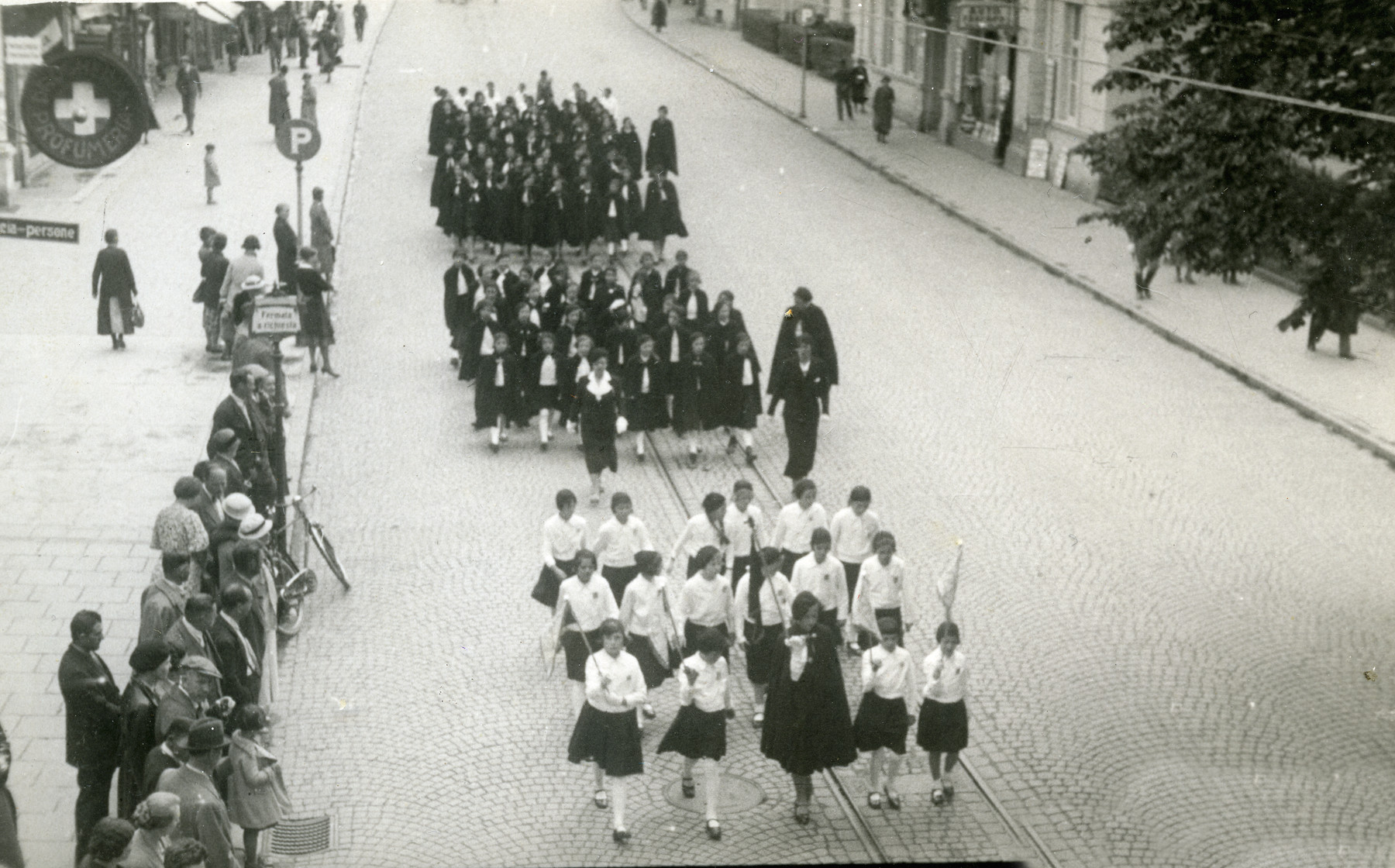
Giovani Italiane in Merano

Piccole Italiane (Italian: Little Italians) and Giovani Italiane (Italian: Young Italians) were party organizations of the Italian National Fascist Party (PNF) for young girls. It was the equivalent of the Balilla and Avanguardista for boys, respectively. The combined membership of Piccole and Giovani in 1931-1932 was over 740 thousand, three times more than the competing Unione Femminile Cattolica Italiana.

The National Fascist Party had a number of party organizations for citizens of different sexes, ages and professions, in order to control and indoctrinate the citizens.

Girls were first enrolled in the Piccole Italiane and the Giovani Italiane for girls between the age of 8 and 14; the progressed to the Giovani Italiane for girls aged 14–18; after which they became member of the Giovane fascista, which was a party organization for both men and women aged 18 to 21. Then, women were finally transferred to the women's organization Fasci Femminili (FF) for women over the age of 21, which was in turn divided in to several different organizations. All these organizations were technically under the command of the FF.

The girls of these parties wore a uniform consisting of a long black skirt, a black baretta, and a white blouse decorated with the fascist sign and a grade mark on the shoulder of the sleeve.

== See also ==
- Jungmädelbund
- League of German Girls
- Opera Nazionale Balilla

== Sources ==
- Marone, Francesca (2012). "Piccole italiane'. L'educazione delle bambine nel ventennio fascista". In Corsi, M.; Ulivieri, S. (eds.). Progetto Generazioni. Bambini e Anziani: due stagioni della vita a confronto (in Italian). Pisa: ETS. pp. 315–334.
- Gori, Gigliola (2004). "Le colonie alpine e marine per le Piccole italiane: salute, ginnastica e indottrinamento politico negli anni del fascismo". Geschichte und Region / Storia e Regione (in Italian). 13 (1): 141–168. ISSN 1121-0303.
