= Wanda Bruschi Gorjux =

Italian fascist politician (1889–1976)

Wanda Bruschi Gorjux (1889–1976) was an Italian politician of the National Fascist Party (PNF).

== Biography ==
Bruschi married Raffaele Gorjux in 1911. She was a journalist and a cultural organizer. She contributed to several women's magazines under pseudonyms (Medusa, Madame Récamier).

In 1930, the national leadership of the Fascist women's organization, the Fasci Femminili, was left vacant after Angiola Moretti. There were only leaders of the local branches until the national oversight committee was established in 1937, in which Clara Franceschini and Giuditta Stelluti Scala Frascara were appointed as inspectors by Achille Starace in a shared leadership position, followed in 1938 by an additional four: Wanda Bruschi Gorjux, Laura Marani Argnani, Teresita Menzinger Ruata and Olga Medici del Vascello. To be a member of the Fasci Femminili, or the women's groups under its umbrella, was the only way for a woman to be a part of the Fascist Party, which otherwise excluded women from all formal positions within the party.
