= Elvina Pallavicini =

Italian noblewoman

- Principessa Pallavicini
- Born: Elvina dei Medici del Vascello; 22 January 1914; Genoa, Italy
- Died: 29 August 2004 (aged 90); Cortina d'Ampezzo, Italy
- Spouse: Guglielmo Marius Hubert Marie de Pierre de Bernis de Courtavel
- Issue: Maria Camilla
- House: Pallavicini
- Father: Giacomo dei Marchesi Medici del Vascello
- Mother: Olga Leumann

Princess Elvina Pallavicini (22 January 1914 – 29 August 2004) was an Italian noblewoman, member of the Pallavicini family, and part of and often considered the leader of, the black nobility in Rome during the second half of the 20th century.

== Early life ==
She was born in Genoa on 22 January 1914 as Elvina dei Medici del Vascello, daughter of Giacomo dei Marchesi Medici del Vascello (1883–1949) and his wife, née Olga Leumann (d. 1966).

== Later life ==
During the Nazi occupation of Rome after the armistice between Italy and Allied armed forces, Pallavicini supported Italian royalist partisans and was later awarded the Bronze Medal of Military Valor for doing so.

Starting from 1977, Princess Elvina Pallavicini led a group of black nobility that provided support for Archbishop Marcel Lefebvre. She was also actively involved in politics, in particular, supporting the policies of the US Vice President Dick Cheney and Secretary of Defense Donald Rumsfeld.

Pallavicini, sometimes called the black queen or the first lady of Roman nobility, died on 29 August 2004 at Cortina d'Ampezzo. Her funeral in the basilica of San Lorenzo in Lucina was attended by numerous representatives of the Italian government and nobility.

== Marriage and family ==
In 1939, she married Guglielmo Marius Hubert Marie de Pierre de Bernis de Courtavel, who in 1937 was made Prince Pallavicini. The Prince was a military pilot in the Regia Aeronautica and became missing in action on 1 August 1940 after an air fight over the Mediterranean (he was officially declared dead by an Italian court ten years later, in 1950).

The spouses' only daughter, Maria Camilla, was born after his death. Maria Camilla married, and later divorced, the grandson of Armando Diaz della Vittoria.
