= Antonietta De Pace =

Italian patriot, educator, and military nurse

Antonietta de Pace (born 2 February 1818 in Gallipolli – 4 April 1893 in Capodimonte) was an Italian patriot, educator, and military nurse. She was one of the prominent figures in the fight for Italy's freedom and unity. She was one of the founders of the Female Political Committee of Napoli.

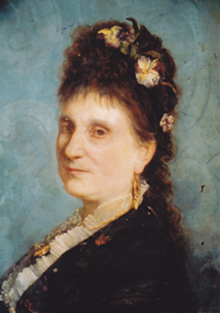
Antonietta De Pace (1818–1893) portrait at Gallipoli museum

== Biography ==
De Pace was born in Gallipoli, in February 1818. She was the daughter of wealthy Neapolitan banker Gregorio de Pace and Luisa Rocci Cerasoli.

When De Pace was eight years old, her father died and she and her three sisters Chiara, Carlotta and Rosa, were placed under the care of a monastery. Rosa married shortly afterwards and took Antonietta to live with her and her husband Epaminonda Valentino. When Valentino died in 1838, Rosa, Antonietta and Rosa's children moved to Naples in southern Italy.

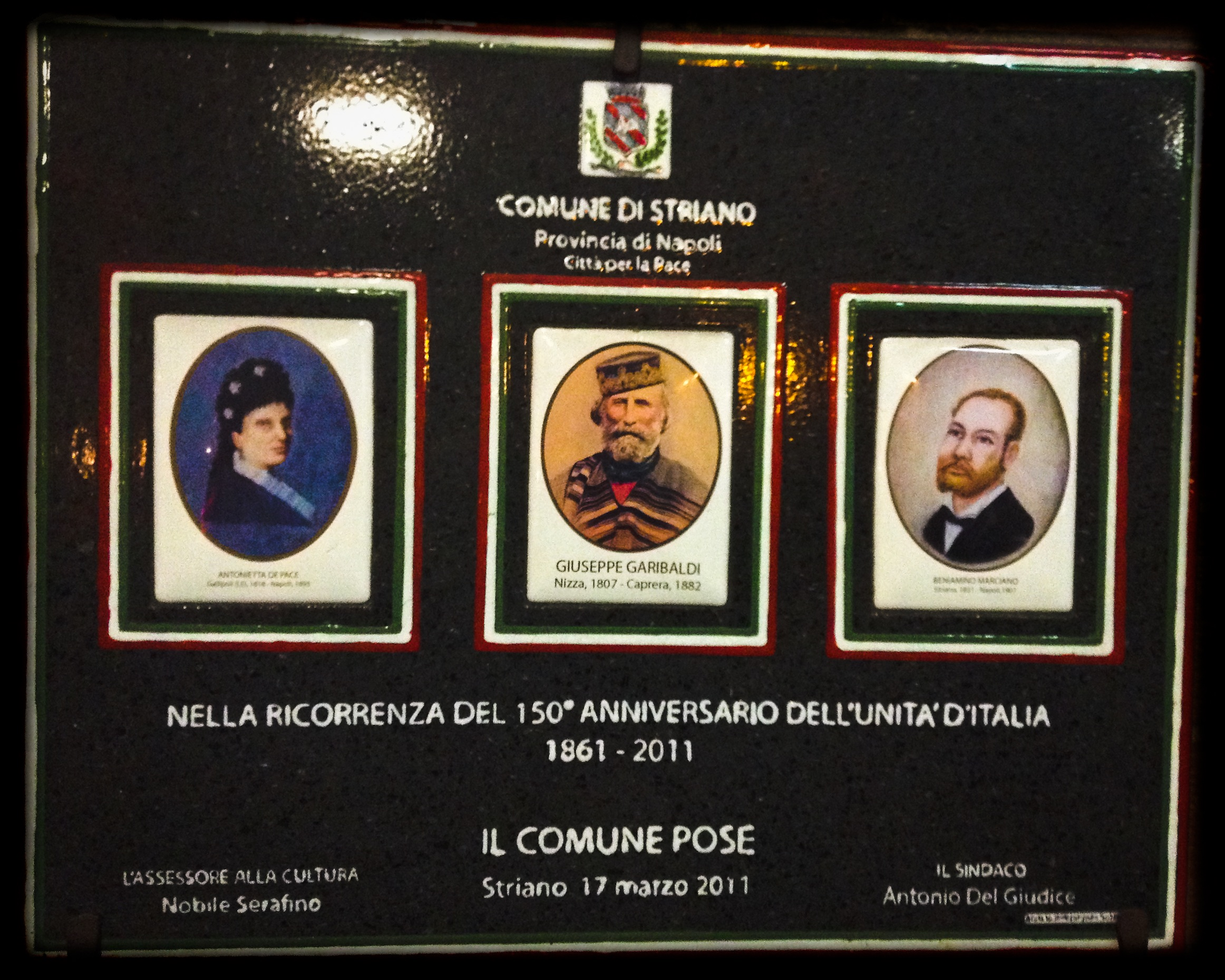
Commemorative plaque for the anniversary of the Unification of Italy for De Pace and other advocates for Italian unification

Antonietta De Pace became a prominent figure among the women patriots in Naples during the pre-parliamentary period. She devoted her life to civil service and Italian unification, and later on to improving the social and cultural position of women in the country.

== See also ==
- Women in Italy
