= Giacomo Medici Del Vascello =

Italian Fascist politician (1883–1949)

Giacomo Medici del Vascello
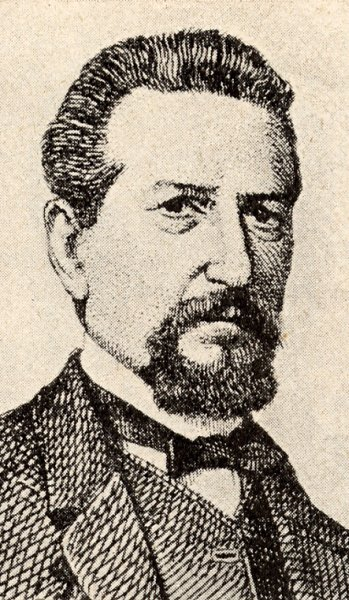
- Portrait, c. 1920s

Undersecretary to the Presidency of the Council of Ministers of the Kingdom of Italy
- In office 24 January 1935 – 30 October 1939
- Preceded by: Edmondo Rossoni
- Succeeded by: Luigi Russo

Member of the Chamber of Deputies of the Kingdom of Italy
- In office 20 April 1929 – 2 March 1939

Member of the Chamber of Fasces and Corporations
- In office 23 March 1939 – 5 August 1943

Personal details
- Born: 1 April 1883 Salerno, Kingdom of Italy
- Died: 15 August 1949 (aged 66) Venaria Reale, Italy
- Party: National Fascist Party
- Awards: Order of St. Gregory the Great; Sovereign Military Order of Malta

Giacomo Medici, marquess of Vascello (Salerno, 1 April 1883 – Venaria Reale, 15 August 1949) was an Italian fascist politician who served as Undersecretary to the Presidency of the Council of the Kingdom of Italy from 1935 to 1939. He was the grandson of Risorgimento general Giacomo Medici.

== Biography ==
Holder of a degree in engineering, he owned industrial and agricultural businesses. He had two children, Luigi Francesco and Elvina.

In 1929 and again in 1934 he was elected to the Italian Chamber of Deputies, serving as undersecretary to the presidency of the council of the Mussolini Cabinet from 1935 to 1939. He held the rank of console generale (brigadier general) of the Volunteer Militia for National Security. In 1939 he became a member of the Chamber of Fasces and Corporations.

He was married to Olga Medici del Vascello.
