= Elisa Majer Rizzioli =

Italian fascist politician (1880–1930)

- Born: November 27, 1880; Venice, Italy
- Died: June 2, 1930 (aged 49)
- Organization(s): Fasci Femminili (President), Red Cross (Voluntary War Nurse)
- Political party: National Fascist Party
- Spouse: Niccolo Rizzioli
- Parents: Angelo Majer; Maria Marin

Elisa Majer Rizzioli (1880 – 1930), was an Italian fascist politician who served as President of Fasci Femminili (FF), the women's wing of Italy's National Fascist Party (PNF) from 1919 to 1926. During World War I, she served as a volunteer Red Cross nurse in Libya.

== Career ==
During World War I, Majer Rizzioli served as a volunteer Red Cross nurse in Libya.

Majer Rizzioli served as the President (officially of the Fascist state women's organization, the Fasci Femminili (FF), between 1919 and 1926.

During her presidency, in 1925, she founded and financed the magazine of the FF, Women's Italian Review, Rome (Italian: Rassegna femminile italiana). The magazine's staff was almost exclusively female and, because of this "self-management", it was described as a "striking contrast to the image of female identity manufactured by the regime" by historian Robert Pickering-Iazzi. She continued as its editor after her removal from the presidency but, following her death, the magazine ceased publication.

Majer Rizzioli fought for fascist women and the FF to be autonomous. In the first years of Italian fascism, the position of women was unclear. Mussolini, dictator of Italy from 1922 to 1943 as leader of the National Fascist Party, promised Rizzioli that women's suffrage would be introduced. He introduced municipal suffrage for women in 1925 but he later abolished free elections in Italy in 1926.

Her demands for female autonomy in the Italian fascist movement were defeated in 1924 and, ultimately, women were eliminated from true influence in the PNF. In 1926, Majer Rizzioli was removed from her post by Roberto Farinacci (Secretary of the PNF), and replaced by Angiola Moretti, who led the FF until 1930.

== Personal life ==
Belonging to a wealthy family, Majer Rizzioli was born in Venice to Angelo Majer, a rich Jewish merchant, and Maria Marin, a noblewoman. In 1904, she married the public notary Niccolo Rizzioli.
