= Massaie Rurali =

Italian organisation for peasant women

Massaie Rurali (MR; "Rural Farm-Women") was an Italian organisation for peasant women within the Italian Fascist Party (PNF). MR was founded in 1933 and disbanded in 1945. It was the largest women's organisation in Fascist Italy and one of the largest organisations, with more than three million members in 1943.

The MR was a section of the Fasci Femminili (FF) or "Women's Leagues", the women's organization of the National Fascist Party. It was one of two new women's sections founded in the 1930s, the other being the Sezione Operaie e Lavoranti a Domicilio (Section for Female Laborers and Home-workers or SOLD), both of whom where founded to include working class women in to the Fascist Party, where previously only girls and middle class women had been active.

Its purpose was to instruct peasant women, who were idealized as the mothers of the nation by the party, in their role according to fascist ideology. MR became the biggest women's organization in Fascist Italy, although not the most influential.
