= Olga Bjoner =

Norwegian politician and journalist (1887–1969)

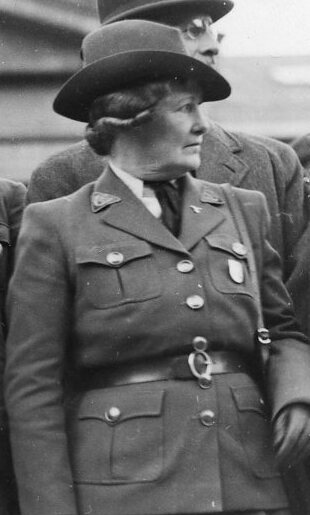
- Bjoner in 1942
- Born: 10 December 1887; Askim, Norway
- Died: 25 June 1969 (aged 81)
- Occupations: Journalist, organisational leader, politician
- Organization: Norges Bondekvinnelag
- Political party: Nasjonal Samling

Olga Bjoner (10 December 1887 – 25 June 1969) was a Norwegian journalist, organizational leader and Nazi politician. She was born in Askim.

She chaired Norges Bondekvinnelag in the 1920s and 1930s. During the occupation of Norway by Nazi Germany she chaired Nasjonal Samling's organization for women. After the war, Bjoner was sentenced to six years in prison for treason. She was released from prison in 1948.
