= Sezione Operaie e Lavoranti a Domicilio =

Italian organisation (1937–1945)

Sezione Operaie e Lavoranti a Domicilio (SOLD) ('Section for Female Laborers and Home-workers') was an Italian organisation for urban working-class women within the Italian Fascist Party (PNF). SOLD was founded in 1937 and disbanded in 1945.

It was one of two new women's sections of the National Fascist Party founded in the 1930s, the other being the Massaie Rurali (MR), both of whom where founded to include working-class women in to the Fascist Party, where previously only girls and middle-class women had been active.

Its purpose was to instruct working women in their role according to fascist ideology.
