= Fascism and ideology =

History of fascist ideology

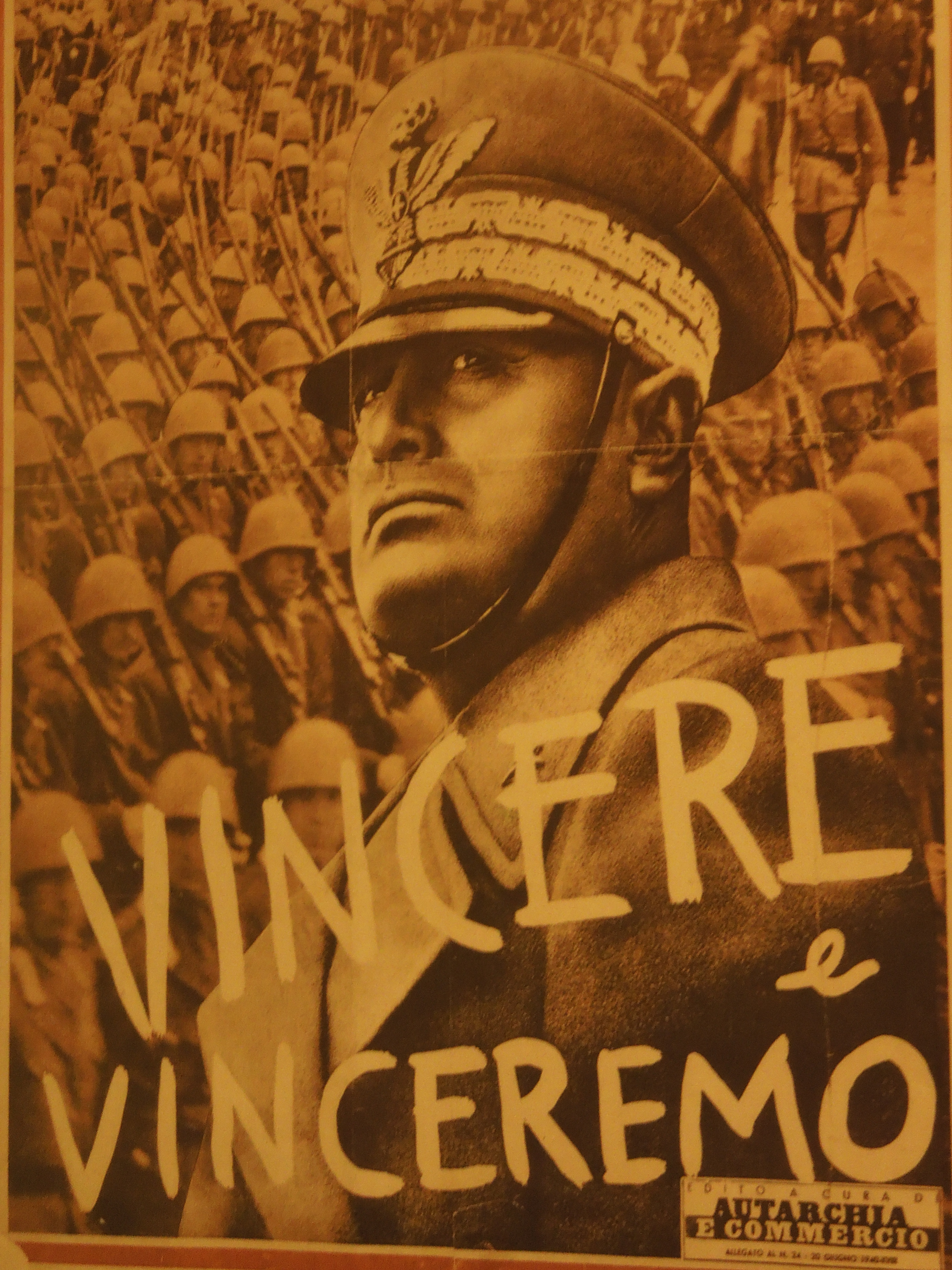
A Fascist propaganda poster featuring Benito Mussolini, the Duce of Italy, with the text "Win! And we will win."

The history of fascist ideology is long and draws on many sources. Some fascists took inspiration from sources as ancient as the Spartans for their focus on racial purity and their emphasis on rule by an elite minority. Researchers have also seen links between fascism and the ideals of Plato, though there are key differences between the two. Italian Fascism styled itself as the ideological successor to Ancient Rome, particularly the Roman Empire. Georg Wilhelm Friedrich Hegel's view on the absolute authority of the state also strongly influenced fascist thinking. The 1789 French Revolution was a major influence insofar as the Nazis saw themselves as fighting back against many of the ideas which it brought to prominence, especially liberalism, liberal democracy and racial equality, whereas on the other hand, fascism drew heavily on the revolutionary ideal of nationalism. The prejudice of a "high and noble" Aryan culture as opposed to a "parasitic" Semitic culture was core to Nazi racial views, while other early forms of fascism concerned themselves with non-racialized conceptions of their respective nations.

Common themes among fascist movements include: authoritarianism, nationalism, hierarchy, elitism, and militarism. Other aspects of fascism – such as a perception of decadence, anti-egalitarianism and totalitarianism – can be seen to originate from these ideas. Roger Griffin has proposed that fascism is a synthesis of totalitarianism and ultranationalism sacralized through a myth of national rebirth and regeneration, which he terms "palingenetic ultranationalism".

Fascism had a complex relationship with other ideologies that were contemporary with it. Fascism frequently considered those ideologies its adversaries, but at the same time it was also focused on co-opting their more popular aspects. Fascism supported private property – except for the groups which it persecuted – and the profit motive of capitalism, but it sought to eliminate the autonomy of large-scale capitalism from the state. Fascists shared many of the goals of the conservatives of their day and they often allied themselves with them by drawing recruits from disaffected conservative ranks, but they presented themselves as holding a more modern ideology – with less focus on things like traditional religion – and sought to radically reshape society through revolutionary action rather than preserving the status quo. Fascism opposed class conflict and the egalitarian and international character of socialism. It strongly opposed liberalism, communism, anarchism, and democratic socialism.

== Ideological origins ==
Fascism was influenced by historical models that were seen as promoting militarism and racial purity, such as Sparta in ancient Greece, and by those seen as promoting imperialism, such as ancient Rome and particularly the Roman Empire. Italian fascism drew upon the ideas of Niccolò Machiavelli to justify the need for a dictator with absolute power. Some of the 18th century theories of Johann Gottfried Herder, particularly his ideas of nationalism and his concept of an Aryan race with a superior Aryan culture, were also integrated into fascist ideology. Fascists opposed the legacy of the French Revolution, especially its ideas of social equality, liberal democracy, anticlericalism and rationalism, but they appreciated the role of the revolution in the creation of nationalist movements, particularly German nationalism. Authoritarian leaders from the 19th century, such as Napoleon III and Otto von Bismarck, also served as inspiration to 20th century fascists.

The ideological roots of fascism have been traced to the 1880s and in particular to the fin de siècle theme of that time. The fin-de-siècle generation supported emotionalism, irrationalism, subjectivism and vitalism, seeing civilization as being in a crisis that required a massive and total solution. This outlook was influenced by various intellectual developments, including Darwinian biology; Wagnerian aesthetics; Arthur de Gobineau's racialism; Gustave Le Bon's psychology; and the philosophies of Friedrich Nietzsche, Fyodor Dostoyevsky and Henri Bergson. Social Darwinism, which gained widespread acceptance, made no distinction between physical and social life and viewed the human condition as being an unceasing struggle to achieve the survival of the fittest. Friedrich Nietzsche's concept of the Übermensch and his advocacy of the will to power as a primordial instinct were major influences upon many of the fin-de-siècle generation. Proponents of decadence-theories claimed that contemporary society was decadent because it allowed the survival of the least fit and because of its cultural emphasis on egalitarianism and nonconformity. This helped the cause of nationalists who presented nationalism as a cure for decadence.

In 1896, Gaetano Mosca developed the theory that in all societies, an "organized minority" will dominate and rule over the "disorganized majority." Mosca claimed that the structure of the military is the ideal model for society, because it balances out diverse social elements and because it contains an officer class as a "power élite". In 1911, Robert Michels published his theory of an iron law of oligarchy, which was a major attack on the basis of democracy. Michels argued that it is impossible for democracy to eliminate élite rule, that democracy is a façade which legitimizes the rule of a particular élite, and that élite rule (which he calls oligarchy) is inevitable and beneficial.

Fascism also drew inspiration from the ideas of Georges Sorel (1847–1922), who promoted the legitimacy of political violence and emphasized the need for a revolutionary political religion. Sorel began his career as a syndicalist, but after 1909 he and his supporters shifted to the radical right, seeking to merge militant Catholicism and French patriotism with their views. Sorel became a supporter of the reactionary integral nationalism of Charles Maurras (1868–1952), who was a French right-wing monarchist and nationalist. The fusion of Maurrassianism and Sorelianism influenced the right-wing Italian Nationalist Association (ANI), who denounced Italy's political corruption, liberalism, and division caused by "ignoble socialism". The ANI had ties and influence among conservatives, Catholics, and the business community. The ANI claimed that liberal democracy was no longer compatible with the modern world and it advocated a strong state and imperialism, claiming that humans are naturally predatory and that nations were in a constant life and death struggle, in which only the strongest nations would survive.

The word "fascism" was coined during World War I by Benito Mussolini and his supporters, who advocated for an Italian war of conquest to "secure Italy's natural frontiers of language and race". Italy joined the war in 1915, and its use of elite shock troops known as the Arditi was an important influence on the early Fascist movement.

The October Revolution in Russia in 1917 gave rise to a fear of communism among the elites as well as among society at large in several European countries, and fascist movements gained support by presenting themselves as a radical anti-communist political force. Anti-communism was also an expression of fascist anti-universalism, because communism insisted on international working class unity while fascism insisted on national interests. After World War I, fascists have commonly campaigned on anti-Marxist agendas.

In Italy during the post-war years, the fascist movement tried to become a broad political umbrella that could include people of all classes and political positions, united only by a desire to save Italy from the Marxist threat and to ensure the expansion of Italian territories in the post-war peace settlements. Mussolini tried to build his popular support especially among war veterans and patriots by enthusiastically supporting Gabriele D'Annunzio, who demanded the annexation of large territories and led an occupation of Fiume in 1919–1920.

In 1920, militant strike activity by industrial workers reached its peak in Italy, where 1919 and 1920 were known as the "Red Years". Mussolini and his movement received large donations from big business and landowners, who were concerned about working class unrest and eager to support any political force that stood against it. Together with many smaller donations that he received from the public as part of a fund drive to support D'Annunzio, this helped to build up the Fascist movement and transform it from a small group based around Milan to a national political force. Mussolini organized his own militia, known as the "blackshirts," which started a campaign of violence against Communists, Socialists, trade unions and co-operatives under the pretense of "saving the country from bolshevism" and preserving order and internal peace in Italy.

Fascists identified their primary opponents as the socialists who had opposed intervention in World War I. The Fascists and the rest of the Italian political right held common ground: both opposed Marxism, discounted class consciousness and believed in the rule of elites. The Fascists assisted the anti-socialist campaign by allying with the other parties and the conservative right in a mutual effort to destroy the Italian Socialist Party and labour organizations committed to class identity above national identity.

In 1921, the Fascists joined the National Bloc, a coalition of conservatives, nationalists and liberals, which stood against the left-wing parties (the socialists and the communists) in the Italian general election. As part of this alliance, the Fascists identified themselves for the first time as the "extreme right", and presented themselves as the most radical right-wing members of the coalition. Mussolini talked about "imperialism" and "national expansion" as his main goals, and called for Italian domination of the Mediterranean Sea basin. He also used his first speech in parliament to take a "reactionary" stance, arguing against collectivization and nationalization, and calling for the post office and the railways to be given to private enterprise.

Beginning in 1922, Fascist paramilitaries escalated their strategy by switching from attacks on socialist offices and the homes of socialist leadership figures to the violent occupation of cities. The Fascists met little serious resistance from authorities and proceeded to take over several cities. They attacked the headquarters of socialist and Catholic unions in Cremona and imposed forced Italianization upon the German-speaking population of Trent and Bolzano, then they made plans to take Rome.

On 24 October 1922, the National Fascist Party held its annual congress, where Mussolini ordered Blackshirts to take control of public buildings and trains and to converge on three points around Rome. The Italian government initially took action to prevent the Fascists from entering Rome, but King Victor Emmanuel III perceived the risk of bloodshed in Rome to be too high if the Fascists were to be confronted by force. The king decided to appoint Mussolini as Prime Minister of Italy and Mussolini arrived in Rome on 30 October to accept the appointment. Fascist propaganda aggrandized this event, called the "March on Rome", as a "seizure" of power due to Fascists' heroic exploits.

== Fascism's relationship with other philosophies, ideologies, and systems ==
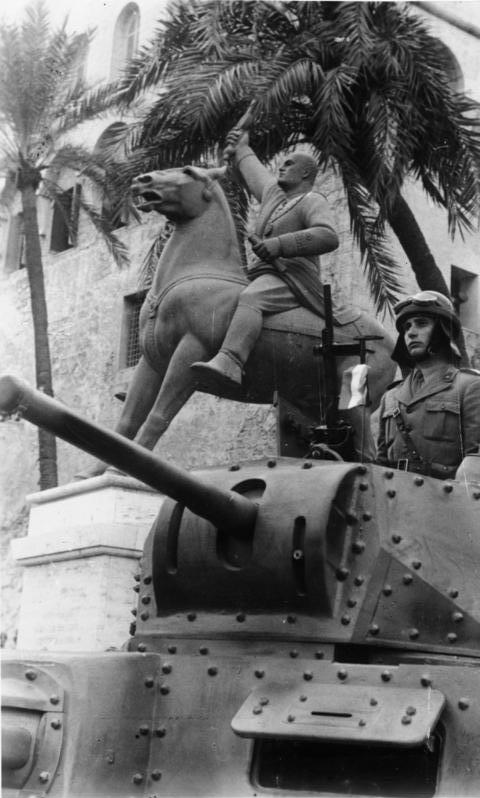
Parade of Italian forces alongside an equestrian statue of Mussolini during the North African campaign in Tripoli, Italian-occupied Libya (Bundesarchiv Bild, March 1941)

Mussolini saw fascism as opposing socialism and other left-wing ideologies, writing in The Doctrine of Fascism: "If it is admitted that the nineteenth century has been the century of Socialism, Liberalism and Democracy, it does not follow that the twentieth must also be the century of Liberalism, Socialism and Democracy. Political doctrines pass; peoples remain. It is to be expected that this century may be that of authority, a century of the 'Right,' a Fascist century."

=== Capitalism ===
Fascism had a complex relationship with capitalism, both supporting and opposing different aspects of it at different times and in different countries. In general, fascists held an instrumental view of capitalism, regarding it as a tool that may be useful or not, depending on circumstances. Fascists aimed to promote what they considered the national interests of their countries; they supported the right to own private property and the profit motive because they believed that they were beneficial to the economic development of a nation, but they commonly sought to eliminate the autonomy of large-scale business interests from the state.

There were both pro-capitalist and anti-capitalist elements in fascist thought. Fascist opposition to capitalism was based on the perceived decadence, hedonism, and cosmopolitanism of the wealthy, in contrast to the idealized discipline, patriotism and moral virtue of the members of the middle classes. Fascist support for capitalism was based on the idea that economic competition was good for the nation, as well as social Darwinist beliefs that the economic success of the wealthy proved their superiority and the idea that interfering with natural selection in the economy would burden the nation by preserving weak individuals. These two ways of thinking about capitalism – viewing it as a positive force which promotes economic efficiency and is necessary for the prosperity of the nation but also viewing it as a negative force which promotes decadence and disloyalty to the nation – remained in uneasy coexistence within most fascist movements. The economic policies of fascist governments, meanwhile, were generally not based on ideological commitments one way or the other, instead being dictated by pragmatic concerns with building a strong national economy, promoting autarky, and the need to prepare for and to wage war.

==== In Italian Fascism ====
The earliest version of a fascist movement, which consisted of the small political groups led by Benito Mussolini in the Kingdom of Italy from 1914 to 1922 (Fascio d'Azione Rivoluzionaria and Fasci Italiani di Combattimento, respectively), formed a radical pro-war interventionist movement which focused on Italian territorial expansion and aimed to unite people from across the political spectrum in service to this goal. As such, this movement did not take a clear stance either for or against capitalism, as that would have divided its supporters. Many of its leaders, including Mussolini himself, had come from the anti-capitalist revolutionary syndicalist tradition, and were known for their anti-capitalist rhetoric. However, a significant part of the movement's funding came from pro-war business interests and major landowners. Mussolini at this stage tried to maintain a balance, by still claiming to be a social revolutionary while also cultivating a "positive attitude" towards capitalism and capitalists. The small fascist movement that was led by Mussolini in Milan in 1919 bore almost no resemblance with the Italian Fascism of ten years later, as it put forward an ambitious anti-capitalist program calling for redistributing land to the peasants, a progressive tax on capital, greater inheritance taxes and the confiscation of excessive war profits, while also proclaiming its opposition to "any kind of dictatorship or arbitrary power" and demanding an independent judiciary, universal suffrage, and complete freedom of speech. Yet Mussolini at the same time promised to eliminate state intervention in business and to transfer large segments of the economy from public to private control, and the fascists met in a hall provided by Milanese businessmen. These contradictions were regarded by Mussolini as a virtue of the fascist movement, which, at this early stage, intended to appeal to everyone.

Starting in 1921, Italian Fascism shifted from presenting itself as a broad-based expansionist movement, to claiming to represent the extreme right of Italian politics. This was accompanied by a shift in its attitude towards capitalism. Whereas in the beginning it had accommodated both anti-capitalist and pro-capitalist stances, it now took on a strongly pro-free-enterprise policy. After being elected to the Italian parliament for the first time, the Fascists took a stand against economic collectivization and nationalization, and advocated for the privatization of postal and railway services. Mussolini appealed to conservative liberals to support a future fascist seizure of power by arguing that "capitalism would flourish best if Italy discarded democracy and accepted dictatorship as necessary in order to crush socialism and make government effective." He also promised that the fascists would reduce taxes and balance the budget, repudiated his socialist past and affirmed his faith in economic liberalism.

In 1922, following the March on Rome, the National Fascist Party came to power and Mussolini became prime minister of Italy. From that time until the advent of the Great Depression in 1929, the Italian Fascists pursued a generally free-market and pro-capitalist economic policy, in collaboration with traditional Italian business elites. Near the beginning of his tenure as prime minister, in 1923, Mussolini declared that "the [Fascist] government will accord full freedom to private enterprise and will abandon all intervention in private economy." Mussolini's government privatized former government monopolies (such as the telephone system), repealed previous legislation that had been introduced by the Socialists (such as the inheritance tax), and balanced the budget. Alfredo Rocco, the Fascist Minister of Justice at the time, wrote in 1926 that:

Fascism maintains that in the ordinary run of events economic liberty serves the social purposes best; that it is profitable to entrust to individual initiative the task of economic development both as to production and as to distribution; that in the economic world individual ambition is the most effective means for obtaining the best social results with the least effort.

Mussolini attracted the wealthy in the 1920s by praising free enterprise, by talking about reducing the bureaucracy and abolishing unemployment relief, and by supporting increased inequality in society. He advocated economic liberalization, asserted that the state should keep out of the economy and even said that government intervention in general was "absolutely ruinous to the development of the economy." At the same time, however, he also tried to maintain some of fascism's early appeal to people of all classes by insisting that he was not against the workers, and sometimes by outright contradicting himself and saying different things to different audiences. Many of the wealthy Italian industrialists and landlords backed Mussolini because he provided stability (especially compared to the Giolitti era), and because under Mussolini's government there were "few strikes, plenty of tax concessions for the well-to-do, an end to rent controls and generally high profits for business."

The Italian Fascist outlook towards capitalism changed after 1929, with the onset of the Great Depression which dealt a heavy blow to the Italian economy. Prices fell, production slowed, and unemployment more than tripled in the first four years of the Depression. In response, the Fascist government abandoned economic liberalism and turned to state intervention in the economy. Mussolini developed a theory which held that capitalism had degenerated over time, and that the capitalism of his era was facing a crisis because it had departed too far from its original roots. According to Mussolini, the original form was heroic capitalism or dynamic capitalism (1830–1870), which gave way to static capitalism (1870–1914), which then transformed into decadent capitalism or "supercapitalism", starting in 1914. Mussolini denounced this supercapitalism as a failure due to its alleged decadence, support for unlimited consumerism and intention to create the "standardization of humankind". He claimed that supercapitalism had resulted in the collapse of the capitalist system in the Great Depression, but that the industrial developments of earlier types of capitalism were valuable and that private property should be supported as long as it was productive. Fascists also argued that, without intervention, supercapitalism "would ultimately decay and open the way for a Marxist revolution as labour-capital relations broke down". They presented their new economic program as a way to avoid this result.

The idea of corporatism, which had already been part of Fascist rhetoric for some time, rose to prominence as a solution that would preserve private enterprise and property while allowing the state to intervene in the economy when private enterprise failed. Corporatism was promoted as reconciling the interests of capital and labour. Mussolini argued that this fascist corporatism would preserve those elements of capitalism that were deemed beneficial, such as private enterprise, and combine them with state supervision. At this time he also said that he rejected the typical capitalist elements of economic individualism and laissez-faire. Mussolini claimed that in supercapitalism "a capitalist enterprise, when difficulties arise, throws itself like a dead weight into the state's arms. It is then that state intervention begins and becomes more necessary. It is then that those who once ignored the state now seek it out anxiously". Due to the inability of businesses to operate properly when facing economic difficulties, Mussolini claimed that this proved that state intervention into the economy was necessary to stabilize the economy.

Statements from Italian Fascist leaders in the 1930s tended to be critical of economic liberalism and laissez-faire, while promoting corporatism as the basis for a new economic model. Mussolini said in an interview in October 1933 that he "want[ed] to establish the corporative regime," and in a speech on 14 November 1933 he declared:

To-day we can affirm that the capitalistic method of production is out of date. So is the doctrine of laissez-faire, the theoretical basis of capitalism... To-day we are taking a new and decisive step in the path of revolution. A revolution, to be great, must be a social revolution.

A year later, in 1934, Italian Agriculture Minister Giacomo Acerbo claimed that Fascist corporatism was the best way to defend private property in the context of the Great Depression:

While nearly everywhere else private property was bearing the major burdens and suffering from the hardest blows of the depression, in Italy, thanks to the actions of this Fascist government, private property not only has been saved, but has also been strengthened.

In the late 1930s, Fascist Italy tried to achieve autarky (national economic self-sufficiency), and for this purpose the government promoted manufacturing cartels and introduced significant tariff barriers, currency restrictions and regulations of the economy to attempt to balance payments with Italy's trade partners. The attempt to achieve effective economic autonomy was not successful, but minimizing international trade remained an official goal of Italian Fascism.

==== In German Nazism ====
German Nazism, like Italian Fascism, also incorporated both pro-capitalist and anti-capitalist views. The main difference was that Nazism interpreted everything through a racial lens. Thus, Nazi views on capitalism were shaped by the question of which race the capitalists belonged to. Jewish capitalists (especially bankers) were considered to be mortal enemies of Germany and part of a global conspiracy that also included Jewish communists. On the other hand, ethnic German capitalists were regarded as potential allies by the Nazis.

From the beginning of the Nazi movement, and especially from the late 1920s onward, the Nazi Party took the stance that it was not opposed to private property or capitalism as such, but only to its excesses and the domination of the German economy by "foreign" capitalists (including German Jews). There were a range of economic views within the early Nazi Party, ranging from the Strasserite wing which championed extensive state intervention, to the Völkisch conservatives who promoted a program of conservative corporatism, to the economic right-wing within Nazism, who hoped to avoid corporatism because it was viewed as too restrictive for big business. In the end, the approach that prevailed after the Nazis came to power was a pragmatic one, in which there would be no new economic system, but rather a continuation of "the long German tradition of authoritarian statist economics, which dated well back into the nineteenth century."

Like Fascist Italy, Nazi Germany similarly pursued an economic agenda with the aims of autarky and rearmament and imposed protectionist policies, including forcing the German steel industry to use lower-quality German iron ore rather than superior-quality imported iron. The Nazis were economic nationalists who "favoured protective tariffs, foreign debt reduction, and import substitution to remove what they regarded as debilitating dependence on the world economy."

The purpose of the economy, according to the Nazi worldview, was to "provide the material springboard for military conquest." As such, the Nazis aimed to place the focus of the German economy on a drive for empire and conquest, and they found and promoted businessmen who were willing to cooperate with their goals. They opposed free-market economics and instead promoted a state-driven economy that would guarantee high profits to friendly private companies in exchange for their support, which was a model adopted by many other political movements and governments in the 1930s, including the governments of Britain and France. Private capitalism was not directly challenged, but it was subordinated to the military and foreign policy goals of the state, in a way that reduced the decision-making power of industrial managers but did not interfere with the pursuit of private profit. Leading German business interests supported the goals of the Nazi government and its war effort in exchange for advantageous contracts, subsidies, and the suppression of the trade union movement. Avraham Barkai concludes that, because "the individual firm still operated according to the principle of maximum profit," the Nazi German economy was therefore "a capitalist economy in which capitalists, like all other citizens, were not free even though they enjoyed a privileged status, had a limited measure of freedom in their activities, and were able to accumulate huge profits as long as they accepted the primacy of politics."

==== In other fascist movements ====
Other fascist movements mirrored the general outlook of the Italian Fascists and German Nazis. The Spanish Falange called for respect for private property and was founded with support from Spanish landowners and industrialists. However, the Falange distinguished between "private property", which it supported, and "capitalism", which it opposed. The Falangist program of 1937 recognized "private property as a legitimate means for achieving individual, family and social goals," but Falangist leader José Antonio Primo de Rivera said in 1935: "We reject the capitalist system, which disregards the needs of the people, dehumanizes private property and transforms the workers into shapeless masses prone to misery and despair." After his death and the rise of Francisco Franco, the rhetoric changed, and Falangist leader Raimundo Fernández-Cuesta declared the movement's ideology to be compatible with capitalism. In Hungary, the Arrow Cross Party held anti-feudal, anti-capitalist and anti-socialist beliefs, supporting land reform and militarism and drawing most of its support from the ranks of the army. The Romanian Iron Guard espoused anti-capitalist, anti-banking and anti-bourgeois rhetoric, combined with anti-communism and a religious form of antisemitism. The Iron Guard saw both capitalism and communism as being Jewish creations that served to divide the nation, and accused Jews of being "the enemies of the Christian nation."

==== Colonial fascism ====
The colonial fascism is a term used to describe various historical regimes in Haiti, such as the presidency of Louis Borno or the subsequent government of François Duvalier. There is significant controversy regarding which political movements and governments in Africa, if any, can be considered fascist. The American historian and political scientist Robert Paxton, a scholar on the subject of fascism, rejects the view that Idi Amin’s government in Uganda was fascist in nature.

The Coalition for the Defence of the Republic and the larger nascent Hutu Power movement, an ultranationalist and Hutu-supremacist movement that organized and carried out the Rwandan genocide with the aim of exterminating the Tutsi people of Rwanda, has been described as an example of “tropical fascism” in Africa. Other examples of colonial fascism are the Brazilian Integralist Action party, Egyptian militarism,and the Integralist movement in Brazil, one of the far-right movements that had the greatest impact in its place of origin.

=== Conservatism ===
In principle, there were significant differences between conservatives and fascists. However, both conservatives and fascists in Europe have held similar positions on many issues, including anti-communism and support of national pride. Conservatives and fascists both reject the liberal and Marxist emphasis on linear progressive evolution in history. Fascism's emphasis on order, discipline, hierarchy, military virtues and preservation of private property appealed to conservatives. The fascist promotion of "healthy", "uncontaminated" elements of national tradition such as chivalric culture and glorifying a nation's historical golden age has similarities with conservative aims. Fascists also made pragmatic tactical alliances with traditional conservative forces to achieve and maintain power. Even at the height of their influence and popularity, fascist movements were never able to seize power entirely by themselves, and relied on alliances with conservative parties to come to power. However, while conservatives made alliances with fascists in countries where the conservatives felt themselves under threat and therefore in need of such an alliance, this did not happen in places where the conservatives were securely in power. Several authoritarian conservative regimes across Europe suppressed fascist parties in the 1930s and 40s.

Many of fascism's recruits were disaffected right-wing conservatives who were dissatisfied with the traditional right's inability to achieve national unity and its inability to respond to socialism, feminism, economic crisis and international difficulties. With traditional conservative parties in Europe severely weakened in the aftermath of World War I, there was a political vacuum on the right which fascism filled. Fascists gathered support from landlords, business owners, army officers, and other conservative individuals and groups, by successfully presenting themselves as the last line of defense against land reform, social welfare measures, demilitarization, higher wages, and the socialization of the means of production. According to John Weiss, "Any study of fascism which centers too narrowly on the fascists and Nazis alone may miss the true significance of right-wing extremism."

However, unlike conservatism, fascism specifically presents itself as a modern ideology that is willing to break free from the moral and political constraints of traditional society. The conservative authoritarian right is distinguished from fascism in that such conservatives tended to use traditional religion as the basis for their philosophical views, while fascists based their views on vitalism, nonrationalism, or secular neo-idealism. Fascists often drew upon religious imagery, but used it as a symbol for the nation and replaced spirituality with secular nationalism. Even in the most religious of the fascist movements, the Romanian Iron Guard, "Christ was stripped of genuine otherworldly mystery and was reduced to a metaphor for national redemption." Fascists claimed to support the traditional religions of their countries, but did not regard religion as a source of important moral principles, seeing it only as an aspect of national culture and a source of national identity and pride. Furthermore, while conservatives in interwar Europe generally wished to return to the pre-1914 status quo, fascists did not. Fascism combined an idealization of the past with an enthusiasm for modern technology. Nazi Germany "celebrated Aryan values and the glories of the Germanic knights while also taking pride in its newly created motorway system." Fascists looked to the spirit of the past to inspire a new era of national greatness and set out to "forge a mythic link between the present generation and a glorious stage in the past", but they did not seek to directly copy or restore past societies.

Another difference with traditional conservatism lies in the fact that fascism had radical aspirations for reshaping society. Arthur M. Schlesinger Jr. wrote that "Fascists were not conservative in any very meaningful sense. ... The Fascists, in a meaningful sense, were revolutionaries". Fascists sought to destroy existing elites through revolutionary action to replace them with a new elite selected on the principle of the survival of the fittest, and thus they "rejected existing aristocracies in favor of their own new aristocracy." Yet at the same time, some fascist leaders claimed to be counter-revolutionary, and fascism saw itself as being opposed to all previous revolutions from the French Revolution onward, blaming them for liberalism, socialism, and decadence. In his book Fascism (1997), Mark Neocleous sums up these paradoxical tendencies by referring to fascism as "a prime example of reactionary modernism" as well as "the culmination of the conservative revolutionary tradition."

=== Liberalism ===
Fascism is strongly opposed to the individualism found in classical liberalism. Fascists accuse liberalism of de-spiritualizing human beings and transforming them into materialistic beings whose highest ideal is moneymaking. In particular, fascism opposes liberalism for its materialism, rationalism, individualism and utilitarianism. Fascists believe that the liberal emphasis on individual freedom produces national divisiveness. Mussolini criticized classical liberalism for its individualistic nature, writing: "Against individualism, the Fascist conception is for the State; ... It is opposed to classical Liberalism ... Liberalism denied the State in the interests of the particular individual; Fascism reaffirms the State as the true reality of the individual." However, Fascists and Nazis support a type of hierarchical individualism in the form of Social Darwinism because they believe it promotes "superior individuals" and weeds out "the weak". They also accuse both Marxism and democracy, with their emphasis on equality, of destroying individuality in favor of the "dead weight" of the masses.

One issue where Fascism is in accord with liberalism is in its support of private property rights and the existence of a market economy. Although Fascism sought to "destroy the existing political order", it had tentatively adopted the economic elements of liberalism, but "completely denied its philosophical principles and the intellectual and moral heritage of modernity". Fascism espoused antimaterialism, which meant that it rejected the "rationalistic, individualistic and utilitarian heritage" that defined the liberal-centric Age of Enlightenment. Nevertheless, between the two pillars of fascist economic policy – national syndicalism and productionism – it was the latter that was given more importance, so the goal of creating a less materialist society was generally not accomplished.

Fascists saw contemporary politics as a life or death struggle of their nations against Marxism, and they believed that liberalism weakened their nations in this struggle and left them defenseless. While the socialist left was seen by the fascists as their main enemy, liberals were seen as the enemy's accomplices, "incompetent guardians of the nation against the class warfare waged by the socialists."

=== Social welfare and public works ===
Fascists opposed social welfare for those they regarded as weak and decadent, but supported state assistance for those they regarded as strong and pure. As such, fascist movements criticized the welfare policies of the democratic governments they opposed, but eventually adopted welfare policies of their own to gain popular support. The Nazis condemned indiscriminate social welfare and charity, whether run by the state or by private entities, because they saw it as "supporting many people who were racially inferior." After coming to power, they adopted a type of selective welfare system that would only help those they deemed to be biologically and racially valuable. Italian Fascists had changing attitudes towards welfare. They took a stance against unemployment benefits upon coming to power in 1922, but later argued that improving the well-being of the labor force could serve the national interest by increasing productive potential, and adopted welfare measures on this basis.

From 1925 to 1939, the Italian Fascist government "embarked upon an elaborate program" of social welfare provision, supplemented by private charity from wealthy industrialists "in the spirit of Fascist class collaboration." This program included food supplementary assistance, infant care, maternity assistance, family allowances per child to encourage higher birth rates, paid vacations, public housing, and insurance for unemployment, occupational diseases, old age and disability. Many of these were continuations of programs already begun under the parliamentary system that fascism had replaced, and they were similar to programs instituted by democratic governments across Europe and North America in the same time period. Social welfare under democratic governments was sometimes more generous, but given that Italy was a poorer country, its efforts were more ambitious, and its legislation "compared favorably with the more advanced European nations and in some respects was more progressive."

Out of a "determination to make Italy the powerful, modern state of his imagination," Mussolini also began a broad campaign of public works after 1925, such that "bridges, canals, and roads were built, hospitals and schools, railway stations and orphanages; swamps were drained and land reclaimed, forests were planted and universities were endowed". The Mussolini administration "devoted 400 million lire of public monies" for school construction between 1922 and 1942 (an average of 20 million lire per year); for comparison, a total of only 60 million lire had been spent on school construction between 1862 and 1922 (an average of 1 million lire per year). Extensive archaeological works were also financed, with the intention of highlighting the legacy of the Roman Empire and clearing ancient monuments of "everything that has grown up round them during the centuries of decadence."

In Germany, the Nazi Party condemned both the public welfare system of the Weimar Republic and private charity and philanthropy as being "evils that had to be eliminated if the German race was to be strengthened and its weakest elements weeded out in the process of natural selection." Once in power, the Nazis drew sharp distinctions between those undeserving and those deserving of assistance, and strove to direct all public and private aid towards the latter. They argued that this approach represented "racial self-help" and not indiscriminate charity or universal social welfare.

An organization called National Socialist People's Welfare (Nationalsozialistische Volkswohlfahrt, NSV) was given the task of taking over the functions of social welfare institutions and "coordinating" the private charities, which had previously been run mainly by the churches and by the labour movement. Hitler instructed NSV chairman Erich Hilgenfeldt to "see to the disbanding of all private welfare institutions," in an effort to direct who was to receive social benefits. Welfare benefits were abruptly withdrawn from Jews, Communists, many Social Democrats, Jehovah's Witnesses, and others that were considered enemies of the Nazi regime, at first without any legal justification.

The NSV officially defined its mandate very broadly. For instance, one of the divisions of the NSV, the Office of Institutional and Special Welfare, was responsible "for travellers' aid at railway stations; relief for ex-convicts; 'support' for re-migrants from abroad; assistance for the physically disabled, hard-of-hearing, deaf, mute, and blind; relief for the elderly, homeless and alcoholics; and the fight against illicit drugs and epidemics". But the NSV also explicitly stated that all such benefits would only be available to "racially superior" persons. NSV administrators were able to mount an effort towards the "cleansing of their cities of 'asocials'," who were deemed unworthy of receiving assistance for various reasons.

The NSV limited its assistance to those who were "racially sound, capable of and willing to work, politically reliable, and willing and able to reproduce," and excluded non-Aryans, the "work-shy", "asocials" and the "hereditarily ill." The agency successfully "projected a powerful image of caring and support" for "those who were judged to have got into difficulties through no fault of their own," as over 17 million Germans had obtained assistance from the NSV by 1939. However, the organization also resorted to intrusive questioning and monitoring to judge who was worthy of support, and for this reason it was "feared and disliked among society's poorest."

=== Socialism and communism ===
Fascism is strongly opposed to socialism and communism, due to their support of class revolution as well as "decadent" values, including internationalism, egalitarianism, horizontal collectivism, materialism and cosmopolitanism. Fascists have thus commonly campaigned with anti-communist agendas. Fascists saw themselves as building a new aristocracy, a "warrior race or nation", based on purity of blood, heroism and virility. They strongly opposed ideas of universal human equality and advocated hierarchy in its place, adhering to "the Aristotelian conviction, amplified by the modern elite theorists, that the human race is divided by nature into sheep and shepherds." Fascists believed in the survival of the fittest, and argued that society should be led by an elite of "the fittest, the strongest, the most heroic, the most productive, and, even more than that, those most fervently possessed with the national idea."

Marxism and fascism oppose each other primarily because Marxism "called on the workers of the world to unite across national borders in a global battle against their oppressors, treating nation-states and national pride as tools in the arsenal of bourgeois propaganda", while fascism, on the contrary, exalted the interests of the nation or race as the highest good, and rejected all ideas of universal human interests standing above the nation or race. Within the nation, Marxism calls for class struggle by the working class against the ruling class, while fascism calls for collaboration between the classes to achieve national rejuvenation. Fascism proposes a type of society in which different classes continue to exist, where the rich and the poor both serve the national interest and do not oppose each other.

Following the Bolshevik revolution of 1917 and the creation of the Soviet Union, fear of and opposition to communism became a major aspect of European politics in the 1920s and 1930s. Fascists were able to take advantage of this situation by presenting themselves as the political force which was most capable of defeating communism. This was a major factor in enabling fascists to make alliances with the old establishment and to come to power in Italy and Germany, in spite of fascism's own radical agenda, because of the shared anti-Marxism of fascists and conservatives. The Nazis in particular came to power "on the back of a powerfully anticommunist program and in an atmosphere of widespread fear of a Bolshevik revolution at home," and their first concentration camps in 1933 were meant for holding socialist and communist political prisoners. Both Fascist Italy and Nazi Germany also suppressed independent working-class organizations.

The Bolshevik revolutionary Leon Trotsky formulated a theory to explain the rise of fascism based on a dialectical interpretation of events to analyze the manifestation of Italian fascism and the early emergence of Nazi Germany from 1930 to 1933. He was an early observer on the rise of Nazi Germany during his final years in exile, and he advocated the tactic of a united front to oppose fascism. Trotsky was also a strong critic of the shifting Comintern policy position under Stalin which directed German Communists to treat social democrats as "social fascists". Historian Bertrand Patenaude believed that the Comintern policy following the "Great Break" facilitated the rise of Hitler's party.

Fascism regarded mainstream socialism as a bitter enemy. In opposing the latter's internationalist aspect, it sometimes defined itself as a new, alternative, nationalist form of socialism. Hitler at times attempted to redefine the word socialism, such as saying: "Socialism! That is an unfortunate word altogether. ... What does socialism really mean? If people have something to eat and their pleasures, then they have their socialism". In 1930, Hitler said: "Our adopted term 'Socialist' has nothing to do with Marxist Socialism. Marxism is anti-property; true Socialism is not". The name that Hitler later wished he had used to describe his political party was "social revolutionary".

In turn, mainstream socialists have typically rejected and opposed fascism. Many communists regarded fascism as a tool of the ruling-class to destroy the working-class, regarding it as "the open but indirect dictatorship of capital." Nikita Khrushchev sardonically remarked: "In modern times the word Socialism has become very fashionable, and it has also been used very loosely. Even Hitler used to babble about Socialism, and he worked the word into the name of his Nazi [National Socialist] party. The whole world knows what sort of Socialism Hitler had in mind".

However, the agency and genuine belief of fascists was recognized by some communist writers, like Antonio Gramsci, Palmiro Togliatti and Otto Bauer, who instead believed fascism to be a genuine mass movement that arose as a consequence of the specific socio-economic conditions of the societies it arose in. Despite the mutual antagonism that would later develop between the two, the attitude of communists towards early fascism was more ambivalent than it might appear from the writings of individual communist theorists. In the early days, Fascism was sometimes perceived as less of a mortal rival to revolutionary Marxism than as a heresy from it. Mussolini's government was one of the first in Western Europe to diplomatically recognise the USSR, doing so in 1924. On 20 June 1923, Karl Radek gave a speech before the Comintern in which he proposed a common front with the Nazis in Germany. However, the two radicalisms were mutually exclusive and they later become profound enemies.

While fascism opposes Bolshevism, both ideologies advocate the establishment of one-party states and the use of political party militias. Fascists and communists also agree on the need for violent revolution to forge a new era, and they hold common positions in their opposition to liberalism, capitalism, individualism and parliamentarism. Fascists and Soviet communists both created totalitarianism systems after coming into power and both used violence and terror when it was advantageous to do so. However, unlike communists, fascists were more supportive of capitalism and defended economic elites.

Fascism denounces democratic socialism as a failure. Fascists see themselves as supporting a moral and spiritual renewal based on a warlike spirit of violence and heroism, and they condemn democratic socialism for advocating "humanistic lachrimosity" such as natural rights, justice, and equality. Fascists also oppose democratic socialism for its support of reformism and the parliamentary system that fascism typically rejects.

Italian Fascism had ideological connections with revolutionary syndicalism, and in particular with Sorelian syndicalism. Benito Mussolini mentioned revolutionary syndicalist Georges Sorel – along with Hubert Lagardelle and his journal Le Mouvement socialiste, which advocated a technocratic vision of society – as major influences on fascism. According to Zeev Sternhell, World War I caused Italian revolutionary syndicalism to develop into a national syndicalism, reuniting all social classes, which later transitioned into Italian Fascism, such that "most syndicalist leaders were among the founders of the Fascist movement" and "many even held key posts" in the Italian Fascist regime by the mid-1920s.

The Sorelian emphasis on the need for a revolution based upon action of intuition, a cult of energy and vitality, activism, heroism and the use of myth was used by fascists. Many prominent fascist figures were formerly associated with revolutionary syndicalism, including Mussolini, Robert Michels and Paolo Orano.

== See also ==
- Anti-fascism
- Clerical fascism
- Crypto-fascism
- Definitions of fascism
- Ecofascism
- Economics of fascism
- Fascist (insult)
- Fascio
- Fascist architecture
- Fascist symbolism
- History of fascism (pre-1922)
- History of fascism (1922–1945)
- History of fascism (1945–present)
- Ideology of the Committee of Union and Progress
- List of fascist movements
- List of fascist movements by country
- Para-fascism
- Producerism
- Proto-fascism

== Bibliography ==
- Antliff, Mark (2007). Avant-Garde Fascism: The Mobilization of Myth, Art, and Culture in France, 1909–1939. Duke University Press. ISBN 978-0-8223-9047-3.
- Bendersky, Joseph W. (2014). A Concise History of Nazi Germany. Lanham, MD: Rowman & Littlefield Publishers, Inc. ISBN 978-1-4422-2269-4.
- Blamires, Cyprian; Jackson, Paul (2006). World Fascism: A Historical Encyclopedia. Vol. 1. ABC-CLIO. ISBN 978-1-57607-940-9.
- Borsella, Cristogianni (2007). Fascist Italy: A Concise Historical Narrative. Branden Books. ISBN 978-0-8283-2155-6.
- Cole, Myke (1 August 2019). "The Sparta Fetish Is a Cultural Cancer". The New Republic. Archived from the original on 26 March 2025.
- De Grand, Alexander J. (2004). Fascist Italy and Nazi Germany: The "fascist" style of rule. London, England; New York: Routledge.
- Gerwarth, Robert (2005). The Bismarck Myth. Oxford University Press.
- Grafton, Anthony; Most, Glenn W.; Settis, Salvatore (2010). The Classical Tradition. Cambridge, Massachusetts: Harvard University Press.
- Gregor, Anthony James (1979). Italian Fascism and Developmental Dictatorship. Princeton University Press. ISBN 978-0-691-05286-1.
- Griffin, Roger (1991). The Nature of Fascism. Palgrave Macmillan. ISBN 978-0-312-07132-5.
- Evans, Richard J. (2005). The Third Reich in Power, 1933–1939. New York: Penguin Press. ISBN 0-7139-9649-8.
- Halperin, W. William (1964). Mussolini and Italian Fascism. Princeton, New Jersey: D. Van Nostrand Company. ISBN 0-442-00067-7.
- Laqueur, Walter (1978). Fascism: A Reader's Guide: Analyses, Interpretations, Bibliography. University of California Press. ISBN 978-0-520-03642-0.
- Mack Smith, Denis (1983). Mussolini. New York: Vintage Books. ISBN 0-394-71658-2.
- Mann, Michael (2004). Fascists. New York: Cambridge University Press. ISBN 0-521-53855-6.
- Neocleous, Mark (1997). Fascism. University of Minnesota Press.
- Overy, Richard (1994). War and Economy in the Third Reich. Oxford University Press. ISBN 978-0-19-820290-5.
- Paxton, Robert O. (2004). The Anatomy of Fascism. New York: Random House. ISBN 1-4000-4094-9.
- Payne, Stanley G. (1996). A History of Fascism, 1914–1945. Madison, Wisconsin: University of Wisconsin Press. ISBN 978-0-299-14873-7.
- Payne, Stanley (1999). Fascism in Spain: 1923–1977. Madison: The University of Wisconsin Press. ISBN 0-299-16564-7.
- Salvemini, Gaetano (1936). Under the Axe of Fascism. V. Gollancz, Limited.
- Schmidt, Carl T. (1939). The corporate state in action; Italy under fascism. Oxford University Press.
- Sternhell, Zeev (1986). Neither Right nor Left: Fascist Ideology in France. Princeton, New Jersey: Princeton University Press. ISBN 978-0-691-00629-1.
- Sternhell, Zeev; Sznajder, Mario; Asheri, Maia (1994). The Birth of Fascist Ideology: From Cultural Rebellion to Political Revolution. Translated by Maisei, David. Princeton, New Jersey and Woodstock, Oxfordshire: Princeton University Press. ISBN 978-0-691-04486-6.
- Sternhell, Zeev (1998). "Crisis of Fin-de-siècle Thought". In Griffin, Roger (ed.). International Fascism: Theories, Causes and the New Consensus. London and New York: Bloomsbury Academic. ISBN 978-0340706138.
- Weiss, John (1967). The Fascist Tradition: Radical right-wing extremism in modern Europe. New York, Evanston (Illinois), and London: Harper & Row. ISBN 0-06-046995-1.
- Welk, William G. (1938). Fascist economy policy; an analysis of Italy's economic experiment. Harvard University Press.
- Williams, Roger Lawrence (2015). The Mortal Napoleon The Third. Princeton University Press.
- Woodley, Daniel (2010). Fascism and Political Theory. New York: Routledge. ISBN 978-0-415-47354-5.
