= History of fascism (1922–1945) =

The history of fascism is the ideological, historical, and intellectual influences that culminated in the development of fascism, a far-right, authoritarian, and ultranationalist political ideology and movement that rose to prominence in early-20th-century Europe. The roots have been seen in the political culture of ancient Greece and ancient Rome, and later in Nazism and Italian Fascism.

Fascism emerged throughout the 20th century as a diverse, and an evolving synthesis of reactionary and revolutionary ideas, rather than a single, coherent system.

== Background ==
The ideological roots of fascism have been traced to the 1880s and in particular to the fin de siècle theme of that time. The theme originated from revolt against materialism, rationalism, positivism, bourgeois society, and liberal democracy.

== Rise to power and initial international spread of fascism (1922–1929) ==
Beginning in 1922, Fascist paramilitaries escalated their strategy by switching from attacks on socialist offices and the homes of socialist leadership figures to the violent occupation of cities. The Fascists met little serious resistance from authorities and proceeded to take over several cities, including Bologna, Bolzano, Cremona, Ferrara, Fiume and Trento. The Fascists attacked the headquarters of socialist and Catholic unions in Cremona and imposed forced Italianisation upon the German-speaking population of Trent and Bolzano. After seizing these cities, the Fascists made plans to take Rome.

=== Fascist Italy ===
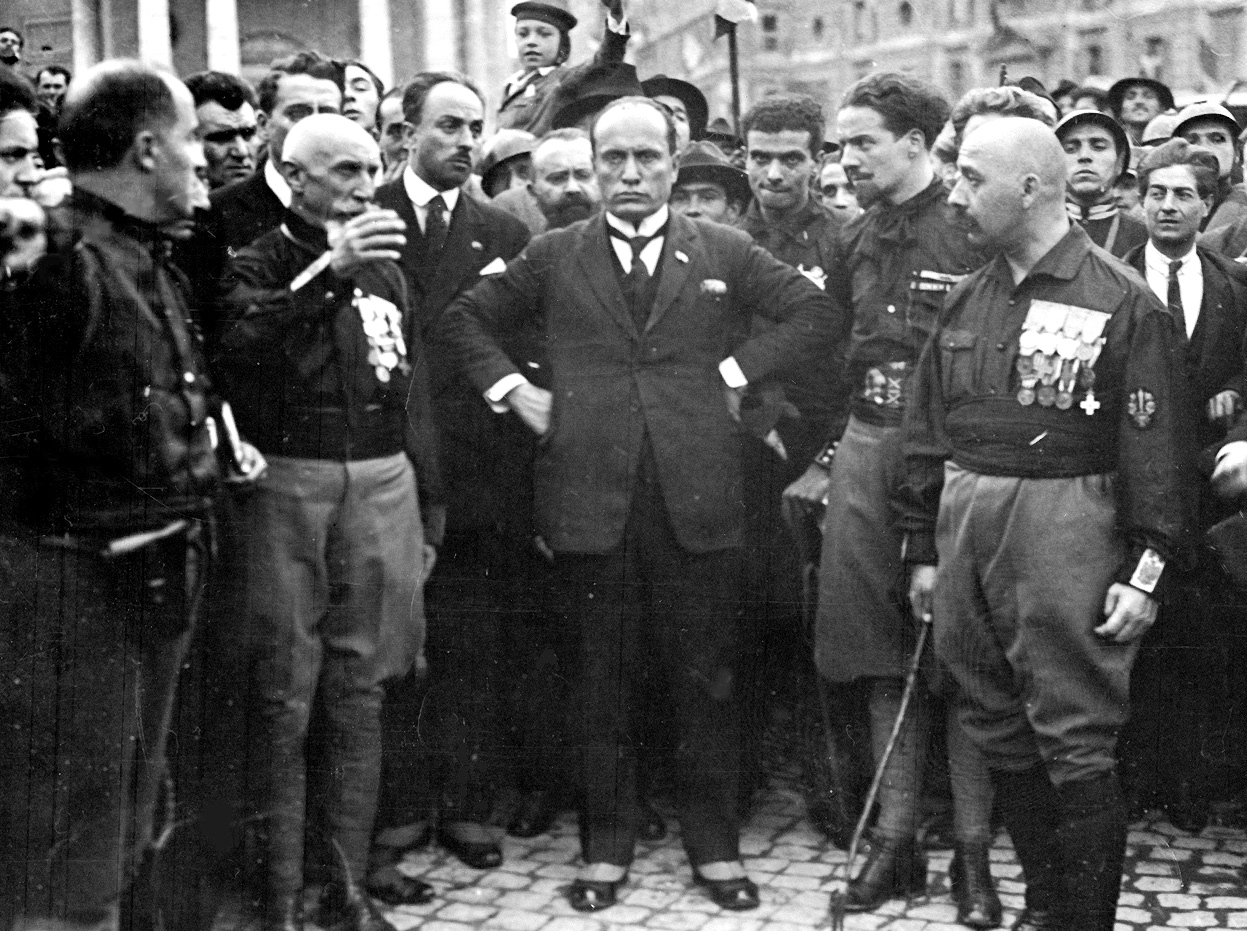
Benito Mussolini (center in a suit with fists against the body) along with other Fascist leader figures and Blackshirts during the March on Rome

On 24 October 1922, the Fascist Party held its annual congress in Naples, where Mussolini ordered Blackshirts to take control of public buildings and trains and to converge on three points around Rome. The march would be led by four prominent Fascist leaders representing its different factions: Italo Balbo, a Blackshirt leader; General Emilio De Bono; Michele Bianchi, an ex syndicalist; and Cesare Maria De Vecchi, a monarchist Fascist. Mussolini himself remained in Milan to await the results of the actions. The Fascists managed to seize control of several post offices and trains in northern Italy while the Italian government, led by a left-wing coalition, was internally divided and unable to respond to the Fascist advances. The Italian government had been in a steady state of turmoil, with many governments being created and then being defeated. The Italian government initially took action to prevent the Fascists from entering Rome, but King Victor Emmanuel III of Italy perceived the risk of bloodshed in Rome in response to attempting to disperse the Fascists to be too high. Some political organisations, such as the conservative Italian Nationalist Association, "assured King Victor Emmanuel that their own Sempre Pronti militia was ready to fight the Blackshirts" if they entered Rome, but their offer was never accepted. Victor Emmanuel III decided to appoint Mussolini as Prime Minister of Italy and Mussolini arrived in Rome on 30 October to accept the appointment. Fascist propaganda aggrandised this event, known as "March on Rome", as a "seizure" of power due to Fascists' heroic exploits.

Upon being appointed Prime Minister of Italy, Mussolini had to form a coalition government because the Fascists did not have control over the Italian parliament. The coalition government included a cabinet led by Mussolini and thirteen other ministers, only three of whom were Fascists, while others included representatives from the army and the navy, two Catholic Popolari members, two democratic liberals, one conservative liberal, one social democrat, one Nationalist member and the philosopher Giovanni Gentile. Mussolini's coalition government initially pursued economically liberal policies under the direction of liberal finance minister Alberto De Stefani from the centre of the National Fascist Party, including balancing the budget through deep cuts to the civil service. Initially little drastic change in government policy occurred, and repressive police actions against communists and d'Annunzian rebels were limited. At the same time, Mussolini consolidated his control over the National Fascist Party by creating a governing executive for the party, the Grand Council of Fascism, whose agenda he controlled. In addition, the squadristi blackshirt militia was transformed into the state-run MVSN, led by regular army officers. Militant squadristi were initially highly dissatisfied with Mussolini's government and demanded a "Fascist revolution".

In this period, to appease the King of Italy, Mussolini formed a close political alliance between the Italian Fascists and Italy's conservative faction in Parliament, which was led by Luigi Federzoni, a conservative monarchist and nationalist who was a member of the Italian Nationalist Association (ANI). The ANI joined the National Fascist Party in 1923. Because of the merger of the Nationalists with the Fascists, tensions existed between the conservative nationalist and revolutionary syndicalist factions of the movement. The conservative and syndicalist factions of the Fascist movement sought to reconcile their differences, secure unity and promote fascism by taking on the views of each other. Conservative nationalist Fascists promoted fascism as a revolutionary movement to appease the revolutionary syndicalists, while to appease conservative nationalists, the revolutionary syndicalists declared they wanted to secure social stability and ensure economic productivity. This sentiment included most syndicalist Fascists, particularly Edmondo Rossoni, who as secretary-general of the General Confederation of Fascist Syndical Corporations sought "labor's autonomy and class consciousness".

The Fascists began their attempt to entrench Fascism in Italy with the Acerbo Law, which guaranteed a plurality of the seats in parliament to any party or coalition list in an election that received 25% or more of the vote. The Acerbo Law was passed in spite of numerous abstentions from the vote. In the 1924 election, the Fascists, along with moderates and conservatives, formed a coalition candidate list, and through considerable Fascist violence and intimidation, the list won with 66% of the vote, allowing it to receive 403 seats, most of which went to the Fascists. In the aftermath of the election, a crisis and political scandal erupted after Socialist Party deputy Giacomo Matteotti was kidnapped and murdered by a Fascist. The liberals and the leftist minority in parliament walked out in protest in what became known as the Aventine Secession. On 3 January 1925, Mussolini addressed the Fascist-dominated Italian parliament and declared that he was personally responsible for what happened, but he insisted that he had done nothing wrong and proclaimed himself dictator of Italy, assuming full responsibility for the government and announcing the dismissal of parliament.

From 1925 to 1929, Fascism steadily became entrenched in power: opposition deputies were denied access to parliament, censorship was introduced and a December 1925 decree made Mussolini solely responsible to the King. Efforts to increase Fascist influence over Italian society accelerated beginning in 1926, with Fascists taking positions in local administration and 30% of all prefects being administered by appointed Fascists by 1929. In 1929, the Fascist regime gained the political support and blessing of the Roman Catholic Church after the regime signed a concordat with the Church, known as the Lateran Treaty, which gave the papacy recognition as a sovereign state (Vatican City) and financial compensation for the seizure of Church lands by the liberal state in the 19th century. Two years later the Church renounced fascism in the Encyclical Non Abbiamo Bisogno as a "pagan idolatry of the state" which teaches "hatred, violence and irreverence". Not long after signing the agreement, by Mussolini's own confession, the Church had threatened to have him "excommunicated", in part because of his intractable nature, but also because he had "confiscated more issues of Catholic newspapers in the next three months than in the previous seven years". By the late 1930s, Mussolini became more vocal in his anti-clerical rhetoric, repeatedly denouncing the Catholic Church and discussing ways to depose the pope. He took the position that the "papacy was a malignant tumour in the body of Italy and must 'be rooted out once and for all,' because there was no room in Rome for both the Pope and himself." In her 1974 book, Mussolini's widow Rachele stated that her husband had always been an atheist until near the end of his life, writing that her husband was "basically irreligious until the later years of his life".

Though Fascist propaganda had begun to speak of the new regime as an all-encompassing "totalitarian" state beginning in 1925, the Fascist Party and regime never gained total control over Italy's institutions. King Victor Emmanuel III remained head of state, the armed forces and the judicial system retained considerable autonomy from the Fascist state, Fascist militias were under military control and initially, the economy had relative autonomy as well.

Between 1922 and 1925, Fascism sought to accommodate the Italian Liberal Party, conservatives, and nationalists under Italy's coalition government, where major alterations to its political agenda were made – alterations such as abandoning its previous populism, republicanism, and anticlericalism – and adopting policies of economic liberalism under Alberto De Stefani, a Center Party member who was Italy's Minister of Finance until dismissed by Mussolini after the imposition of a single-party dictatorship in 1925. The Fascist regime also accepted the Roman Catholic Church and the monarchy as institutions in Italy. To appeal to Italian conservatives, Fascism adopted policies such as promoting family values, including the promotion of policies designed to reduce the number of women in the workforce, limiting the woman's role to that of a mother. In an effort to expand Italy's population to facilitate Mussolini's future plans to control the Mediterranean region, the Fascists banned literature on birth control and increased penalties for abortion in 1926, declaring both crimes against the state. Though Fascism adopted a number of positions designed to appeal to reactionaries, the Fascists also sought to maintain Fascism's revolutionary character, with Angelo Oliviero Olivetti saying that "Fascism would like to be conservative, but it will [be] by being revolutionary". The Fascists supported revolutionary action and committed to secure law and order to appeal to both conservatives and syndicalists.

The Fascist regime began to create a corporatist economic system in 1925 with the creation of the Palazzo Vidoni Pact, in which the Italian employers' association Confindustria and fascist trade unions agreed to recognise each other as the sole representatives of Italy's employers and employees, excluding non-Fascist trade unions. The Fascist regime created a Ministry of Corporations that organised the Italian economy into 22 sectoral corporations, banned all independent trade unions, banned workers' strikes and lock-outs, and in 1927 issued the Charter of Labour, which established workers' rights and duties and created labor tribunals to arbitrate employer-employee disputes. In practice, the sectoral corporations exercised little independence and were largely controlled by the regime, while employee organisations were rarely led by employees themselves, but instead by appointed Fascist party members.

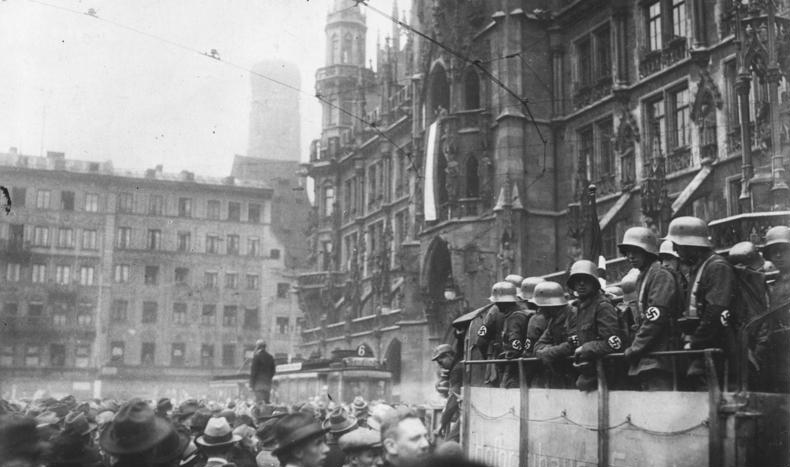
Nazis in Munich during the Beer Hall Putsch

In the 1920s, Fascist Italy pursued an aggressive foreign policy that included an attack on the Greek island of Corfu, aims to expand Italian territory in the Balkans, plans to wage war against Turkey and Yugoslavia, attempts to bring Yugoslavia into civil war by supporting Croat and Macedonian separatists to legitimise Italian intervention, and making Albania a de facto protectorate of Italy (which was achieved through diplomatic means by 1927). In response to revolt in the Italian colony of Libya, Fascist Italy abandoned the previous liberal-era colonial policy of cooperation with local leaders. Instead, claiming that Italians were a superior race to African races and thereby had the right to colonise the "inferior" Africans, it sought to settle 10 to 15 million Italians in Libya. This resulted in an aggressive military campaign against the Libyans, including mass killings, the use of concentration camps, and the forced starvation of thousands of people. Italian authorities committed ethnic cleansing by forcibly expelling 100,000 Bedouin Cyrenaicans, half the population of Cyrenaica in Libya, from land that was slated to be given to Italian settlers.

=== Inspiring other fascists ===
The March on Rome brought Fascism international attention. One early admirer of the Italian Fascists was Adolf Hitler, who less than a month after the March had begun to model himself and the Nazi Party upon Mussolini and the Fascists. The Nazis, led by Hitler and the German war hero Erich Ludendorff, attempted a "March on Berlin" modelled upon the March on Rome, which resulted in the failed Beer Hall Putsch in Munich in November 1923, where the Nazis briefly captured Bavarian Minister-President Gustav Ritter von Kahr and announced the creation of a new German government to be led by a triumvirate of von Kahr, Hitler, and Ludendorff. The Beer Hall Putsch was crushed by Bavarian police, and Hitler and other leading Nazis were arrested and detained until 1925.

Emblem of MOVE, ca. 1920

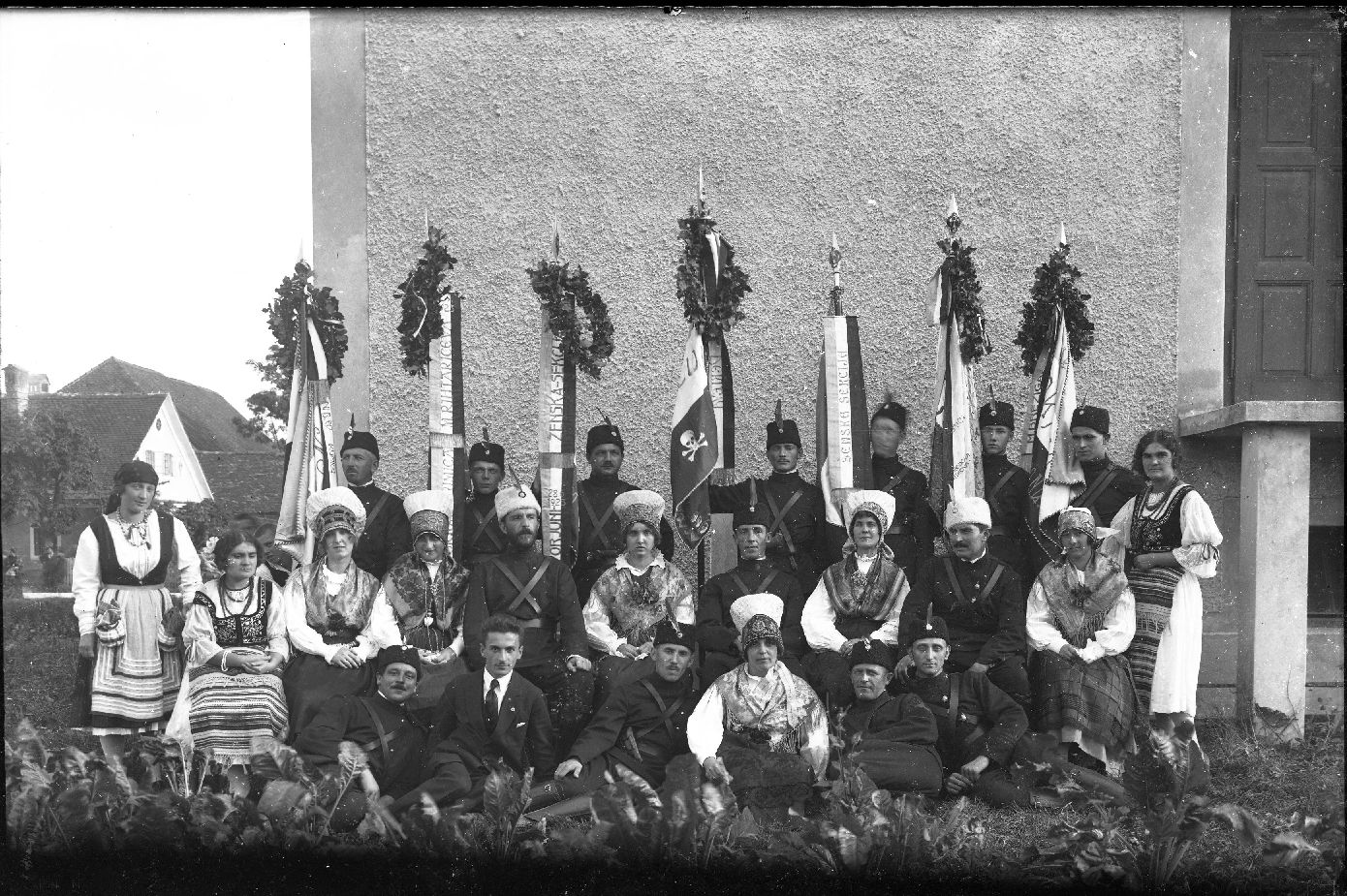
ORJUNA flag presentation in Vič near Ljubljana, Yugoslavia.

Another early admirer of Italian Fascism was Gyula Gömbös, leader of the Hungarian National Defence Association (known by its acronym MOVE), one of several groups in Hungary that were known as the "right radicals." Gömbös described himself as a "national socialist" and championed radical land reform and "Christian capital" in opposition to "Jewish capital." He also advocated a revanchist foreign policy and in 1923 stated the need for a "march on Budapest". Yugoslavia briefly had a significant fascist movement, the ORJUNA, which supported Yugoslavism, advocated the creation of a corporatist economy, opposed democracy and took part in violent attacks on communists, though it was opposed to the Italian government due to Yugoslav border disputes with Italy. ORJUNA was dissolved in 1929 when the King of Yugoslavia banned political parties and created a royal dictatorship, though ORJUNA supported the King's decision. Amid a political crisis in Spain involving increased strike activity and rising support for anarchism, Spanish army commander Miguel Primo de Rivera engaged in a successful coup against the Spanish government in 1923 and installed himself as a dictator as head of a conservative military junta that dismantled the established party system of government. Upon achieving power, Primo de Rivera sought to resolve the economic crisis by presenting himself as a compromise arbitrator figure between workers and bosses and his regime created a corporatist economic system based on the Italian Fascist model. In Lithuania in 1926, Antanas Smetona rose to power and founded a parafascist regime under his Lithuanian Nationalist Union.

== International surge of fascism and World War II (1929–1945) ==
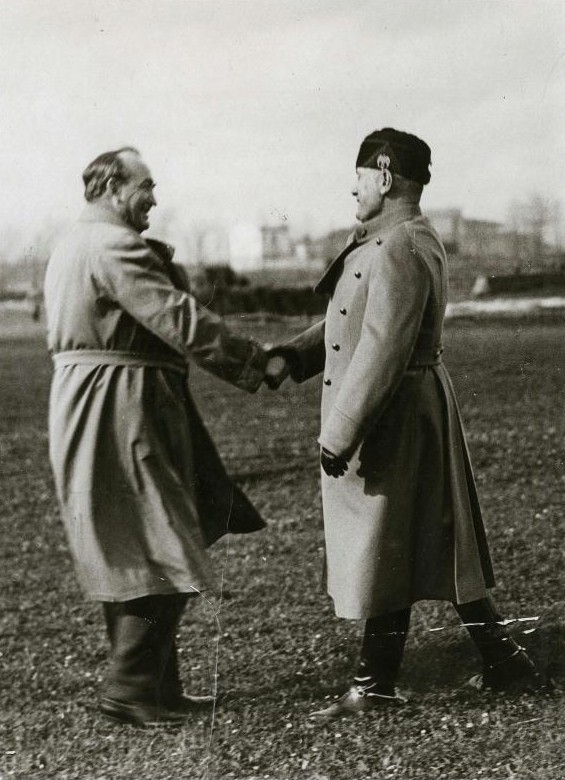
Hungarian Prime Minister Gyula Gömbös (left) meeting with Mussolini (right)

=== The Great Depression ===
The conditions of economic hardship caused by the Great Depression brought about an international surge of social unrest. Fascist propaganda blamed the problems of the long depression of the 1930s on minorities and scapegoats: "Judeo-Masonic-bolshevik" conspiracies, left-wing internationalism and the presence of immigrants.

The Great Depression in Germany contributed to the rise of the Nazi Party, which resulted in the demise of the Weimar Republic and the establishment of the fascist regime, Nazi Germany, under the leadership of Adolf Hitler. With the rise of Hitler and the Nazis to power in 1933, liberal democracy was dissolved in Germany and the Nazis mobilised the country for war, with expansionist territorial aims against several countries. In the 1930s, the Nazis implemented racial laws that deliberately discriminated against, disenfranchised and persecuted Jews and other racial and minority groups.

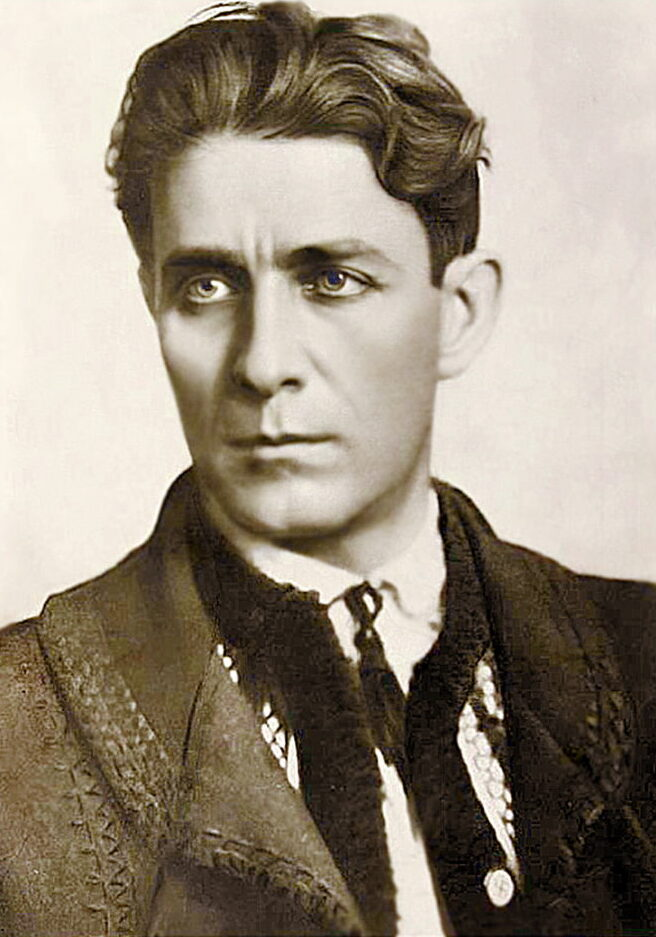
Corneliu Zelea Codreanu, founder of the Iron Guard in Romania

Fascist movements grew in strength elsewhere in Europe. Hungarian fascist Gyula Gömbös rose to power as Prime Minister of Hungary in 1932, he created an eight-hour work day and a forty-eight-hour work week in industry; sought to entrench a corporatist economy; and pursued irredentist claims on Hungary's neighbors.

The fascist Iron Guard movement in Romania soared in political support after 1933, gaining representation in the Romanian government, and an Iron Guard member assassinated Romanian prime minister Ion Duca. King Carol II opposed the Iron Guard, and after working with a rivalling fascist movement, eventually introduced his personal dictatorship with fascist characteristics. Carol II was able to repress the Iron Guard until they gained the support of General Ion Antonescu. The Iron Guard was the only fascist movement outside Germany and Italy to come to power without foreign assistance, though they were subsequently repressed by Antonescu due to a revolt by Legionnaires. The Iron Guard had little in the way of a concrete program and placed more emphasis on ideas of religious and spiritual revival.

During the 6 February 1934 crisis, France faced the greatest domestic political turmoil since the Dreyfus Affair when the fascist Francist Movement and multiple far-right movements rioted en masse in Paris against the French government resulting in major political violence. The Francist Movement was supported by Action Française, Jeunesses Patriotes, Croix-de-Feu. Action Française was founded before the rise of Italian fascism, and is sometimes regarded as the first fascist movement, while others categorise it as proto-fascist.

A variety of para-fascist governments that borrowed elements from fascism were formed during the Great Depression, including those of Greece, Lithuania, Poland and Yugoslavia.

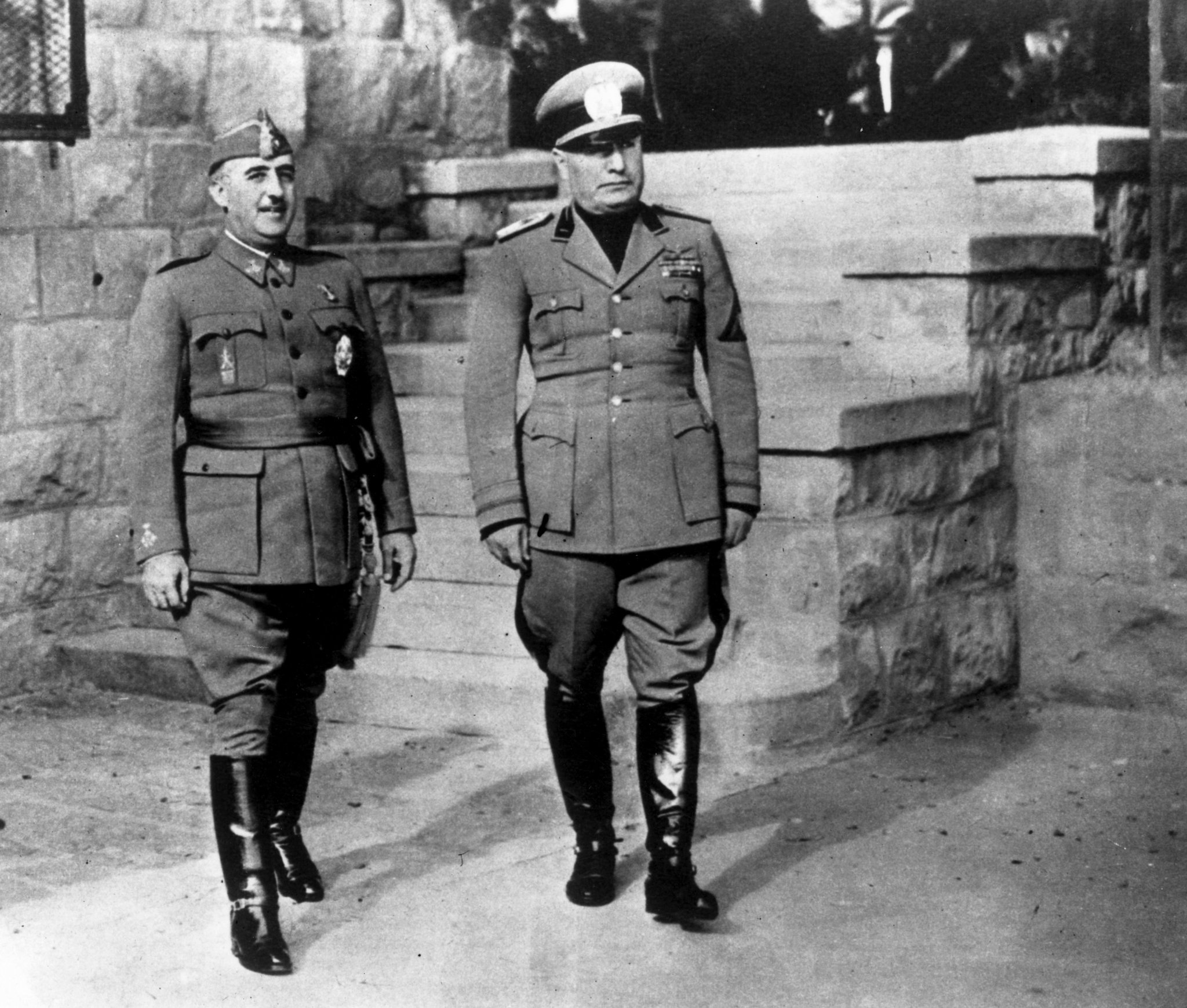
Spanish Caudillo Francisco Franco with Mussolini in Bordighera, Italy, in 1941.

In Spain, shortly after the Popular Front's victory in the 1936 election, groups of officers, both active and retired, got together to discuss a coup. By the end of April General Emilio Mola emerged as the leader of a national conspiracy network. Francisco Franco became a key player because of his prestige as a former director of the military academy and as the man who suppressed the Asturian miners' strike of 1934. The coup was initiated on 18 July 1936, beginning the Spanish Civil War. On 19 April 1937, Franco united the leading parties of the nationalist faction, the national syndicalist Falange Española de las JONS with the Carlist Comunión Tradicionalista, with the Unification Decree, forming the Falange Española Tradicionalista y de las JONS (FET y de las JONS). The official ideology was the Falangists' 27 puntos—reduced after the unification to 26. While the Carlists came off worse in this forced union, Franco had correctly deduced that they would be more obedient and less politically minded, making it less of a concern. Franco's troops conquered the last holdout of Catalonia in a whirlwind campaign during January and February of 1939. On 27 February, the United Kingdom and France recognized the Franco regime. The subsequent Falangist one-party state in Spain was officially neutral during World War II, although Franco's rise to power had been directly assisted by the militaries of Fascist Italy and Nazi Germany during the Spanish Civil War. The first years were characterized by a repression against the anti-fascist ideologies, deep censorship, and the suppression of democratic institutions (such as the elected Parliament, the Spanish Constitution of 1931, and the regional statutes of autonomy).

=== Fascism outside Europe ===
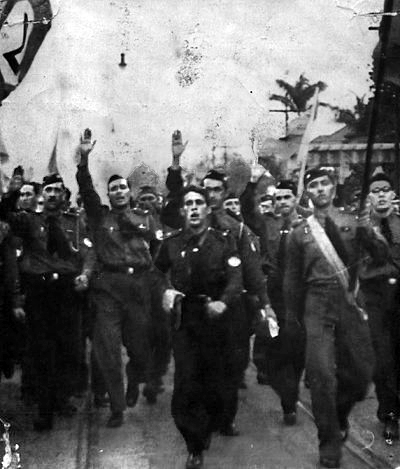
Integralists marching in Brazil

In the Americas, several mostly short-lived fascist governments and prominent fascist movements were formed during this period. Argentine President General José Félix Uriburu proposed that Argentina be reorganised along corporatist and fascist lines. In Brazil, the Brazilian Integralists led by Plínio Salgado claimed as many as 200,000 members, although following coup attempts it faced a crackdown from the Estado Novo of Getúlio Vargas in 1937. In the 1930s, the National Socialist Movement of Chile gained seats in Chile's parliament and attempted a coup d'état that resulted in the Seguro Obrero massacre of 1938. In Paraguay in 1940, Paraguayan President General Higinio Morínigo began his rule as a dictator with the support of pro-fascist military officers, appealed to the masses, exiled opposition leaders and only abandoned his pro-fascist policies after the end of World War II. In Peru, president Luis Miguel Sánchez Cerro founded the Revolutionary Union in 1931 as the state party for his dictatorship. It was a fascist political party which remained in power to 1933 with the death of Sánchez Cerro. After which Luis A. Flores lead the party as its supreme chief. Flores sought to mobilise mass support for the group's nationalism and started a paramilitary blackshirts arm as a copy of the Italian group, but the Union lost heavily in the 1936 elections and faded into obscurity. One of the party's earliest and fervent members was Raúl Ferrero Rebagliati, who later served as the 107th Prime Minister of Peru.

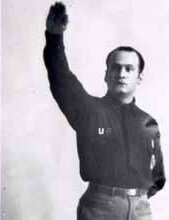
Luis A. Flores, Prime Minister of Peru in 1932, shown saluting in the party uniform of the Revolutionary Union of Peru that he led as its Supreme Chief from 1933–1956

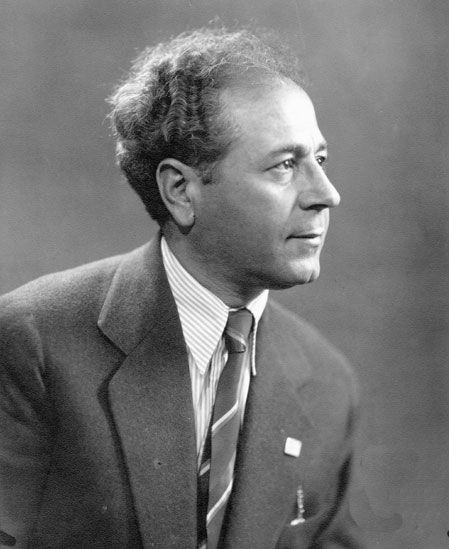
SSNP founder Antoun Saadeh greatly admired Adolf Hitler and incorporated Nazi symbolism into the SSNP insigna. The SSNP declared Saadeh to be their "leader for life" and addressed him by the title Az-Za'im ("The Leader").

Fascism also expanded its influence outside Europe, especially in East Asia, the Middle East and South America. In China, Wang Jingwei's Kai-Tsu p'ai (Reorganisation) faction of the Kuomintang (Nationalist Party of China) supported Nazism in the late 1930s. In Japan, a Nazi movement called the Tōhōkai was formed by Seigō Nakano. The Al-Muthanna Club of Iraq was a pan-Arab movement that supported Nazism and exercised its influence in the Iraqi government through cabinet minister Saib Shawkat who formed a paramilitary youth movement. Another ultra-nationalist movement that arose in the Arab world during the 1930s was the irredentist Syrian Social Nationalist Party (SSNP) led by Antoun Sa'adeh, which advocated the formation of "Greater Syria". Inspired by the models of both Italian fascism and German Nazism, Sa'adeh believed that Syrians were a "distinct and naturally superior race". SSNP engaged in violent activities to assert control over Syria, organise the country along militaristic lines and then impose its ideological project on the Greater Syrian region. During the Second World War, Sa'adeh developed close ties with officials of Fascist Italy and Nazi Germany. Although SSNP had managed to become the closest cognate of European fascism in the Arab World, the party failed to make any social impact and was eventually banned for terrorist activities during the 1950s.

=== Interventionism and expansionism ===
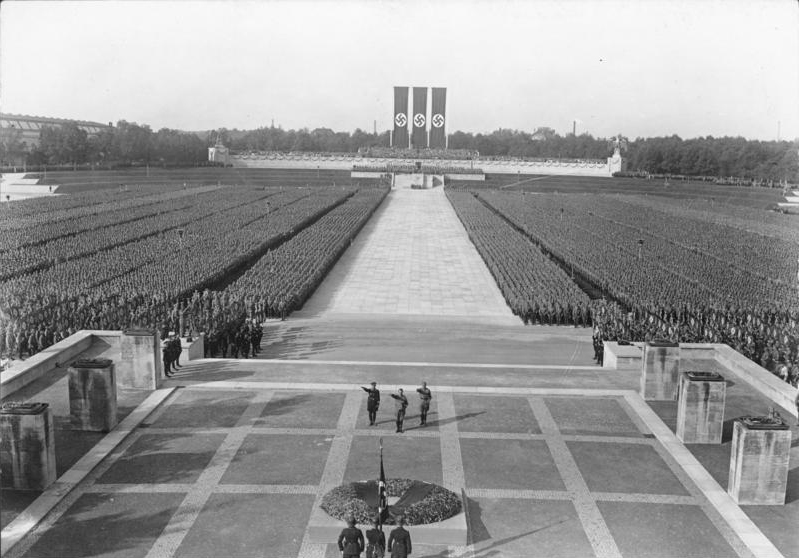
Nazi Party rally in Nuremberg, Germany, in 1934

During the Great Depression, Mussolini promoted active state intervention in the economy. He denounced the contemporary "supercapitalism" that he claimed began in 1914 as a failure because of its alleged decadence, its support for unlimited consumerism, and its intention to create the "standardization of humankind". Fascist Italy created the Institute for Industrial Reconstruction (IRI), a giant state-owned firm and holding company that provided state funding to failing private enterprises. The IRI was made a permanent institution in Fascist Italy in 1937, pursued fascist policies to create national autarky and had the power to take over private firms to maximise war production. While Hitler's regime only nationalised 500 companies in key industries by the early 1940s, Mussolini declared in 1934, "[t]hree-fourths of Italian economy, industrial and agricultural, is in the hands of the state."

Due to the worldwide depression, Mussolini's government was able to take over most of Italy's largest failing banks, who held controlling interest in many Italian businesses. The IRI reported in early 1934 that they held assets of "48.5 percent of the share capital of Italy", which later included the capital of the banks themselves. Political historian Martin Blinkhorn estimated Italy's scope of state intervention and ownership "greatly surpassed that in Nazi Germany, giving Italy a public sector second only to that of Stalin's Russia". In the late 1930s, Italy enacted manufacturing cartels, tariff barriers, currency restrictions and massive regulation of the economy to attempt to balance payments. Italy's policy of autarky failed to achieve effective economic autonomy. Nazi Germany similarly pursued an economic agenda with the aims of autarky and rearmament and imposed protectionist policies, including forcing the German steel industry to use lower-quality German iron ore rather than superior-quality imported iron.

Fascist Italy and Nazi Germany pursued territorial expansionist and interventionist foreign policy agendas from the 1930s through the 1940s, culminating in World War II. Mussolini supported irredentist Italian claims over neighbouring territories, establishing Italian domination of the Mediterranean Sea, securing Italian access to the Atlantic Ocean, and the creation of Italian spazio vitale ("vital space") in the Mediterranean and Red Sea regions. Hitler supported irredentist German claims overall territories inhabited by ethnic Germans, along with the creation of German Lebensraum ("living space") in Eastern Europe, including territories held by the Soviet Union, that would be colonised by Germans.

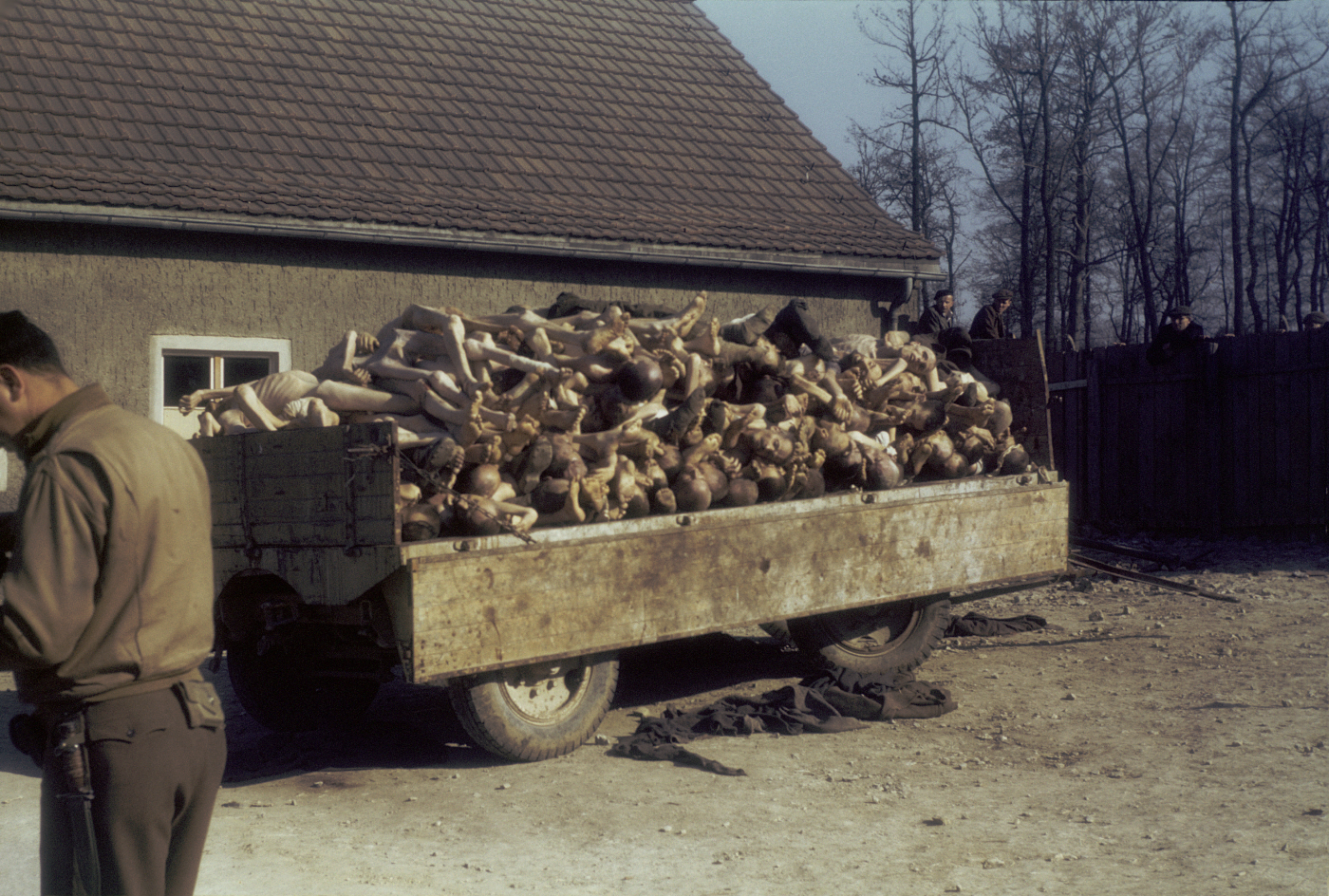
Corpses of victims of the German Buchenwald concentration camp

From 1935 to 1939, Germany and Italy escalated their demands for territorial gains and greater influence in world affairs. Italy invaded Ethiopia in 1935, resulting in condemnation by the League of Nations and widespread diplomatic isolation. In 1936, Germany remilitarised the industrial Rhineland, a region that had been ordered demilitarised by the Treaty of Versailles. In 1938, Germany annexed Austria and the Sudetenland region of Czechoslovakia. The next year, Czechoslovakia was partitioned between Germany and a client state of Slovakia. At the same time, from 1938 to 1939, Italy was demanding territorial and colonial concessions from France and Britain in the Mediterranean. In 1939, Germany prepared for war with Poland, but also attempted to gain territorial concessions from Poland through diplomatic means. Germany demanded that Poland accept the annexation of the Free City of Danzig to Germany and authorise the construction of automobile highways from Germany through the Polish Corridor into Danzig and East Prussia, promising a twenty-five-year non-aggression pact in exchange. The Polish government did not trust Hitler's promises and refused to accept German demands. Following a strategic alliance between Germany and the Soviet Union in August 1939, the two powers invaded Poland in September of that year.

In response, the United Kingdom, France, and their allies declared war against Germany, resulting in the outbreak of World War II. Germany and the Soviet Union partitioned Poland between them in late 1939 followed by the successful German offensive in Scandinavia and continental Western Europe in 1940. On 10 June 1940, Mussolini led Italy into World War II on the side of the Axis. Mussolini was aware that Italy did not have the military capacity to carry out a long war with France or Britain and waited until France was on the verge of imminent collapse before declaring war, on the assumption that the war would be short-lived. Mussolini believed that Italy could gain some territorial concessions from France and then concentrate its forces on a major offensive in Egypt. Plans by Germany to invade the United Kingdom in 1940 failed after Germany lost the aerial warfare campaign in the Battle of Britain. The war became prolonged contrary to Mussolini's plans, resulting in Italy losing battles on multiple fronts and requiring German assistance. In 1941, the Axis campaign spread to the Soviet Union after Hitler launched Operation Barbarossa. Axis forces at the height of their power controlled almost all of continental Europe, including the occupation of large portions of the Soviet Union. By 1942, Fascist Italy occupied and annexed Dalmatia from Yugoslavia, Corsica and Nice from France and controlled other territories. During World War II, the Axis powers in Europe led by Nazi Germany participated in the extermination of millions of Jews and others in the genocide known as the Holocaust.

After 1942, Axis forces began to lose their early upper hand. By 1943, after Italy faced multiple military failures, complete reliance and subordination to Germany and an Allied invasion, Mussolini was removed as head of government and arrested by the order of King Victor Emmanuel III. The king proceeded to dismantle the Fascist state and joined the Allies. Mussolini was rescued from arrest by German forces and led the German client state, the Italian Social Republic from 1943 to 1945. Nazi Germany faced multiple losses and steady Soviet and Western Allied offensives from 1943 to 1945.

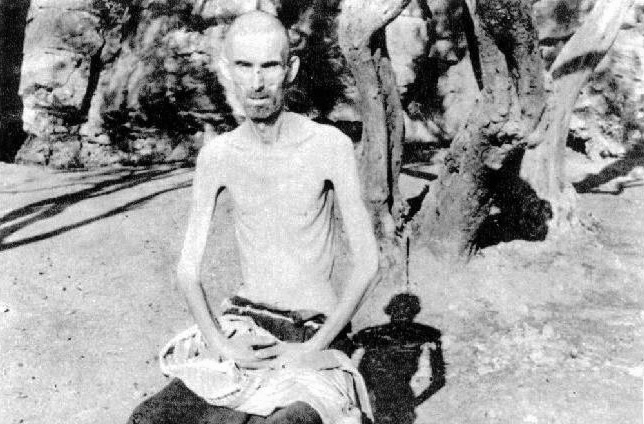
Emaciated male inmate at the Italian Rab concentration camp

On 28 April 1945, Mussolini was captured and executed by Italian communist partisans. On 30 April 1945, Hitler committed suicide during the Battle of Berlin between collapsing German forces and Soviet armed forces. Shortly afterward, Germany surrendered and the Nazi regime was dismantled and key Nazi members were arrested to stand trial for crimes against humanity including the Holocaust.

Yugoslavia, Greece and Ethiopia requested the extradition of 1,200 Italian war criminals, but these people were never subjected to anything like the Nuremberg trials because at the beginning of the Cold War, the British government believed that Pietro Badoglio was a leader who would guarantee that post-war Italy would be an anti-communist country. The repression of memory led to historical revisionism in Italy and in 2003, the Italian media published Silvio Berlusconi's statement that Benito Mussolini only "used to send people on vacation", denying the existence of Italian concentration camps such as the Rab concentration camp.

== See also ==
- History of fascism (1945–present)
- Fascism and ideology
- List of fascist movements
  - List of fascist movements by country
