= History of fascism (1945–present) =

The history of fascism is the ideological, historical, and intellectual influences that culminated in the development of fascism, a far-right, authoritarian, and ultranationalist political ideology and movement that rose to prominence in early-20th-century Europe. The roots have been seen in the political culture of ancient Greece and ancient Rome, and later in Nazism and Italian Fascism.

Fascism emerged throughout the 20th century as a diverse, and evolving synthesis of reactionary and revolutionary ideas, rather than a single, coherent system.

== Fascism, neofascism and postfascism after World War II (1945–2008) ==
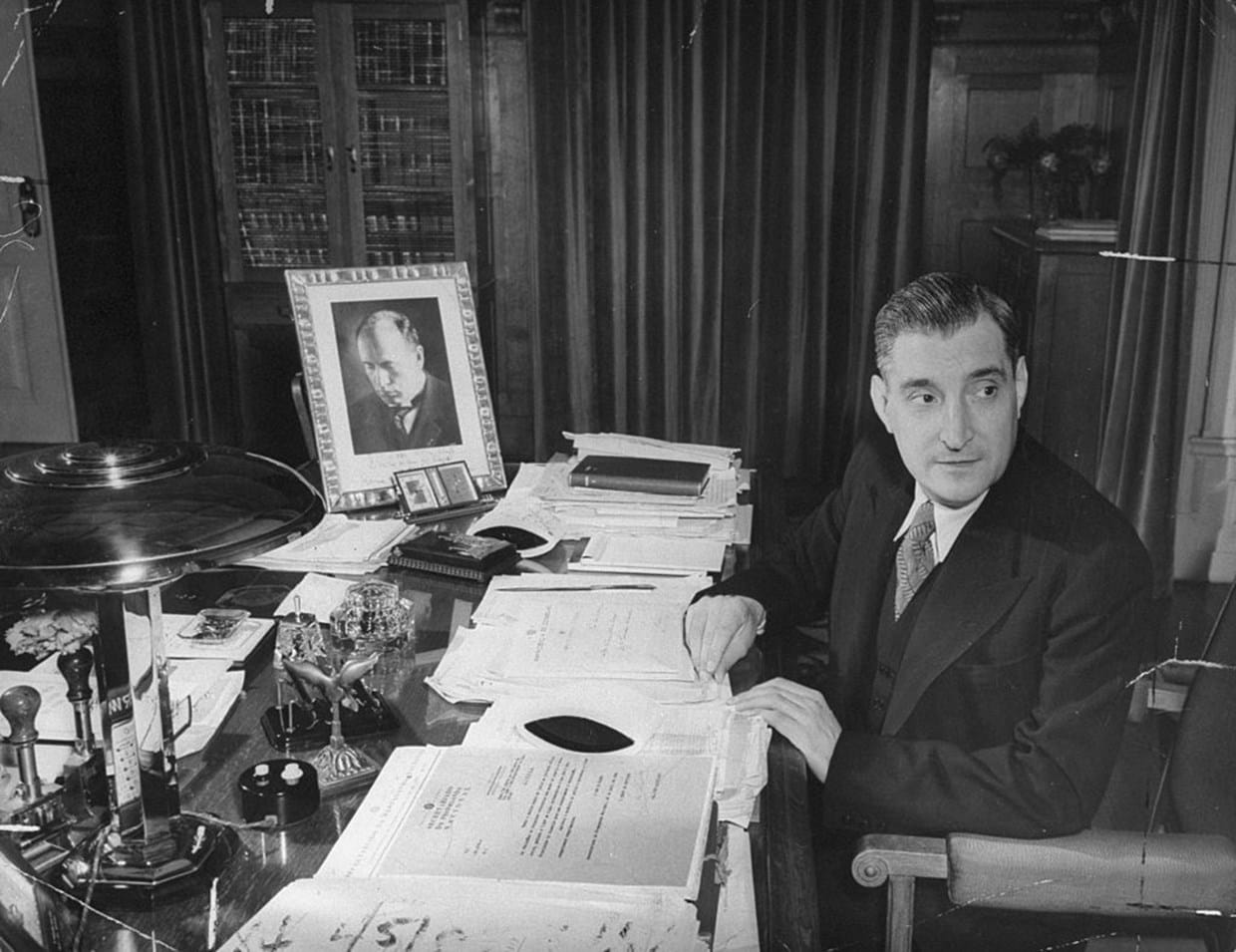
Portuguese Prime Minister António de Oliveira Salazar in 1940 sitting at his desk with an autographed portrait of Mussolini on his desk.

=== Europe ===
In the aftermath of World War II, the victory of the Allies of World War II over the Axis powers led to the collapse of multiple fascist regimes in Europe. The Nuremberg Trials convicted multiple Nazi leaders of crimes against humanity, involving the Holocaust. However, there remained multiple ideologies and governments that were ideologically related to fascism.

Francisco Franco's Falangist one-party state in Spain was officially neutral during World War II, although Franco's rise to power had been directly assisted by the militaries of Fascist Italy and Nazi Germany during the Spanish Civil War. The first years were characterized by a repression against the anti-fascist ideologies, deep censorship and the suppression of democratic institutions (elected Parliament, Spanish Constitution of 1931, Regional Statutes of Autonomy). After World War II and a period of international isolation, Franco's regime normalized relations with the Western powers during the Cold War, until Franco's death in 1975 and the transformation of Spain into a liberal democracy.

Historian Robert Paxton observes that one of the main problems in defining fascism is that it was widely mimicked. Paxton says: "In fascism's heyday, in the 1930s, many regimes that were not functionally fascist borrowed elements of fascist decor in order to lend themselves an aura of force, vitality, and mass mobilization." He goes on to observe that António de Oliveira Salazar "crushed Portuguese fascism after he had copied some of its techniques of popular mobilization". Paxton says: "Where Franco subjected Spain's fascist party to his personal control, Salazar abolished outright in July 1934 the nearest thing Portugal had to an authentic fascist movement, Rolão Preto's blue-shirted National Syndicalists. ... Salazar preferred to control his population through such 'organic' institutions traditionally powerful in Portugal as the Church. Salazar's regime was not only non-fascist, but 'voluntarily non-totalitarian,' preferring to let those of its citizens who kept out of politics 'live by habit.'" However, historians tend to view the Estado Novo as para-fascist in nature, possessing minimal fascist tendencies. Other historians, including Fernando Rosas and Manuel Villaverde Cabral, think that the Estado Novo should be considered fascist.

The term neo-fascism refers to fascist movements that generally originated after World War II. According to Jean-Yves Camus and Nicolas Lebourg, the neo-fascist ideology emerged in 1942, after Nazi Germany invaded the USSR and decided to reorient its propaganda on a Europeanist ground. In Italy, the Italian Social Movement led by Giorgio Almirante was a major neo-fascist movement that transformed itself into a self-described "post-fascist" movement called the National Alliance (AN), which has been an ally of Silvio Berlusconi's Forza Italia for a decade. In 2008, AN joined Forza Italia in Berlusconi's new party The People of Freedom, but in 2012 a group of politicians split from The People of Freedom, refounding the party with the name Brothers of Italy. In Germany, various neo-Nazi movements have been formed and banned in accordance with Germany's constitutional law which forbids Nazism. The National Democratic Party of Germany (NPD) is widely considered a neo-Nazi party, although the party does not publicly identify itself as such.

=== South America ===
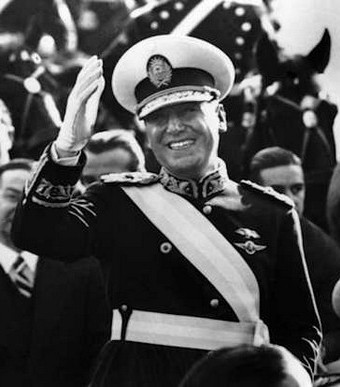
Juan Perón, President of Argentina from 1946 to 1955 and 1973 to 1974, admired Italian Fascism and modelled his economic policies on those pursued by Fascist Italy

In Argentina, Peronism, associated with the regime of Juan Perón from 1946 to 1955 and 1973 to 1974, was strongly influenced by fascism. Between 1939 and 1941, prior to his rise to power, Perón had developed a deep admiration of Italian Fascism and modelled his economic policies on Italian fascist policies. However, not all historians agree with this identification, which some considering it debatable and others believing it is simply used as a pejorative. Historian Raanan Rein argues that Perón was not a fascist and that this characterization was imposed on him because of his defiant stance against US hegemony. Paxton writes that Perónism seemed to have much in common with fascism and so may have looked like a form of it to the Western contemporaries, but writes that it operated differently: lacked "the diabolized internal/external enemy" or Other and was directed against a narrow military oligarchy instead, was not interested in expansionism, increased civilian participation, and had a more proletarian social base.

=== Africa ===
The South African government of Afrikaner nationalist and white supremacist Daniel François Malan was closely associated with pro-fascist and pro-Nazi politics. In 1937, Malan's Purified National Party, the South African Fascists and the Blackshirts agreed to form a coalition for the South African election. Malan had fiercely opposed South Africa's participation on the Allied side in World War II. Malan's government founded apartheid, the system of racial segregation of whites and non-whites in South Africa. The most extreme Afrikaner fascist movement is the neo-Nazi white supremacist Afrikaner Resistance Movement (AWB) that at one point was recorded in 1991 to have 50,000 supporters with rising support. The AWB grew in support in response to efforts to dismantle apartheid in the 1980s and early 1990s and its paramilitary wing the Storm Falcons threatened violence against people it considered "trouble makers".

=== Asia ===
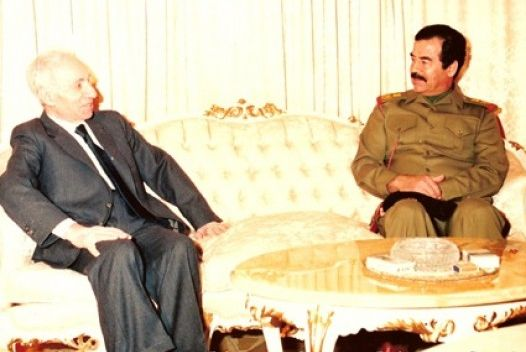
Ba'ath Party founder Michel Aflaq (left) with Iraqi President Saddam Hussein (right) in 1988, as both of Ba'athism's key ideologists Michel Aflaq and Zaki al-Arsuzi were directly inspired by Fascism and Nazism

Another ideology strongly influenced by fascism is Ba'athism. Ba'athism is a revolutionary Arab nationalist ideology that seeks the unification of all claimed Arab lands into a single Arab state. Zaki al-Arsuzi, one of the principal founders of Ba'athism, was strongly influenced by and supportive of Fascism and Nazism. Several close associates of Ba'athism's key ideologist Michel Aflaq have admitted that Aflaq had been directly inspired by certain fascist and Nazi theorists. Ba'athist regimes in power in Iraq and Syria have held strong similarities to fascism, they are radical authoritarian nationalist one-party states. Due to Ba'athism's anti-Western stances it preferred the Soviet Union in the Cold War and admired and adopted certain Soviet organisational structures for their governments, but the Ba'athist regimes have persecuted communists. Like fascist regimes, Ba'athism became heavily militarised in power. Ba'athist movements governed Iraq in 1963 and again from 1968 to 2003 and in Syria from 1963 to 2024. Ba'athist heads of state such as Syrian President Hafez al-Assad and Iraqi President Saddam Hussein created personality cults around themselves portraying themselves as the nationalist saviours of the Arab world.

Ba'athist Iraq under Saddam Hussein pursued ethnic cleansing or the liquidation of minorities, pursued expansionist wars against Iran and Kuwait and gradually replaced pan-Arabism with an Iraqi nationalism that emphasised Iraq's connection to the glories of ancient Mesopotamian empires, including Babylonia. Historian of fascism Stanley Payne has said about Saddam Hussein's regime: "There will probably never again be a reproduction of the Third Reich, but Saddam Hussein has come closer than any other dictator since 1945".

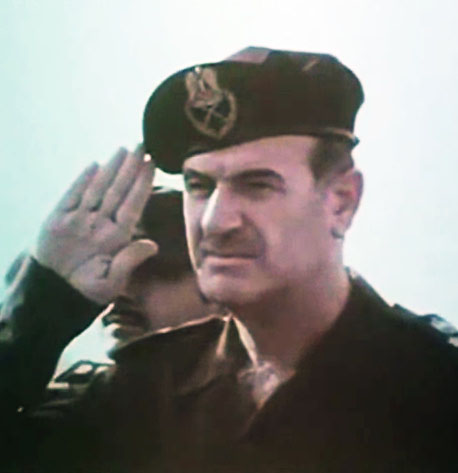
Nazi war criminal Alois Brunner (left), the right-hand man of Adolf Eichmann, served for decades as the advisor of Ba'athist dictator Hafez al-Assad (right) in building Syria's secret police and security apparatus. Brunner is reported to have died in Damascus in 2001 or 2010.

Ba'athist Syria under the Assad dynasty granted asylum, protection and funding for the internationally wanted Nazi war-criminal Alois Brunner for decades. An SS officer under the command of Adolf Eichmann, Brunner directly oversaw the abduction and deportations of hundreds of thousands of Jews to Nazi extermination camps during the Holocaust. For decades, Brunner provided extensive training to the Syrian Mukhabarat on Nazi torture practices and re-organised the Ba'athist secret police on the model of the SS and Gestapo. Extreme antisemitic sentiments have been normalised in Syrian society through the pervasive Ba'athist propaganda system. The Assad regime was also the only regime in the world that granted asylum to Abu Daoud, the mastermind of the 1972 Munich Olympic Massacre. In his notorious book Matzo of Zion, Syrian Minister of Defense Mustafa Tlass accused the Jews of blood libel and harbouring "black hatred against all humankind and religions".

Antisemitic canards and conspiracies have also been promoted as a regular feature in the state TV shows during the reign of Bashar al-Assad. Since the start of the Syrian civil war in 2011, some neo-Nazi and neo-fascist groups have supported the Assad regime, including CasaPound, Golden Dawn, Black Lily, the British National Party, National rebirth of poland, and Forza Nuova. The affinity shown by some neo-Nazis to the leftist-oriented Syrian Ba'ath party is commonly explained as part of the former's far-right worldview rooted in Islamophobia, admiration for totalitarian states and perception that the Ba'athist government is against Jews. British-Syrian activist Leila al-Shamy states this could also be due to doctrinal similarities:

"the ideological roots of Baathism, which definitely incorporates elements of fascism... took inspiration from European fascism, particularly how to build a totalitarian state."

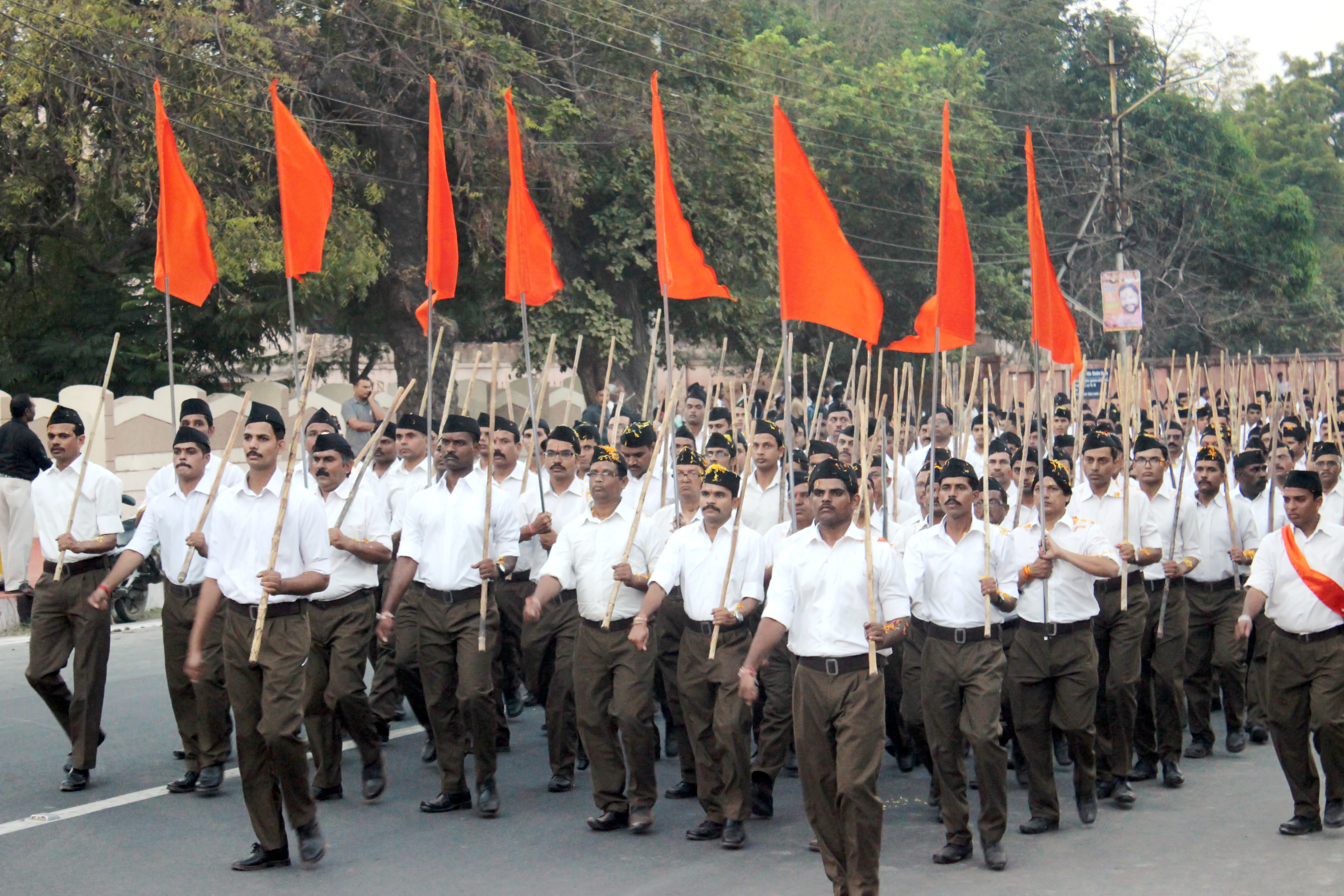
Members of the Rashtriya Swayamsevak Sangh (RSS) marching in Bhopal, 2016.

In the 1990s, Stanley Payne claimed that the Indian Hindutva organisation Rashtriya Swayamsevak Sangh (RSS) holds strong resemblances to fascism, including its use of paramilitaries and its irredentist claims calling for the creation of a Greater India. Dean McHenry in World Fascism: A Historical Encyclopedia describes the ideology of the RSS as "fascism with Sanskrit characters" – a unique Indian variant of fascism. McHenry notes that there is evidence that the RSS held direct contact with Italy's Fascist regime and admired European fascism, a view with some support from A. James Gregor. However, these views have been met with criticism from some scholars of the field that do not subscribe to the view the RSS is fascist, notably among them Christophe Jaffrelot, A. James Gregor and Chetan Bhatt. They argue this on the basis of an apparent absence of charismatic leadership, a desire on the part of the RSS to differentiate itself from European fascism, and cultural differences between the RSS and European fascists, alongside factionalism within the Sangh Parivar.

== Contemporary fascism (2008–present) ==
Since the Great Recession of 2008, fascism has seen an international surge in popularity, alongside closely associated phenomena like xenophobia, antisemitism, authoritarianism and euroskepticism.

=== Greece ===
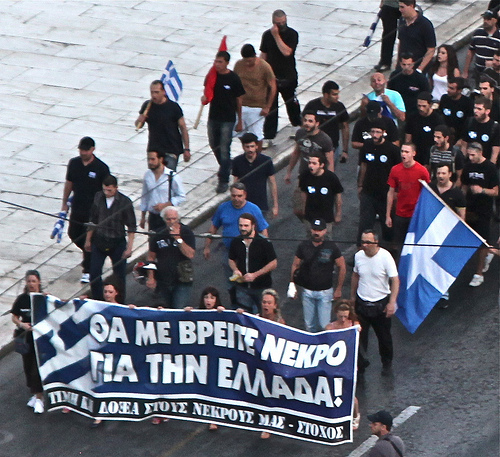
Golden Dawn demonstration in Greece in 2012

After the onset of the Great Recession and economic crisis in Greece, a movement known as the Golden Dawn, widely considered a neo-Nazi party, soared in support out of obscurity and won seats in Greece's parliament, espousing a staunch hostility towards minorities, illegal immigrants and refugees. In 2013, after the murder of an anti-fascist musician by a person with links to Golden Dawn, the Greek government ordered the arrest of Golden Dawn's leader Nikolaos Michaloliakos and other members on charges related to being associated with a criminal organisation. On 7 October 2020, Athens Appeals Court announced verdicts for 68 defendants, including the party's political leadership. Nikolaos Michaloliakos and six other prominent members and former members of parliament (MPs) were found guilty of running a criminal organisation. Guilty verdicts were delivered on charges of murder, attempted murder, and violent attacks on immigrants and left-wing political opponents.

=== Post-Soviet Russia ===
Marlene Laruelle, a French political scientist, contends in Is Russia Fascist? that the accusation of "fascist" has evolved into a strategic narrative of the existing world order. Geopolitical rivals might construct their own view of the world and assert the moral high ground by branding ideological rivals as fascists, regardless of their real ideals or deeds. Laruelle discusses the basis, significance, and veracity of accusations of fascism in and around Russia through an analysis of the domestic situation in Russia and the Kremlin's foreign policy justifications; she concludes that Russian efforts to brand its opponents as fascist is ultimately an attempt to determine the future of Russia in Europe as an antifascist force, influenced by its role in fighting fascism in World War II.

According to Alexander J. Motyl, an American historian and political scientist, Russian fascism has the following characteristics:

- An undemocratic political system, different from both traditional authoritarianism and totalitarianism;
- Statism and hypernationalism;
- A hypermasculine cult of the supreme leader (emphasis on his courage, militancy and physical prowess);
- General popular support for the regime and its leader.

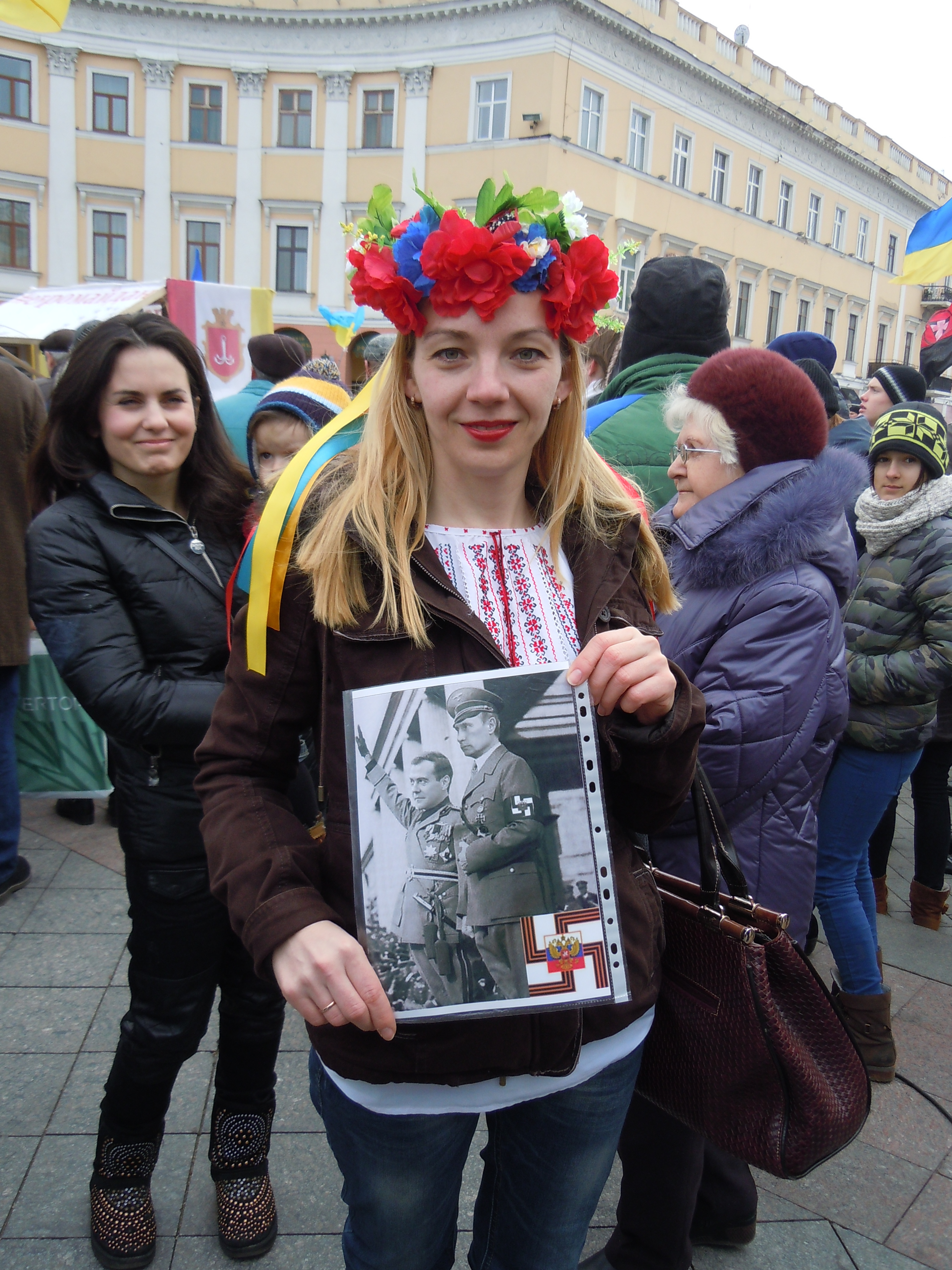
Protester against the Russian government, holding an image portraying Dmitry Medvedev and Vladimir Putin as Nazis with a swastika made of colours of the Ribbon of Saint George and a Russian coat of arms in the centre (Odesa, 2014)

Yale historian Timothy Snyder has stated, "Putin's regime is ... the world center of fascism" and has written an article entitled "We Should Say It: Russia Is Fascist". Oxford historian Roger Griffin compared Putin's Russia to the World War II-era Empire of Japan, saying that like Putin's Russia, it "emulated fascism in many ways, but was not fascist". Historian Stanley G. Payne says Putin's Russia "is not equivalent to the fascist regimes of World War II, but it forms the nearest analogue to fascism found in a major country since that time" and argues that Putin's political system is "more a revival of the creed of Tsar Nicholas I in the 19th century that emphasised 'Orthodoxy, autocracy, and nationality' than one resembling the revolutionary, modernising regimes of Hitler and Mussolini". According to Griffin, fascism is "a revolutionary form of nationalism" seeking to destroy the old system and remake society, and that Putin is a reactionary politician who is not trying to create a new order "but to recreate a modified version of the Soviet Union". German political scientist Andreas Umland said genuine fascists in Russia, like deceased politician Vladimir Zhirinovsky and activist and self-styled philosopher Aleksandr Dugin, "describe in their writings a completely new Russia" controlling parts of the world that were never under tsarist or Soviet domination. According to Marlene Laurelle writing in The Washington Quarterly, "applying the "fascism" label ... to the entirety of the Russian state or society short-circuits our ability to construct a more complex and differentiated picture."

Radio Free Europe/Radio Liberty, collecting the opinions of experts on fascism, said that while Russia is repressive and authoritarian, it cannot be classified as a fascist state for various reasons, including Russia's government being more reactionary than revolutionary. In 2023, Oleg Orlov, the chairman of the Board of Human Rights Center "Memorial", claimed that Russia under Vladimir Putin had descended into fascism and that the army is committing "mass murder" in the Russo-Ukrainian war. On 7 March 2024, in his 2024 State of the Union Address, American President Joe Biden compared Russia under Vladimir Putin to Adolf Hitler's conquests of Europe.

=== United States ===
While initially composed of distinctive movements, in the 21st century, many Neo-Nazi groups in the U.S. have moved towards more decentralized organization and online social networks with a terroristic focus. After the election of Donald Trump, fascist groups began coalescing around his right-wing populism to take advantage of it. In 2017, the Unite the Right rally saw marchers come together from a variety of far-right groups and movements, including members of the alt-right, neo-Confederates, neo-fascists, white nationalists, neo-Nazis, Klansmen, and far-right militias. Around this period, a number of prominent fascist groups were also founded, including the Proud Boys and Patriot Front.

Other neo-Nazi groups that were founded in the United States in the 20th century are still active, including the National Alliance, the American Nazi Party, and the Institute for Historical Review, which publishes negationist literature of an antisemitic nature.

== See also ==
- History of fascism (pre-1922)
- History of fascism (1922–1945)
- Fascism and ideology
- List of fascist movements
  - List of fascist movements by country
