= Heroic capitalism =

Concept proposed by Benito Mussolini

Heroic capitalism or dynamic capitalism was a concept proposed by Benito Mussolini in a speech given in November 1933 to the National Council of Corporations of the Kingdom of Italy. The speech was given in the context of the ongoing Great Depression, and Mussolini attempted to explain the economic crisis in the world at the time by arguing that capitalism had gradually degenerated from its origins: first there had been dynamic or heroic capitalism (1830–1870), followed by static capitalism (1870–1914), in turn followed by the final form of decadent capitalism, known also as supercapitalism, which began in 1914.

Although Mussolini did not advocate a return to heroic capitalism, he praised it as a golden age of private initiative and free competition, reflecting Italian Fascism's admiration for "capitalist production, captains of industries, modern entrepreneurs." In principle, the Italian bourgeoisie could count on Mussolini's support as long as it remained heroic. However, Mussolini believed that the degeneration of capitalism away from its heroic stage was an inevitable result of economic individualism, and therefore argued that the supervision of the Fascist state was essential to enable private enterprise to maintain its heroic character. Italian Fascism would continue to support private property and private enterprise as long as "it does not confine itself to enjoying wealth, but develops it, increases it, multiplies it".

This concept was inspired by Werner Sombart's early capitalism.
