= Supercapitalism =

Concept introduced by Benito Mussolini in a speech in 1933

Supercapitalism was a concept introduced by Benito Mussolini in a speech given in November 1933 to the National Council of Corporations of the Kingdom of Italy. Mussolini gave this speech in the context of the ongoing Great Depression, and he attempted to explain the economic crisis in the world at the time by arguing that capitalism had gradually degenerated from its original form: first there had been dynamic or heroic capitalism (1830–1870), followed by static capitalism (1870–1914), in turn followed by the final form of decadent capitalism, known also as supercapitalism, which began in 1914. Mussolini claimed that at the stage of supercapitalism "a capitalist enterprise, when difficulties arise, throws itself like a dead weight into the state's arms. It is then that state intervention begins and becomes more necessary. It is then that those who once ignored the state now seek it out anxiously".

Mussolini argued that although Italian Fascism did not support a return to dynamic or heroic capitalism, he appreciated heroic capitalism for its industrial advances and technological achievements, and Italian Fascism admired "capitalist production, captains of industries, modern entrepreneurs". However, Mussolini said that he did not support or appreciate supercapitalism, claiming that it was incompatible with Italy's agricultural sector. Furthermore, he strongly criticized supercapitalism for its emphasis on standardization and mass consumption, saying:

At this stage, supercapitalism finds its inspiration and its justification in a utopia: the utopia of unlimited consumption. Supercapitalism's ideal is the standardization of the human race from the cradle to the grave. Supercapitalism wants all babies to be born exactly the same length so that the cradles can be standardized and all children persuaded to like the same toys. It wants all men to don the very same uniform, to read the same book, to have the same tastes in films, and to desire the same so-called labor-saving devices. This is not the result of caprice. It inheres in the logic of events, for only thus can supercapitalism make its plans.

In place of supercapitalism, Mussolini advocated what he called a corporative economy, saying that this economy "respects the principle of private property. Private property completes the human personality. It is a right. But it is also a duty." He claimed that the best elements of heroic capitalism could be restored under the corporative state, arguing that "only when private initiative is unintelligent, non-existent, or inefficient may the State intervene."

== See also ==
- Corporatocracy
- Crony capitalism
- Socialism for the rich and capitalism for the poor
- Corporate welfare
- Managerial state
- Supercapitalism: The Transformation of Business, Democracy, and Everyday Life
- Supercapitalist
