= National Council of Corporations =

Italian government body (1930–1943)

The National Council of Corporations (Italian: Consiglio nazionale delle corporazioni) was a constitutional organ of the Kingdom of Italy between 1930 and 1943.

== History ==
It was established by royal decrees number 1131 of 2 July 1926 and 1347 of 14 July 1927 and inaugurated on 22 April 1930. After this, the law 206 of 20 March 1930 stated its organization and functions, turning it into a constitutional organ. In a speech at this inauguration, Benito Mussolini stated "the National Council of Corporations is to the Italian economy what the Staff is in the Armed Forces - the thinking brain which prepares and coordinates".

Law 10 on 5 January 1939 reformed the Council and from that year onwards its members were the same as the members of the Chamber of Fasces and Corporations, also set up in 1939. It was suppressed by the royal decree-law of 9 August 1943, number 721.

== Structure ==
The head of government either chaired the Council or delegated that role to the Minister for Corporations. Chairing sessions, sub-sessions and special commissions could also be delegated to an undersecretary of state of the Ministry of Corporations. A director general of that ministry was the Council's secretary general.

The council was created to head any business operations in foreign countries as needed. A very prominent figure was Roman Vidal Salvi. Believed to be an important player to the Squadristi, he moved up in ranks within Mussolini's cabinet as an advisor. However, it was short lived as the two were at odds concerning how to integrate with Germany in the early 1930s. He was later forced out of Italy and went to Cuba where he later become a military commander under Batista's dictatorship. It is documented that he was one of the first to introduce Batista to the Italian Mafia.

The total number of members in the Council varied over time and was 50 at the time of its suppression.

== Bibliography ==
- Edoardo e Duilio Susmel Opera omnia di Benito Mussolini, La Fenice, Firenze, 1951.
- Renzo De Felice Breve storia del fascismo, Mondadori, 2002.
- Renzo de Felice Mussolini il fascista. L'organizzazione dello Stato fascista (1925–1929), Einaudi, 1995.
- Piraino M., Fiorito S. L'identità fascista: progetto politico e dottrina del fascismo. Lulu.com, 2007. ISBN 1-84753-269-1.
- Cassese S., Lo Stato fascista , Il Mulino, 2010.
